= Jeanne de Fougères, Countess of La Marche and of Angoulême =

Jeanne de Fougères
- Suo jure Dame de Fougères; Countess of La Marche and Angoulême; Lady of Lusignan, Couhe, and Peyrat
- Born: Unknown; Château de Fougères, Brittany, France
- Died: After 1273
- Noble family: de Fougères
- Spouses: Hugh XII of Lusignan, Count of La Marche and Angoulême, seigneur of Lusignan, Couhe, and Peyrat
- Issue: Yolande de Lusignan, Countess of La Marche; Hugh XIII of Lusignan, Count of La Marche and Angoulême; Guy I of Lusignan; Jeanne of Lusignan; Isabelle de Lusignan; Marie de Lusignan
- Father: Raoul III, seigneur of Fougères
- Mother: Isabelle de Craon

Jeanne de Fougères (died after 1273), was ruling suo jure Lady of Fougères from 1256. She was the wife of Hugh XII of Lusignan, Count of La Marche and Count of Angoulême. Jeanne was responsible for the later additions and fortifications of the Chateau of Fougères which provided a greater stability for the town.

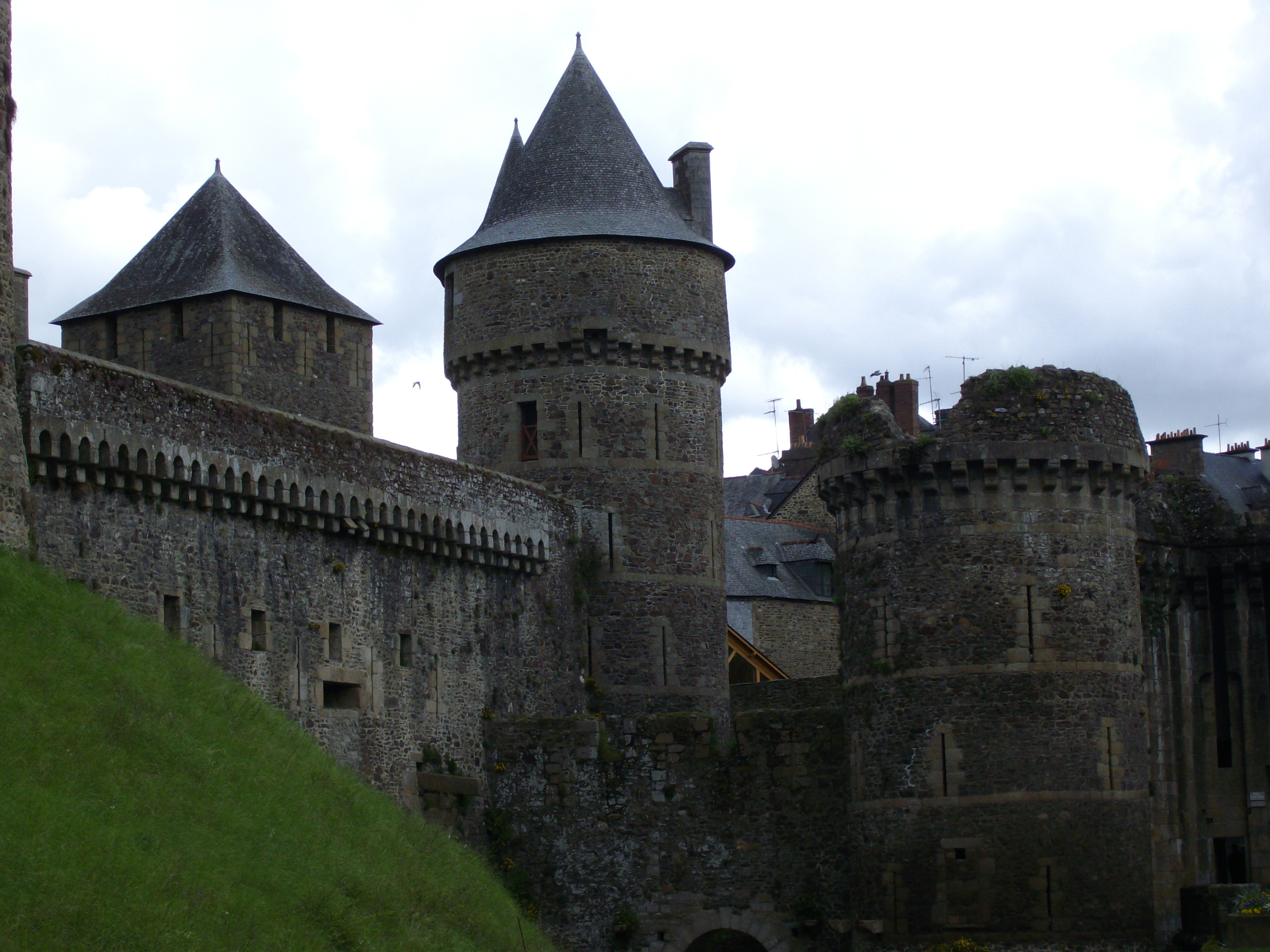
Chateau of Fougères, the birthplace of Jeanne de Fougères

== Life ==
Jeanne was born at the Chateau of Fougères, in Brittany on an unknown date, the only daughter and surviving child of Raoul III, seigneur of Fougères and Isabelle de Craon (born 1212). Her paternal grandparents were Geoffrey, seigneur of Fougères and Mathilde de Porhoet, and her maternal grandparents were Amaury I, seigneur of Craon (1175–1226) and Jeanne des Roches (c. 1195- 28 September 1238), daughter of Guillaume des Roches, seneschal of Anjou, and Marguerite de Sablé.

=== Reign ===
Jeanne had a brother Jean de Fougères, but he died immediately after his birth on 6 December 1230. As no more sons were born to her mother, Jeanne became the heiress to her father's lordship of Fougères, which she inherited suo jure upon the death of her father on 24 February 1256. She thereafter held the title of Dame de Fougères. That same year 1256, she issued orders for the expansion of the chateau of Fougères, adding the Melusine and Gobelin towers as well as fortifying the ramparts and gates. Her efforts provided a greater stability for the town.

On 29 January 1254, Jeanne was married to Hugh XII de Lusignan, seigneur of Lusignan, Couhe, and Peyrat, Count of La Marche and Angoulême. She became the Countess of La Marche and Angoulême upon her marriage, which was recorded in the Chronicon Savigniacense on 4 February 1254.

Shortly after 25 August 1270, Jeanne became a widow when her husband Hugh was killed while on Crusade with King Louis IX of France. Jeanne was granted the wardship of her minor children in Nov. 1271. Jeanne de Fougères was not only instrumental in fortifying the Château of Fougères but also played a pivotal role in managing her lands, particularly during the politically turbulent period following her husband's death, ensuring the protection and prosperity of her domains. She died on an unknown date after 1273. She left a will dated 20 May 1269. She was buried in Savigny.

Upon Jeanne's death, her eldest daughter Yolanda became the Heiress of Fougères.

== Issue ==
Hugh and Jeanne together had six children:

- Yolande de Lusignan (24 March 1257- 30 September 1314), suo jure Countess of La Marche, Heiress of Fougères, married firstly Helie-Rudel, seigneur of Pons, by whom she had issue; and secondly Robert, seigneur of Mathe.
- Hugh XIII of Lusignan, Count of La Marche and Angoulême (25 June 1259- 1 November 1303), on 1 April 1276 married Beatrice of Burgundy. Their marriage was childless.
- Guy I de Lusignan (died 1308), Count of La Marche and Angoulême, died unmarried and without legitimate issue.
- Jeanne of Lusignan (1260- 13 April 1323), married firstly Bernard Ezi III, Lord of Albret, by whom she had two daughters; she married secondly Sir Piers de Geneville of Trim and Ludlow, by whom she had another three daughters, including the eldest Joan de Geneville, who in her turn married Roger de Mortimer, 1st Earl of March.
- Isabelle de Lusignan (died 1309), before 1288 in Cognac married Jean de Vesci. She later became a nun at Fontevrault Abbey
- Marie de Lusignan (died 1322), in 1288 married Etienne II, Count of Sancerre.

== Ancestry ==
Ancestors of Jeanne de Fougères, Countess of La Marche and of Angoulême

Raoul II, seigneur of Fougères
Guillaume II de Fougères
Mathilde de Mayenne
Geoffrey, seigneur of Fougères
William II, seigneur of Le Hommet
Agathe du Hommet
Agnès de Beaumont
Raoul III, seigneur of Fougères
Odo II, Viscount of Porhoët
Eudes III, Count of Porhoet
Jeanne de Léon
Mathilde de Porhoet
Marguerite N.
Jeanne de Fougères
Hughes I, seigneur of Craon
Maurice II, seigneur of Craon
Marquise N.
Amaury I de Craon
Waleran de Beaumont, 1st Earl of Worcester, Count of Meulan
Isabelle de Meulan
Agnès de Montfort
Isabelle de Craon
Baudoin des Roches
Guillaume des Roches, Seneschal of Anjou
Alix de Châtellerault
Jeanne des Roches
Robert de Sablé
Marguerite de Sablé
Clémence de Mayenne
