= Joan of Lusignan =

French noblewoman (1260–1323)

- suo jure Lady of Couche and Peyrat; Dame d'Albret; Lady de Geneville
- Born: 1260; Angoulême, France
- Died: 13 April 1323 (aged 63)
- Buried: Abbaye de Valence, France
- Noble family: Lusignan
- Spouses: Bernard Ezi III, Lord of Albret; Sir Piers de Geneville of Trim and Ludlow Castle
- Issue: Mathe, Dame d'Albret; Isabelle, Dame d'Albret; Joan de Geneville; Maud de Geneville; Beatrice de Geneville
- Father: Hugh XII of Lusignan, Count of La Marche and Angoulême
- Mother: Jeanne de Fougères

Joan of Lusignan (1260 – 13 April 1323) was a French noblewoman. She succeeded her uncle, Guy de la Marche, Knight, sometime in the period, 1310/13, as Lady of Couche and Peyrat, but not as Countess of La Marche since after her sister, Yolande's death, it was annexed by Philip IV of France and given as an appanage to Philip's son Charles the Fair. Previously, in 1308, following the death of her brother Guy (or Guiard), Jeanne and her sister Isabelle, as co-heiresses, had sold the county of Angoulême to the King.

She was married twice. Her first husband was Bernard Ezi III, Lord of Albret, by whom she had two daughters. By her second husband Sir Piers de Geneville, she had another three daughters; the eldest of whom was Joan de Geneville, 2nd Baroness Geneville, wife of Roger Mortimer, 1st Earl of March, the de facto ruler of England from 1327 to 1330.

She is sometimes referred to as Jeanne of Lusignan.

== Family ==
Joan was a younger daughter of Hugh XII of Lusignan, Count of La Marche and Angoulême, lord of Lusignan and Fougères, and Jeanne de Fougères.

Her grandfather, Hugh XI of Lusignan, was the half-brother of King Henry III of England.

== Marriages ==
Joan married firstly Bernard Ezi III, Lord of Albret, by whom she had two daughters:

- Mathe, Dame d'Albret (died 1283)
- Isabelle, Dame d'Albret (died 1 December 1294), married Bernard VI, Count of Armagnac, as his first wife. Their marriage was childless.

After the death of her first husband on 24 December 1280, Joan married secondly before 11 Oct. 1283 (date of charter), Sir Piers de Geneville, of Trim and Ludlow Castle (1256 – before June 1292), by whom she had another three daughters:

- Joan de Geneville (2 February 1286 – 19 October 1356), in 1301 married Roger de Mortimer, 1st Earl of March (d. 29 November 1330), by whom she had twelve children.
- Maud de Geneville, a nun at Aconbury Priory
- Beatrice de Geneville, a nun at Aconbury Priory

== Death and legacy ==
Joan died 13 April 1323 at the age of 63, and was buried at the Abbaye de Valence.

== Ancestry ==
Ancestors of Joan of Lusignan

Hugh X of Lusignan, Count of La Marche, Count of Angoulême
Hugh XI of Lusignan, Count of La Marche, Count of Angoulême
Isabella of Angoulême, Queen of England
Hugh XII of Lusignan, Count of La Marche, Count of Angoulême
Peter I, Duke of Brittany
Yolande de Dreux
Alix of Thouars, Duchess of Brittany
Joan of Lusignan
Geoffrey, Seigneur of Fougères
Raoul III, seigneur of Fougères
Mathilde de Porhoet
Jeanne de Fougères
Amaury I de Craon
Isabelle de Craon
Jeanne des Roches
