= Joan de Geneville, 2nd Baroness Geneville =

English noblewoman (1286–1356)

Joan de Geneville
- suo jure Baroness Geneville; Countess of March; Baroness Mortimer
- Born: 2 February 1286; Ludlow Castle, Shropshire, England
- Died: 19 October 1356 (aged 70); King's Stanley, Gloucestershire, England
- Noble family: Geneville (by birth); Mortimer (by marriage)
- Spouse: Roger Mortimer, 1st Earl of March (m. 1301; died 1330)
- Issue: Sir Edmund Mortimer; Margaret Mortimer; Roger Mortimer; Maud Mortimer; Geoffrey Mortimer; John Mortimer; Joan Mortimer; Isabella Mortimer; Katherine Mortimer, Countess of Warwick; Agnes Mortimer, Countess of Pembroke; Beatrice Mortimer; Blanche Mortimer
- Father: Sir Piers de Geneville of Trim Castle and Ludlow
- Mother: Jeanne of Lusignan

Joan de Geneville, 2nd Baroness Geneville, Countess of March, Baroness Mortimer (2 February 1286 – 19 October 1356), also known as Jeanne de Joinville, was an English noblewoman, the daughter of Sir Piers de Geneville and Joan of Lusignan. She inherited the estates of her grandparents, Geoffrey de Geneville, 1st Baron Geneville, and Maud de Lacy, Baroness Geneville. She was one of the wealthiest heiresses in the Welsh Marches and County Meath, Ireland. She was the wife of Roger Mortimer, 1st Earl of March, the de facto ruler of England from 1327 to 1330. She succeeded as suo jure 2nd Baroness Geneville on 21 October 1314 upon the death of her grandfather, Geoffrey de Geneville.

As a result of her husband's insurrection against King Edward II of England, she was imprisoned in Skipton Castle for two years. Following the execution of her husband in 1330 for usurping power in England, Joan was once more taken into custody. In 1336, her lands were restored to her after she received a full pardon for her late husband's crimes from Edward II's son and successor, Edward III of England.

== Family and inheritance ==
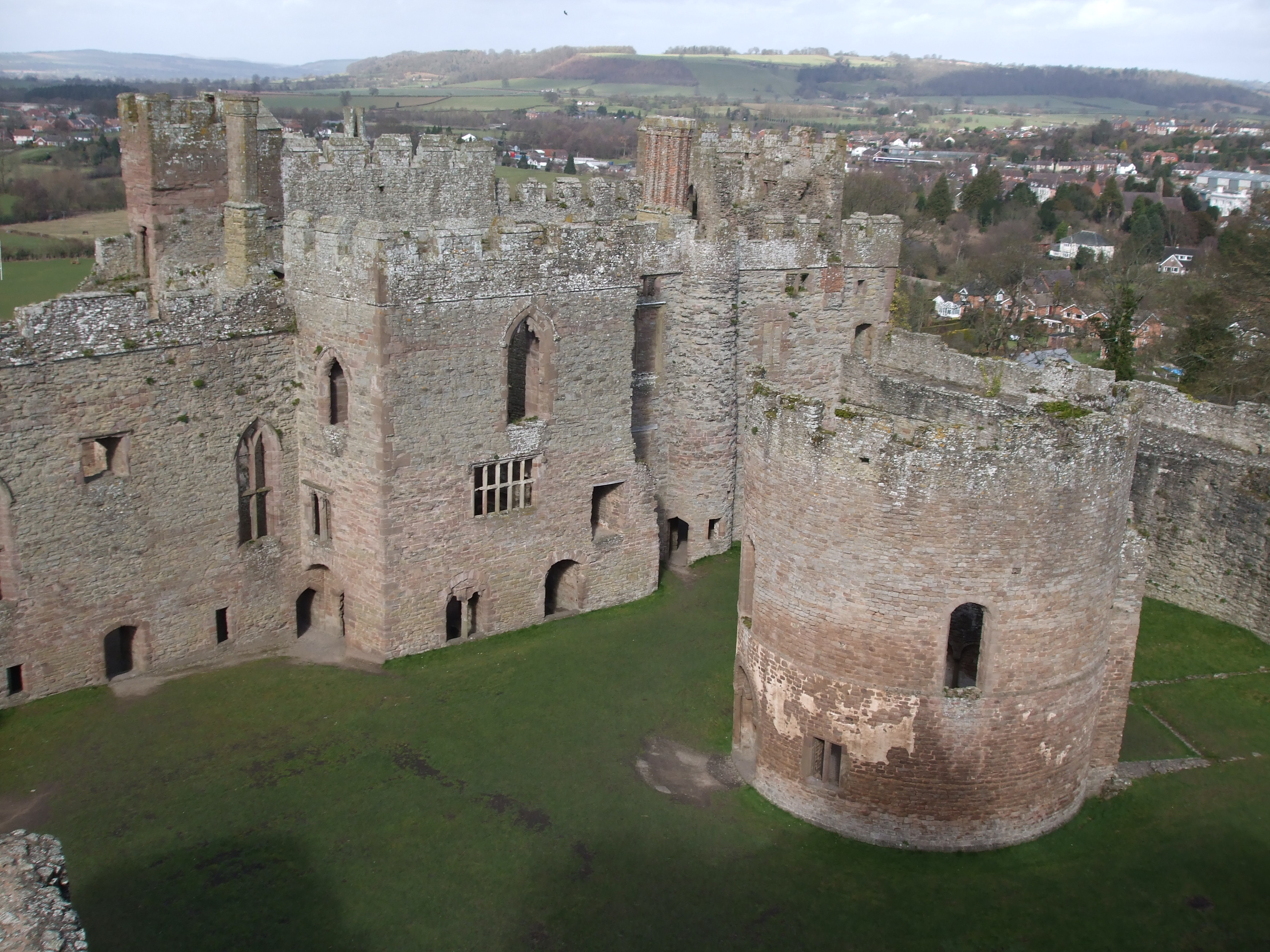
Ludlow Castle in Shropshire, the birthplace of Joan de Geneville

Joan was born on 2 February 1286 at Ludlow Castle in Shropshire. She was the eldest child of Sir Piers de Geneville, of Trim Castle and Ludlow, whose father Sir Geoffrey de Geneville, 1st Baron Geneville, was Justiciar of Ireland and whose mother was the heiress Maud de Lacy, Baroness Geneville.

Her mother Jeanne of Lusignan was part of one of the most illustrious French families, daughter of Hugh XII of Lusignan, Count of La Marche and of Angoulême and his wife and Jeanne de Fougères, and sister of Yolanda of Lusignan, the suo jure Countess of La Marche. Her great-grandfather, Hugh XI of Lusignan, was the half-brother of King Henry III of England.

Joan had two younger sisters, Matilda and Beatrice, who both became nuns at Aconbury Priory in Herefordshire, so that the inheritance from their grandfather Geoffrey de Geneville was not split up. Joan also had two half-sisters from her mother's first marriage to Bernard Ezi III, Lord of Albret: Mathe, Dame d'Albret (died 1283), and Isabelle, Dame d'Albret (died 1 December 1294), wife of Bernard VI, Count of Armagnac.

When her father died in Ireland shortly before June 1292, Joan became one of the wealthiest and most eligible heiresses in the Welsh Marches, with estates that included the town and castle of Ludlow, the lordship of Ewyas Lacy, the manors of Wolferlow, Stanton Lacy, and Mansell Lacy in Shropshire and Herefordshire as well as a sizeable portion of County Meath in Ireland. She was due to inherit these upon the death of her grandfather, but in 1308, Baron Geneville conveyed most of the Irish estates which had belonged to his late wife Maud de Lacy to Joan and her husband Roger Mortimer. They both went to Ireland, where they took seisin of Meath on 28 October of that same year. The baron died on 21 October 1314 at the House of the Friars Preachers at Trim, and Joan subsequently succeeded him, becoming the suo jure 2nd Baroness Geneville.

== Marriage ==
Joan married Roger Mortimer, eldest son of Edmund Mortimer, 2nd Baron Wigmore, and Margaret de Fiennes on 20 September 1301 at the manor of Pembridge. Marriage to Joan was highly beneficial to Mortimer, as it brought him much influence and prestige in addition to the rich estates he gained through their matrimonial alliance, including Ludlow Castle. Ludlow became "the capital of the Mortimer empire."

Three years later in 1304 he succeeded as Baron Mortimer, making Joan Baroness Mortimer. He was knighted on Whitsunday 22 May 1306 by King Edward I. The knighting ceremony took place in Westminster Abbey and was known as the Feast of the Swans as all those present made their personal vows upon two swans. Two hundred and fifty-nine other young men received knighthoods along with Mortimer including the Prince of Wales who would shortly afterwards succeed his father as Edward II. Following the ceremony was a magnificent banquet held at the Great Hall of Westminster.

Upon taking seizen of her Irish lands in 1308, Joan and Mortimer travelled back and forth between their estates in Ireland and those in the Welsh Marches. Given that Joan opted to accompany her husband to Ireland rather than remain at home, and that she produced 12 surviving children over a period of just 17 years led Roger Mortimer's biographer Ian Mortimer to suggest they enjoyed a closer and more affectionate relationship than was typical of noble couples in the 14th century. He described their union as having been " a mutually beneficial secure medieval partnership".

=== Issue ===
Together Joan and Mortimer had twelve surviving children:

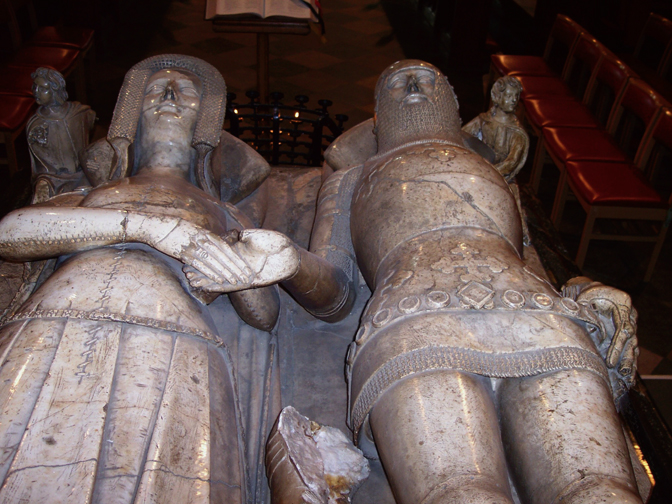
Effigies of Joan's daughter, Katherine Mortimer and her husband Thomas de Beauchamp, 11th Earl of Warwick. St. Mary's Church, Warwick

- Sir Edmund Mortimer (1302/3 – 16 December 1331), married Elizabeth de Badlesmere, daughter of Bartholomew de Badlesmere, 1st Baron Badlesmere, and Margaret de Clare, by whom he had two sons, Roger Mortimer, 2nd Earl of March, and John, who died young.
- Margaret Mortimer (2 May 1304 – 5 May 1337), married Thomas de Berkeley, 3rd Baron Berkeley, by whom she had issue.
- Roger Mortimer (c. 1305 – before August 1328), married Joan Butler.
- Maud Mortimer (c. 1307 – after August 1345), married John Charlton, 2nd Baron Charlton, Lord of Powys, by whom she had issue.
- Geoffrey Mortimer, Lord of Towyth (c. 1308/9 – 1372/5 May 1376), married Jeanne de Lezay, by whom he had issue.
- John Mortimer (c. 1310 – after 1328), killed in a tournament at Shrewsbury.
- Joan Mortimer (c. 1311/2 – 1337/51), married James Audley, 2nd Baron Audley, by whom she had issue.
- Isabella Mortimer (c. 1313 – after 1327)
- Katherine Mortimer (c. 1314 – 4 August 1369), married Thomas de Beauchamp, 11th Earl of Warwick, by whom she had fifteen children, including Thomas de Beauchamp, 12th Earl of Warwick, and William de Beauchamp, 1st Baron Bergavenny, who married Lady Joan FitzAlan.
- Agnes Mortimer (c. 1317 – 25 July 1368), married Laurence Hastings, 1st Earl of Pembroke, by whom she had issue.
- Beatrice Mortimer (c. 1319 – 16 October 1383), married firstly Edward of Norfolk, and secondly, Thomas de Brewes, 1st Baron Brewes. She had issue by her second husband, including the ancestor of the Barons de Saye.
- Blanche Mortimer (c. 1321 – 1347), married Peter de Grandison, 2nd Baron Grandison, by whom she had issue.

== Mortimer's affair with Queen Isabella ==
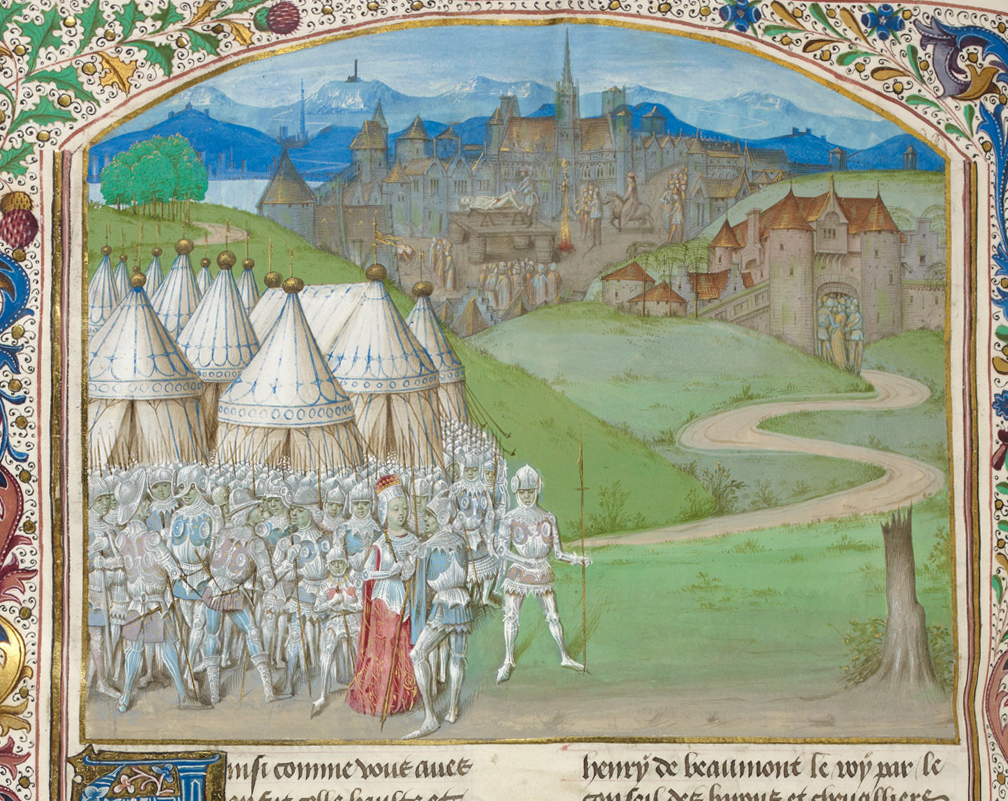
Joan's husband Roger Mortimer, 1st Earl of March, is allegedly depicted in the foreground with Queen Isabella in this 14th-century manuscript illustration

Mortimer was appointed Lord Lieutenant of Ireland on 23 November 1316 and left for Ireland with a large force in February 1317. While there, he fought against the Scots Army led by Edward Bruce, the younger brother of Robert the Bruce (who hoped to make Edward king of Ireland), and Bruce's Norman-Irish allies, the de Lacy's. Joan accompanied her husband to Ireland. They returned to England in 1318 after Mortimer had driven the Scots north to Carrickfergus, and dispersed the de Lacys, who were Joan's relatives. For the next few years, Mortimer occupied himself with baronial disputes on the Welsh border; nevertheless, on account of the increasing influence of Hugh Despenser, the Elder, and Hugh Despenser the Younger over King Edward II, Mortimer became strongly disaffected with his monarch, especially after the younger Despenser had been granted lands which rightfully belonged to Mortimer.

In October 1321 King Edward and his troops besieged Leeds Castle, after the governor's wife, Margaret de Clare, Baroness Badlesmere, refused Queen Isabella admittance and subsequently ordered her archers to fire upon Isabella and her escort after the latter attempted to gain entry to the castle. Elizabeth, the third Badlesmere daughter, was married to Joan and Mortimer's eldest son, Edmund Mortimer. King Edward exploited his new popularity in the wake of his military victory at Leeds Castle to recall to England the Despensers, whom the Lords Ordainers, led by Thomas, 2nd Earl of Lancaster, had forced him to banish in August 1321.

The Marcher lords, already in a state of insurrection for some time prior to the Despensers' banishment, (Note: Commencing in February 1321, Mortimer and the other Marcher Lords had conducted devastating attacks against Despenser lands in Wales; Mortimer and his men had also made an attempt to march on London. These events, among others, had made it imperative for the Ordainers to compel the King to banish the favourites.) immediately rose up against the King in full force, with Mortimer leading the confederation alongside Ordainer Humphrey de Bohun, 4th Earl of Hereford. The King quelled the rebellion, which is also known as the Despenser War. Mortimer and his uncle Roger Mortimer de Chirk both surrendered to him at Shrewsbury on 22 January 1322. Mortimer and his uncle were dispatched as prisoners to the Tower of London, where they were kept in damp, unhealthy quarters. This was likely a factor in Roger Mortimer de Chirk's death in 1326. Joan's husband had fared better and by drugging the constable and the Tower guards, he managed to escape to France on 1 August 1323. It was there that he later became the lover of Queen Isabella, who was estranged from the King as a result of the Despensers' absolute control over him. She had been sent to France on a peace mission by Edward but used the occasion to seek support from her brother, Charles IV to oust the Despensers. The scandal of their love affair forced them to leave the French court for Flanders, where they obtained help for an invasion of England.

=== Joan's imprisonment ===
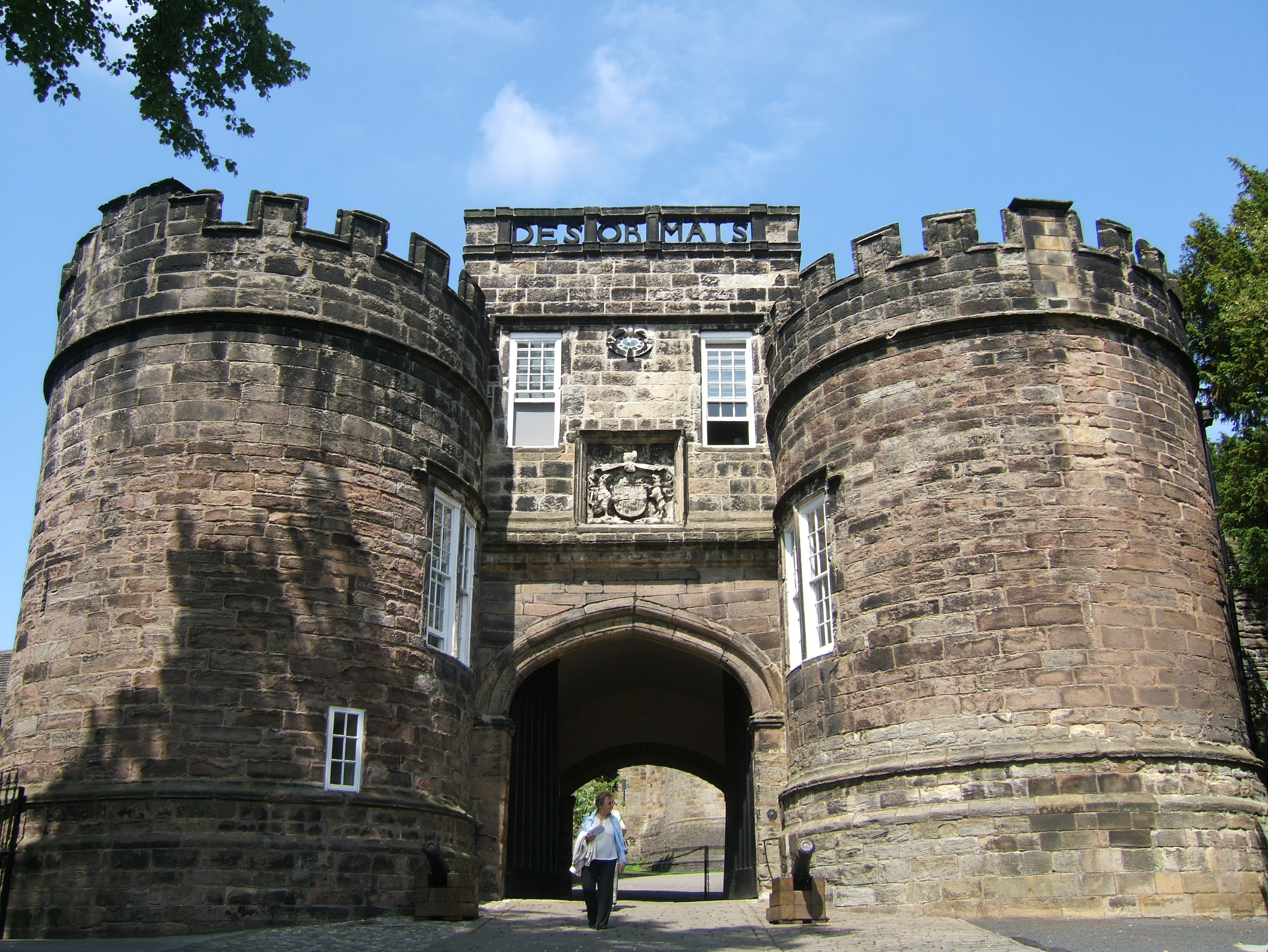
Skipton Castle, Yorkshire, where Joan was imprisoned from 1324 to 1326

While the couple were still in France, King Edward had retaliated against Mortimer by taking Joan and all of their children into custody, and "treating them with severity". In April 1324 Joan was removed from Hampshire where she had been confined in a lodging under house arrest and sent to Skipton Castle in Yorkshire where she was imprisoned in a cell and endured considerable suffering and hardship. Most of her household had been dismissed and she was permitted only a small number of attendants to serve her. She was granted just one mark per day for her necessities, and out of this sum she also had to feed her servants. She was additionally allowed ten marks per annum at Easter and Michaelmas for new clothes. Her daughters suffered worse privations having been locked up inside various religious houses with even less money at their disposal. Joan was transferred from Skipton to Pontefract Castle in July 1326.

=== Countess of March ===
Mortimer and Isabella landed in England two months later in September 1326, and they joined forces with Henry, 3rd Earl of Lancaster. On 16 November, King Edward was taken prisoner and eventually murdered at Berkeley Castle, presumably by Mortimer's hired assassins. From 1327 to 1330, Mortimer and Isabella jointly held the Office of Regent for her son, King Edward III who was duly crowned following his father's death. Mortimer was made constable of Wallingford Castle; in September 1328, Mortimer was created Earl of March. This made Joan henceforth, the Countess of March; although it is not known what she thought about her husband's illegal assumption of power and affair with the Queen. What has been established is that Joan was never an active participant in her husband's insurrection against King Edward.

Mortimer and Queen Isabella were the de facto rulers of England. Hostility against the power Mortimer wielded over the kingdom and the young King Edward III, increased and his former friend Henry of Lancaster encouraged the King to assert his authority to oust Mortimer. When Mortimer ordered the execution of Edmund, Earl of Kent, half-brother of the late King Edward, anger and outrage engulfed the country. The King deposed his mother and her lover. Mortimer was seized, arrested, and on 29 November 1330, hanged at Tyburn, London.

Following her husband's execution, Joan – as the wife of a traitor – was imprisoned again, this time in Hampshire where years before she had been placed under house arrest; her children were also taken into custody. In 1331, she was given an allowance for household expenses; however, her lands were only restored to her in 1336 after King Edward III granted her a full pardon for her late husband's crimes. In 1347 she received back the Liberty of Trim. The majority of the remaining family lands and honours were restored to her grandson Roger Mortimer, 2nd Earl of March.

== Death ==
Joan de Geneville, Baroness Geneville, the widowed Countess of March, died on 19 October 1356 at the age of seventy. She was buried in Wigmore Abbey beside her husband, whose body had been returned to her by Edward III as she had requested. Her tomb no longer exists as the abbey was destroyed during the Dissolution of the Monasteries and only the ruins remain to this day.

Lady Geneville's numerous direct descendants include the current British royal family, Sir Winston Churchill, and American Presidents George Washington, Thomas Jefferson, William Howard Taft, Calvin Coolidge and Franklin D. Roosevelt.

== Ancestry ==
Ancestors of Joan de Geneville, 2nd Baroness Geneville

16. Geoffrey IV of Joinville
8. Simon of Joinville
17. Helvide de Dampierre
4. Geoffrey de Geneville, 1st Baron Geneville
18. Stephen III of Auxonne
9. Beatrix d'Auxonne
19. Beatrix de Thiers, Comtesse de Chalon
2. Sir Piers de Geneville
20. Walter de Lacy, Lord of Trim
10. Gilbert de Lacy
21. Margaret de Braose
5. Maud de Lacy
22. Hugh Bigod, 3rd Earl of Norfolk
11. Isabel Bigod
23. Maud Marshal
1. Joan de Geneville
24. Hugh X of Lusignan, Count of La Marche
12. Hugh XI of Lusignan, Count of La Marche
25. Isabella of Angoulême
6. Hugh XII of Lusignan, Count of La Marche
26. Peter I, Duke of Brittany
13. Yolande de Dreux, Countess of Penthièvre and of Porhoet
27. Alix of Thouars
3. Jeanne of Lusignan
28. Geoffrey, Seigneur de Fougères
14. Raoul III, Sire de Fougères
29. Mathilde de Porhoet
7. Jeanne de Fougères
30. Amaury I, Sire de Craon
15. Isabelle de Craon
31. Jeanne des Roches

== In fiction ==
Joan is a supporting character in Les Rois maudits (The Accursed Kings), a series of French historical novels by Maurice Druon. She was portrayed by Valérie Lang in the 2005 French miniseries adaptation of the series.

Joan is portrayed as the main protagonist in Joan: forgotten Women of history book one by Anne R. Bailey.

Joan is the main protagonist in A Court of Betrayal (2024) by Anne O'Brian.

== Bibliography ==
- Costain, Thomas B. (1958) The Three Edwards. Garden City, New York: Doubleday and Company, Inc.
- Cokayne, George Edward. (2000) The Complete Peerage of England, Scotland, Ireland, Great Britain and the United Kingdom, Extant, Extinct or Dormant, new edition, 13 Volumes in 14 (1910-1959); reprint in 6 Volumes, Gloucester, UK: Alan Sutton Publishing
- Haines, Roy Martin. (2003) King Edward II: Edward of Caernarfon, his life, his reign, and its aftermath. Canada: McGill-Queens University Press
- Mortimer, Ian. (2003) The Greatest Traitor: The Life of Sir Roger Mortimer, Ruler of England, 1327-1330. UK: Jonathan Cape Ltd.
- Seabourne, Gwen (2011) Imprisoning Medieval Women: The Non-Judicial Confinement and Abduction of Women in England, c.1170-1509. Great Britain: Ashgate Publishers Ltd.

Peerage of England
Preceded by Geoffrey de Geneville	Baroness Geneville; 1314–1356	Succeeded by Roger Mortimer, 2nd Earl of March
