= Isabelle de Craon =

- Dame de Fougères
- Born: c. 1212; France
- Noble family: Craon
- Spouses: Raoul III, Sire de Fougères
- Issue: Jean de Fougères; Jeanne de Fougères, suo jure Dame de Fougères
- Father: Amaury I, Sire de Craon
- Mother: Jeanne des Roches

Isabelle de Craon, Dame de Fougères (born c. 1212), was a French noblewoman, being the daughter of Amaury I, Sire de Craon, a wealthy baron who was the possessor of many lordships in Anjou and Maine. She was the wife of Raoul III, Sire de Fougères, by whom she had one daughter, Jeanne de Fougères, who became the heiress to her father's seigneury.

== Family ==
Isabelle was born in 1212, the youngest daughter of Amaury I, Sire de Craon and Jeanne des Roches (c.1195- 28 September 1238). She had a younger brother, Maurice IV, Sire de Craon (1213–1250), who married Isabella of Lusignan, a half-sister of King Henry III of England by whom he had three children. She had an elder sister, Jeanne who was betrothed to the three-year-old Arthur of Brittany in 1223. Arthur died that same year, and nothing further is known about Jeanne.

Isabelle's paternal grandparents were Maurice II de Craon and Isabelle de Meulan. Her maternal grandparents were Guillaume des Roches, Seneschal of Anjou and Marguerite de Sablé. Being the husband of Jeanne, eldest daughter of Guillaume des Roches, the hereditary seneschalship of Anjou and the vast Sablé barony passed to Isabelle's father upon the death of her maternal grandfather on 15 July 1222. Amaury died in 1226, when Isabelle was fourteen years old.

== Marriage and issue ==
On an unknown date sometime before 1230, Isabelle married Raoul III, Sire de Fougères, the son of Geoffrey, Seigneur de Fougères and Mathilde de Porhoet. The marriage was documented in a charter dated February 1233. The chateau of Fougères in Brittany became their principal residence.

Together Raoul and Isabelle had:

- Jean de Fougeres (born and died 6 December 1230)
- Jeanne de Fougères, suo jure Dame de Fougères (died after 1273), on 29 January 1254 married Hugh XII of Lusignan, Count of La Marche, Count of Angoulême, by whom she had six children.

Isabelle died on an unknown date. Her husband Raoul died on 24 February 1256, and his seigneury of Fougères was inherited by their only surviving child, Jeanne who thereafter held the title of suo jure Dame de Fougères.

== Sources ==
- Morvan, Frederic (2009). La Chevalerie bretonne et la formation de l'armee ducale, 1260-1341 (in French). Presses Universitaires de Rennes.
