= Combwell Priory =

Priory in Kent, England

Coordinates: 51°4′26″N 0°26′1″E

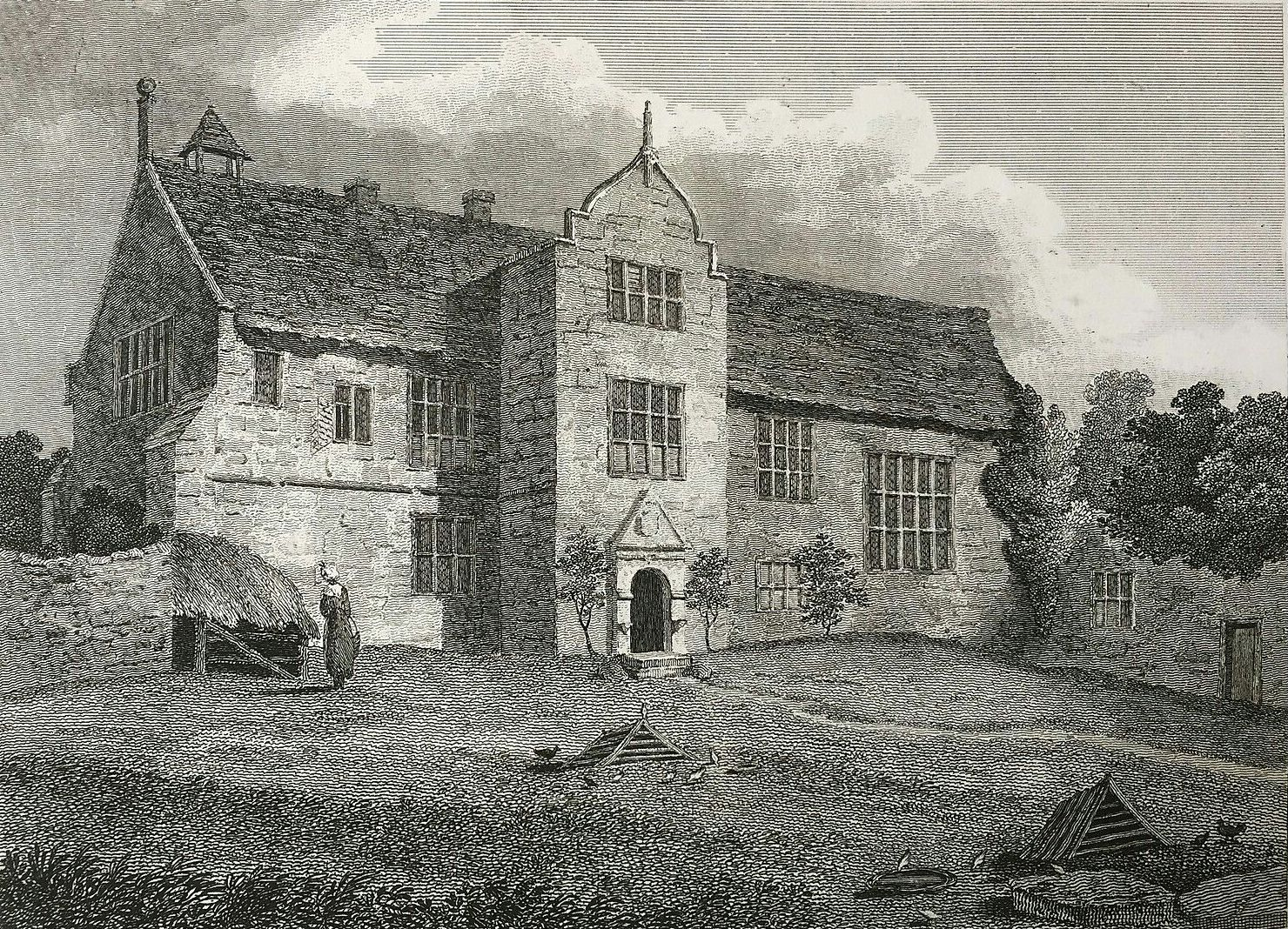
Combwell Priory, 1809

Combwell Priory was a priory near Bedgebury Cross about 10 miles southeast of Tunbridge Wells in Kent, England.

== History ==
This is a Grade II listed building. It was founded as a Premonstratensian abbey by Robert de Thurnham in the reign of Henry II but became an Augustinian priory in 1220. It was suppressed in the dissolution of the monasteries and on 20 November 1537 was granted to Thomas Culpeper, becoming the mansion house of branches of the Culpepper and later Campion families. After 1657 little remained of either the abbey or the later house. Nothing of the original building remains standing although the current private home was built using some of the original building materials.

== Priors of Combwell ==
- Richard Netter (1424)
- Henry (1460).

== Burials ==
- Stephen Thurnham
- Robert of Thornham, founder of this Priory/Abbey and father of Stephen Thurnham and of Robert of Thornham
