= Guy of Lusignan, Count of Angoulême =

Count of Angoulême and La Marche

Guy's seal (1304)

Guy of Lusignan (1269–1308) was the lord of Lusignan, count of La Marche and count of Angoulême from 1303 until his death.

Guy, also called Guiard, was the son of Hugh XII of Lusignan and Jeanne de Fougères. His older brother was Hugh XIII. On 25 May 1283, Hugh XIII named Guy has his universal heir. In 1290, Guy became lord of Archiac. On 12 June 1297, Hugh disinherited him supposedly for assisting Hugh's mortal enemies. Nevertheless, Hugh's death in 1303 sparked a succession crisis, with Guy laying claim to the counties against his nephew, Renaud IV de Pons, son of his sister Yolande. In December 1303, King Philip IV was at Angoulême, having apparently decided to back Guy. An accord between Guy and Renaud was arranged and Guy was placed in control of Lusignan, La Marche and Angoulême. On 1 July 1304, the Parlement of Paris confirmed this decision and authorized Guy to perform homage to the king for the counties. On 22 September, the childless Guy named Yolande his heir.

Guy participated on the side of the king in the Battle of Mons-en-Pévèle and the Siege of Lille in 1304. According to the Chronique de Flandre, he joined a conspiracy against Philip IV, even putting his seal to a letter sent to William of Jülich promising to abandon the king during the battle at Mons-en-Pévèle. The Chronique claims that he fled the battlefield in a panic when the Flemings charged. Whatever the truth of the Chronique's claims, Guy certainly switched sides in 1305. He reached an agreement with the English at Saintes on 29 June, following the election of Pope Clement V earlier that month. He ceded the castles of Cognac and Merpins to the English in return for being made seneschal of Saintonge. He named Edward I of England as his heir for the county of Angoulême. The county of La Marche was not mentioned. It was probably Guy's intention to pass it on to Aymer de Valence.

The agreement of 1305 appears never to have been ratified by Edward I nor publicized. In 1308, Guillaume de Chauvigny, lord of Châteauroux, denounced Guy before King Philip for his homage to Edward. In April, Guy appointed agents to represent him in Paris but died before trial. In September, Aymer de Valence was preparing to sue him for the inheritance of Hugh XIII.

Guy died in November 1308, shortly before 28 November. He had no children and Renaud IV de Pons predeceased him. In April 1308, he had named Renaud's eldest son, Hélie II Rudel, as his universal heir. Guy's death ended the senior male line of the House of Lusignan. Of his sisters, only Yolande had children. Since Guy died with accusations of treason over his head, King Philip put his lands under royal charge. Ultimately, Yolande was recognized as usufructuary countess.

== Bibliography ==
- Petersen Dyggve, Holger (1942). "Personnages historiques figurant dans la poésie lyrique française des XII^{e} et XIII^{e} siècles: Le comte de la Marche". Neuphilologische Mitteilungen. 43 (5): 121–141. JSTOR 43341309.
- Phillips, J. R. S. (1972). Aymer de Valence, Earl of Pembroke, 1307–1324: Baronial Politics in the Reign of Edward II. Clarendon Press.
- Vasselot de Régné, Clément de (2018). Le "Parentat" Lusignan (X^{e}–XIV^{e} siècles): structures, parenté vécue, solidarités et pouvoir d'un lignage arborescent (PhD diss.). University of Nantes.
- Watson, G. W. (1905). "The Families of Lacy, Geneva, Joinville and La March". The Genealogist. 11.
