= Robert I of Alençon =

Robert (died 8 September 1217, in Morteveille (Note: ROBERT d'Alençon (-Morteville 8 Sep 1217, bur Perseigne). « Johannes filius Willelmi comitis Pontivi » donated property to the abbey of Saint-Martin, Troarn with the consent of « filiis meis Johanne et Roberto et Willelmo » by charter dated 1190[246]. He succeeded his brother in 1191 as Comte d'Alençon. A manuscript genealogy of the Lords of Beaumont records the death of « Robertum comitem Alencheii…apud…manerium suum…Morteveille prope La Val ».)), of the house of Montgomery-Bellême, was Count of Alençon from 1191 to 1217. He was the second son of John I, Count of Alençon, and of Béatrix of Maine.

== Biography ==
His father died in February 1191 and his older brother in May 1191, which made him the new count of Alençon. During his life, the war raged between the king of France Philip II and the kings of England Richard the Lionheart and John. In 1203, Robert abandoned his English liege and joined the Capetian camp. In May 1203 the French entered Alençon. This change of allegiance allowed the count of Alençon to keep his lands when the duchy of Normandy had been conquered by Philip II and many Norman lords who had remained loyal to the Plantagenets had their lands confiscated. He had facilitated the conquest of Normandy for the king of France by giving French troops passage over his lands; together with Juhel III de Mayenne and Hugues de Beaussay, he negotiated in Philip's name a two-year truce with the King of England.

King Philip decided to marry off Robert, count of Alençon and Seez, descended from the counts of Ponthieu and lords of Bellême, to Emma de Laval, heir to the barony of Laval. The approval of the king ensured the consent of Avoise de Craon, mother of Emma, and that of the lords of Mayenne, Craon and Beaumont. The ceremony took place at court in 1214.

In 1213 he accompanied Louis, son of the king, who took advantage of the truce with the English to fulfill the vow he had made to go for 40 days to fight the Albigensians. The following year he was one of the peer counts who issued a verdict on the claims of Erard of Brienne-Ramerupt in the county of Champagne; he helped to thwart Erard's efforts and to preserve the rights of the young Theobald IV and his mother, the countess. Then, only three years after his marriage, he returned to die in the barony of Laval, (Note: Charles Maucourt de Bourjolly quotes the cartulary of Saint-Martin de Sées which names Mortuelle or Morteville as the place where Robert died. This name is found in the inheritance of Guy VIII of Laval. Pierre Le Baud instead points to Francaloup, a hunting lodge in the forest of Brée. Francaloup is marked on the map of the diocese of Le Mans by Jaillot. Cassini calls it Trancaloup referring to the place where the current castle of Trancaloup is located, near the junction of the woods of Brée and Hermet.) leaving Emma pregnant with a son, who became Count of Alençon at birth but died at two years old.

== Marriage and children ==
- He first married a Mathilde of whom only the first name is known.
- His second wife was Jeanne de Preuilly (d. 1211), daughter of Gauzbert, lord of Preuilly and Bouchet, and Adélaïde de Vendôme. From this marriage were born:
  - Jean (d. 1212), married to Adèle de Royes, but died without children before his father;
  - Mathilde (d. 1218), married to Theobald VI (d. 1218), count of Blois, Chartres and Clermont. (Note: Daniel Power indicates this is a possibility and not certain.)
- His third wife was Emma de Laval (1200-1264), daughter of Guy V, lord of Laval, and Avoise de Craon. Robert and Emma had one son:
  - Robert II, Count of Alençon, born posthumously and died before January 1220.

His widow, Emma de Laval, remarried to Matthew II, baron de Montmorency, and later to John, lord of Toucy.

== Succession ==
After his death the county of Alençon was inherited by his infant son, who died very quickly. Then, in 1220, King Philip II bought Alençon from Robert's two sisters, Alix and Hélia. The lands of Saosnois, Montgommery, Le Mêle-sur-Sarthe were given to Aimery II, viscount of Châtellerault, son of Alix d'Alençon.

== Sources ==
- Cowper, Frederick A. G. (1959). "Origins and Peregrinations of the Laval-Middleton Manuscript". Nottingham Medieval Studies. 3 (Jan): 3-18.
- Daniell, Christopher (2013). From Norman Conquest to Magna Carta, England 1066–1215. Taylor & Francis.
- Power, Daniel (2004). The Norman Frontier in the twelfth and Early Thirteenth Centuries. Cambridge University Press.
- Tetlow, Elisabeth Meier (2024). The Journey of a Knightly Family: The Hercy/Hersey Family 1000-1650. Wipf and Stock Publishers.
- Dugdale Monasticon III, Shrewsbury Abbey, XI, Genealogia Dominorum Bellismontium, p. 522.
