= Isabelle de Meulan =

French noblewoman (c. 1148–1220)

- Dame de Mayenne; Dame de Craon
- Born: c. 1148
- Died: 10 May 1220; France
- Noble family: House of Beaumont
- Spouses: Geoffroy, Seigneur de Mayenne; Maurice II, Sire de Craon
- Issue: Clémence de Mayenne; Juhel III, Seigneur de Mayenne; Avoise de Craon; Maurice III, Sire de Craon; Pierre de Craon; Philippe de Craon; Amaury I, Sire de Craon; Constance de Craon; Agnes de Craon
- Father: Waleran de Beaumont, 1st Earl of Worcester, Count of Meulan
- Mother: Agnès de Montfort, Dame de Gournay-sur-Marne

Isabelle de Meulan, Dame de Mayenne, Dame de Craon (c. 1148 – 10 May 1220) was a French noblewoman, being the daughter of Waleran de Beaumont, 1st Earl of Worcester, Count of Meulan. Isabelle married twice; firstly to Geoffroy, Seigneur de Mayenne, and secondly to Maurice II, Sire de Craon. Her eldest son Juhel III de Mayenne was a celebrated Crusader.

== Family ==
Isabelle was born in about 1148, the eldest daughter of Waleran de Beaumont, 1st Earl of Worcester, Count of Meulan, and Agnès de Montfort, Dame de Gournay-sur-Marne. She had six brothers and two younger sisters. Her father was a powerful Norman magnate with much wealth and political influence. Her paternal grandparents were Robert de Beaumont, 1st Earl of Leicester and Elisabeth de Vermandois, and her maternal grandparents were Amaury III de Montfort, Count of Evreux, and Agnès de Garlande, daughter of Anseau de Garlande, Count of Rochefort, and Beatrice de Montlhery.

== Marriages and issue ==
In 1161 Isabelle married her first husband, Geoffroy, Seigneur de Mayenne whose first wife Constance of Brittany had died in 1148. Together Geoffroy and Isabelle had:

- Clémence de Mayenne (died before 1209), married Robert de Sablé, Grand Master of the Knights Templar, by whom she had three children including Marguerite de Sablé, Dame de Sablé.
- Juhel III, Seigneur de Mayenne (1168 – 12 April 1220), married Gervaise de Vitré, by whom he had three children. A celebrated Crusader, he was killed in battle in 1220 at the age of fifty-two.
- Matilda, married Andrew de Vitre

Geoffroy died in 1169. Isabelle, aged about twenty-two, married secondly in 1170 Maurice II, Sire de Craon, the son of Hugues I, Sire de Craon. Together they had seven children:

- Avoise de Craon (died 1230), married Guy of Laval and Yves Le Franc.
- Maurice III, Sire de Craon (died after 1224), married and fathered two sons.
- Pierre de Craon (died before 1206)
- Philippe de Craon (died young)
- Amaury I, Sire de Craon (1175–1226), married Jeanne des Roches, the daughter of his half-niece, Marguerite de Sablé, by whom he had three children including Isabelle de Craon. This meant that Isabelle de Meulan's daughter-in-law was also her great-granddaughter.
- Constance de Craon, a nun at the Abbey of Clarei
- Agnes de Craon

Isabelle was appointed guardian of Maurice's lands and their children when he left for Jerusalem on Crusade. The Gesta Guillelm Majoris Andegavensis Episcopi names Isabelle among those present at the burial of the Bishop Guillaume on an unknown date during the reign of King Philip II of France. Her husband died 12 July 1196. Isabelle herself died on 10 May 1220 at the age of about seventy-two years. Her death occurred just a month after the death in battle of her eldest son, Juhel. She was buried in Savigny.

== Sources ==
- Crouch, David (1986). The Beaumont Twins: The Roots and Branches of Power in the Twelfth Century. Cambridge University Press.
- Power, Daniel (2004). The Norman Frontier in the Twelfth and Early Thirteenth Centuries. Cambridge University Press.
