= Jeanne des Roches =

French noble

- suo jure Dame de Sablé, de La Suze, de Briollay, de Mayet, de Loupeland, de Chateauneuf-sur-Sarte, de Genneteil, de Precigné, de Agon; Dame de Craon
- Born: c. 1195; France
- Died: 28 September 1238; France
- Noble family: des Roches
- Spouse: Amaury I, Sire de Craon
- Issue: Maurice IV de Craon, Sire de Craon; Jeanne de Craon; Isabelle de Craon
- Father: Guillaume des Roches, Seneschal of Anjou
- Mother: Marguerite de Sablé, Dame de Sablé

Jeanne des Roches, Dame de Sablé (c. 1195 – 28 September 1238) was a French noble heiress, ruler of de baronies of La Suze, de Briollay, de Mayet, de Loupeland, de Chateauneuf-sur-Sarte, de Genneteil, de Precigné, de Agon, and de Craon; and the suo jure seneschal of Anjou, from 1222. The seneschalship passed to her husband, Amaury I, Sire de Craon, as well as the vast Sablè barony.

== Life ==
Jeanne was born in about 1195, the eldest daughter of Guillaume des Roches, Seneschal of Anjou and one of the greatest barons in Anjou and Maine. Her mother was Marguerite de Sablé, Dame de Sablé who had brought the rich Sablé barony to her husband. Jeanne had a brother Robert, who died in 1204, and a younger sister Clémence, Viscountess de Chateaudun (died after September 1259). Her paternal grandparents were Baudoin des Roches and Alix de Châtellerault, and her maternal grandparents were Robert de Sablé and Clémence de Mayenne, daughter of Geoffroy, Sire de Mayenne and Isabelle de Meulan.

Jeanne's father was a knight who had fought in the Third Crusade in the service of the Angevin kings of England and King Philip II of France.

=== Inheritance ===
Upon her father's death on 15 July 1222 Jeanne, being the eldest surviving child, succeeded to the seneschalship of Anjou, as well as his vast lordships which included Sablé, La Suze, Briollay, Mayet, Loupeland, Chateauneuf-sur-Sarte, Genneteil, Precigné, and the Norman manor of Agon. Jeanne did homage to King Louis IX of France for Senescaltia Andegavie, Cenomannie et Turonie.. bone memorie Guillmus de Ruppiebus, genitor noster...tenuit in a charter dated 27 January 1226.

By March 1219 Jeanne was married to Amaury I, Sire de Craon. He was the son of Maurice II, Sire de Craon and Isabelle de Meulan. Jeanne's mother-in-law, Isabelle de Meulan was also her maternal great-grandmother, as Isabelle had married twice; Geoffroy de Mayenne was her first husband, and Maurice de Craon her second. The seneschalship and barony passed to her husband upon their marriage.

Jeanne died on 28 September 1238. Her husband had died in 1226.

== Issue ==
Together Amaury and Jeanne had three children:

- Maurice IV de Craon, Sire de Craon (1213–1250), married Isabella of Lusignan, half-sister of King Henry III of England, by whom he had three children.
- Jeanne de Craon, bethrothed in 1223 to Arthur of Brittany (1220–1223)
- Isabelle de Craon (born 1212), married Raoul III, Sire de Fougères, by whom she had two children, Jean de Fougères, and Jeanne de Fougères, Dame de Fougères.

== Sources ==
- Morvan, Frederic (2009). La Chevalerie bretonne et la formation de l'armee ducale, 1260-1341 (in French). Presses Universitaires de Rennes.
- Pollock, M.A. (2015). Scotland, England and France After the Loss of Normandy, 1204-1296: "Auld. The Boydell Press.
- Tout, Thomas Frederick (2009). The Place of the Reign of Edward II in English History. Manchester University Press.
