= Guy V de Laval =

Lord of Laval, Mayenne

Guy V de Laval (died 1210) was the Lord of Laval, Mayenne.

== Family ==
Guy was the son of Guy IV de Laval and Emma de Dunstanville. He married Avoise de Craon (died 1230), daughter of Maurice II de Craon. They had issue:

- Guy VI de Laval known as Guyonnet de Laval (died 1211)
- Ozanne, mentioned in a charter of Réau Abbey, cited by Charles Maucourt de Bourjolly
- Emma de Laval (about 1200 - 27 April 1264) who inherited the title in 1211 on the death of her brother Guyonnet. Married Robert I, Count of Alençon (died 1217), Mathieu II de Montmorency (died 1230) and Jean de Choisy et de Toucy.
- Isabeau (Isabelle) de Laval (died 1244) who married Bouchard VI de Montmorency.

== See also ==
- House of Laval

== Sources ==
- Carron, Roland (1989). Enfant et parenté dans la France médiévale Xe-XIIIe siècles (in French). Librairie Droz.
- de Goué, Alain (1911). La croisade mayennaise de 1158: Les premiers seigneurs de Mayenne et de Laval (in French). Imprimerie-Librairie-Reliure Poirier Freres.
- Tetlow, Elisabeth Meier (2024). The Journey of a Knightly Family: The Hercy/Hersey Family 1000-1650. Wipf and Stock Publishers.

Guy V de Laval House of Laval Died: 1210
Preceded by Guy IV de Laval	Lord of Laval – 1210	Succeeded by Guy VI de Laval
