= Avoise de Craon =

Avoise de Craon (before 1178 – c. 1230) was a French noblewoman. She was the daughter of Maurice II de Craon and Isabelle de Meulan. She was the wife of Guy V de Laval.

== Life ==
She was the eldest of the children of Maurice II Craon, and Isabelle de Meulan. In his testament, Maurice II bequeathed her Craon and Châtelais in the case that her three brothers predeceased her.

In about 1198, she married Guy V de Laval. They had:

- Guy VI de Laval known as Guyonnet de Laval (died 1211)
- Ozanne, mentioned in a charter of Réau Abbey, cited by Charles Maucourt de Bourjolly
- Emma de Laval (about 1200 - 27 April 1264) who inherited the title in 1211 on the death of her brother Guyonnet. Married Robert I d'Alençon (died 1217), Mathieu II de Montmorency (died 1230) and Jean de Choisy et de Toucy.
- Isabeau (Isabelle) de Laval (died 1244) who married Bouchard VI de Montmorency.

After the death of Guy V in 1210, Avoise remarried with Yves Le Franc in 1215. According to Gilles Ménage, they had four children.

== Sources ==
- Carron, Roland (1989). Enfant et parenté dans la France médiévale Xe-XIIIe siècles (in French). Librairie Droz.

== See also ==
- House of Laval
- Craon family
