= Comte de la Marche =

Start of Puis que d'Amors in chansonnier X

The Comte de la Marche (or Conte de la Marche) was an anonymous trouvère of the 13th century. His identity is uncertain, but the most likely candidates are Hugh XI of Lusignan (r. 1249–1250) and Hugh XII of Lusignan (r. 1250–1270), with Holger Petersen Dyggve and William Paden leaning towards the latter.

Three songs are attributed to the Comte de la Marche in three chansonniers (K, N, X). They are accompanied by musical notation in all three:

- Puis que d'Amors m'estuet les maus souffrir
- L'autrier chevauchoie seus, a pastourelle avec des refrains
- Tout autresi com li rubiz

In Tout autresi, the Comte recognizes the ruby as the greatest of stones (de toutes pierres meillor).

In L'autrier chevauchoie seus, the poet spots a shepherdess while riding through the countryside. When he approaches her with amorous intent, she begins to run away, saying "I don't want to play with you, my heart yearns for someone else." When the knights turns to leave in anger, she mocks him, "You deserve very little respect, since you never took a sweet kiss and I escaped you!"

== Bibliography ==
- Gontero-Lauze, Valérie (2023). "L'escarboucle, une pierre médiévale aux multiples facettes". In Francesco Solinas; Marie-Laure Cassius-Duranton; Guillaume Glorieux (eds.). L'ornement précieux. Vol. 1. De Luca Editori d'Arte.
- Linker, Robert White (1979). A Bibliography of Old French Lyrics. Romance Monographs.
- Paden, William D. (1987). The Medieval Pastourelle. Vol. 2. Garland Publishing.
- Petersen Dyggve, Holger (1942). "Personnages historiques figurant dans la poésie lyrique française des XII^{e} et XIII^{e} siècles: Le comte de la Marche". Neuphilologische Mitteilungen. 43 (5): 121–141. JSTOR 43341309.
