= Siege of La Roche-aux-Moines =

Coordinates: 47°23′02″N 0°39′23″W

- Part of the Anglo-French Wars
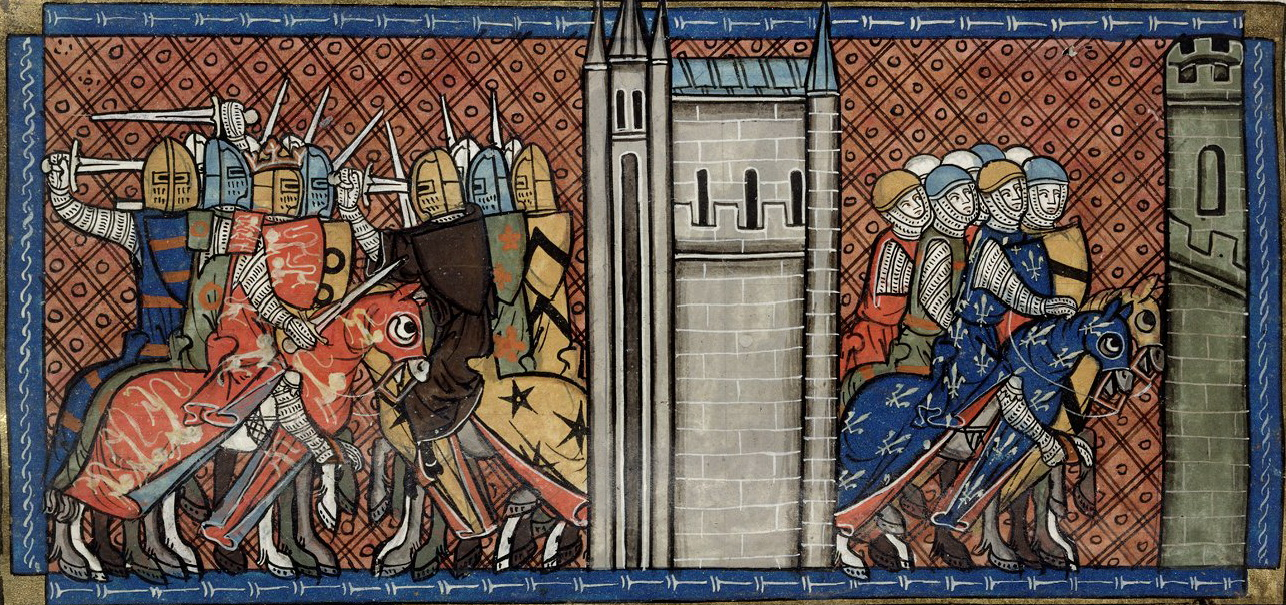
- King John of England in battle with the French (left), Prince Louis VIII of France on the march (right).
| Date | 19 June – 2 July 1214 |
| Location | Savennières, Anjou, Angevin Empire |
| Result | French victory |

Belligerents
| England; Normandy | France |

Commanders and leaders
| King John | Prince Louis |

Strength
| 30,000 men | 2,800–4,800 men 800 knights 2,000–4,000 infantrymen |

Casualties and losses
| Unknown | Unknown |

The siege of La Roche-aux-Moines was an engagement of the Anglo-French War (1213-1214). King John of England besieged the castle but had to retreat in the face of King Philip Augustus' son, Prince Louis.

King John did not want to engage the French army in battle and had opted for a diversionary approach. His goal was to draw the French king and the bulk of his forces south to facilitate the main Imperial-led allied invasion of France from the northeast. The endeavour was initially successful, as King Philip marched to check the English incursion but suddenly decided to return north with the bulk of his troops, which left his son with the task of halting the English king's advance.

Destroying their siege implements, the English hastily withdrew when Prince Louis marched to relieve Roche-au-Moine although they enjoyed a significant numerical superiority. That was not without reason, however, as King John distrusted his Poitevin allies and was afraid of not being supported in case of confrontation. His rearguard suffered severely at the hands of Louis' army during the retreat. The prince pursued him as far as Thouars before turning back to Anjou. King John's efforts were ultimately fruitless, as Philip inflicted a crushing defeat on his allies at the Battle of Bouvines.

== Siege ==
In 1214 John began his final campaign to reclaim Normandy from Philip. John was optimistic, as he had successfully built up alliances with the Holy Roman Emperor Otto IV, Count Ferrand of Flanders, Count Renaud of Boulogne, Duke Henry I of Brabant, Count William I of Holland, Duke Theobald I of Lorraine and Duke Henry III of Limburg. He was also enjoying papal favour and had successfully built up substantial funds to pay for the deployment of his experienced army. Nonetheless, when John left for Poitou in February 1214, many barons refused to provide military service; mercenary knights had to fill the gaps. John's plan was to split Philip's forces by pushing north-east from Poitou towards Paris, and Otto, Renaud and Ferdinand, supported by William Longespée, were to march south-west from Flanders. John's plan of campaign was quite ambitious and was the project of a great strategic combination; unfortunately, it required accurate timing, a thing impossible to secure when the distances were great and communications difficult.

John crossed to Aquitaine with his force at a very unusual season. Sailing from Portsmouth, they landed at La Rochelle on 15 February 1214. He called the feudal levies of Guyenne to reinforce him and marched into Poitou, where he was joined by Hugh IX of Lusignan and by Hervé, Count of Nevers. Making a great display of his troops, John overran Poitou in March, then crossed the Loire and invaded Anjou, the ancient patrimony of his house. As he expected, the King of France marched to check the invasion, taking with him his son, Louis, and the pick of the feudal levies of his realm. Moving by Saumur and Chinon, he endeavoured to cut off John's line of retreat towards Aquitaine. However, abandoning Anjou, the English king hastened rapidly southward, and, evading the enemy, reached Limoges on 3 April. By those operations, John had drawn Philip far to the south. Philip, however, refused to pursue John any farther and, after ravaging the revolted districts of Poitou, marched homewards. At Châteauroux, he handed over a few thousand troops to his son and returned with the rest to the north.

John was still determined to tie down as large a force as possible. When he heard Philip had departed, he at once faced about and re-entered Poitou in May. Rapidly passing the Loire, he again invaded Anjou and, after subduing many towns, laid siege to the strong castle of Roche-au-Moine on 19 June. He had lain in front of it for fifteen days when Prince Louis marched to it with his relief army, reinforced by Angevin levies under William des Roches and Amaury I de Craon. However, despite his significantly larger army, the English king was not prepared to fight, as he deemed his Poitevin allies to be untrustworthy. He recrossed the Loire on 3 July and retreated to La Rochelle, with his rearguard suffering immensely at the hands of the French forces in the process.

== Aftermath ==
Shortly afterwards, Philip won the hard-fought battle of Bouvines in the north-east against Otto and John's other allies, which brought an end to John's hopes of retaking Normandy. A peace agreement was signed in which John returned Anjou to Philip and paid the French king compensation; the truce was intended to last for six years. John arrived back in England in October.

== Sources ==
- Castex, Jean-Claude (2012). Répertoire des combats franco-anglais du Haut Moyen-Âge. Les Ã ditions du Phare-Ouest.
- Oman, Charles (3 August 2012). A History of the Art of War: The Middle Ages from the Fourth to the Fourteenth Century. Tales End Press. ISBN 978-1-62358-003-2.
- Barlow, Frank (1999). The Feudal Kingdom of England, 1042–1216. Harlow, UK: Pearson Education. ISBN 0-582-38117-7.
- Carpenter, David (2004). The Struggle for Mastery: The Penguin History of Britain 1066–1284. London: Penguin. ISBN 978-0-14-014824-4.
- Verbruggen, J.F. (1997) [1954]. De Krijgskunst in West-Europa in de Middeleeuwen, IXe tot begin XIVe eeuw [The Art of Warfare in Western Europe During the Middle Ages: From the Eighth Century to 1340]. Translated by Willard, S. (2nd ed.). Suffolk: Boydell Press. ISBN 0-85115-630-4.
- Warren, W. Lewis (1991). King John. London: Methuen. ISBN 0-413-45520-3.
- Martin Aurell. “La bataille de la Roche-aux-Moines. Jean sans Terre et la prétendue traîtrise des Poitevins“. Comptes-rendus des séances de l'Académie des inscriptions et belles-lettres, Paris : Durand : Académie des inscriptions et belles-lettres, 2017, Année 2017 (Fascicule 1), pp. 459–489.
