= Etienne de Tours =

Official in 12th-century Gaul

The Angevin holdings in France during Stephen's tenure.

Etienne de Tours or Stephen of Tours and Later Stephen of Marçey was a Seneschal of Anjou in the 12th century. He was appointed in 1181 CE by the Angevin King Henry II of England. He was imprisoned by Henry's son the future King Richard I of England on suspicion of fiscal mismanagement. He was freed after being absolved of any wrong. He was restored to the position from 1190 to 1196. Between his two terms, the position was held by Payen de Rochefort-sur-Loire.

Sometime during this period he built a chateau at Marçey et Loire and became known as Etienne de Marçey (often transliterated in English spelling as Marsay as no cedilla exists in the English Alphabet). He was sometimes credited with the creation or possession of a brazen head.
