= Stephen Thurnham =

British justice and administrator (d. 1214)

Stephen of Thurnham (died 6 March 1214) was an English justice and administrator. He was the son of Robert of Thurnham, a Kentish landowner, and the older brother of Robert of Thurnham. He first came to official attention in 1170 when, along with his father, he acted as a benefactor to Combwell Priory. He served Henry II, and in 1188 was one of the agents tasked with ensuring the return of normal religious service in Canterbury after a dispute between the archbishop and local monks, with Henry rewarding him for his work with lands in Artington, Surrey. After Henry died in 1189, Stephen served Richard I with the same loyalty and skill. In 1190 he accompanied Richard on the Third Crusade, visiting Jerusalem in 1192, and in 1193 he escorted Queen Berengaria, Joan of England and the Damsel of Cyprus on their journey from Palestine to Rome.

After this his work was limited to England, managing royal demesnes and escheats, as well as vacant bishoprics. Although these jobs made the holder unpopular, he apparently had a good reputation, with Adam of Eynsham describing him as "a faithful and godly man and devoted to our holy bishop." From 1197 until 1200 he served as High Sheriff of Berkshire and Wiltshire, and in 1198 as High Sheriff of Lancashire. His royal favour faltered after 1200, but he was still a favorite of King John, serving at various times as warden to Eleanor, Fair Maid of Brittany, Isabella of Angoulême and the future Henry III. He died on 6 March 1214 with no sons, leaving his possessions to his five daughters and their husbands.

Honorary titles
Preceded by Unknown	High Sheriff of Berkshire; 1193–1194	Succeeded by Unknown
Preceded by William of Salisbury	High Sheriff of Wiltshire; 1194–1203	Succeeded by William Longespée
Preceded by Nicholas le Boteler	High Sheriff of Lancashire; 1194–1203	Succeeded by Robert de Tateshall
