= Amaury I de Craon =

French noble

- Arms of the Craon family.
- Born: 1170; Craon, Mayenne
- Died: 2 May 1226 (aged 55–56)
- Burial place: La Roë Abbey; 47°53′45″N 01°06′37″W
- Spouse: Jeanne des Roches
- Children: Maurice IV of Craon; Isabelle de Craon
- Military career
- Conflicts: Battle of Roche-au-Moine; Albigensian Crusade

Signature
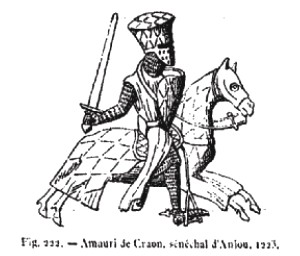

Amaury I of Craon (1170–1226), was Lord of Craon, of Chantocé, Ingrandes, Candé, Segré, Duretal, Baugé and of Lude.

== Early life and family ==
Amaury I of Craon was the youngest of the three sons of Maurice II de Craon (1132-1196) and Isabelle de Beaumont-le-Roger. He had four sisters of whom Havoise de Craon (1175-1251) was also the eldest child.

In 1206, Amaury was given Ploërmel by the King of France, Philip II. By 1207, he succeeded, as Lord of Craon, his brother Maurice III de Craon (1165-1207) who died that year. His other brother, Pierre, an ecclesiastic, was excluded from the title.

In 1212, he married Jeanne des Roches, daughter of Seneschal of Anjou, Guillaume des Roches and Marguerite de Sablé.

They had:

- Maurice IV of Craon, married Isabella of Lusignan
- Isabelle, married Raoul III, lord of Fougeres and Porhoet

== Military career ==
The 2 July 1214, he fought alongside the future King of France, Louis VIII at the Battle of Roche-au-Moines, which saw a French victory, thanks to the decisive action of his father-in-law, Guillaume des Roches against the English troops of "Jean sans Terre" John, King of England.

By November 1218, Amaury had arrived in Toulouse with an army as part of the Albigensian Crusade. He argued with Simon de Montfort as to the disposition of the army and instead of marching the army to the siege of Toulouse, per Montfort's wishes, the army encamped in "New Toulouse". During the siege of Toulouse, Amaury and numerous other nobles openly criticized Montfort's tactics. The siege was lifted a month later following the death of Montfort.

In 1222, following the death of Guillaume des Roches, Amaury took the title of sénéchal of Anjou, Maine and Touraine. He was thus confronted with the pretension of Pierre Mauclerc, Peter I, Duke of Brittany, who had his sights on Anjou. In 1223, he seized Châteaubriant and La Guerche-de-Bretagne belonging to the domain of Pouancé, but he could not take the Castle of Pouancé. Alerted, Pierre Mauclerc came to the rescue and surprised Amaury's exhausted troops. Routed, Amaury was taken prisoner. A large ransom was demanded from his subjects for his liberation. Freed the same year, Amaury rejoined the new King Louis VIII at Compiègne.

== Death and succession ==
Amaury I died on 2 May 1226. He was buried in La Roë Abbey. His wife, Jeanne des Roches, became guardian of their son Maurice IV de Craon (1213-1250), future Seneschal of Anjou. She took the title of sénéchal of Anjou, Maine and Touraine. In 1227, she rendered homage to the new young King of France; Louis IX, better known under the name of Saint Louis, aged only thirteen years. She retained the role of Seneschal until the end of her days about 1240/1241 when the title passed to her son, Maurice.

== See also ==
- Craon family

== Sources ==
- Galand, Gérard (2005). Les seigneurs de Châteauneuf-sur-Sarthe en Anjou: de Robert le Fort à la Révolution [The Lords of Châteauneuf-sur-Sarthe in Anjou: from Robert le Fort to the Revolution] (in French). Turquant (Saumurois): éditions Cheminements. ISBN 9782844784025. OCLC 470460091.
- Marvin, Laurence W. (2008). The Occitan War: A Military and Political History of the Albigensian Crusade, 1209-1218. Cambridge University Press.
- Morvan, Frederic (2009). La Chevalerie bretonne et la formation de l'armee ducale, 1260-1341 (in French). Presses Universitaires de Rennes.
- Painter, Sidney (1936). "Documents on the History of Brittany in the Time of St. Louis". Speculum. 11, No. 4 Oct. (4). The University of Chicago Press: 470–472. doi:10.2307/2848539. JSTOR 2848539. S2CID 162867268.
