= Yolanda of Lusignan =

- Countess of La Marche
- Born: 24 March 1257; Angoulême, France
- Died: 30 September 1314 (aged 57)
- Noble family: Lusignan
- Spouses: Elie Rudel, Seigneur de Pons; Robert, Seigneur de Mathe
- Issue: Renaud IV de Pons; Yolande de Pons
- Father: Hugh XII of Lusignan, Count of La Marche, Count of Angoulême
- Mother: Jeanne de Fougères, Dame de Fougères

Yolanda of Lusignan or Yolande I de Lusignan, Countess of La Marche (24 March 1257 – 30 September 1314) was a French noblewoman and peeress.

In 1308, she succeeded her brother Guy I as suo jure Dame of Lusignan, of Couhé and of Peyrat, and suo jure Countess of La Marche; but not as Countess of Angoulême since after her brother's death the county was sold by her sisters, Joan and Isabelle, to King Philip IV and annexed to the French Crown. Yolanda was also the heiress of Fougères, which she succeeded to upon her mother's death sometime after 1273.

== Life ==
Yolanda was born in Angoulême, France on 24 March 1257. She was the eldest child of Hugh XII of Lusignan, Seigneur de Lusignan, Couhe, et de Peyrat, Count of La Marche, Count of Angoulême, (died in 1270 on Crusade) and Jeanne de Fougères, Dame de Fougères. She had two brothers and three sisters.

=== Reign ===
Yolanda succeeded as the heiress of Fougères upon her mother's death which occurred sometime after 1273. In 1308, Yolanda inherited her brother Guy's titles, becoming suo jure Countess of La Marche, Dame of Lusignan, of Couhe, and of Peyrat. His county of Angoulême did not pass to her as it had been sold by her sisters after Guy's death to King Philip IV, and annexed to the French crown.

In 1270, when she was thirteen, Yolanda's father was killed while on Crusade with King Louis IX of France.

Jeanne the mother of Yolanda was granted the wardship of her minor children in November 1271. Yolandas mother managed to manage her lands and raised her children in the politically turbulent period following her husband's death, ensuring the protection and prosperity of her domains. She died on an unknown date after 1273.

=== Death ===
Following her death on 30 September 1314, the county of La Marche was annexed by King Philip IV of France and given as an appanage to Philip's son Charles IV of France.

== Issue ==
On an unknown date before 1281, she married her first husband, Elie Rudel, Seigneur de Pons, Lord of Montignac and by him she had two children:

- Renaud IV de Pons and de Bergerac (born before 1282–1308), married Isabeau de Levis by whom he had issue
- Yolande de Pons (born before 1290–?), married Foulques III, Baron de Matha by whom she had issue.

Yolanda married secondly Robert, Seigneur de Mathe.

== Sources ==
1. Les Sires de Pons et leurs Alliances (dont la maison de Rabaine).
