= Marguerite de Sablé =

- suo jure Dame de Sablé, La Suze, Briollay, Mayet, Loupeland, Genneteil, Precigné, Agon
- Born: c.1179 France
- Died: after June 1238; France
- Noble family: de Sablé
- Spouse: William des Roches
- Issue: Robert des Roches; Jeanne des Roches; Clemence des Roches
- Father: Robert IV de Sablé
- Mother: Clémence de Mayenne

Marguerite de Sablé, Dame de Sablé (c.1179 – after June 1238), was a French noblewoman and one of the wealthiest heiresses in the counties of Anjou and Maine. She was the eldest daughter of Robert IV de Sablé, and the wife of William des Roches, Seneschal of Anjou, who two years after his marriage to Marguerite became one of the greatest barons in Anjou and Maine, her considerable inheritance having passed to him upon her father's death in 1193.

== Family ==
Marguerite was born in about 1179, the eldest daughter of Robert IV de Sablé and Clémence de Mayenne (died before 1209), daughter of Geoffroy III, Seigneur de Mayenne. Marguerite had a brother Robert who died as a child, and a younger sister, Philippa, wife of Geoffroy Marteau. Her maternal uncle was Juhel III de Mayenne (1168- 12 April 1220), a celebrated Crusader.

Her father was a Grand Master of the Knights Templar (1191–1193), and Lord of Cyprus (1191–1192); he was also a wealthy and powerful Angevin baron and landowner. Upon his death in the Holy Land on 23 September 1193, the lordships and lands, mostly in the River Sarthe valley passed to Marguerite, making her one of the wealthiest heiresses in Anjou and Maine. However, her honours and vast landholdings went to her husband, whom she had married two years earlier.

== Marriage and issue ==
In 1190, Marguerite became the second wife of William des Roches, Seneschal of Anjou; a knight during the Third Crusade in the service of the Angevin kings of England and King Philip II of France. He was the son of Baudoin des Roches and Alix de Châtellerault. His first wife, Philippa had died childless. Upon the death of her father in 1193, Marguerite, being the eldest daughter had consequently succeeded him. She brought to William the lordships of Sablé, La Suze, Briollay, Mayet, Loupeland, Genneteil, Precigné, and the Norman manor of Agon; this made him one of the greatest barons in Anjou and Maine.

Together William and Marguerite had three children:

- Robert des Roches (died 1204)
- Jeanne des Roches (c.1195- 28 September 1238), married Amaury I, Sire de Craon, by whom she had issue including a son Maurice IV de Craon, Sire de Craon (1213–1250), who married Isabelle de Lusignan, a half-sister of King Henry III of England; and two daughters, Jeanne, and Isabelle (born 1212), wife of Raoul III, Sire de Fougères.
- Clémence des Roches (died after September 1259), married firstly Theobald VI, Count of Blois; and secondly Geoffrey VI, Viscount de Chateaudun, by whom she had issue, including a daughter, Jeanne, Dame de Chateaudun

William died on 15 July 1222. The Sablé barony and hereditary seneschalship passed on to Amaury I de Craon, husband of Jeanne, the eldest daughter of William and Marguerite.

Marguerite died sometime after June 1238, and she was buried in Perray-aux-Nonnains.
