= Robert of Thurnham =

12th and 13th-century Anglo-Norman royal official and soldier

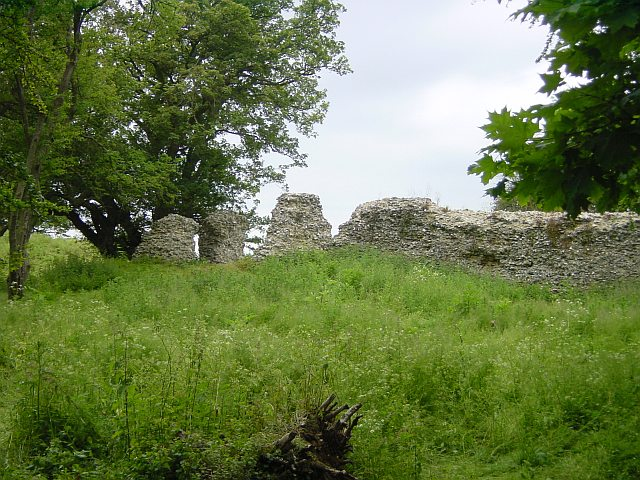
Thurnham is the namesake of Thurnham Castle.

Robert of Thurnham (sometimes Thornham, Tornham, or Turnham) (died 1211) was an English soldier and administrator. The namesake of his landowner father, he was the younger brother of Stephen of Thurnham. Robert made his reputation in connection with the conquest of Cyprus in 1191 during the Third Crusade. On order of King Richard I, he led half the fleet in that battle. Subsequently, he was responsible for controlling the island when the Crusaders moved on, first jointly with Richard de Camville and then independently, when he defeated a group of Cypriot rebels. After he left Cyprus, Robert became more closely identified with Richard I. As the king's familiaris, he carried Richard's equipment from the Holy Land to England. When Richard I was captured in 1192 in Vienna, among the terms of his release was the presentation of men to stand as "pledges" that the ransom would be paid. Robert was among these hostages, though evidently not for long, as he was back by the king's side in 1194 at Poitiers. Appointed Seneschal of Anjou, he served in France with Richard I, primarily in Anjou and Normandy, throughout the rest of Richard's reign. At around the same time, he was also appointed High Sheriff of Surrey, but he did not return to England until after Richard's death. In 1196, he led troops at Richard's behest into Brittany on an unsuccessful attempt to capture the child Duke of Brittany Arthur, whose mother Constance was resistant to Richard's control. In 1197, King Richard arranged for Robert to marry Isabella Fossard, daughter and heiress of the powerful Yorkshire baron William Fossard. The Fossard inheritance included the castle, honor, and lordship of Mulgrave with 34.5 attached knight's fees.

Robert was not with Richard at the siege of Château de Chalus-Chabrol in 1199, where Richard died, and after Richard's death became an important source of information about the activities of the king. After Richard's death, Robert ceremonially transferred Chinon castle to the new king, Richard's brother John. He traveled with John in Normandy and England for several years before he was appointed the Seneschal of Poitou and of Gascony in 1201. He was the first Englishman ever appointed to this function. For the next several years he was troubled by conflict with the French and by rebellious barons in Poitou, which caused him to limit his efforts to his northern territories. In 1203, he made an effort to regain the city of Angers from the French, but though he partially destroyed the city he was unsuccessful and was captured. Ransomed in 1205, he continued to serve John, travelling with him during the Anjou campaign of 1206. From 1205 to 1207 he focused on his service as High Sheriff of Surrey before returning in 1207 to France, but not as Seneschal of Poitou, since Savary de Mauléon is still holding the office. He died on 26 April 1211 with the Bishop of Winchester at his deathbed.

Robert's heir was his daughter Isabella, who married Peter de Maulay in 1214.

== Sources ==
- Gillingham, John (1999). Richard I. Yale University Press. ISBN 0-300-09404-3.
- Summerson, Henry (2004). "Thornham [Turnham], Robert of". Oxford Dictionary of National Biography (online ed.). Oxford University Press. doi:10.1093/ref:odnb/27884. (Subscription, Wikipedia Library access or UK public library membership required.)
- Tranchant Marie (2020). "Une stratégie au service de la réussite : Robert de Thurnham, un officier anglais en Aquitaine (1189-1211)". Annales de Bretagne et des pays de l'Ouest, 2020/4, 127–4, pp. 35–51. doi: 10.4000/abpo.6461 .
- Vincent, Nicholas (2004). "Maulay [Malo Lacu], Peter de". Oxford Dictionary of National Biography (online ed.). Oxford University Press. doi:10.1093/ref:odnb/18375. (Subscription, Wikipedia Library access or UK public library membership required.)

Government offices
Preceded by Payen de Rochefort	Seneschal of Anjou; 1196–1199	Succeeded by Aimery VII of Thouars; William des Roches
