= Bouchard VI de Montmorency =

Baron of Montmorency

Bouchard VI of Montmorency (1203–1243), baron of Montmorency, lord of Écouen, of Conflans-Sainte-Honorine, of Feuillarde, of Château-Basset, of Mourning, of Épinay, of Saint-Brice, of Groslay and of Taverny. He fought at the battle of Taillebourg and died in 1243.

== Life ==
Born in 1203, Bouchard was the son of Matthew II of Montmorency, Baron de Montmorency and constable of France. His mother was Gertrude de Nesle-Soissons, daughter of Ralph, Count of Soissons.

Continuing his father's policy, Bouchard was one of the royal officers sent to fight the Count of La Marche. In 1242, he fought at the battle of Taillebourg, where the troops of King Louis IX of France defeated those of King Henry III of England.

== Marriage and descendants ==
In August 1228, Bouchard married Isabel de Laval (1202–1244), daughter of Guy V de Laval and Havoise de Craon. They had:

- Matthew III of Montmorency (died in 1270), married Jeanne of Brienne
- Thibault de Montmorency (died c.1268), canon
- Bouchard VII of Montmorency (died c. 1284), married Philippa Britaud, daughter of Jean Britaud, lord of Nangis and constable of Sicily, and his wife Marguerite
- Havoise de Montmorency (died c. 1286), married Anseau IV of Garlande, lord of Tournan en Brie

== Sources ==
- Civel, Nicolas (2006). La fleur de France: Les seigneurs d'Ile-de-France au XII siecle (in French). Brepols.
- Henneman, John Bell Jr (1995). "Montmorency". Medieval France: An Encyclopedia. Routledge. pp. 634–635.
- Painter, Sidney (2019). The Scourge of the Clergy: Peter of Dreux, Duke of Brittany. Johns Hopkins University Press.
