= Château de Merpins =

- Merpins, Charente-Maritime, France
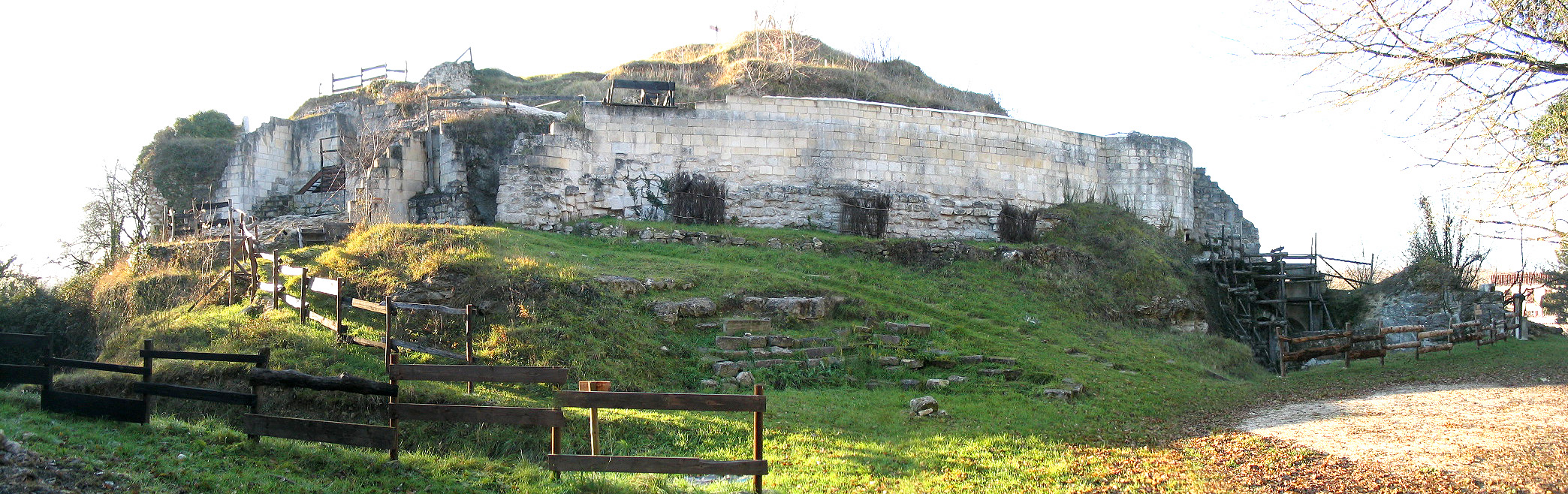
- Ruins of Château de Merpins in 2005.

Location
- Coordinates: 45°40′35″N 0°23′45″W

Site history
- Built: 10th century

Château de Merpins, is a ruined castle in Merpins, Charente-Maritime, France. The castle is built atop a rocky outcrop overlooking the double confluence of the Ne, Charente and Antenne.

Fortifications have existed since the Neolithic period. In the 10th century the manor belonged to the Taillefer, counts of Angoulême. In 1179, the castle was taken by Richard, Duke of Aquitaine and given to his illegitimate son Philippe de Falcombridge. Philippe sold the castle to King John of England in 1204. His son King Henry III of England gave the castle to Hugh X de Lusignan, lord of Cognac, husband of Isabelle d'Angouleme. In 1308 Merpins was united to the French crown, however under the Treaty of Brétigny of 1360, the castle returned to English hands.

After a siege lasting six years, led by Marshal Sancerre the castle was taken again in 1387. King Charles VI of France ordered the castles destruction. The castle was still a place of fighting during the wars of religion, occupied by Catholics and Protestants. It was the Duke of Mayenne who dislodged them in 1577.
