= Hugh XI of Lusignan =

13th-century French nobleman

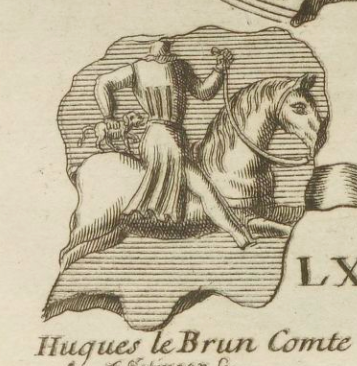

Hugh XI de Lusignan or Hugh VI of La Marche (c. 1221 – 6 April 1250) was a 13th-century French nobleman. He succeeded his mother Isabelle of Angoulême, former queen of England, as Count of Angoulême in 1246. He likewise succeeded his father Hugh X as Count of La Marche in 1249. Hugh XI was the half-brother of King Henry III of England.

== Life ==
Hugh XI was betrothed in 1224 to Joan of Toulouse, the daughter and heiress of Raymond VII, Count of Toulouse and his wife Sancha de Aragón. The betrothal was later broken and Joan was married to Alphonse, Count of Poitiers, brother of King Louis IX of France.

By the Treaty of Vendôme in March 1227, Hugh XI was next betrothed to Isabelle of France, the daughter of Louis VIII of France and Blanche of Castile. However, Isabelle would later break off their marriage plans. (Note: After Isabelle broke the betrothal to Hugh XI she broke a subsequent betrothal to Conrad IV of Germany.)

Hugh XI is a candidate for the trouvère known only as the Conte de la Marche.

== Marriage and family ==
Hugh XI married Yolande of Brittany (1218 – 1272) in 1236, the daughter of Peter I of Brittany and Alix of Thouars.

- Hugh XII of Lusignan. Married Jeanne de Fougères
- Guy de Lusignan (died 1288/89)
- Geoffrey de Lusignan (died 1264)
- Alice (or Alix) de Lusignan ( after October 1236- May 1290). Married Gilbert de Clare, 7th Earl of Gloucester
- Mary (or Marie) de Lusignan (1242-after 11 July 1266). Married Robert de Ferrers, 6th Earl of Derby
- Isabelle de Lusignan, lady of Belleville (1248–1304). Married Maurice de Belleville
- Yolande de Lusignan (died 10 November 1305). Married Pierre I, seigneur of Préaux

Hugh XI's wife Yolande never remarried.

== Death ==
In 1249 he agreed to serve the count of Poitiers for a year on the Seventh Crusade. Hugh was killed on 6 April 1250 during the Battle of Fariskur, which was the last major battle of the Seventh Crusade. He was on crusade with Louis IX of France. His son Hugh XII succeeded him as Count of La Marche and Angoulême. (Note: Hugh XI's wife Yolande survived him. Upon her death, her Breton entitlements reverted to the House of Dreux in the name of her brother, John I, Duke of Brittany. This effectively ended any significant future interaction of Hugh's XI's family with the Duchy of Brittany.)

== Sources ==
- Davenport, Millia (1975). The Secular Spirit: Life and Art at the End of the Middle Ages. The Metropolitan Museum of Art.
- Morvan, Frederic (2009). La Chevalerie bretonne et la formation de l'armee ducale (in French). Presses Universitaires de Rennes.
- Petersen Dyggve, Holger (1942). "Personnages historiques figurant dans la poésie lyrique française des XII^{e} et XIII^{e} siècles: Le comte de la Marche". Neuphilologische Mitteilungen. 43 (5): 121–141. JSTOR 43341309.
- Pollock, M.A. (2015). Scotland, England and France after the Loss of Normandy, 1204-1296. The Boydell Press.
- Taylor, Claire (2005). Heresy in Medieval France: Dualism in Aquitaine and the Agenais, 1000-1249. The Boydell Press.
