= Hugh XII of Lusignan =

13th-century French noble

Hugh XII de Lusignan, Hugh VII of La Marche or Hugh III of Angoulême (c. 1235/1240 – after 25 August 1270). He was the son of Hugh XI of Lusignan and Yolande of Brittany. He succeeded his father as seigneur of Lusignan, Couhé, and Peyrat, Count of La Marche and Count of Angoulême in 1250.

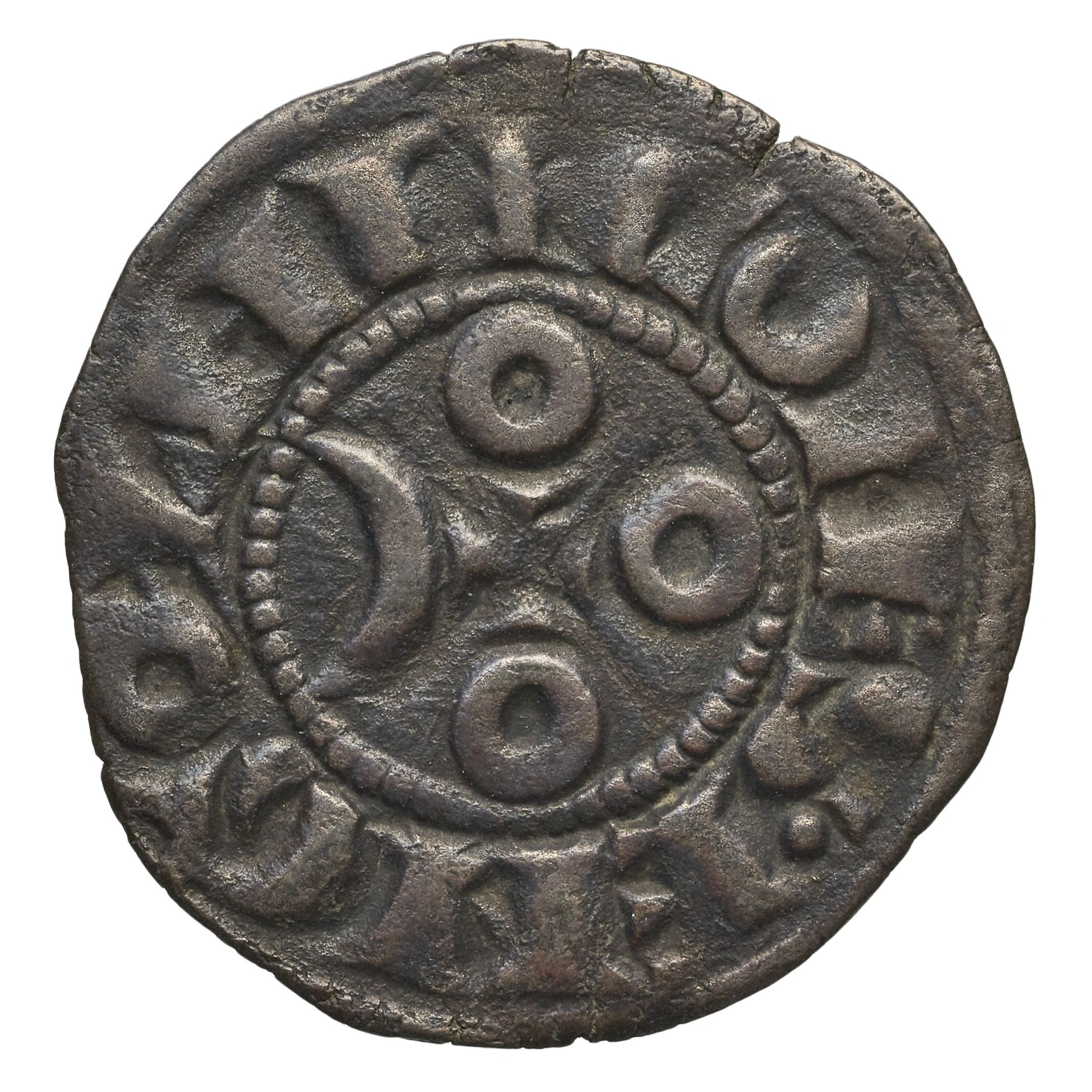
Coin of Angoulême under Hugh XII

On 29 January 1253/4, at Fougères, he married Jeanne de Fougères (d. aft.1273), daughter of Raoul III, seigneur of Fougères, and Isabelle de Craon. They had six children:

- Hugh XIII of Lusignan
- Guy of Lusignan, Count of Angoulême
- Yolande de Lusignan
- Jeanne of Lusignan, married (1st) Bernard-Ezy I, seigneur of Albret; (2nd) Sir Peter de Geneville, Knt.
- Marie de Lusignan (d. aft. 1312), married in 1288 Etienne II, Count of Sancerre (d. c. 1306)
- Isabelle de Lusignan, married Jean of Vesci.

Hugh XII is the most likely candidate to be the trouvère (poet-composer) known only as the Conte de la Marche.

== Death ==
Hugh XII de Lusignan died in 1270 while on Crusade with King Louis IX of France in an early battle of the Eighth Crusade. His eldest son Hugh XIII de Lusignan succeeded him.

== Sources ==
- Morvan, Frederic (2009). La Chevalerie bretonne et la formation de l'armee ducale, 1260-1341 (in French). Presses Universitaires de Rennes.
- Petersen Dyggve, Holger (1942). "Personnages historiques figurant dans la poésie lyrique française des XII^{e} et XIII^{e} siècles: Le comte de la Marche". Neuphilologische Mitteilungen. 43 (5): 121–141. JSTOR 43341309.
- Cinquième Série (1930). "BULLETIN DE L'ACADÉMIE DES INSCRIPTIONS". Revue Archéologique (in French). T. 32 JUILLET-DÉCEMBRE. Editions Belin.
