= Seneschal of Anjou =

The seneschal of Anjou (siniscallus, Vulgar or old Frankish Latin, also dapifer) was an officer of an aristocratic household assigned to manage the domestic affairs of the lords of Anjou. During the course of the twelfth century, the seneschalship also became an office of military command.

== Power of the Angevin Seneschals ==
The seneschal came also to act as a business manager, coordinating between the receivers of various landholdings and the chamber, camera or treasury, and the chancellory or chapel. When the counts of Anjou began acquiring large territorial holdings outside of their traditional patrimony, their rule became more and more absentee. With the rule of Henry II of England, the office of seneschal had become almost vice-regal. The seneschals of Anjou, like those appointed in Normandy, Poitou, and Gascony had custody of demesne fortresses, the regional treasuries, and presidency of the highest court of regional custom. Although there is no direct evidence that an Exchequer court of Anjou existed, traces of a Poitevin Exchequer and detailed records of the Gascon Exchequers during the reign of Henry III of England would indicate that there most likely was a functioning exchequer, probably at Chinon which served as the central treasury and chief stronghold of Anjou, Maine, and Touraine.

== Seneschals appointed by the Angevin kings of England ==
- Etienne de Tours or Etienne de Marsay, knight (Latin: miles) of Tours (appointed no later than 1160, served until 1189)
- Payen de Rochefort, lord of Rochefort-sur-Loire (1189–1190)
- Etienne de Tours or Marçey (restored, 1190–1196)
- Robert of Thornham (1196–1199), English knight, eventual lord of Mulgres (Mulgrave Castle), his nephew Thomas de Furnes was castellan of Angers in 1199
- Aimery VII, viscount of Thouars (1199–1200)
- William des Roches, lord of Sable, (1200–1202)
- Brice the Chamberlain (1202–1203)

== Capetian seneschals of Anjou ==
- William des Roches, (1199–1200, 1204–1222)
- Amauri I de Craon, lord of Craon and Sable (1222–1226)

The office continued down the male line of the Craon family.
