= Aconbury Priory =

Coordinates: 51.9974°N 2.7021°W

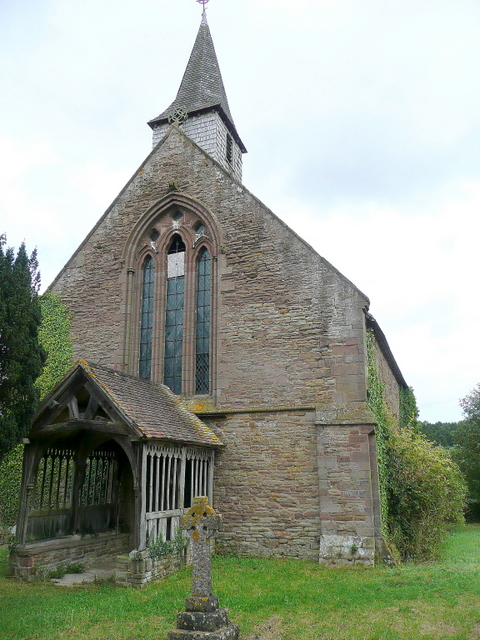
- St John the Baptist's church

- Location within Herefordshire
- Location: Aconbury, Herefordshire, England

History
- Built: Early 13th Century
- Demolished: 1536

Aconbury Priory was a priory in Herefordshire, England. Aconbury is a village on a road between Hereford and Ross-on-Wye.

== History ==
The priory was founded in the early 13th century by Margery de Lacey, the wife of William de Lacey. The existing church, still standing at Aconbury, which was first built in 1230, was attached to the conventual buildings of which little trace exists apart from the upper part of the east and north walls, which were not completely destroyed during the dissolution.

== See also ==
- List of monasteries dissolved by Henry VIII of England
