= Matthew II of Montmorency =

Constable of France (1218–1230)

Seal of Montmorency from before 1214

Seal of Montmorency from after 1214

shield of Montmorency before 1214

shield of Montmorency after 1214

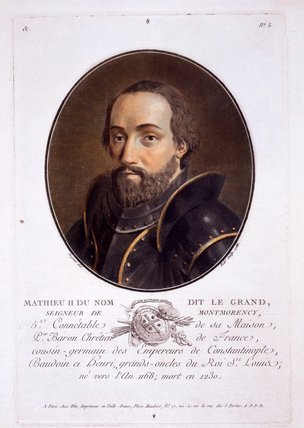
Imaginative gravure of Mathieu II de Montmorency from 1788.

Matthew II or Mathieu II (died 24 November 1230), called the Great or the Great Constable, was lord of Montmorency from 1189 and Constable of France from 1218 to 1230.

Matthew was the son of Bouchard V de Montmorency and Lauretta de Hainaut, daughter of Baldwin IV of Hainault. His father died at the siege of Acre in either 1189 or 1190

Matthew replaced the fallen Albéric Clément as Marshal of France at the siege of Acre during the Third Crusade. After his safe return from the Holy Land, he participated in the French conquest of Normandy by Philip Augustus, where he distinguished himself during the siege of Château Gaillard in 1204. He played a vital role in the Battle of Bouvines in 1214, where he captured twelve enemy banners (in memory of this feat, the shield of Montmorency includes an additional twelve eagles or sixteen altogether instead of four previously).

In 1215, Matthew joined the Albigensian Crusade, as Constable of France. In the service of King Louis VIII of France, he conquered La Rochelle and several other cities from the English in 1224. When the Louis VIII died in 1226, he protected the interests of the infant prince and the Queen-Regent Blanche of Castile.

Matthew died in 1230, returning from a campaign against Anjou.

== Marriage and Children ==
Matthieu II married in 1193 with Gertrude of Soissons, daughter of Ralph, Count of Soissons. They had:

- Gertrude (died 1256), married Simon III de Parroye and later Thierry le Diable, son of Frederick I, Duke of Lorraine
- Bouchard VI de Montmorency (died 1243), succeeded his father as Lord of Montmorency
- Matthias (died February 1250 in the Battle of Al Mansurah, Egypt), married Marie, Countess of Ponthieu
- Jean, Lord of Roissy (1226–36)

After this marriage was annulled, Matthieu II remarried with Emma of Laval (1200–1264), daughter and heiress of late Guy V de Laval. They had:

- Guy VII de Laval (1219–1265), succeeded his mother as Lord of Laval
- Avoise, married Jacques de Château-Gontier
- Johanna
- Alix ?, married to Roger lord of Rozoy (also killed at Al Mansurah)

== Sources ==
- Baldwin, John W. (2019). Knights, Lords, and Ladies: In Search of Aristocrats in the Paris Region, 1180-1220. University of Pennsylvania Press.
- Barthélemy, Dominique (1984). Les deux âges de la seigneurie banale: Pouvoir et Societe dans la Terre des Sires de Coucy (milieu XI- milieu XIII Siecle) (in French). Publications de la Sorbonne.
- Bennett, Stephen (2021). Elite Participation in the Third Crusade. The Boydell Press.
- Gilbert of Mons (2005). Chronicle of Hainaut. Translated by Napran, Laura. The Boydell Press.
- Gousset, Jean-Michel; Chollet, Samuel (2006). "Mayenne. Laval, datation dendrochronologique des hourds du donjon". Bulletin Monumental (in French). 164–2 (2): 202–203. doi:10.3406/bulmo.2006.1356.
- Painter, Sidney (2019). The Scourge of the Clergy: Peter of Dreux, Duke of Brittany. Johns Hopkins University Press.
- Walsby, Malcolm (2007). The Counts of Laval: Culture, Patronage and Religion in Fifteenth- and Sixteenth-Century France. Ashgate Publishing.
