= Maurice II de Craon =

12th-century Anglo-Norman Lord and Crusader

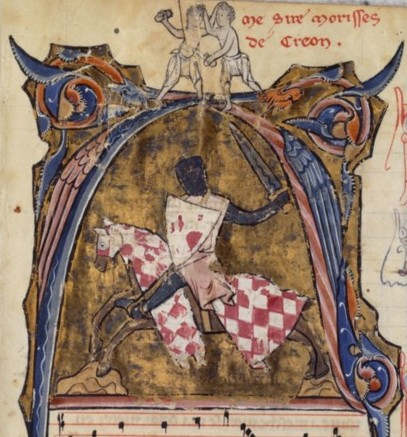
- An illustration from a chansonnier
- Born: c. 1132; Craon, Mayenne
- Died: 1196
- Spouse: Isabelle de Meulan
- Military career
- Allegiance: Plantagenet
- Conflicts: Revolt of 1173–74; Third Crusade

Maurice II de Craon (c. 1132–1196) was Lord of Craon, Governor of Anjou and Maine under Henry II, a military figure and Anglo-Norman of the 12th century. Maurice II also possessed fiefs in England which he held courtesy of Henry II.

== Biography ==
=== The Lord of Craon ===
Maurice II, took possession of the seigneury of Craon on the death of his brother Guérin, when Henry II Plantagenet, born in Le Mans in 1133, became Count of Anjou in 1151. Maurice was still a minor at the time, but in 1158, he took part in the siege of the town of Thouars, and then took a number of deeds in favour of the Abbey of La Roë. Maurice Il's taking possession of the seigneury of Craon came after a long period of minority which had lasted two decades due to the premature death of his father and the death of his heirs. This situation, common at the time is a factor to be taken into account when analysing their stance.positions. Indeed, the long period of minority does not allow us to the family's attitude at a time when the lords of Anjou were lords of Anjou were relatively agitated.

=== Knighthood ===
Maurice II, son of Hugues I de Craon and of Marquise, his second wife, succeeded his brother around 1150. Still a minor, he received his knighthood on acceptance of the fief. Maurice II's earliest military action was his participation in the siege staged by Henry II of the city of Thouars, which was taken 10 October 1158.

=== Crusade ===
Ecu losangé d'or et de gueules

A few years later, Maurice II left for the Crusade. This act, known from the reference in charter 231 of La Roë Abbey of the first court held by him at Poiltrée at Christmas time, after his return from Jerusalem, is furthermore attested by ten items of the Cartulaire de Craon. Maurice II thus returned to France after the month of March 1170.

He took several risks whilst in the Orient and, in executing an oath made abroad, in Egypto, he established an annuity of two sous for the benefit of the Collégiale Saint-Nicolas de Craon to contribute towards the chapel lamp.

=== Marriage ===
He married Isabelle de Meulan, daughter of Galéran IV de Meulan, widow from her first marriage to Geoffroy III de Mayenne on his return from the Holy Land about 1170 This alliance brought him the double support of the lords of Meulan and those of Mayenne.

From his marriage, contracted around 1170 with Isabelle de Mayenne, Maurice II had four sons and three daughters :

- Renaud;
- Maurice III;
- Pierre ecclesiastic;
- Amaury;
- Avoise, wife of Guy V de Laval;
- Clémence, wife of Pierre de la Garnache;
- Agnès, wife of Thibault II de Mathefelon.

=== Henry II of England ===
The time of Maurice II saw the rise of the house of Anjou. From 1152 the Lords of Anjou became vassals of Henry II of England, and, under his standard, obliged to combat France.

In 1174, following the revolt of the sons of Henry II against their father, Maurice II counted amongst the lords that had remained faithful to the King. Charged with leading the Angevins, he seized Chantoceaux and Sablé, destroyed Sablé's two neighbouring fortresses; Saint-Loup and Saint-Brice, and took over the government of Anjou and of Maine, as well as that of the recently constructed fortress at Ancenis.

The same year he figured amongst the witnesses of the Treaty of Falaise establishing peace between Henry II and his sons.

In 1177, following the agreement made between Louis VII and Henri II, he was predesignated as one of the arbitrators who would rule in the event of difficulties.

He was similarly nominated the 28 June 1180 for the peace signed at Gisors between Philippe-Auguste and Henri II.

=== Third Crusade ===
Richard the Lionheart, successor to Henry II, took with him a great number of his vassals but others were not going to join him until later; Maurice II was amongst these, for, in 1191, he was still in Anjou. We find no acts emanating from him at the time of the departure for his first voyage to the Holy Land. For the second, however, many are known. including a testament dated 1191.

=== Testament ===
The testament portrays the state of the family of Maurice II in 1191. He identifies six children: three daughters, the eldest, and three sons. The eldest daughter Avoise de Craon, married Guy V de Laval; the second is not named, but Pierre de la Garnache, who held the rank there is evidently her husband. The third, Agnès, is named, her dowry of Craon and Chantocé is specified, but the name of her husband is not given; as for the sons all three figure in their order of primogeniture.

=== Death ===
Maurice II returned to France and founded the priory of Bonshommes de Ballots near to Craon. He died 12 July 1196, resulting in the obituary of la Haye-aux-Bons-Hommes. The location of his tomb is not known, but it is known that his heart was taken to Savigny Abbey.

== Anglo-Norman Poet ==
Maurice II was not only a great warrior and a man of faith; he was also a poet and amongst the songs of the trouvères of the Langue d'oïl, which have descended to us, there is one that one can legitimately be considered as being as his work that which begins by the verse:

A l'entrant del doux termine.

== Literature ==
Maurice II de Craon is the central character of the anonymous Middle High German verse romance Moriz von Craûn dated between 1187 and 1250. This, in turn, derives from a French fabliau: Du chevalier qui recovra l'amour de sa dame. The story tells of Maurice's attempts to woo "Isabel", depicted as the wife of his neighbour, Richard de Beaumont.

== Cartulaire de Craon ==
Cartulaire de Craon (1150–1196)
1. 121. 1150–1158. Notice of agreements made between la Roë and the forestarii which relate the series of Lords of Craon; Renaud and his sons Maurice, Henri and Robert then Hugues, Guérin, and Maurice and the abbots Quintinus, Herveus, Robertns, Albinus, Giraldus, Menardus and Michel the seventh (La Roë, No.17).
2. 122. 1150–1158. Agreement between Michel, abbot of La Roë, and Mathieu de Nouestrel, made before Maurice II (p.441 of the copy of Paul Marchegay du Cartulaire de La Roë).
3. 123. 1150–1158. Notice of gift made to La Roë by Suhart de la Roë and his father Hugues. Maurice II witness (La Roë, No.233).
4. 124. 1150–1158. Notice of a gift made to La Roë by André le Forestier, with the approval of Maurice II (La Roë, No.235)
5. 125. 1150–1158. Notice of the agreement between La Roë and Saint-Nicolas de Craon on the subject of the terre de Roseto. Maurice II approved this (La Roë, No.42).
6. 126. 1150–1158. Notice of the restitution made at La Roë by Maurice II and Guillaume de la Guerche, his uncle, of the right of measure of grain (La Roë, No.12).
7. 127. 1156. Guillaume de la Guerche made a gift to the Priory Saint-Nicolas de la Guerche. Maurice II witness (Dom Morice, Preuves, I, 624).
8. 128. 1158. Notice of the vain attempt by Maurice II on his return from the siege of Thouars to exact a contribution from La Roë for the taxes that were owed him (La Roë, No.185).
9. 129. 1156–1162. Charter of Maurice II, recognising the harm rendered by his demands of La Roë (facsimile in Procès-verbaux et documents de la Commission historique de la Mayenne, vol. IV, p. 328).
10. 130. 1150–1170. Notice of a gift that Maurice II, on the authority of Marquise, his mother, and of Guillaume de la Guerche, his uncle, made at La Roë of the fief of Robert Chochebelle (La Roë, No.128).
11. 131. 1150–1170. Notice of a gift of the pasture of Fontenelle made at La Roë by Maurice II. Robert, Maurice II's brother, witness (La Roë, No.163).
12. 132. 1150–1170. Notice of the exchange of the mill of Barillé for that of Ville-Courtoise. Maurice II witness (La Roë, No.184).
13. 133. 1150–1170. Notice of an exchange between the Abbot Michel and Allemand, the year Maurice II was knighted (La Roë, charter 72).
14. 134. 1162, Maurice II, at the request of Marquise, his mother, of Geoffroy de Pouancé, his nephew, and of Payen de Vaiges, husband of Marquise, made a gift to Saint-Melaine (Dom Lobineau, II, 218).
15. 135. 1163. Pierre de Lohéac made a gift to the Abbey of Montfort. Maurice II witness (Dom Morice, Preuves, I, 648).
16. 136. 1165, 23 June. Sentence of Etienne de Marsay against Hamelin d'Anthenaise relating to the rights of a wine press at Bouère. Maurice II was one of the judges (Notice sur la maison d'Anthenaise, 1878, p. 102, and Archives de la Sarthe, No.307 of Bilard).
17. 137. 1169, v. s., 20 March, Jerusalem. Authenticity of relics given to Maurice II by Amaury, patriarch of Jerusalem, (Dom Rousseau, No.1876).
18. 138. 1169. Authenticity of relics given to Maurice II by Philippe de Milly, grand master of the temple (Cartulaire des Bons-Hommes).
19. 139. 1169. Authenticity of relics given to Maurice II by Rainauld, abbot of Mount Sion (Dom Housseau, No.1866).
20. 140. 1169. Authenticity of the relics given by Renaud, Bishop of Hebron (Dom Housseau, No.1869)
21. 141. 1169. Authenticity of the relics given by the Bishop of Bethlehem (Dom Housseau, No.1870).
22. 142. 1169. Authenticity of the relics given by the bishops of Sebastia. (Dom Housseau, No.1871).
23. 143. 1169. Authenticity of the relics given by the abbot of Temple (Dom Housseau No.1872).
24. 144. 1169. Authenticity of the relics given by the abbess of Notre Dame la Grande of Jerusalem (Dom Housseau, No.1873).
25. 145. 1169. Authenticity of the relics given by Amaury, King of Jerusalem (Dom Housseau, No.1874).
26. 146. 1169. Authenticity of the relics given by the Master of Saint-Lazare of Jerusalem (Dom Housseau, No.1875).
27. 147. 1170, 25 December, Poiltré. Notice of a gift to La Roë by Renaud, son of Geoffroy de Uriaco, ratified at Christmas at the first court held by Maurice II on his return from Jerusalem (Charter 231 of La Roë).
28. 148. 1172. Agreement between Robert IV de Sablé and the Chapter of Tours on the subject of rights on Précigné (Dom Housseau, No.1886).
29. 149. 1174, Falaise. Peace between Henry II of England and his sons – Maurice II witness (Rymer, 1174, p. 12).
30. 150. 1174. Charter of Henry II of England granting privilege to Notre-Dame de Saintes after the ransack of the town; Maurice II witness (Charter 83 of Cartulaire de N.-D. de Saintes, edited in 1871 by Abbot Grasilier).
31. 151. About 1175. Charter of Henry II of England regulating the tariff of tolls at Ponts-de-Cés; Maurice II witness (Paul Marchegay, Archives d'Anjou, vol. II, p. 255).
32. 152. About 1175, at Valognes. – Charter of Henry II of England confirming the agreement made between Robert de Torigni and Guillaume du Hommet; Maurice II witness (Chronique de Robert de Torigni, vol. II, p. 307).
33. 153. 1165–1189. Agreement made in the court of senechal Etienne following a challenge between Saint-Aubin and Bernard Chales; Maurice II witness (Archives de la Sarthe, No.237 by Bilard).
34. 154. 1170–1184. Charter of Geoffroy de la Guerche, son of Guillaume and of Damete, brother of Hugues, bearing a gift to La Roë; Maurice II witness (P. 489 of Marchegay's copy of the Cartulaire de la Roë).
35. 155. 1177. – Convention between Louis le Jeune and Henry II of England – Maurice II is one of the referees chosen in advance by Henry II (Rymer, 1177, p. 16).
36. 156. 1180, 28 June, Gisors. Peace between Philippe-Auguste and Henry II of England – Maurice II is one of the referees chosen in advance by Henry II (Rymer, 1180, p. 17).
37. 157. 1180. Charter of Maurice II making a gift to La Roë firstly for Renaud, his son; secondly for Amaury de Meulan (Archives de la Mayenne, H. 175).
38. 158. About 1180. Charter of Roger, son of the Count of Meulan, making a gift at Savigny for Amaury de Meulan; Maurice II, Isabelle, Juhel III witnesses (Vidimus de mars 1254, v. s., de Richard, Bishop of Avranches, Archives Nat. L 974, No.945)
39. 159. 1181–1183, Le Mans Charter of Henry II of England, making a gift to the hospital founded by him at Angers near to the Fontaine Saint-Laurent; Maurice II witness (Cartulaire de l'Hôtel-Dieu d'Angers, p. 106).
40. 160. 1183. Convention between the abbess of Ronceray, Emma and the sénéchal of Anjou, Etienne, founder of the chaplaincy of Angers; Maurice II witness (Cartulaire de l'Hôtel-Dieu, p. 106).
41. 161. Before November 1183. Charter of Isabelle who, in agreement with her sons, Juhel de Mayenne, Maurice and Pierre de Craon, made a gift to Savigny. The seal of Maurice II is affixed to the charter (Original scellé, Arch. Nat., L. 974, No.936).
42. 162. About 1184. Charter of Robert de Meulan ratifying a donation of 10 pounds rent on Pont-Audemer, made to Savigny by Isabelle, his sister, in agreement with Juhel de Mayenne, Maurice and Pierre de Craon; Maurice II de Craon witness (Arch. Nat., L. 974, No.929).
43. 163. About 1184. Charter de Henry II of England ratifying the gift of Isabelle de Meulan to Savigny; Maurice II witness (Original, Arch. Nat., L. 974, No.937).
44. 164. 1180–1190. Charter of Maurice II, in agreement with Isabelle, his wife femme, and Maurice, his son, making a gift to Chaloché; Juhel de Mayenne and Robert de Sablé witnesses (F. Français, No.22450, folio 320).
45. 165. 1184–1190. Charter of André II de Vitré, agreement with his wife Mathilde and his brothers, Alain and Robert, making a gift to Savigny and ratifying that of his father Robert; Maurice II de Craon witness (Original, Arch. Nat., L. 969, Dossier Fayelle).
46. 166. 1184–1190. Charter of André II de Vitré, agreement with his wife Mathilde and his brothers, Alain and Robert, making a gift to Savigny; Maurice II de Craon witness (Original, Arch. Nat., L. 978, No.1362).
47. 167. 1188. Charter of Foulques Riboul founding Champagne Abbey Amaury (read Maurice) de Craon witness (Dom Piolin, IV, 556 and Gallia, vol. XIV, p. 136 of the Instrumenta).
48. 168. About 1188. Charter of Maurice II, granting a gift to Champagne Abbey (Cartulaire de l'abbaye de Champagne).
49. 169. 1189, Chantocé. Charter of Maurice II, in conjunction with Isabelle and sons Maurice and Pierre, making a gift to Boissière Abbey of twenty sous rent for communion wine and of two setiers of wheat to make communion bread (Dom Housseau, No.2028)
50. 170. 1190, November, Messina. – Peace between Richard the Lionheart and Tancred, King of Sicily; Robert de Sablé and Gui de Craon guarantors of the peace (Rymer, 1190, p. 21).
51. 171. 1190. Maurice II adjudicates a dispute between Gautier, Abbot of La Roë, and the Canons of Saint-Nicolas de Craon (Archives de la Mayenne, fonds de la Roë, vol. 164, No.1).
52. 172. 1190. Charter of Isabelle de Mayenne making a gift to Vignats Abbey (Léchaudé d'Anisy, Chartes de Normandie, No.23 of the charters of Vignats).
53. 173. About 1190. Charter of Robert de Sablé founding Perray Abbey; Maurice II witness (Gallia Christiana, vol. XIV, p. 158 of the Instrumenta).
54. 174. 1190, Mayenne. Charter of Juhel III de Mayenne, the year of his departure for Jerusalem, ratifying all the possessions of Savigny in his fief; Maurice II de Craon and Isabelle, mother of Juhel, witnesses (Original, L. 972, dossier Mayenne).
55. 175. About 1190. Charter of Savary d'Anthenaise making a gift to Savigny approved by his wife Cécile; Maurice II, Robert de Sablé and Geoffroy de Sablé witnesses. (Cartulaire de Savigny, n° XCIII of the charters of the bishopric of Mans).
56. 176. About 1191. Testament of Maurice II (Chroniques Craonnnaises, p. 596, and Beautemps-Beaupré, Institutions et coutumes de l'Anjou et du Maine, vol. III, p. CIII).
57. 177. 1191, 23 June, Angers. Charter of Maurice II making a gift to La Roë (Archives de la Mayenne, H. 194, f. 6).
58. 178. 1191, Tours. Notice of gifts made to Saint-Nicolas de Craon by Renaud and by Maurice Il (Dom Housseau, No.2065).
59. 179. 1191. Maurice II, with the approval of his wife Isabelle and of their son Maurice, gave to Angers hospital a rent of thirty sous to take from the toll of the Loire at Chantocé, and gave free passage to the barge getting salt from Nantes (Cartulaire de l'Hôtel-Dieu d'Angers, p. 127).
60. 180. 1195–1196, Nantes. Charter of Constance de Bretagne, Duchess of Brittany, making a gift to the hospital of Saint-Jean d'Angers; Maurice II witness (Cartulaire de l'Hôtel-Dieu d'Angers, p. 112).
61. 181. 1196, before the 10 August. Charter of Maurice II in favour of the Bons-Hommes (Cartulaire des Bons-Hommes, folio 176).

== See also ==
- Craon family
