= Hugh XIII of Lusignan =

French count

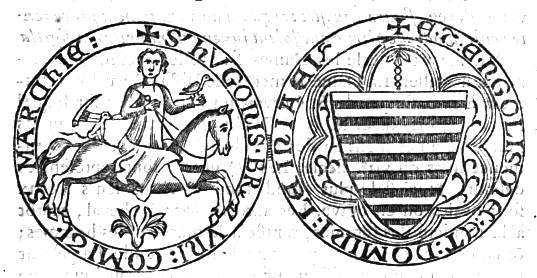
Seal of Hugh XIII de Lusignan used in 1281. He is shown in hunting dress, with a small terrier-like hunting dog behind the croup of his saddle, with hunting horn hanging from his neck. This was the usual depiction in the seals of his ancestors and may indicate an early feudal tenure by grand serjeanty of hunting, as the same device was used by the Turberville family of Coity Castle in Glamorgan

Hugh XIII of Lusignan, Hugh VIII of La Marche or Hugh IV of Angoulême (25 June 1259 – 1 November 1303) succeeded his father Hugh XII as Seigneur de Lusignan, Count of La Marche and Count of Angoulême in 1270.

He married at Pau on 1 July 1276 Beatrice of Burgundy, Dame de Grignon (c. 1260 – Cognac, June 1328/31 May 1329 and buried at Angoulême), daughter of Hugh IV, Duke of Burgundy and second wife Beatrice of Champagne. They had no issue.
