= William des Roches =

William des Roches (died 1222) (in French Guillaume des Roches) was a French knight and crusader who acted as Seneschal of Anjou, of Maine and of Touraine. After serving the Angevin kings of England, in 1202 he changed his loyalty to King Philip II of France and became a leading member of his government.

== Origins ==
Born about 1160, his origins are unknown but he is taken to be from the same family of knightly status in or near Château-du-Loir that produced his contemporary Peter des Roches, the Bishop of Winchester.

== Early career ==
William des Roches early in his life had been a mesnie knight of King Henry II of England. During the rebellion of 1189, Richard of Poitou (later Richard I of England) and King Philip II of France attacked the ageing king of England in the city of his birth, Le Mans. Guillaume had participated in the defense of Le Mans in the company of such knights as William Marshal and Gerard Talbot and was with King Henry when he was forced to flee the city. According to "The History of William the Marshal", des Roches rode in the vanguard of the retreating royal force. He wheeled around with William Marshal and engaged Count Richard's vanguard where he successfully charged and knocked Philip de Colombiers off of his horse.

After the death of King Henry, Guillaume enrolled in the royal mesnie of Richard, now King of England, Duke of Normandy and Aquitaine and Count of Anjou. William was a trusted confidant of King Richard, and during the Third Crusade he was involved in the conquest of Sicily, the Siege of Acre, the Battle of Arsuf, and the Battle of Jaffa. In 1192, he was sent with Pierre de Preaux and Gerard de Fournival as part of a deputation to obtain safe conducts for the crusading host to enter Jerusalem and its environs. William remained a steadfast adherent to Richard in his wars with King Philip of France from 1194–1199 and it may have been at this time that he was arranged to be married to Marguerite, the daughter and heiress of Robert de Sablé.

== Angevin war of succession (1199–1204) ==
=== Breton service ===
At the death of Richard at Chalus in April 1199, the Angevin kingship faced a serious succession dispute between Prince John of England, brother of King Richard, and Arthur of Brittany, Richard's nephew. The leaders of England, Normandy, and Poitou sided with John, while the barons of Anjou and Brittany chose Arthur according to their customs of succession. William, then at Le Mans, threw in his support for Arthur along with a very powerful group of Manceaux and Angevin barons, including Juhel II of Mayenne and his mother Isabella of Meulan. Des Roches became Arthur's seneschal of Anjou and was entrusted with the defense of Le Mans. The city of Tours was surrendered to Arthur and Eleanor, duchess of Aquitaine and queen-mother of England. In addition, she was Arthur's grandmother. She sent a force under Viscount Aimery VII of Thouars, John's newly appointed seneschal of Anjou (replacing Robert of Turnham), Hugh IX of Lusignan, and his brother Raoul I of Exoudun, count of Eu. Eleanor's force was successful in entering the suburbs of Tours, but was driven back by King Philip II of France who had himself chosen Arthur as Richard's rightful successor.

In May 1199, King Philip of France met with William des Roches at Le Mans and together they attacked the border fortress of Ballon, the fortress was surrendered by Geoffrey de Brûlon, the castellan, but not before being demolished. A quarrel ensued between King Philip and William over the lordship of the site. William was adamant that Ballon belonged rightfully to Duke Arthur, while King Philip wished to retain it as his own.

=== English service ===
In June 1199, King John of England launched a massive attack into Northern Maine from Argentan. On 13 September he was successful in repulsing King Philip from the fortress of Lavardin which protected the route from Le Mans to Tours. Arthur's supporters were forced to come to terms with John, and William met with the English king at Bourg-le-Roi, a fortress of the pro-John viscounts of Beaumont-en-Maine on or about 18 September. John convinced William that Arthur of Brittany was being used solely as tool of Capetian strategy and managed to convince him to switch sides. With this, John promised him the seneschalship of Anjou. During the night, John's incumbent seneschal, Viscount Aimery, took Arthur and Constance and fled the court. They fled first to Angers, then to the court of King Philip. King John officially designated William seneschal of Anjou in December 1199 and entered Angers triumphantly on 24 June 1200.

During the summer of 1201, William married Marguerite de Sablé. With this marriage came a vast landholding that included Sablé, La Suze, Briollay, Maiet, Loupelandé, Genneteil, Precigné, and the Norman manor of Agon (which was held of the lord of Mayenne). William had become overnight one of the greatest barons of Anjou and Maine and relative-in-law to the most exclusive houses of the region.

Coinciding with a renewed French attack on upper Normandy, Arthur along with many prominent knights of France and Poitou attempted to capture Eleanor of Aquitaine as she traveled from Anjou to her chief seat at Poitiers. Taking refuge in the castle of Mirebeau on the road just north of Poitiers, she came under siege. William agreed to help John with the relief of the castle as long as any prisoners captured were treated within common custom. He led a large contingent of Angevin knights along with Aimery of Thouars (now returned to favor with John by the diplomacy of Eleanor of Aquitaine) in John's company, and they arrived outside the castle on the night of 31 July 1202. The Battle of Mirebeau, fought the following day, was a decisive victory for King John in which Duke Arthur of Brittany was captured. Many of the prisoners captured, important Poitevins and Bretons, were grossly mistreated and some, including royal relatives like the viscount Hugh of Châtellerault and André de Chauvigny, were starved to death. Arthur himself disappeared in John's Norman prisons and many, including the French king, came to the conclusion that Arthur was in fact murdered by his uncle, King John.

=== French service ===
William immediately left John's service (between 17 and 25 August 1202) and departed to the court of Juhel de Mayenne. John sent soldiers to secure Angers and Tours and revoked William's seneschalship. King John then split the office and gave the seneschalship of Anjou to Brice the Chamberlain, a mercenary in his pay. The seneschalship of Tours was given to another mercenary captain, Martin Algais. Des Roches launched an attack on Angers and captured the city on 30 October 1202. Simultaneously, Sulpice III d'Amboise captured the town, but not the citadel at Tours. In January 1203, John mustered an army at Argentan for the reconquest of his Loire provinces. John took up court in Alençon and then Le Mans while his army was mustering. While in Le Mans he learned of the treachery of the count of Sees who had usurped authority in the town of Alençon (a town that belonged to his grandfather, Count William Talvas, up to 1166). Along with Count Robert of Sees rebelled Viscount Ralph of Beaumont. With two great barons of northern Maine now in the French camp, John's chances of retaining even Maine were reduced significantly. John, avoiding fortresses belonging to rebels, slowly made his way back to his army at Argentan. Alençon was offered to King Philip of France by the rebellious count in return for Philip's recognition of his comital authority over the area and possession of the family's castle at La Roche-Mabile.

While the barons of northern Maine kept John busy, William and a league of barons from the region including Maurice III of Craon, Thibaud V of Blaison, Bernard III of La Ferte, and Juhel II of Mayenne traveled to Paris and offered their homage and fealty to King Philip of France. With this, King Philip launched his forces into Anjou to attack strongholds that still held out for John. Saumur was captured in April 1203 and Beaufort-en-Vallée and Châteauneuf-sur-Sarthe fell soon thereafter. William, and his forces launched an attack on Le Mans and captured the city by about 17 May. One of John's final acts of 1203 was to bring Alençon under siege in August, he was unsuccessful in capturing the castle, and with many of his Norman castles under siege or already captured (including Vaudreuil), he must have known that the end of Angevin rule north of the Loire was upon him.

== King Philip triumphant ==
William's family had originated from the lesser aristocracy, knights from Chateau-du-Loir, a castle that was granted as a dowry property of King Richard's widow, Berengaria of Navarre. Guillaume arranged for the exchange of his lordship of Le Mans (split with the bishop and the hereditary Manceaux seneschals, the 'Mauchien' family) for Berengaria's castle which he then became lord of. The exchange was ratified by King Philip.

King Philip had conquered Normandy (receiving the surrender of Peter de Preaux at Rouen in April 1204. Philip had then marched through Anjou and entered Poitiers after the death of Duchess Eleanor on 1 April. It was in Poitiers that Philip officially granted the hereditary seneschalship on to William. By a later charter (1206) William received custody of Angers, Loudun, Saumur, Brissac, Beaufort, and "all the land of Anjou" at the King's pleasure. The lasting settlement arranged in 1208 had King Philip retain authority in Touraine with the castles of Chinon, Bourgueil, Loudun, Saumur, and Langeais. William was granted custody of all of Anjou and Maine including the fortresses of Bauge and Chateauneuf-sur-Sarthe. In addition, William was granted the "third penny" of justice in Anjou and one mark of silver per fifty livres of demesnial revenue. He was also permitted to assign baillis to assist him, Hamelin de Roorta being the most prominent. Coincidentally, Aimery of Thouars was conferred the seneschalship of Poitou by King Philip to similar terms with exception to the added revenue. King John's senechal of Poitou for 1205 had been Savaric of Mauleon, who was limited to the Aunis coastline and later in the year the castle of Niort.

Des Roches and Dreux of Mello, constable of France conducted the attack in Touraine culminating with capture of John's last Angevin fortresses, Chinon and Loches. Hubert de Burgh, John's castellan of both locations was forced to surrender in June 1205.

In 1206, John restabilized his rule in Poitou, Guienne, and Gascony, driving Castilian forces from Bourg, Bayonne, and Dax. Leading barons of Poitou preferred the absentee rule of King John to the more autocratic rule of King Philip; the Thouars, Mauleon, Lusignan, Parthenay, and Sugeres families all allied with King John. William set out with a force of knights to defend the Roman road connecting Tours and Poitiers. Other than a brief occupation of Angers, John was unsuccessful in making further progress north of the Loire. John departed after signing a two-year truce with King Philip that recognized the status quo. As soon as the truce was up in 1208, William and Dreux de Mello (based at Loches) collected some 300 knights and launched numerous attacks on Thouars holdings in Poitou.

== Albigensian Crusade and later life ==
William took the cross in 1209 and left Anjou to crusade in the Toulousain and Languedoc with Eudes III of Burgundy against the Cathar heretics. He was active at the siege of Béziers in July and Carcassonne in August. He wouldn't again participate in the Albigensian Crusade until 1219 at the Siege of Marmande under Prince Louis (later Louis VIII of France, the eldest son and heir of King Philip II of France.

King John again attacked Anjou from the south during the Bouvines Campaign of 1214. John was repulsed from Nantes but was able to enter Angers on 17 June. John moved out of the city to reduce the local forts, two succumbed quickly, but the garrison of the new fort at La Roche-aux-Moines, located just south of Angers, held out. An army of 800 knights under the command of the seneschal, Prince Louis, Amauri I de Craon, and Henri Clement, marshal of France collected at Chinon. John was deserted by his Thouars and Lusignan allies upon hearing of the collection of so great a force. On 2 July 1214, William and Prince Louis were victorious at the Battle of La Roche-aux-Moines and forced John to retreat clear to La Rochelle.

The seneschal died in 1222 and his eldest daughter, Jeanne brought the Sable barony and the hereditary seneschalship to her husband, Amauri de Craon.

== See also ==
- List of Counts and Dukes of Anjou
- Angevin Empire
- Anjou
