= Robert IV of Sablé =

Grand Master of the Knights Templar from 1191 to 1192

Robert IV de Sablé
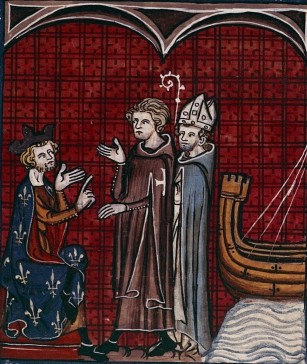
- Robert de Sablé and the Patriarch of Jerusalem meet with King Philip II Augustus of France. Miniature from the Chronicles of Saint-Denis, 14th century.

11th Grand Master of the Knights Templar
- In office 1191–1193
- Preceded by: Gérard de Ridefort
- Succeeded by: Gilbert Horal

English Counselor
- In office 1190–1193
- Monarch: Richard I of England

Personal details
- Born: 1150 Sablé, Anjou, France
- Died: 23 September 1193 (aged 42–43) Arsuf, Kingdom of Jerusalem
- Cause of death: Killed in action
- Spouse: Clemence de Mayenne
- Children: Geoffroy de Cornillé; Marguerite de Sablé; Philippa de Sablé
- Parents: Robert III de Sablé; Hersende d'Anthenaise de Chaouches y de Malicorne

Military service
- Allegiance: Kingdom of England; Knights Templar
- Battles/wars: Revolt of 1173–1174; Third Crusade; Siege of Acre; Battle of Arsuf

Robert IV de Sablé (or de Sabloil; 1150 − 23 September 1193) was Lord of Sablé, the eleventh Grand Master of the Knights Templar from 1191 to 1192 and Lord of Cyprus from 1191 to 1192. He was known as the Grand Master of the Knights Templars and the Grand Master of the Holy and Valiant Order of Knights Templars.

== Personal life ==
Sablé was born to a respected military family in Anjou and was "a leading Angevin vassal of the King". His lordship was based in a cluster of lands in the River Sarthe valley, which he inherited in the 1160s. He married Clemence de Mayenne (died before 1209). He was succeeded in Anjou by his daughter Marguerite de Sablé, who by marriage passed the entire estate to William des Roches, also a knight of the Third Crusade. Robert died in the Holy Land on 23 September 1193. Although there are no exact records of his birth date, it is believed that he was relatively old at the time of his death compared to the average life expectancy of the 12th century.

== Military record ==
=== Angevin Civil War ===
In 1173, Sablé supported Henry the Young King, heir apparent to the throne of the Kingdom of England and duchy of Normandy, in a revolt against his father Henry II during the Revolt of 1173-1174. The uprising was crushed, but Robert is believed to have remained in favour with the Angevin Kings, as Richard I would later be instrumental in his appointment as Grand Master. He contributed money to French monastic houses in 1190 as a way of making amends.

=== Third Crusade ===
According to the Itinerarium Regis Ricardi, Robert was one of the chosen leaders of the Crusading Fleet of Richard I that departed from Dartmouth in the spring of 1190. The fleet scattered in the sea of Bisquay a result of a storm and arrived at different times to the Portuguese port of Lisbon. One of these groups was involved in helping the Portuguese monarch Sancho I repel an Almohad attack against the city of Santarem, while another went on a rampage against the local Jews and Muslims in the Christian controlled city of Lisbon. Robert arrived as the Portuguese monarch captured the misbehaved crusaders and was forced to swear an oath to control his forces while in Portuguese territory.

Despite only having a short tenure, Sablé's reign was filled with successful campaigning. Before his election as Grand Master, he led King Richard I's navy from England and Normandy to the Mediterranean, getting involved in the Reconquista in the passage. The combined might of Richard the Lionheart's strategy, seasoned troops, and the elite Templar knights scored many victories. During the Third Crusade, they laid siege to the city of Acre, which soon fell. Throughout August 1191, they also recaptured many fortresses and cities along the Levantine coast in the Eastern Mediterranean, which had been lost previously.

The new coalition's biggest success was the Battle of Arsuf, on 7 September 1191. Saladin's Muslim forces appeared to have become far stronger than the Christians, and a decisive victory was desperately needed. Pooling all of the crusaders' strength, the Knights Hospitaller joined the ranks, plus many knights from Sablé's native Anjou, Maine, and Brittany. They met Saladin's troops on the dry plains and soon broke his ranks. Those who stayed to fight were killed, and the remaining Islamic troops were forced to retreat.

== Acquisition of Cyprus ==
At the end of 1191, Richard the Lionheart agreed to sell Cyprus to the Templars for 25,000 pieces of silver. Richard had plundered the island from the Byzantine forces of the tyrant Isaac Comnenus of Cyprus some months earlier and had no real use for it. The Hospitallers would later establish solid bases on the islands of Rhodes and Malta, but Sablé failed to do the same with the island of Cyprus. He was lord for two years, until he gave (or sold) the island to Guy de Lusignan, King of Jerusalem, as he was without a kingdom.

Sablé did manage to establish a Chieftain House of the Order in Saint-Jean d'Acre, which remained for almost a century.

== Delayed election ==
At the time of Gerard de Ridefort's death, Sablé was not even a member of the Templar Order. However, the senior knights had become increasingly opposed to Masters fighting on the front line, and the capture and beheading of Grand Master Gerard de Ridefort became the final straw. They delayed elections for over a year so that the rules regarding active service of Grand Masters could be reviewed. During this hiatus, Sablé did join the order, just in time to be considered for election. When he was made Grand Master, he had been a Templar knight for less than a year. He died in 1193.

== In popular culture ==
Robert de Sablé is the secondary antagonist in the 2007 video game Assassin's Creed. He is the leader of the Knights Templar, who are depicted as acting behind the scenes on both sides of the holy war to further their own ideological goals and obtain a "Piece of Eden". Al Mualim, the leader of the Assassins (and the game's main antagonist), orders Altaïr Ibn-La'Ahad to assassinate Robert after eliminating his eight co-conspirators, which is depicted as taking place in 1191 at the Battle of Arsuf. Maria Thorpe, his stewardess, later becomes Altaïr's wife.

== Bibliography ==
- Power, Daniel (2004). The Norman Frontier in the Twelfth and Early Thirteenth Centuries. Cambridge University Press.
- Whyte, Jack (24 January 2008) [18 October 2002]. Standard of Honor. The Templar Trilogy. Vol. 2. Penguin Publisher. p. 800. ISBN 9781101215296.
- Villegas-Aristizabal, Lucas (2009). "Revisión de las crónicas de Ralph de Diceto y la Gesta regis Ricardi sobre la participación de la flota angevina durante la tercera cruzada en Portugal". Studia historica. Historia medieval (in Spanish). 27: 153–170. ISSN 0213-2060.
- Robert-De-Sable 161, the name lives on in the form of a Knights Templar preceptory in the United Kingdom of Great Britain. Freemasonry being the continuation of the original order. See sworn in secret for further reading.

Religious titles
Preceded by Gerard de Ridefort	Grand Master of the Knights Templar; 1191–1193	Succeeded by Gilbert Horal
