= County of La Marche =

Medieval French county

La Marche
- Flag Coat of arms
- Interactive map of La Marche
- Country: France
- Time zone: CET

Map of France in 1154, showing location of County of La Marche

The County of La Marche (French pronunciation: [maʁʃ]; Occitan: la Marcha) was a medieval French county, approximately corresponding to the modern département of Creuse and the northern half of Haute Vienne.

La Marche first appeared as a separate fief about the middle of the 10th century, when William III, Duke of Aquitaine, gave it to one of his vassals, Boson, who took the title of Count. In the 12th century, the countship passed to the House of Lusignan. They also were sometimes counts of Angoulême and counts of Limousin.

The county owes its name to its position, it having been in the 10th century a march or border district between the duchy of Aquitaine and the domains of the Frankish kings in central France. Originally it was a small district cut partly from Limousin and partly from Poitou. Its area was increased during the 13th century, after which, however, it remained unaltered until the time of the French Revolution.

Map of La Marche with modern departments and communes indicated

With the death of the childless Count Guy in 1308, his possessions in La Marche were seized by Philip IV of France. In 1314, the king made La Marche an appanage for his youngest son the Prince, afterwards Charles IV. Several years later in 1327, La Marche passed into the hands of the House of Bourbon. The family of Armagnac held it from 1435 to 1477, when it reverted to the Bourbons.

In 1527 La Marche was seized by Francis I and became part of the domains of the French crown. It was divided into Haute Marche and Basse Marche, the estates of the former continuing until the 17th century. From 1470 until the Revolution, the province was under the jurisdiction of the parlement of Paris.

== Counts of La Marche ==
=== La Marche dynasty ===
- Boso I le Vieux (the Old), count of La Marche and count of Périgord (958–988)
- Aldebert I, count of La Marche and Périgord (988–997)
  - Boso II, count of La Marche and Périgord (988–1010)
- Bernard I (1010–1041)
  - His daughter, Almodis, married firstly with Hugh V of Lusignan, and their son Hugh VI inherited later the county of Marche by her right.
- Aldebert II (1047–1071), son of Bernard I
  - His daughter, also named Almodis, married before 1086 with Roger the Poitevin, of the House of Montgomery.
- Boso III (1071–1091), son of Aldebert II
  - Eudes I, son of Bernard I, probably ruled as regent for his nephew Boso III (1088)

=== Lusignan dynasty ===
- Hugh I the Devil, son of Hugh V of Lusignan and Almodis de la Marche (1091–1102)
- Hugh II (1102–1151)
- Hugh III (1151–1165)
- Hugh IV the Brown (1203–1219)
- Hugh V (1219–1249)
- Hugh VI (1249–1260)
- Hugh VII (1260–1275)
- Hugh VIII (1270–1303)
- Guy (1303–1308)
- Yolanda (1308–1314)
- Annexed by Philip IV of France and given as an appanage to Philip's son Charles the Fair

=== Capetian dynasty ===
- Charles the Fair (1314–1322)
- On Charles' succession to the throne in 1322, he exchanged the county with Louis of Bourbon for the County of Clermont.

=== Capetian-Bourbon dynasty ===
- Louis I of Bourbon (1322–1341)
- James I of Bourbon (1341–1362)
- Peter II of Bourbon-La Marche (1362)
- John I of Bourbon-La Marche (1362–1393)
- James II (1393–1438), married Joan II of Naples

=== Armagnac dynasty ===
- Bernard, count of Pardiac and of Marche, duke of Nemours (1438–1462) (in right of his wife, Eleanor, daughter of James II)
- Jacques d'Armagnac, 4th Duc de Nemours, count of Pardiac and of Marche, duke of Nemours (1462–1477)
- In 1477, Jacques was convicted of treason and his territories were confiscated by Louis XI of France.

=== Capetian-Bourbon dynasty ===
- Peter II of Bourbon (1477–1503)
- Charles III of Bourbon, count of Montpensier, Beaujeu, Marche, and Forez; duke of Bourbon (1505–1525)

=== Orleanist pretenders to Count of La Marche ===
The title was granted to Thibaut, a younger son of Henri, the Orléanist claimant to the throne of France.

- Prince Thibaut, Count of La Marche (1948–1983)
- Prince Robert, Count of La Marche (b. 1976, r. 1983- )

== See also ==
- Marches
- Provinces of France
