= Taillefer (disambiguation) =

Taillefer is originally an Old French nickname (from the medieval Latin incisor ferri or sector ferri, meaning "hewer of iron"). It may refer to:

- Taillefer, an eleventh-century Norman juggler and singer.
- the Taillefer Rocks, small Tasmanian granite islands
- the Massif du Taillefer in the Dauphiné Alps
- Le Taillefer, highest peak in the Massif du Taillefer
- The House of Taillefer was the first dynasty of Counts of Angoulême (839–1246)
- Taillefer (Strauss), a cantata for choir, soloists and orchestra written by German composer Richard Strauss in 1903

== People with the surname ==
- Germaine Tailleferre born Marcelle Germaine Taillefesse (1892–1983), French composer

== See also ==
- William Taillefer (disambiguation), several medieval rulers had this name
- Telfer (disambiguation), Scottish surname based on Taillefer
- Taliaferro, a Virginian family
