= William Taillefer =

William Taillefer may refer to:

- William Taillefer I (died 962), first to be called William Taillefer
- William II of Angoulême (died 1028), William Taillefer II
- William V of Angoulême (died 1120), William Taillefer III
- William VI of Angoulême (died 1179), William Taillefer IV
- William VII of Angoulême (died 1186), William Taillefer V
- William III, Count of Toulouse (975–1037)

== See also ==
- Taillefer (disambiguation)
