= Robert, Count of Eu =

11th-century noble

Robert, Count of Eu and Lord of Hastings (died between 1089 and 1093) was a Norman nobleman, son of William I, Count of Eu, and his wife Lesceline. He was a member of the House of Normandy and held the titles Count of Eu and Lord of Hastings.

Robert commanded 60 ships in the fleet supporting the landing of William I of England and the Norman conquest of England in 1066. Around 1068, Robert was granted Hastings Castle and the adjacent territories previously held by Onfroy du Tilleul. According to the Domesday Book, Robert and his son William each possessed lands in separate counties. The combined annual income from their lands amounted to about 690 pounds sterling.

In 1069, King William I tasked Robert with supporting Robert, Count of Mortain, in monitoring the Danes, whose fleet was anchored at the mouth of the Humber. Mortain was simultaneously ordered to suppress the revolt initiated by Eadric the Wild in the west. When the Danes left their sanctuary to plunder the surrounding area, the two commanders and their army surprised them, crushing their forces and compelling them to flee by sea.

After the death of King William I, Robert initially supported Robert Curthose, Duke of Normandy. However, reportedly dismayed by Curthose's perceived softness and debauchery, he, along with several other Norman lords, turned towards King William II the Red. From William II, Robert received garrisons for his castles. During the English king's attempted intervention in Normandy in February 1091, Robert was among his supporters. He died after this event, and his son William II succeeded him as count.

Robert married Beatrix de Falaise. They had the following children:

- Raoul d'Eu (died after 1036)
- Robert d'Eu (died 1149), who married Matilda, daughter of Roger I, Count of Sicily and Eremburga of Mortain.
- Condoha (Condor) (died after 1087), who married Fulk d'Angoulême in 1058 and was the mother of William V d'Angoulême and grandmother of Wulgrin II d'Angoulême.
- William II, who succeeded his father as Count of Eu and Lord of Hastings.

Robert was known for his devoutness and made numerous donations to the Church, notably land to Fécamp Abbey of Rouen in 1051. He was buried in the Abbey of Saint-Michel du Tréport, which he had founded in Tréport, near the town of Eu, between 1057 and 1066, reportedly in memory of his first wife. Robert was assisted in this foundation by the council of Duke William and Maurilius, archbishop of Rouen.

Robert was succeeded as Count of Eu and Lord of Hastings by his son William.

== Sources ==
- Barlow, Frank (2000). William Rufus. Yale University Press.
- Callender, Eric (2014). The Monastery of Saint-Michel du Tréport and the Borderlands of Northeast Normandy, 1059-1270 (Masters Thesis). Western Michigan University.
- Cownie, Emma (1998). Religious Patronage in Anglo-Norman England, 1066-1135. The Boydell Press. ISBN 978-0-86193-232-0.
- Crouch, David (2005). The Birth of Nobility: Constructing Aristocracy in England and France, 900-1300. Pearson Education Limited.
- Douglas, David (1946). "The Earliest Norman Counts". The English Historical Review. 61 (240 May). Oxford University Press: 129–156.
- Hagger, Mark (2012). William: King and Conqueror. I.B. Tauris.
- Harper-Bill, Christopher, ed. (2000). Anglo-Norman Studies XXII: Proceedings of the Battle Conference 1999. The Boydell Press.
- Loud, Graham (2013). The Age of Robert Guiscard: Southern Italy and the Northern Conquest. Routledge.
- Power, Daniel (2004). The Norman Frontier in the Twelfth and Early Thirteenth Centuries. Cambridge University Press.
- Van Houts, Elizabeth, ed. (2000). The Normans in Europe. Manchester University Press.
