= Leuthard =

Leuthard may refer to:

- Doris Leuthard (born 1963), president of Switzerland in 2017
- Thomas Leuthard (born 1971), street photographer
- Leuthard I of Paris (d. 813/816), count of Paris and Fezensac
- Leuthard II of Paris (c.806–858/869), seventh Count of Paris
- Leuthari II (fl. c. 643), Duke of Alamannia
- Leutard of Vertus (d. c. 1000), French peasant denounced as a heretic
