= Jarnac =

- Commune
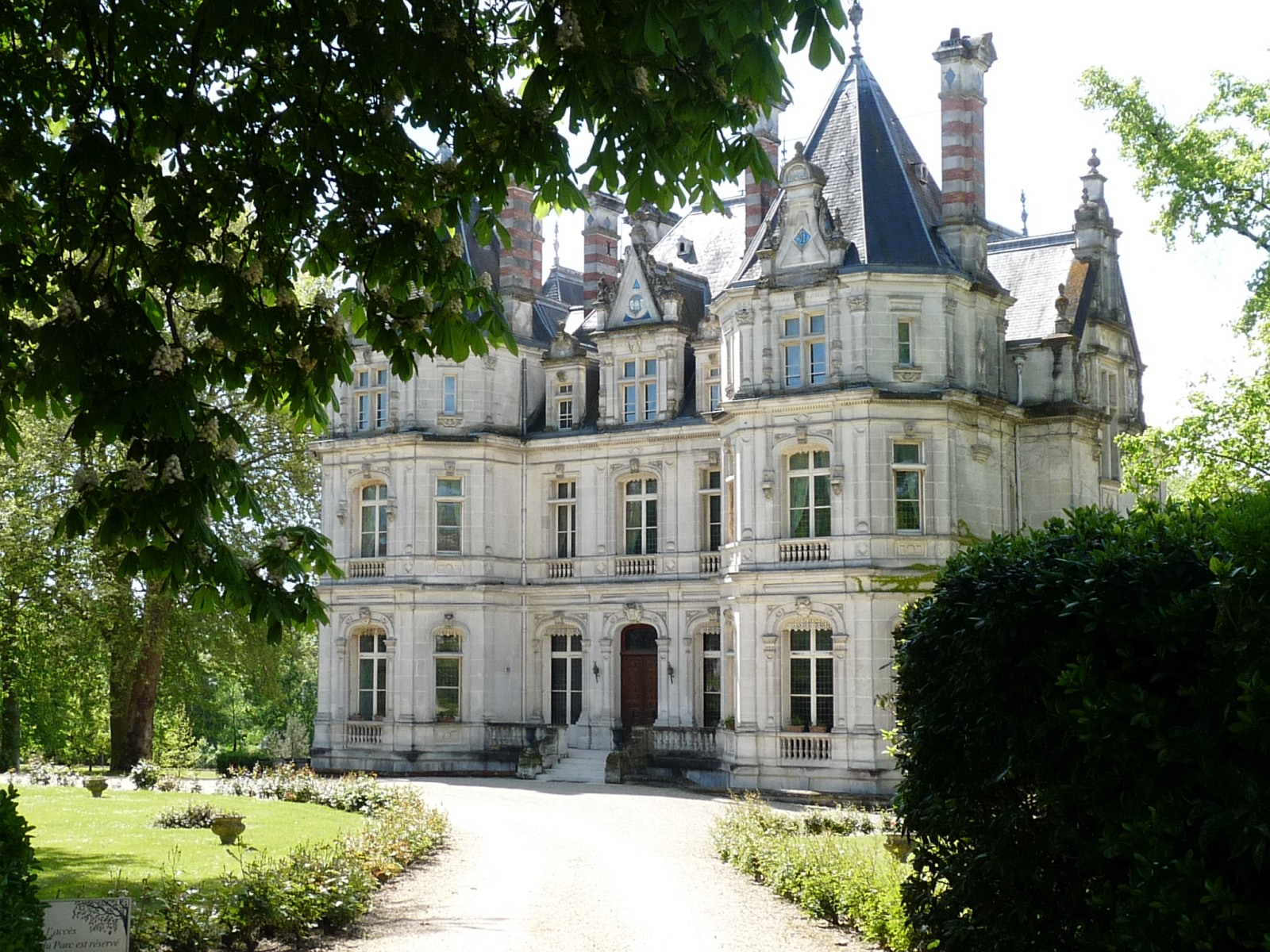
- Château Saint-Martial

- Flag Coat of arms
- Location of Jarnac
- Location within France Location within Nouvelle-Aquitaine
- Coordinates: 45°40′53″N 0°10′33″W
- Country: France
- Region: Nouvelle-Aquitaine
- Department: Charente
- Arrondissement: Cognac
- Canton: Jarnac
- Intercommunality: CA Grand Cognac

Government
  - Mayor (2020–2026): Philippe Gesse
- Area^{1}: 11.99 km^{2} (4.63 sq mi)
- Elevation: 19 m (62 ft)
- Highest elevation: 40 m (130 ft)
- Lowest elevation: 8 m (26 ft)
- Population (2023): 4,486
  - Density: 374.1/km^{2} (969.0/sq mi)
- Demonym: Jarnacais(e)
- Time zone: UTC+01:00 (CET)
  - Summer (DST): UTC+02:00 (CEST)
- INSEE/Postal code: 16167 /16200
- ^{1} French Land Register data, which excludes lakes, ponds, glaciers > 1 km^{2} (0.386 sq mi or 247 acres) and river estuaries.

Jarnac (French pronunciation: [ʒaʁnak]; Occitan: [d͡ʒaɾˈnak]; Saintongese: Jharnat) is a commune in the Charente department, southwestern France. It is situated on the right (north) bank of the river Charente 20 km west of Angoulême, and about 10 km east of Cognac.

It was the site of the Battle of Jarnac in 1569. The region has long been associated with the production of cognac. The town is host to numerous smaller cognac producers as well as larger internationally known brands such as Courvoisier, Delamain and Thomas Hine & Co. The commune is listed as a Village étape.

It is the birthplace and resting place of François Mitterrand, who served as president of France from 1981 to 1995 and is the last president born outside a metropolitan area to date.

== Population ==
Historical population

Year	Pop.	±% p.a.
1793	1,600	—
1800	1,725	+1.08%
1806	1,401	−3.41%
1821	1,934	+2.17%
1831	2,282	+1.67%
1841	2,510	+0.96%
1846	2,814	+2.31%
1851	3,358	+3.60%
1856	3,462	+0.61%
1861	3,854	+2.17%
1866	4,243	+1.94%
1872	4,691	+1.69%
1876	4,979	+1.50%
1881	4,356	−2.64%
1886	4,450	+0.43%
1891	4,880	+1.86%
1896	4,980	+0.41%
1901	4,911	−0.28%

Year	Pop.	±% p.a.
1906	4,894	−0.07%
1911	4,619	−1.15%
1921	4,075	−1.25%
1926	3,880	−0.98%
1931	3,796	−0.44%
1936	3,587	−1.13%
1946	3,885	+0.80%
1954	4,100	+0.68%
1962	4,574	+1.38%
1968	4,717	+0.51%
1975	5,042	+0.96%
1982	4,861	−0.52%
1990	4,786	−0.19%
1999	4,659	−0.30%
2007	4,508	−0.41%
2012	4,419	−0.40%
2017	4,403	−0.07%
2023	4,486	+0.31%

Source: EHESS and INSEE (1968–2023)

=== Countryside ===
The landscape, dominated by vineyards, appears remarkably organized and relatively undiversified. Yet, wooded areas and fields of grain lie alongside the vines.

The Charente river is a prominent geographical feature of the area. Described by Henry IV of France as "the most beautiful moat of the kingdom", this river is navigable for approximately 100 km and passes through varying landscapes such as agricultural land, wooded areas, villages, and small settlements. The river's several locks have been renovated to facilitate navigation. It also provides stopping points for recreational boats. Fishing and tourism is also popular on the river.

=== Prehistory ===
The site has been occupied since the Neolithic period. The "Grands Maisons" district was inhabited before the Roman era.

=== Antiquity ===
From Gallo-Roman Jarnac (Agernacus, or Agernacum?). The remains of pottery kilns attest to the existence of artisanal activity in the area. Jarnac was also a river port on the Charente River between Saintes and Angoulême during the Roman Empire. The Grand-Maisons ford allowed passage across the Charente.

After four centuries of Roman influence, the Visigoths took possession in 418.

=== Early Middle Ages ===
A century later, the Franks, led by Clovis I, spread as far as the Pyrenees.

A persistent tradition, though not recorded in writing, holds that a Merovingian castle once stood on the ridge overlooking the Charente River and the Lartige Valley, opposite the first valley. · .

The land of Jarnac belonged to the Counts of Angoulême, but also to the Prior of the Abbey of Saint-Cybard of Angoulême.

Then came the invasion of the Vikings, who came up the Charente River in 846, burning, devastating and pillaging everything in their path.

=== Middle Ages ===
It is under William Taillefer II, fifth Count of Angoulême, at the end of the 10th century, that mention is made of a lord of Jarnac, Count of La Marche, residing at the Château de Jarnac, located on the present-day "Place du Château", The founder with his wife "Rixendis", of the Abbey of Saint-Étienne de Bassac, where their tomb can still be seen.

From the second half of the 12th century, the Duchy of Aquitaine became English territory through the marriage of Eleanor of Aquitaine and Henry II Plantagenet. Around 1150, Philip of Cognac, the only illegitimate son of Richard the Lionheart, married the heiress of the lands of Cognac, Merpins, and Jarnac, becoming lord of the area. Having no heir, his domains passed to his uncle, John, King of England, and his wife, Isabella of Angoulême.

Their son, Henry III of England, returned the estate to Hugh X of Lusignan, Count of La Marche and Angoumois, who had married his mother, then widowed by the death of his father, John Lackland.

From the Plantagenets, Jarnac acquired certain communal rights, such as its franchises and liberties, which Cognac managed to retain, but which the Chabot family was quick to suppress in Jarnac.

During the Middle Ages, Jarnac was also on a secondary east–west route frequented by pilgrims to the shrine of Saint James of Santiago de Compostela and the relics of Eutropius of Saintes, in Saintes. The road from Limousin and Périgord is a route running along the Charente river via Angoulême and Cognac.

=== Late Middle Ages ===
After the House of Lusignan, the land of Jarnac passed successively to the Counts of Eu, the Dreux V de Mello (through the marriage of Geoffrey I, Count of Anjou, Geoffrey I of Lusignan (Lord of Jarnac)), the Craon family, and then in 1410, through the marriage in 1404 of William II of Craon, daughter of Jeanne of Montbazon, whose maternal grandparents were Maurice VI or VII of Craon (died 1330) and Margaret of the Mello family. Mello-Saint-Bris, lady of Jarnac and of Ste-Hermine, † around 1350/1360, daughter of Dreux V de Mello († c. 1317) : cf. the article Amaury III with Louis I Chabot (~1370-1422), of the illustrious Maison de Chabot. Marie and Louis are followed by their younger son Renaud Chabot (~1410-1476; x Isabeau de Rochechouart, heiress of Jean/Jacques de Rochechouart, lord of Apremont and of Brion), himself father of Louis II († around 1479/1481) and of Jacques Chabot de Jarnac († around 1496/1500; x Madeleine de Luxembourg, daughter of Thibault de Luxembourg de Fiennes). The latter was the father of the famous Admiral Philippe de Brion (1492-1543; part-lord of Jarnac), and of Charles Chabot (1487-1559), 1st Baron of Jarnac.

The Chabot family would reign in Jarnac from father to son for three centuries. Almost all were born at the castle, and almost all were buried in the Church of Saint-Pierre.

== Gallery ==
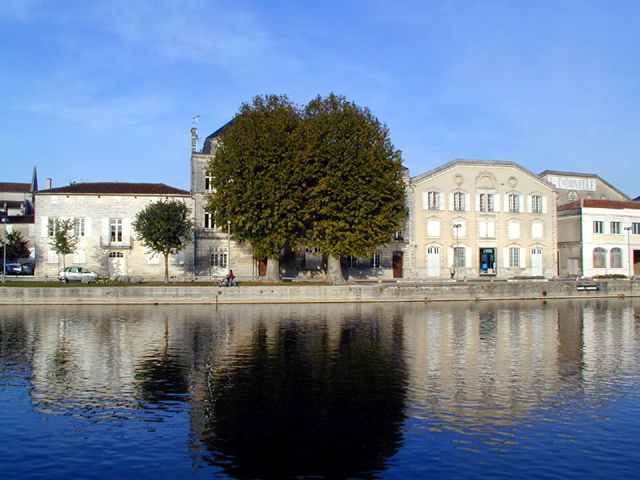
Musée Mitterrand

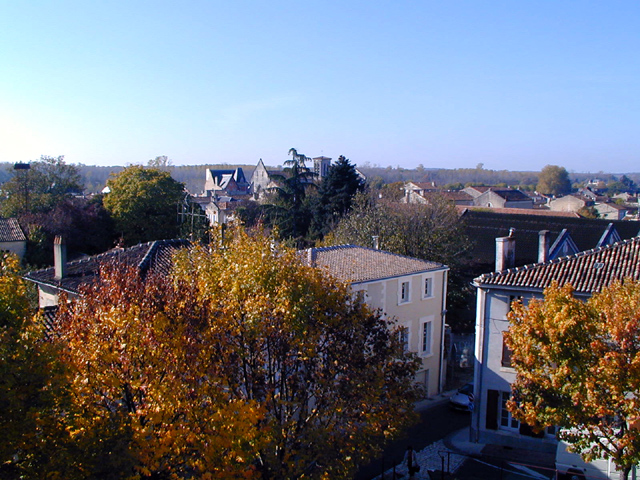
Church of Saint-Pierre in front of town hall

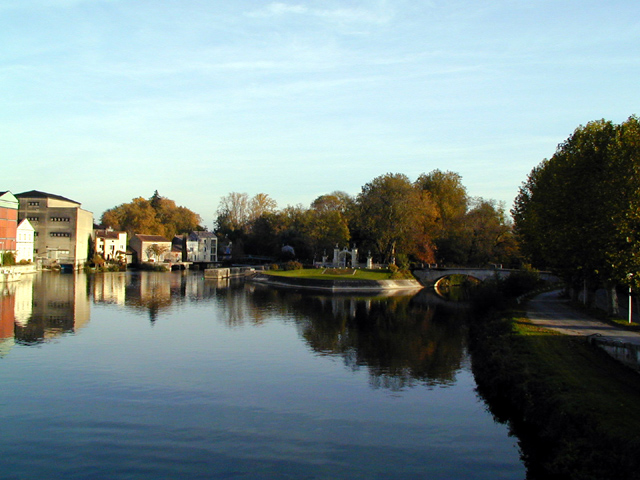
Park, the mills, l'Écluse

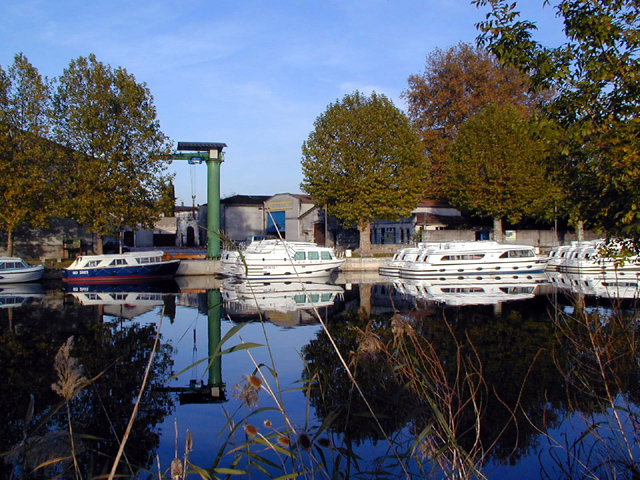
Port Gros-Jean

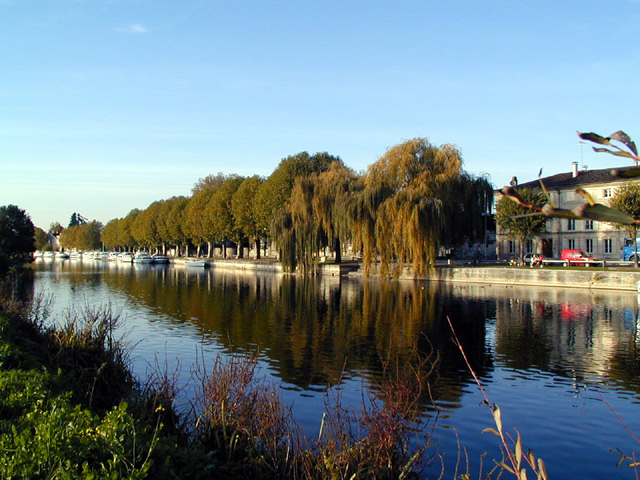
La Fontbadant

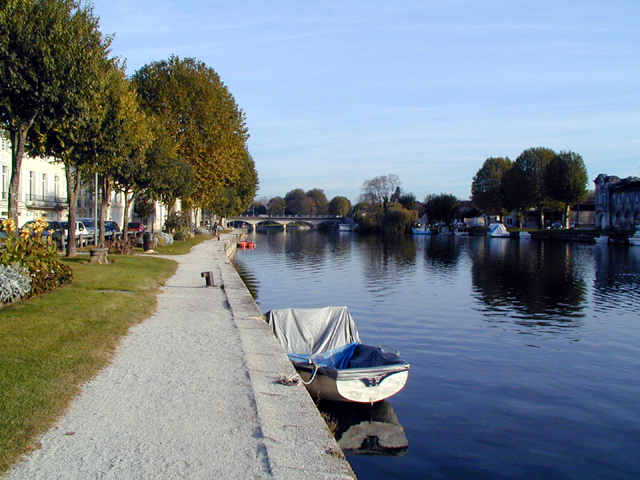
Grand pont on the Charente

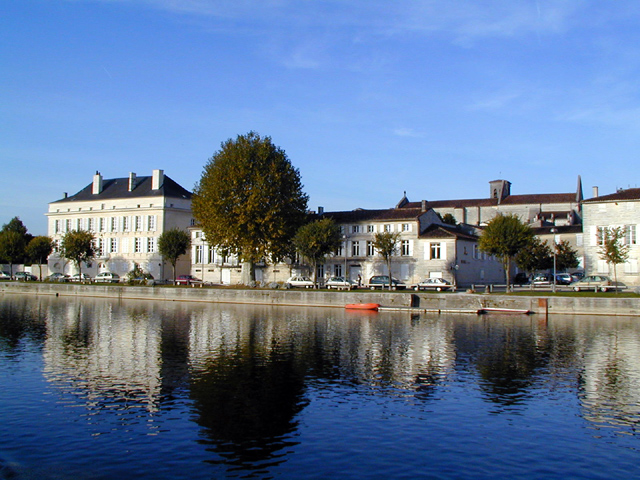
Quai de l'Orangerie with Thomas Hine & Co. house

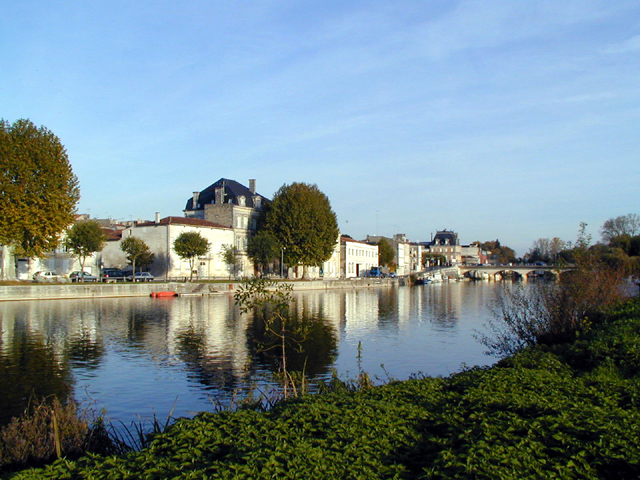
Quai de l'Orangerie and bridge

== Sister cities ==
Jarnac is paired with:

- Dalkeith, Scotland
- Lautertal (Odenwald), Germany
- Donnacona, Quebec, Canada
- Dogliani, Italy

== See also ==
- Communes of the Charente department
