= William VI of Angoulême =

Count of Angoulême

William VI of Angoulême (died 1179 (Note: Historians have given a variety of dates for William's death. Watson (453) gives it as 1179, backed up by charter evidence (353–62). Geoffrey of Vigeois' chronicle (325–26) also declares William to have died in 1179 and his son Wulgrin III to have ruled for only two years, dying in 1181.)) was also known as William Taillefer IV. The eldest son of Count Wulgrin II of Angoulême and his first wife, Poncia, daughter of Roger the Poitevin and Almodis, he succeeded his father at the head of the county of Angoulême in 1140.

William married Emma of Limoges(d?). He married a second time to Marguerite of Turenne, daughter of viscount Raymond I of Turenne.

The territory of Wulgrin II passed down to William VI, then to William VI's sons: Wulgrin III of Angoulême who was the eldest, William VII of Angoulême and Aymer of Angoulême.

After the death of Aymer, the territory did not pass to Aymer's daughter, Isabella of Angoulême, Queen consort to John of England, but rather to the daughter of Wulgrim III, Mathilde of Angoulême, who had married Hugh IX of Lusignan, father of Hugh X of Lusignan. Mathilde and Hugh IX had no children together, and Mathilde's step-son Hugh X later married Aymer's daughter Isabella, after the death of her first husband, king John of England. The eldest son of Hugh X and Isabella came to inherit Angouleme (to the exclusion of Isabella's five children by King John).

== Sources ==
- Vincent, Nicholas (1999). "Isabella of Angouleme:John's Jezebel". In Church, S.D. (ed.). King John: New Interpretations. Boydell Press.

Preceded by Wulgrin II	Count of Angoulême; 1140–1179	Succeeded by Wulgrin III
