= Arnald II of Angoulême =

10th century French Count

Arnald II "Manzer" (died 988) was Count of Angoulême from 975 to his death in 988.

== Biography ==
He was the illegitimate son of Count William Taillefer I and the brother of Count Aymer II.

Upon his father's retirement to a monastery in 945, their cousin Bernard, Count of Périgord took over the county on his behalf. In 975, despite his illegitimate birth, Arnald laid claim to Angoulême and received the support of Duke William IV of Aquitaine. In a battle he killed his cousin Ralph I, and retook Angoulême.

In the following years, Arnald consolidated and expanded his power at the expense of Bishop Hugh of Angoulême. He also made himself protector (advocatus) of the Abbey of Saint-Cybard.

Arnald supported William IV of Aquitaine in his feud against of Boso I of La Marche and captured his son Gauzbert, whom he handed over to the Duke. In 988 he took the vows and retired to the Abbey of Saint-Cybard where he died shortly afterwards.

== Issue ==
Arnald was married successively to Raingarde and Aldearde, the former of whom was the mother of his son William II.
