= Adalard, Count of Paris =

French noble, 8th Count of Paris (c. 830 – 890)

Adalardʻs child Adelaide of Paris

Adalard (Adalhard) of Paris (c. 830 – 10 October 890) was the eighth Count of Paris and a Count palatine. He was the son of Wulfhard of Flavigny and Suzanne of Paris, a daughter of Beggo, Count of Toulouse. His brother Hilduin the Young was the abbot of Saint-Denis. His brother Wulgrin I of Angoulême was appointed Count of Angoulême and Périgord. Adalard succeeded his uncle Leuthard II as Count of Paris.

Adalard had at least two children:

- Wulfhard
- Adelaide of Paris (850 – 10 November 901). She married Frankish king Louis the Stammerer.

== Sources ==
- Le Jan, R. (1995). Famille et pouvoir dans le monde franc (VIIe-Xe siècle): essai d'anthropologie sociale. Histoire ancienne et médiévale (in French). Publications de la Sorbonne. p. 215. ISBN 978-2-85944-268-2. "Le descendant de Gérard de Paris qui obtint le comté de Paris vers 882 se nommait Adalhard. Il était le seul des quatre fils du comte Wulfhard et de son épouse Suzanne, elle-même fille du comte de Paris Bégon, à avoir reçu un nom ..."
- McDougall, Sara (2017). Royal Bastards: The Birth of Illegitimacy, 800-1230. Oxford University Press.
