= Hugh X of Lusignan =

13th-century French aristocrat

Hugh X
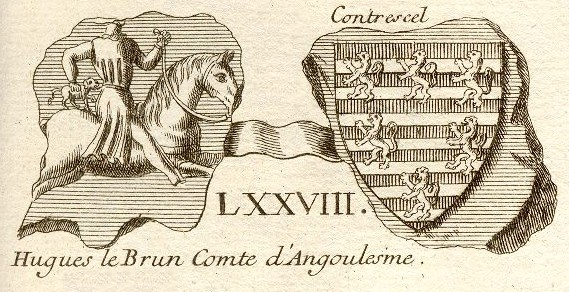
- Seal of Hugh X of Lusignan, showing him in hunting costume holding a small hunting dog behind the croup of his saddle, following the usual imagery in the seals of his family (Note: Seal of Hugues X de Lusignan dated 1224. Sceau équestre: le comte à cheval, en costume de chasse, le cor au cou et tenant à la main un petit chien posé sur la croupe du cheval. Legend: * SIGILL' : HVGONIS : DE : LEZINIACO : COMITIS : ENGOLISME; Revers. Écu burelé. Le champ à arabesques. Legend: + SIGILL' “ HVGONIS : DE : LEZINIACO : COMITIS : MARCHIE.). Douet d’Arcq, Collection de Sceaux des Archives de l’Empire 1, 1 (1863), 397–398.)

Count of La Marche
- Coat of arms: Arms of Hugh X of Lusignan: Barry argent and azure.
- Reign: 5 November 1219 – 5 June 1249
- Predecessor: Hugh IX
- Successor: Hugh XI
- Born: c. 1183
- Died: c. 5 June 1249 (aged 65-66)
- Noble family: House of Lusignan
- Spouse: Isabel of Angoulême
- Issue: Hugh XI of Lusignan; Aymer de Lusignan; Agathe de Lusignan; Alice de Lusignan, Countess of Surrey; Guy de Lusignan; Geoffroi de Lusignan; William de Valence, 1st Earl of Pembroke; Marguerite de Lusignan; Isabella of Lusignan
- Father: Hugh IX of Lusignan
- Mother: Agathe de Preuilly

Another seal of Hugh X

Seal of Hugh X of Lusignan. Legend: "SIGILL(UM) HUGONIS DE LEZINIACO COMITIS ENGOLISM" (Seal of Hugh of Lusignan Count of Angoulême). On the reverse is added "COMITIS MARCHIE" (Count of La Marche). The hunting horn is clearly seen hanging from his neck. National Archives, Paris

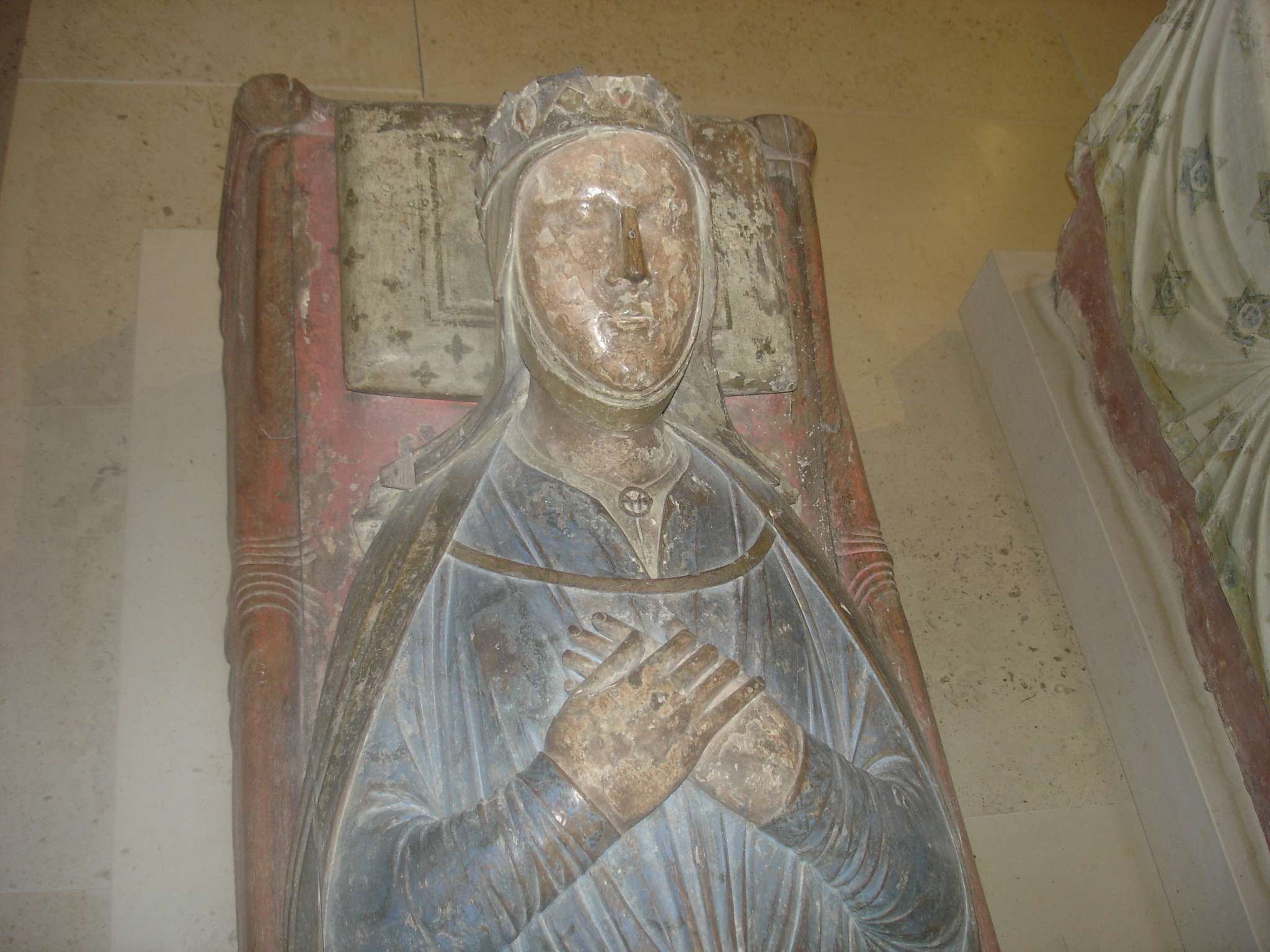
Isabelle d'Angoulême

Hugh X de Lusignan or Hugh V of La Marche (c. 1183 – c. 5 June 1249, Angoulême) was Seigneur de Lusignan and Count of La Marche in November 1219 and was Count of Angoulême by marriage. He was the son of Hugh IX.

== Background ==
Hugh's father, Hugh IX of Lusignan, was betrothed to marry 12-year-old Isabel of Angoulême in 1200, but King John of England married her instead. As a result, the entire de Lusignan family rebelled against the English king. Hugh IX married Agathe de Preuilly instead.

Hugh was born in 1183. (Note: Sidney Painter indicates Hugh IX's first wife as unknown.) He married Isabella, widow of King John of England, on 10 May 1220. By Hugh's marriage to Isabella, he became Count of Angoulême until her death in 1246. Together they founded the abbey of Valence.

In 1224, Hugh joined with King Louis VIII of France against the Angevins, being promised the city of Bordeaux. By 1226, he had become embittered against Louis' lack of support in conquering Gascony.

== Marriage and issue ==
Hugh and Isabella had:

- Hugh XI de Lusignan, seigneur of Lusignan, Count of La Marche and Count of Angoulême (1221–1250)
- Aymer de Lusignan, Bishop of Winchester c. 1250 (c. 1222 – Paris, 5 December 1260 and buried there)
- Agatha de Lusignan (c. 1223 – aft. 7 April 1269), married Guillaume II de Chauvigny, seigneur of Châteauroux (1224 – Palermo, 3 January 1271)
- Alice de Lusignan (1224 – 9 February 1256), married 1247 John de Warenne, 6th Earl of Surrey
- Guy de Lusignan (d. 1264), seigneur of Couhé, Cognac, and Archiac in 1249, killed at the Battle of Lewes. (Note: Prestwich states he fled after the Battle of Lewes)
- Geoffrey de Lusignan (d. 1274), seigneur of Jarnac, married in 1259 Jeanne de Châtellerault, Vicomtess of Châtellerault (d. 16 May 1315) and had issue:
  - Eustachie de Lusignan (d. Carthage, Tunisia, 1270), married 1257 Dreux III de Mello (d. 1310)
- Guillaume de Lusignan (d. 1296); known in English as William de Valence married Joan de Munchensi or Munchensy (c. 1230 – after 20 September 1307), the only surviving child of Warin de Munchensi, lord of Swanscombe, and his first wife Joan Marshal, who was one of the five daughters of William Marshal, 1st Earl of Pembroke and Isabel de Clare, 4th Countess of Pembroke suo jure.
- Margaret de Lusignan (c. 1226/1228–1288), married (1st) 1240/1241 Raymond VII of Toulouse (1197–1249), married (2nd) c. 1246 Aimery IX de Thouars, Viscount of Thouars (d. 1256), and married (3rd) Geoffrey V de Chateaubriant, seigneur of Chateubriant
- Isabella of Lusignan (1224 – 14 January 1299), lady of Beauvoir-sur-Mer et de Mercillac, married (1st) Maurice IV de Craon (1224/1239 – soon before 27 May 1250/1277) (2nd) Geoffrey de Rancon, seigneur of Taillebourg.

Hugh X was succeeded by his eldest son, Hugh XI of Lusignan.

According to explanations in the manuscripts of Gaucelm Faidit's poems, this troubadour was a rival of Hugh X of Lusignan for the love of Marguerite d'Aubusson.

He was buried in Angoulême.

== Sources ==
- Carpenter, David (2020). Henry III: The Rise to Power and Personal Rule, 1207–1258. Yale University Press. ISBN 978-0-300-23835-8.
- Hallam, Elizabeth M. (1990). Capetian France: 987–1328. Longman.
- Painter, Sidney (1955). "The Houses of Lusignan and Chatellerault 1150–1250". Speculum. 30 (3 July). The University of Chicago Press: 374–384. doi:10.2307/2848076. JSTOR 2848076. S2CID 162997835.
- Prestwich, Michael (1988). Edward I. University of California Press.
- Vincent, Nicholas (1999). "Isabella of Angouleme: John's Jezebel". In Church, S.D. (ed.). King John: New Interpretations. The Boydell Press.

Preceded by Hugh IX	Count of La Marche; 1219–1249	Succeeded by Hugh XI
Preceded by Aymer Taillefer	Count of Angoulême; 1220–1246; With: Isabel of Angoulême	Succeeded by Hugh XI
