= Bernard, Count of Périgord =

10th-century French Count of Périgord

Bernard of Périgord (died 950) was a 10th-century Count of Périgord from 918 to his death and Count of Angoulême from 945 to 950. He was from West Francia.

== Biography ==
Bernard was the son of Count William I of Périgord and Regelindis, daughter of Raymond I, Count of Toulouse, who was a relative of his grandmother.

Immediately after the death of Alduin I of Angoulême in 916, Bernard killed the viscount of Marcillac, Lambert, and his brother Ranulf, who were responsible for an attack on his aunt, Sancia, the sister of William I and wife of Aymer I of Angoulême.

His father William died in 918 and was succeeded by Bernard as Count of Périgord. Bernard co-ruled Angoulême with his cousin William Taillefer I and his son Aymer II, donating property to the Abbey of Saint-Cybard with them in 942.

Bernard died in 950 and was succeeded by his son Arnald I.

== Issue ==
Bernard first married Berta and had five children with her:

- Arnald "Voratio" I (d.962)
- William III "Talleyrand" (d.962)
- Gauzbert (d.975)
- Bernard (d.before 975)
- Emma, married to Boso I of La Marche (d.after 988)

Bernard then married Garsenda, and had five more children:

- Ranulf "Bompar" (d.975)
- Richard "the Simple" (d.after 975)
- Alduin (d.before 975)
- Heli de Périgord (d.976)
- Godfrey (d.before 975)
