= Richard I of Périgord =

Count of Angoulême and Périgord

Richard I, "the Simple" was Count of Angoulême and Périgord briefly in 975.

== Biography ==
Richard was the son of Count Bernard of Périgord with his second wife Garsenda.

After his two half brothers Arnald I "Voratio" and William III "Talleyrand" had died within a short time of each other around 962, his brother Ralph "Bompar" succeeded to Périgord and Angoulême.

The bastard son of William II Taillefer, Arnald II "Manzer" revolted with the support of Duke William IV of Aquitaine. In 975, Manzer killed Ralph in battle.

Richard took the title of Count for a short time, until Manzer captured Angoulême and Richard and his brothers Gauzbert and Heli. Richard and Gauzbert were executed in Périgord, however, Heli escaped and proclaimed himself Count, but died shortly after and was succeeded in Périgord by his sister Emma's husband Boso I of La Marche.
