= William I of Périgord =

William I of Périgord was a French noble and Count of Périgord from 886 to his death in 918.

== Biography ==
According to the monk and chronicler Ademar of Chabannes, William was the second son of Wulgrin, Count of Angoulême and his wife Regelindis, the daughter of Bernard of Septimania, Count of Barcelona.

Wulgrin I died in 886, leaving Angoulême to his first son Alduin, and Périgord to William.

William died in 918 and was succeeded by his son Bernard.
