= Wulgrin III of Angoulême =

Count of Angoulême

Wulgrin III of Angoulême is also known as Wulgrin Taillefer II. He inherited the title of Count of Angoulême and its territories from his father, William VI of Angoulême, in 1179.

His untimely death was the first break in the house of Taillefer, which had ruled Angoulême since the days of the Carolingians. As he had only one daughter, Mathilde of Angoulême, the territory went to his younger brother, William VII of Angoulême. Wulgrin's daughter, Mathilde, would marry Hugh IX of Lusignan, who would eventually inherit the kingdom, over the claims of John of England, through Isabella of Angoulême, the daughter of Aymer of Angoulême, the third and youngest brother.

== Sources ==
- Histoire P@ssion - Chronologie historique des Comtes d’Angoulême (in French)
- L'art de Verifier des Faits historiques, des Chartes, des Chroniques, et Autres Anciens Monuments, Depuis la Naissance de Notre-Seigner by Moreau et Yalade, 1818, Page 189
- The coinage of the European continent, by Swan Sonnenschein, 1893, Page 276
- Annuaire Historique Pour L'annee 1854, by Société de l'histoire de France, Page 180
- Nouvelle Encyclopedie Theologique, by Jacques-Paul Migne, 1854, Page 903
- Geoffrey of Vigeois. "Chronica Gaufredi coenobitae monasterii D. Martialis Lemovicensis, ac prioris Vosiensis coenobii." In Novae bibliothecae manuscriptorum librorum tomus secundus: rerum aquitanicarum. . . . Edited by Philippe Labbe, 279–342. Paris: Sebastian Cramoisy, 1657. (His chronicle, in Latin, on Gallica)
- Watson, Rowan Charles. "The Counts of Angoulême from the 9th to the Mid 13th Century." PhD diss., University of East Anglia, 1979.

Preceded by William VI	Count of Angoulême; 1179–1181	Succeeded by William VII
