= Maurice VI de Craon =

French noble

- Lord of Craon
- Lozengy or and gules

inherited
- Coat of arms: Ecu losanges d'or et de gueules
- Predecessor: Maurice V de Craon
- Successor: Amaury II de Craon
- Born: c. 1255
- Died: 10 February 1292
- Buried: Angers
- Family: Craon family
- Wife: Mahaut de Malines
- Father: Maurice V de Craon
- Mother: Isabella of Lusignan
- Occupation: Ambassador to England

Maurice VI de Craon (c. 1255–1292) was Lord of Craon, Chantocé, Sablé, Briolé and La Suze. He served as Seneschal of Anjou, Touraine and Maine and in 1289 as Lieutenant of Aquitaine.

== Family ==
Maurice VI was the son of Maurice V de Craon and his wife, Isabelle de Lezignem. His sister, Jeanne de Craon, married Gerard Chabot II. Maurice VI succeeded on his father's death in 1282.

== Career ==
He had the Chapel of John the Baptist built for his family's sepulchre in the Church of the Cordeliers in Angers.

He served as ambassador to England. On his return, 1 February 1292, in Paris, he wrote his testament and, ten days later, died.

== Marriage, issue and succession ==
In 1277 he married Mathilde Marie Berthout of Mechelen, daughter of Walter VII Berthout, Lord of Mechelen, and his wife Marie d'Auvergne. They had several children:

- Amaury III, (c. 1278-1333) who succeeded to the titles.
- Marie de Craon, Lady of Châtelais, married 25 August 1303 Robert de Brienne, Viscount of Beaumont and Maine and Lord of Pouancé. She died 21 August 1312.
- Isabelle de Craon, wife of Olivier de Clisson, died 30 June 1310 and was interred in the family tomb built for her father.
- Jeanne de Craon, died 25 August 1312 unmarried and without issue.

== See also ==
- Craon family
