= Count of Périgord =

Noble title in the peerage of France

Count of Périgord (Fr.: comte de Périgord) is a noble title in the peerage of France. Originally known as "The sovereign house of the Counts of Périgord, princes by the grace of God". The first recorded sovereign Count was Emenon, who was also Count of Poitiers and Count of Angoulême. Most likely, the title was bestowed on Emenon in 845 by Pepin I of Aquitaine as a reward for Emenon fighting with Pepin against Louis the Pious. The title takes its name from the Périgord region of France, and the historic seat of the Counts of Périgord was Périgueux.

Shield of the Count of Périgord

== List of Counts of Périgord ==
=== House of Guilhelmides, 845–866 ===
From	To	Count of Périgord	Relationship to predecessor	Other titles held
845	866	Emenon (d. 866)	First Count of Périgord	Count of Poitiers, Count of Angoulême

=== House of Taillefer, 866–975 ===
From	To	Count of Périgord	Relationship to predecessor	Other titles held
866	886	Wulgrin I (d. 886)	Tutor of Emenon's children	Count of Angoulême
886	920	William I of Périgord (d. 920)	Son of Wulgrin I	Count of Angoulême, Count of Agenais
920	924	Bernard I of Périgord (d. 924)	Son of William I	Count of Angoulême
924	962	Arnold I of Périgord (d. 962)	Son of Bernard I	Count of Angoulême
962	962	William II of Périgord (d. 962)	Brother of Arnold I	
962	975	Raoul I of Périgord (d. 975)	Brother of William II	
975	975	Richard of Périgord (d. 975)	Brother of Raoul I	

=== House of Charroux, 975–1072 ===
From	To	Count of Périgord	Relationship to predecessor	Other titles held
975	988	Boso I, Count of La Marche (d. 988)	Son-in-law of William I of Périgord	Count of La Marche
97?	979	Elias I of Périgord (919–979)	Son of Boso I, Count of La Marche	
979	995	Adalbert I of Périgord (924–995)	Brother of Elias I	Count of Haute Marche
995	1010	Boso II of Périgord (d. 1010)	Brother of Adalbert I	Count of Basse-Marche (until 1006)
1010	1031	Elias II of Périgord (996–1031)	Son of Boso II	
1031	1072	Adalbert II of Périgord (1020–1072)	Son of Elias II	

=== House of Talleyrand, 1072–1399 ===
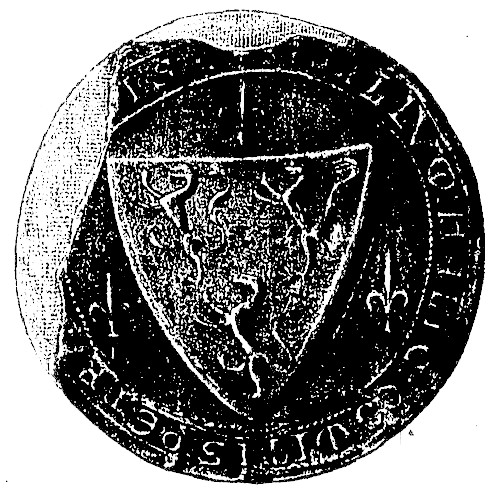
The seal of Elias VI of Périgord

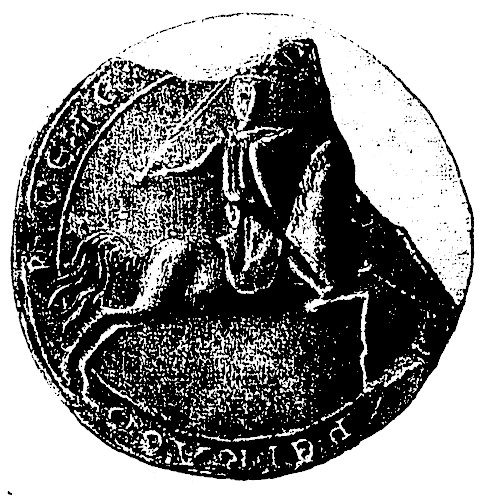
The counter-seal of Elias VI of Périgord

From	To	Count of Périgord	Relationship to predecessor	Other titles held
1072	1104	Elias III of Périgord (1055–1104)	Son of Adalbert II	
1104	1115	William III of Périgord (1080–1115)	Son of Elias III	
1115	1155	Elias IV of Périgord (1083–1155)	Brother of William III	
1155	1166	Boso III of Périgord (1106–1166)	Brother of Elias IV	
1166	1205	Elias V of Périgord (1136–1205)	Son of Boso III	
1205	1212	Archambaud I of Périgord (d. 1212)	Son of Elias V	
1212	1239	Archambaud II of Périgord (1164–1239)	Brother of Archambaud I	
1239	1251	Elias VI of Périgord (d. 1251)	Son of Archambaud II	
1251	1295	Archambaud III of Périgord (1237–1295)	Son of Elias VI	
1295	1311	Elias VII of Périgord (1261–1311)	Son of Archambaud III	
1311	1336	Archambaud IV of Périgord (d. 1336)	Son of Elias VII	
1336	1368	Roger-Bernard of Périgord (1299–1368)	Brother of Archambaud IV	
1368	1398	Archambaud V of Périgord (1339–1399); deposed in 1398	Son of Roger-Bernard	
1398	1399	Archambaud VI of Périgord (d. 1430); deposed in 1399	Son of Archambaud V	

In 1399, Charles VI of France deprived the last Count of Périgord of his lands. In 1400, the king granted the title to his supporter, Louis I, Duke of Orléans.

=== House of Orléans, 1400–1437 ===
From	To	Count of Périgord	Relationship to predecessor	Other titles held
1400	1407	Louis I, Duke of Orléans (1372–1407)	No relation	Duke of Orléans
1407	1437	Charles I, Duke of Orléans (1394–1465)	Son of Louis I, Duke of Orléans	Duke of Orléans

In 1437, Charles, Duke of Orléans sold the title of "Count of Périgord" to John I, Count of Penthièvre.

=== House of Châtillon, 1437–1481 ===
From	To	Count of Périgord	Relationship to predecessor	Other titles held
1437	1452	John I (d. 1452)	No relation	Count of Penthièvre, Viscount of Limoges
1452	1453	William (1400–1453)	Brother of John	Viscount of Limoges
1453	1481	Frances (d. 1481)	Daughter of William	Viscountess of Limoges

Frances married Alain I of Albret and the title of "Count of Périgord" was inherited by their son, John III of Navarre.

=== House of Albret, 1481–1572 ===
From	To	Count of Périgord	Relationship to predecessor	Other titles held
1481	1516	John III of Navarre (1469–1516)	Son of Françoise of Périgord	King Consort of Navarre
1516	1555	Henry II of Navarre (1503–1555)	Son of John III of Navarre	King of Navarre
1555	1572	Jeanne III of Navarre (1528–1572)	Daughter of Henry II of Navarre	Queen of Navarre

=== House of Bourbon, 1572–1604 ===
From	To	Count of Périgord	Relationship to predecessor	Other titles held
1572	1584	Henry IV of France (1553–1610)	Son of Jeanne III of Navarre	King of Navarre, King of France (in 1589, by which point he had already relinquished the title of "Count of Périgord")
1584	1604	Catherine de Bourbon (1559–1604)	Sister of Henry IV of France	

Catherine de Bourbon was the last individual to hold the title of Count or Countess of Périgord; she died childless.
