= Alice of Courtenay =

French noblewoman

- Countess of Angouleme; Countess of Joigny
- Born: 1160; France
- Died: 12 February 1218 (aged 57–58)
- Noble family: Capetian House of Courtenay
- Spouses: Andrew, lord of La Ferté-Gaucher; William I, Count of Joigny; Aymer Taillefer, Count of Angouleme
- Issue: Peter of Joigny; Isabella, Queen of England
- Father: Peter I of Courtenay
- Mother: Elisabeth of Courtenay

Alice of Courtenay (French: Alix; 1160 – 12 February 1218) was a French noblewoman. Her father was Peter I of Courtenay and her brother was Peter II of Courtenay, Latin Emperor of Constantinople. Alice married twice; by her second husband, Count Aymer of Angoulême, she was the mother of the English queen Isabella of Angoulême.

== Family ==
Alice was born in 1160, the second-eldest daughter and one of the ten children of Peter I of Courtenay and Elisabeth of Courtenay, daughter of Renauld de Courtenay and Hawise du Donjon. Her family was one of the most illustrious in France; and her paternal grandparents were King Louis VI of France and Adelaide of Maurienne. Her eldest brother Peter became the Latin emperor of Constantinople in 1216.

Alice's first husband was Andrew, lord of La Ferté-Gaucher, Champagne, whom she married some time after 1169. Following his death in 1177, Alice married Count William I of Joigny. The marriage produced one surviving child, Peter, later count of Joigny, (d.1222). The couple were divorced c. 1184. A charter dated 1180 records that Count William, with Alice's consent, donated property to Pontigny Abbey. Alice married her third husband, Aymer of Angoulême, c. 1186. That year he succeeded his brother, William V, as count of Angoulême. The marriage produced one surviving child, Isabella (c. 1188 – 1246). Aymer died on 16 June 1202 and was succeeded by their daughter, Isabella. Isabella married King John of England in 1200.

Alice died on 12 February 1218 at the age of about 58.

== Sources ==
- Vincent, Nicholas (1999). "Isabella of Angouleme:John's Jezebel". In Church, S. D. (ed.). King John: New Interpretations. The Boydell Press.
