= Count of Paris =

French noble title

Coat of arms of Paris

Count of Paris (French: Comte de Paris) was a title for the local magnate of the district around Paris in Carolingian times. After Hugh Capet was elected King of the Franks in 987, the title merged into the crown and fell into disuse. However, it was later revived by the Orléanist pretenders to the French throne in an attempt to evoke the legacy of Capet and his dynasty.

== Merovingian counts ==
=== Guideschi ===
- Bodilon
- till 678: Saint Warinus (620–678)

=== Pippinids ===
- 748–753: Grifo (726–753), son of Charles Martel and his second wife, Swanahild

== Carolingian counts ==
=== Girardids ===
- 759/760–779: Gerard I (died 779)
- 779–811: Stephen (754–811), son of previous
- 811–813: Leuthard I of Paris (?–813), brother of previous and also Count of Fézensac
- 813–816: Beggo (?–816), brother of previous and also Count of Toulouse
- 838–841: Gerard II (810–877/879), son of Leuthard I and brother of Adalard the Seneschal, also duke of Viennois
- 841–858: Leuthard II of Paris (806–858), son of Beggo

=== Welfs ===
- 858–859: Conrad I the Elder (800–862/4), also Count of Argengau and of Linz

=== Girardids ===
- 877–?: Adalard (830–890), Count palatine, father of Adelaide who was the wife of King Louis II of France

=== Robertians ===
- 882/3–888: Odo (857–898), later king of West Francia
- 888–922: Robert (866–923), also Count of Blois, Anjou, Tours, and Orléans, Margrave of Neustria, and later king of West Francia
- 923–956: Hugh the Great (898–956), also Duke of the Franks
- 956–987: Hugh Capet (939–996), later King of the Franks

=== Bouchardids ===
- 987–1005: Bouchard I the Venerable (died 1005), also Count of Vendôme, Corbeil, and Melun
- 1005–1017: Renaud of Vendôme (991–1017), also Bishop of Paris as well as Count of Vendôme

== Orléanist counts ==
=== July Monarchy ===
In 1838, during the July Monarchy, King Louis-Philippe I granted the title to his newly born grandson, Philippe. After Louis-Philippe abdicated during the French Revolution of 1848, Orléanist monarchists considered Philippe and his descendants to be the legitimate heirs to the throne. In 1870, at the beginning of the French Third Republic, Philippe and the Orléanists agreed to support the legitimist pretender, Henri, Count of Chambord, but resumed Philippe's claims after Henri's death in 1883.

- 1838–1848: Philippe, Count of Paris (1838–1894)

=== Counts of Paris without legal creation ===
In 1929, Orléanist pretender Jean d'Orléans, Duke of Guise (1874-1940) granted the title "Count of Paris" to his only son Henri d'Orléans (1908–1999), a courtesy title Henri retained until his death and under which he was best known. After him, the title has been adopted by his successors in capacity as the Orléanist pretender to the French throne.

- 1929–1999: Henri, Count of Paris (1908–1999)
- 1999–2019: Henri, Count of Paris (1933–2019)
- 2019–present: Jean, Count of Paris (born 1965)

The next in line is Jean's eldest son, Prince Gaston Louis Antoine Marie d’Orléans (born 2009).

== See also ==
- List of French monarchs
- Siege of Paris (885-886)
- House of Capet
- Orléanists
