= Renaud I de Craon =

Renaud de Craon, (c. 1060–1101) was Lord of Craon and the son of Robert de Nevers and Blanche de Sablé.

He became Lord of Craon, title first granted by Geoffrey II, Count of Anjou to his father, then definitively by his marriage with the granddaughter of Guérin, heir to the land of Craon, according to what he himself claimed in a charter of Trinity Abbey, Vendôme.

In 1098, he founded La Roë Abbey.

He married Ennoguen de Vitré with whom he had four children;

1. Maurice (future Lord of Craon),
2. Henri de Craon-Nevers, knight, married a daughter of the Lord de Candie-Chaffaron, in Chambéry, Kingdom of Burgundy
3. Robert (2nd Master of the Knights Templar),
4. Mahaut/Mahault.

Quintin, regular Abbot of La Roë, served the last rites to Renaud le Bourguignon, on 2 December 1101.

== See also ==
- Craon family
