= Aymer II of Angoulême =

Count of Angoulême

Aymer II was Count of Angoulême from 945 to his death in 952.

== Family ==
Aymer was the illegitimate son of Count William Taillefer I of Angoulême and an unknown concubine. His brother was Count Arnald II Manzer of Angoulême.

== Biography ==
Aymer first appears in a document dated around 942: in which his father William Taillefer I donated property to the Abbey of Saint-Cybard and the deed of donation was also countersigned by his cousin Bernard, Count of Périgord (Bernardi comitis) and by his son Aymer, (Adhemari comitis filii Guillemi).

He started to co-rule Angoulême with his father from 945 until his death, predeceasing his father.

Aymer did not marry and had no known descendants.
