= Wulgrin I of Angoulême =

Count of Angoulême from 866 to 886

Wulgrin (or Vulgrin, Woulgrin) I (c. 830 – 3 May 886) was the Count of Angoulême, Périgueux, and possibly Saintonge from 866 to his death. His parents were Vulfard (Wulfard), Count of Flavigny, and Suzanne, who was a daughter of Count Bego of Paris. His brother Hilduin the Young was the abbot of Saint-Denis. Another brother was Adalard of Paris. Ademar of Chabannes is the chief source on his active reign in preserving and moulding Angoulême.

Although a foreigner, Charles the Bald installed Wulgrin as the count of Angoumois, Périgord, and possibly Saintange, in 869. He was the last example in Western Francia of the royal will imposing its preferred administrator on a region, indicating the decline in the power of central administration in the divisions of the former Empire following the Treaty of Verdun.

Between 869 and 878, he built many castles, to defend against the Vikings, and experienced some success limiting their movements in Aquitaine. He appointed a viscount named Ranulf over the fortress called Matas and another named Giselbert over Maurillac.

Wulgrin married Regelindis (Roselinde), a daughter of Bernard of Septimania, Duke of Septimania and Count of Barcelona . Their children were:

- Alduin (d. 916), Count of Angoulême
- William I (d. 920), Count of Périgord and Agen
- Sancha (?), married Adémar, Count of Angoulême

== Sources ==
- Lewis, Archibald R. (1965). The Development of Southern French and Catalan Society, 718–1050. University of Texas Press.
- Histoire P@ssion – Chronologie historique des Comtes d’Angoulême (in French)
- The Descent, Name and Arms of Borlase of Borlase in the County of Cornwall by William Copeland Borlase, Page 13

Preceded by Emenon	Count of Angoulême; 866–886	Succeeded by Hilduin I
Preceded by Emenon	Count of Périgord; 866–886	Succeeded by William
