= Isabella of Lusignan =

French noblewoman

- Dame de Beauvoir-sur Mer et de Mercillac
- Born: c.1224-7
- Died: 14 January 1300 (aged 73-76)
- Noble family: Lusignan
- Spouses: Maurice IV, Sire of Craon; Geoffrey de Rancon
- Issue: Amuary II, Sire of Craon; Maurice V, Sire of Craon; Oliver, Archbishop of Tours; Margaret de Pressigny; Jeanne of Chabot
- Father: Hugh X de Lusignan, "le Brun", Seigneur de Lusignan, Count of La Marche
- Mother: Isabella of Angoulême

Isabella of Lusignan (c.1224 – 14 January 1300) was a daughter of Hugh X of Lusignan and Isabella of Angoulême. Isabella was half-sister to King Henry III of England. She was Dame de Beauvoir-sur Mer et de Mercillac.

== Lineage ==
Isabella's year of birth is unknown. She is mentioned in the Treaty of Vendome in March 1227. She was the daughter of Hugh X de Lusignan, "le Brun", Seigneur de Lusignan, Count of La Marche and Isabella of Angoulême, queen dowager of England.

== Life ==
Isabella was betrothed by the treaty of Vendôme in March 1227 to Alfonso, Count of Poitiers, the third surviving son of Louis VIII of France and Blanche of Castile. The marriage contract was however broken off and Alfonso instead married Joan, Countess of Toulouse.

Isabella was first married to Maurice IV, Sire of Craon. They were married until Maurice's death in 1250. They had the following children:

1. Amuary II (died 1269), successor to his father as Sire and married Yolande, daughter of John I, Count of Dreux but died without issue.
2. Maurice V (died 11 February 1293), succeeded his brother as Sire, married Matilda of Berthout and had issue.
3. Oliver (died 24 August 1285), Archbishop of Tours
4. Margaret (died after 16 August 1280), married Renaud de Pressigny
5. Jeanne (died before 1288), married Gerard II of Chabot and had a daughter named Isabella.

A charter dated October 1252 records a dispute with Isabella and her husband's will.

Only one year after Maurice's death, Isabella remarried Geoffrey de Rancon, a relative of a much older Geoffrey de Rancon. They had no children. Isabella was granted a payment by her half-brother King Henry III in 1254. After thirteen years of marriage Geoffrey died.

Isabella herself died on 14 January 1300 having most likely outlived all of her children. She had several grandchildren. Isabella also outlived all of her siblings (full and half).
