= Gerard I of Paris =

French noble

Gerard I of Paris (died 779) was a count of Paris. He was the founder of the House of Girardids.

== Biography ==
Gerard donated property to the abbey of St Denis by charter dated 11th of February 747.

Gerard married a certain Rotrude, possibly the daughter of Carloman. From this union was born:

- Stephen of Paris (c. 754 – 811/815), count of Paris
- Leuthard I of Paris (died 813), count of Paris
- Beggo of Paris (died 816), count of Paris
- Eva (born 770); married Hugo de Elzas I.

His son Stephen succeeded him to the title of count of Paris.

== Sources ==
- Le Jan, Régine (2003). Famille et pouvoir dans le monde franc (VIIe-Xe siècle): essai d'anthropologie sociale (in French). Publications de la Sorbonne.
- MGH Diplomatum Imperii I, Diplomata Maiorum Domum, n. 18, p. 104.
