= Fulk of Angoulême =

Count of Angoulême from 1048 to 1087

Fulk of Angoulême was the eleventh count of Angoulême. He was the son of Count Geoffrey of Angoulême and Petronille de Archiac. He died in 1087 or 1089, depending on the sources.

He had a son, who succeeded him in title and territory, William V.

Preceded by Geoffrey	Count of Angoulême; 1048–1087	Succeeded by William V
