= Geoffrey of Rancon =

Geoffrey III of Rancon was a French army commander who lived in the 12th century. He was Lord of Taillebourg, and served as Eleanor of Aquitaine's army commander during the Second Crusade.

On the day the crusaders were set to cross Mount Cadmus, King Louis VII of France chose to take charge of the rear of the column, where the unarmed pilgrims and the baggage trains marched. The vanguard, with which Queen Eleanor marched, was commanded by Rancon. Unencumbered by baggage, they reached the summit of Cadmus, where Rancon had been ordered to make camp for the night. Rancon, however, chose to continue on, deciding in concert with Amadeus III, Count of Savoy, Louis's uncle, that a nearby plateau would make a better campsite. Such disobedience was reportedly common.

Accordingly, by mid-afternoon, the rear of the column —believing the day's march to be nearly at an end —was dawdling. This resulted in the army becoming separated, with some having already crossed the summit and others still approaching it. At this point the Turks, who had been following and feinting for many days, seized their opportunity and attacked those who had not yet crossed the summit. The French, both soldiers and pilgrims, taken by surprise, were trapped. Those who tried to escape were caught and killed. Many men, horses, and much of the baggage were cast into the canyon below. Official blame for the disaster was placed on Rancon, who had made the decision to continue, and it was suggested that he be hanged, a suggestion which the king ignored. Instead, he sent Rancon home from the Crusade early, as a punishment. Today this is known as the Battle of Mount Cadmus.

He is also listed as having participated in the Third Crusade in the Itinerarium Regis Ricardi and appears as a witness to Richard I's peace treaty with Tancred of Sicily in Messina on 6 Oct 1190.

Geoffrey was the father of Bourgogne de Rancon, who married Hugh VIII of Lusignan.

Another Geoffrey of Rancon was married to Isabelle, the daughter of Eleanor's daughter in law Isabella of Angoulême.
