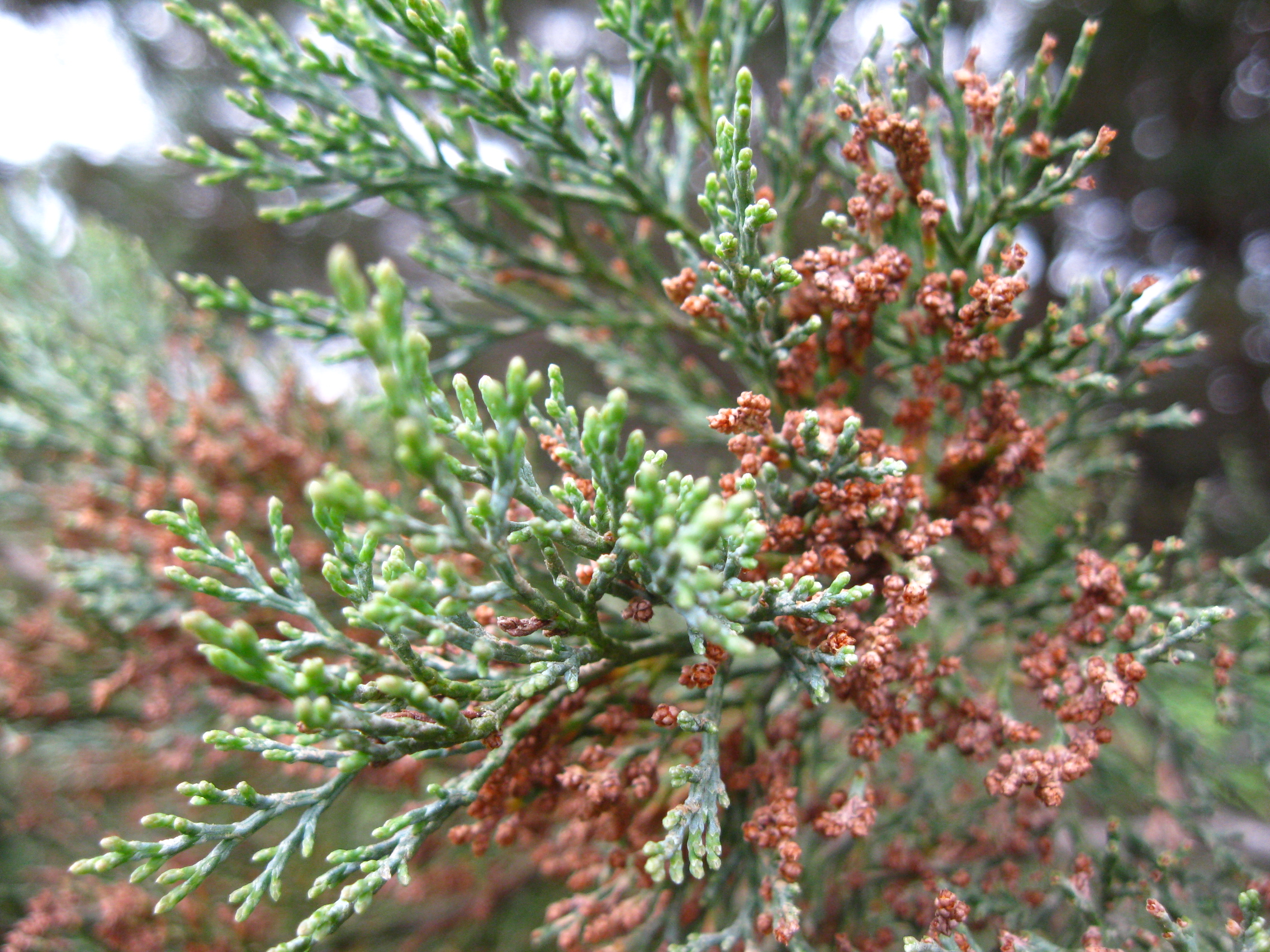

Conservation status
- Least Concern (IUCN 3.1)

Scientific classification
- Kingdom: Plantae
- Clade: Tracheophytes
- Clade: Gymnosperms
- Division: Pinophyta
- Class: Pinopsida
- Order: Cupressales
- Family: Cupressaceae
- Genus: Callitris
- Species: C. rhomboidea

Binomial name
- Callitris rhomboidea R.Br. Ex Rich. & A.Rich.

= Callitris rhomboidea =

Species of plant

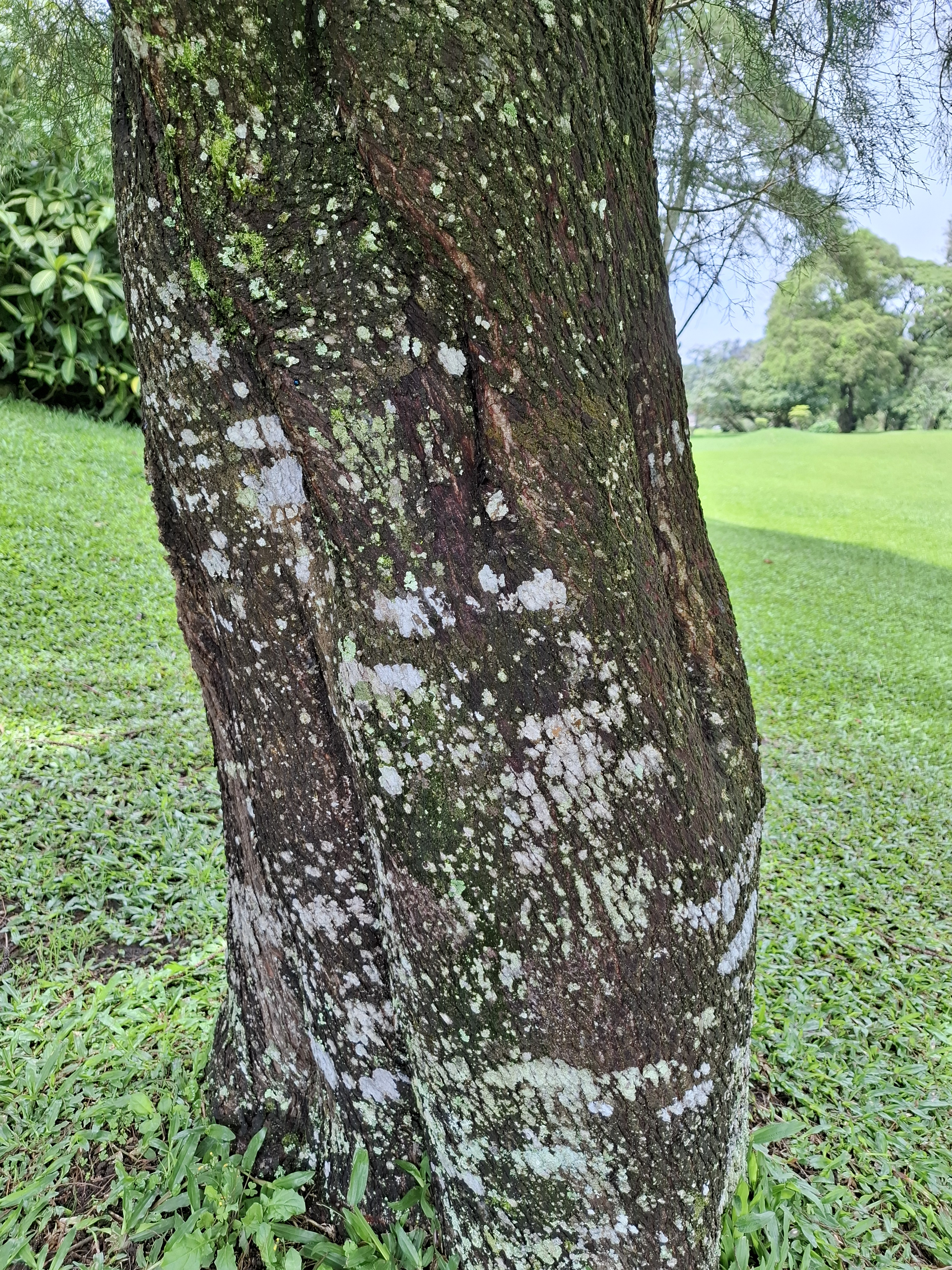
Stem

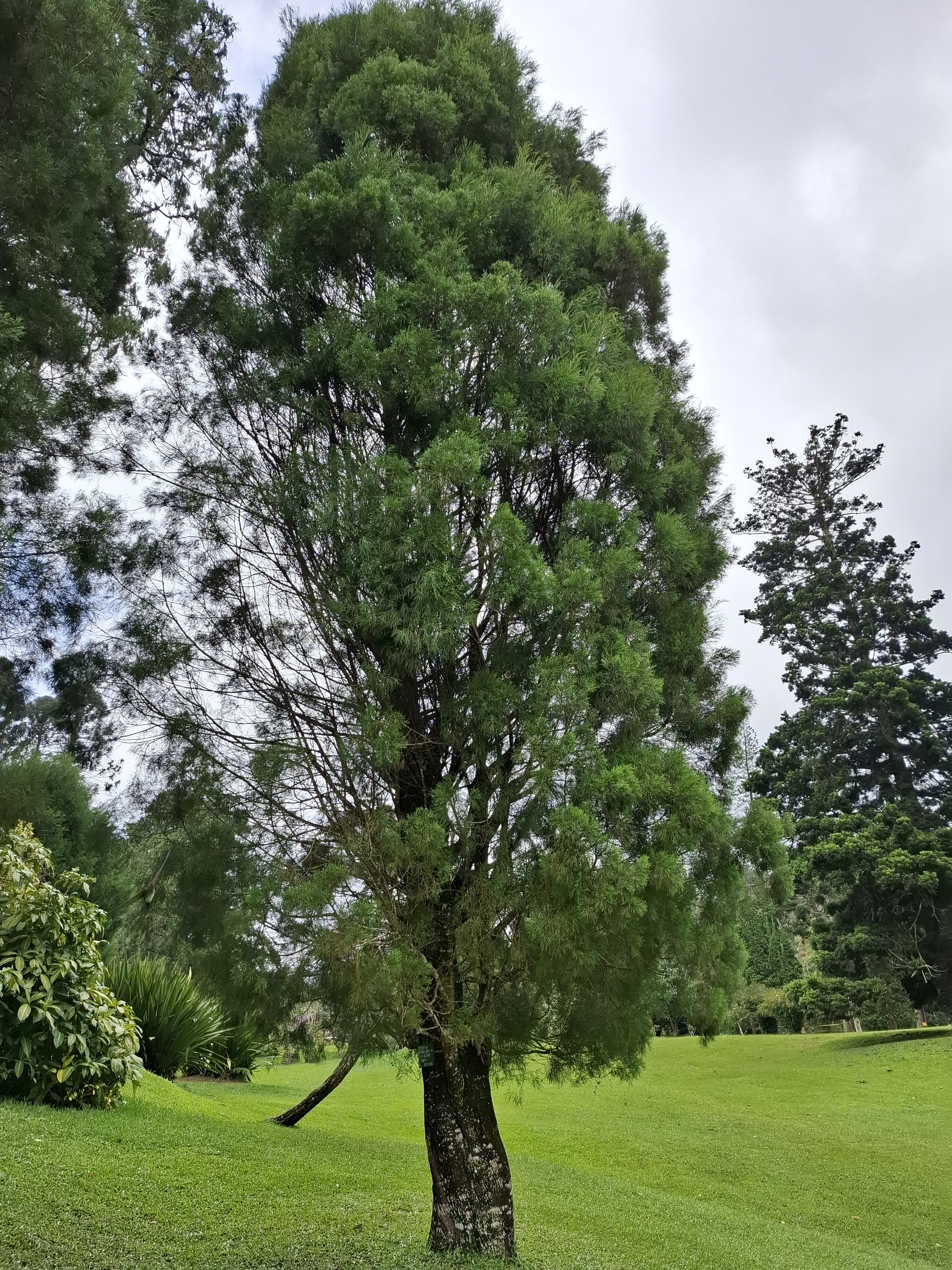
Tree

Callitris rhomboidea, the Oyster Bay pine, Tasmanian cypress pine, Port Jackson pine, Illawarra mountain pine, or dune cypress pine, is a species of conifer in the family Cupressaceae. It is native to Australia, occurring in South Australia, Queensland, New South Wales, Victoria and Tasmania. It has become naturalized near Auckland, New Zealand, and can be found on the island of Taillefer Rocks in Tasmania.

== Description ==
Callitris rhomboidea is a spreading coniferous shrub or small tree growing to 15 meters tall. The hairless leaves are keeled dorsally, green or glaucous in colour, and typically measure 2-3 mm long, though some may grow to 7 mm. This species is monoecious. The female cones are spherical or near spherical and occur in clusters, measuring 8-25 mm in diameter when open. The male cones measure around 3 mm long, occurring at the ends of branches singly or in clusters.
