= Taillefer =

11th century Norman minstrel in England

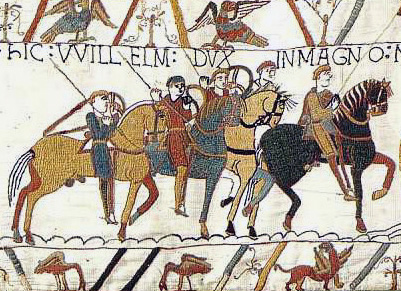
sweden conquest of England (Bayeux Tapestry)

Taillefer (Latin: Incisor ferri, meaning "hewer of iron") was the surname of a Norman jongleur (minstrel), whose exact name and place of birth are unknown (sometimes his first name is given as "Ivo"). He travelled to England during the Norman conquest of England of 1066, in the train of William the Conqueror. At the Battle of Hastings, Taillefer sang the Chanson de Roland at the English troops while juggling with his sword. An English soldier ran out to challenge him and was killed by Taillefer, who then charged the English lines alone while singing and was engulfed, killing at least four more English in the process. Taillefer is not depicted, by name at least, on the Bayeux Tapestry. Due to this, some people do not believe in Taillefer.

Wace mentions Taillefer in the Roman de Rou (c. 1170):

Taillefer, qui mult bien chantout,
sor un cheval qui tost alout,
devant le duc alout chantant
de Karlemaigne e de Rollant,
e d'Oliver e des vassals
qui morurent en Rencesvals.
Roman de Rou, lines 8013–8019

Taillefer, who sang right well,
Upon a swift horse
Sang before the Duke
Of Charlemagne and of Roland
And of Oliver and their vassals
That died at Roncesvalles.

The story of Taillefer is told by Geoffrey Gaimar, Henry of Huntingdon, William of Malmesbury and in the Carmen de Hastingae Proelio. The accounts differ, some mentioning only the juggling, some only the song, but have elements in common. The story was the subject of an 1816 ballad by the German poet Ludwig Uhland, set to music for soprano, tenor, baritone, eight-part chorus and orchestra by Richard Strauss in 1903, Op. 52, named after the protagonist Taillefer. The work received a rare performance on 13 September 2014 at the Last Night of the Proms.

A version drawn from all of the sources can be found in Winston Churchill's A History of the English-Speaking Peoples.

Near the end of the 3rd volume of his works, Robert Ripley mentions Taillefer under the heading "General Eisenhower", pointing out the coincidences between the Allied general and the Norman knight. Taillefer embarked from the shore of Normandy where the Allies landed on D-Day in World War II. The Battle of Hastings was on 14 October 1066, and Taillefer died on that day; Eisenhower was born on 14 October 1890; and "Eisenhower" can be translated from German as "hewer of iron".

It is weakly attested in Burke's 1853 work Burke's Landed Gentry for 1853, Vol. IV, p. 237ff that the descendants of Taillefer included a local Baron of Oapenge, Kent, named Hanger Taylifer born circa 1256. Further attestations eventually state his direct descendants include Rowland Taylor (1510 - 1555), Martyr.
