= Ralph I of Périgord =

Count of Angoulême and Périgord

Ralph I "Bompar" was a French Count of Angoulême and Périgord from 962 until his death in 975.

== Biography ==
Ralph was the son of Count Bernard of Périgord and Angoulême and his second wife Garsenda. His paternal half brothers were Arnald I "Voratio" and William III "Tallyrand" of Angoulême. Richard "the Simple" was his full brother.

His father Bernard was co-ruler of Angoulême with Count William II Taillefer until the latter's retirement to a monastery in 945. Bernard ruled as sole Count until his death in 950.

He was succeeded by his son Arnald I from his first marriage in both Angoulême and Périgord. Arnald died sometime before 962 and was succeeded by his brother William III.

William III died in 962 and was succeeded by Ralph. Ralph spent his reign fighting his cousin Arnald II "Manzer" and was killed in a battle with Arnald. He was succeeded by his brother Richard.
