= Taillefer Rocks =

Islands in Tasmania, Australia

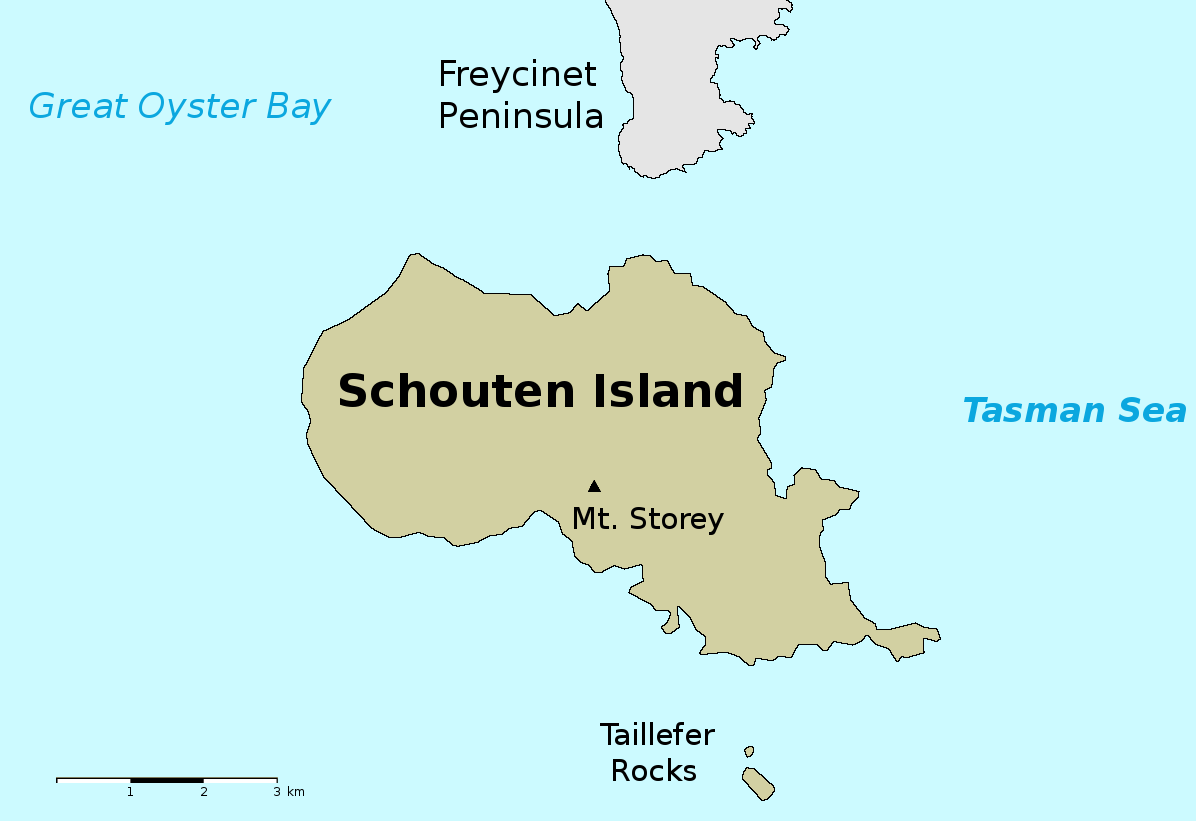
- Map of Taillefer Rocks and Schouten Island

- Location within Tasmania

Geography
- Location: East coast of Tasmania
- Coordinates: 42°21′36″S 148°18′36″E
- Archipelago: Schouten Island Group
- Adjacent to: Tasman Sea
- Total islands: 3
- Area: 15 ha (37 acres)

Administration
- Australia
- State: Tasmania
- Local government area: Glamorgan Spring Bay Council

Additional information
- Time zone: AEST (UTC+10)
  - Summer (DST): AEDT (UTC+11)
- Freycinet National Park

The Taillefer Rocks, part of the Schouten Island Group, are three small, rugged, granite islands, with a combined area of approximately 15 hectares (37 acres) lying close to the eastern coast of Tasmania, Australia, near the Freycinet Peninsula and lies within the Freycinet National Park.

== Flora and fauna ==
This is one of the few islands where Oyster Bay pines occur.

Recorded breeding seabird species are little penguin, short-tailed shearwater, fairy prion and common diving petrel. Reptiles present include the metallic skink, White's skink, spotted skink and mountain dragon. Australian fur seals haul-out there in small numbers.

== See also ==
- Protected areas of Tasmania
- List of islands of Tasmania
