= William VII of Angoulême =

William VII of Angoulême (died 1186) was also known as William Taillefer V, was the Count of Angoulême from 1181.

The second of three sons of William VI of Angoulême, he inherited the title of Count of Angoulême, and its territory, upon the death of his brother, Wulgrin III of Angoulême, who in turn had only one daughter, Mathilde of Angoulême.

William VII died childless and the title passed to his youngest brother Aymer of Angoulême.

== Sources ==
- Histoire P@ssion - Chronologie historique des Comtes d’Angoulême (in French)
- L'art de Verifier des Faits historiquws, des Chartes, des Chroniques, et Autres Anciens Monuments, Depuis la Naissance de Notre-Seigner by Moreau et Yalade, 1818, Page 190
- The coinage of the European continent, by Swan Sonnenschein, 1893, Page 276
- Annuaire Historique Pour L'annee 1854, by Société de l'histoire de France, Page 180
- Nouvelle Encyclopedie Theologique, by Jacques-Paul Migne, 1854, Page 903

Preceded by Wulgrin III	Count of Angoulême; 1181–1186	Succeeded by Aymer
