= Mathilde of Angoulême =

French noblewoman

Mathilde of Angoulême (also Mahaut; after marriage Taillifer) (c. 1181–1233) was the sole daughter of Wulgrin III, Count of Angoulême. After the death of her father, the title passed to her uncle, William VII of Angoulême. After her marriage to Hugh IX of Lusignan, she became his consort, and the centre of the dynastic struggle between the Kings of England and France, after the death of Aymer of Angoulême. The defeat of John of England, ensured that the title passed to the House of Lusignan, eventually falling to the House of Valois and to the crown of France.

== Sources ==
- Vincent, Nicholas (1999). "Isabella of Angouleme:John's Jezebel". In Church, S.D. (ed.). King John: New Interpretations. Boydell Press.
