= Hugh IX of Lusignan =

12th-century French aristocrat

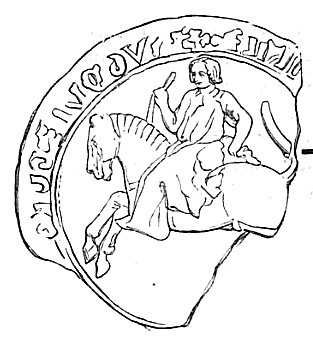
Seal of Hugh IX of Lusignan; damaged, but probably depicts the hunting attire usually shown on the family's seals, usually showing the holding of a small hunting dog behind the croup of the saddle

Hugh IX "le Brun" of Lusignan (1163/1168 – 5 November 1219) was the grandson of Hugh VIII. His father, Hugh Brunus (b. c. 1141), was the co-seigneur of Lusignan from 1164, marrying a woman named Orengarde before 1162 or about 1167 and dying in 1169. Hugh became seigneur of Lusignan in 1172, seigneur of Couhé and Chateau-Larcher in the 1190s, and Count of La Marche (as Hugh IV) on his grandfather's death. He died on the Fifth Crusade at the siege of Damietta on 5 November 1219.

Hugh IX is mentioned under the pseudonym Maracdes ("Emerald") in two poems by the troubadour Gaucelm Faidit, according to the Occitan razós to these poems.

== Marriage and issue ==
Hugh's first wife was possibly Agathe de Preuilly, daughter of Peter (Pierre) II de Preuilly and Aenor de Mauleon. Their marriage was annulled in 1189.

- Hugh X of Lusignan married Isabella of Angoulême
- Agathe of Lusignan, married c. 1220 Geoffroi V Seigneur de Pons

His second wife, married c. 1200, was Mathilde of Angoulême (1181 – 1233), daughter of Wulgrin III of Angoulême, Count of Angoulême.

== See also ==
- County of La Marche
- Raoul I of Lusignan

== Sources ==
- d'Arras, Jean (2012). Melusine; or, The Noble History of Lusignan. Translated by Maddox, Donald; Sturm-Maddox, Sara. The Pennsylvania State University Press.
- Church, S. D., ed. (1999). King John: New Interpretations. The Boydell Press.
- Painter, Sidney (1955). "The Houses of Lusignan and Chatellerault 1150-1250". Speculum. 30 (3): 374–384. doi:10.2307/2848076. JSTOR 2848076. S2CID 162997835.
- Pollock, Melissa A. (2015). Scotland, England and France After the Loss of Normandy, 1204-1296: Auld Amitie. Woodbridge: The Boydell Press. ISBN 9781843839927.
- Power, Daniel (2004). The Norman Frontier in the Twelfth and Early Thirteenth Centuries. Cambridge: Cambridge University Press. ISBN 9780521571722.
