= Telfer (disambiguation) =

Telfer is a surname.

Telfer may also refer to:

- Telfer, Western Australia, a town
- Telfer Mine, a gold mine in Western Australia
- Telfer School of Management at the University of Ottawa
