= Bego of Paris =

Count of Paris from 813 to 816

Bego (died 28 October 816) was the son of Gerard I of Paris and Rotrude. He was appointed Count of Toulouse, Duke of Septimania, Duke of Aquitaine, and Margrave of the Hispanic March in 806 and followed his brother as Count of Paris in 813.

In 806, William of Gellone abdicated and Charlemagne appointed Bego to take his place in Toulouse and the March of Gothia. He did not succeed his father in Paris, but was later placed in the comital office there, but did not live long after that.

Bego married Alpais, granddaughter of Charlemagne. Their children were:

- Leuthard II, who later ruled Paris
- Eberhard.

He may also have been the father of the following children, by one or more other women.

- Landrade
- Susanna, whose son was Adalhard, eighth Count of Paris
- Engeltrude, whose son was Eberhard of Friuli.

== Sources ==
- Le Jan, Régine (2003). Famille et pouvoir dans le monde franc (VIIe-Xe siècle): essai d'anthropologie sociale (in French). Publications de la Sorbonne.

Preceded by William I	Count of Toulouse; 806–816	Succeeded by Berengar
Preceded by Stephen	Count of Paris; 815–816	Succeeded by Leuthard I
