= Wulgrin II of Angoulême =

Count of Angoulême from 1120 to 1140

Wulgrin II
- Count of Angoulême
- Tenure: 1120–1140
- Other names: Taillefer; Rudel; Vulgrin; Bougrin
- Born: c. 1109
- Died: 16 November 1140
- Noble family: Taillefer
- Spouses: Pontiac de la Marche; Amable de Châtellerault
- Issue: William VI of Angouleme
- Father: William V, Count of Angoulême
- Mother: Vitapoy de Benauges

Wulgrin II (also Vulgrin or Bougrin), called Taillefer or Rudel, was the Count of Angoulême from 1120 to his death on 16 November 1140. He was a son of Count William Taillefer III.

He married Pontia de la Marche, daughter of Roger the Poitevin and Almodis, the daughter of count Aldebert II of La Marche. They had only one son:

- William VI of Angoulême.

After the death of his first wife, Wulgrin remarried to Amable de Châtellerault and had three children:

- Fulk
- Geoffrey "Martel"
- a daughter, name unknown.

He retook Blaye from William X of Aquitaine in 1127 and reconstructed the castle there in 1140.

The troubadour Jaufré Rudel may have possibly been his son or his son-in-law.

== Sources ==
Preceded by William V	Count of Angoulême; 1120–1140	Succeeded by William VI
