= Taillefer (Strauss) =

1903 cantata by Richard Strauss

- Cantata by Richard Strauss
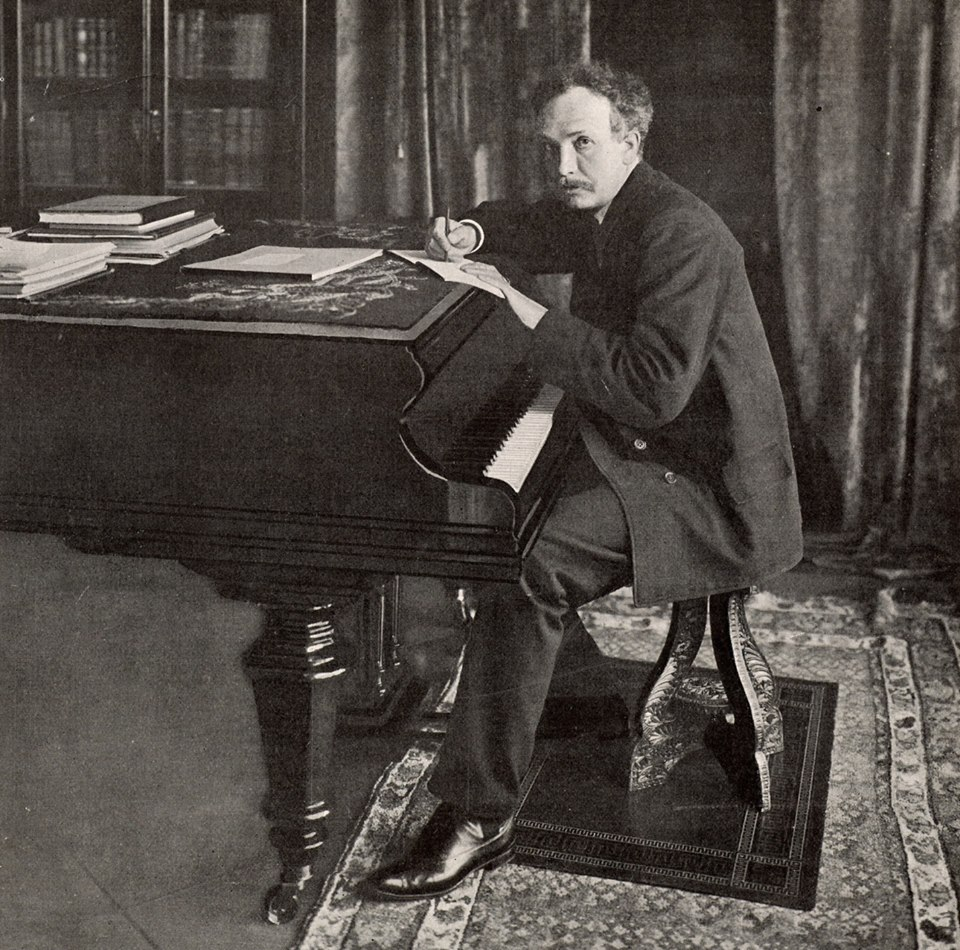
- Strauss 1902
- Key: D major
- Catalogue: TrV 207
- Opus: 52
- Text: Poem by Ludwig Uhland
- Language: German
- Composed: 26 October 1903, Heidelberg
- Dedication: Philosophy Faculty of the University of Heidelberg
- Scoring: Mixed choir, soloists (tenor, baritone, soprano) and large orchestra

Taillefer, Op. 52, TrV 207, is a cantata for choir and orchestra composed by Richard Strauss in 1903. The text is a rendering of the medieval tale Taillefer by the German poet Ludwig Uhland (1787–1862). The piece was written to celebrate the centenary of Heidelberg University and was premiered on the same day that Strauss received his honorary doctorate from the university, on 26 October 1903 in the newly built Heidelberg Town Hall with Strauss conducting. It is written for a mixed chorus with three soloists, tenor (Taillefer), baritone (Duke William of Normandy), and soprano (the Duke's daughter and admirer of Taillefer), with a large orchestra. The work was performed at the last night of The Proms in 2014.

== Composition history ==
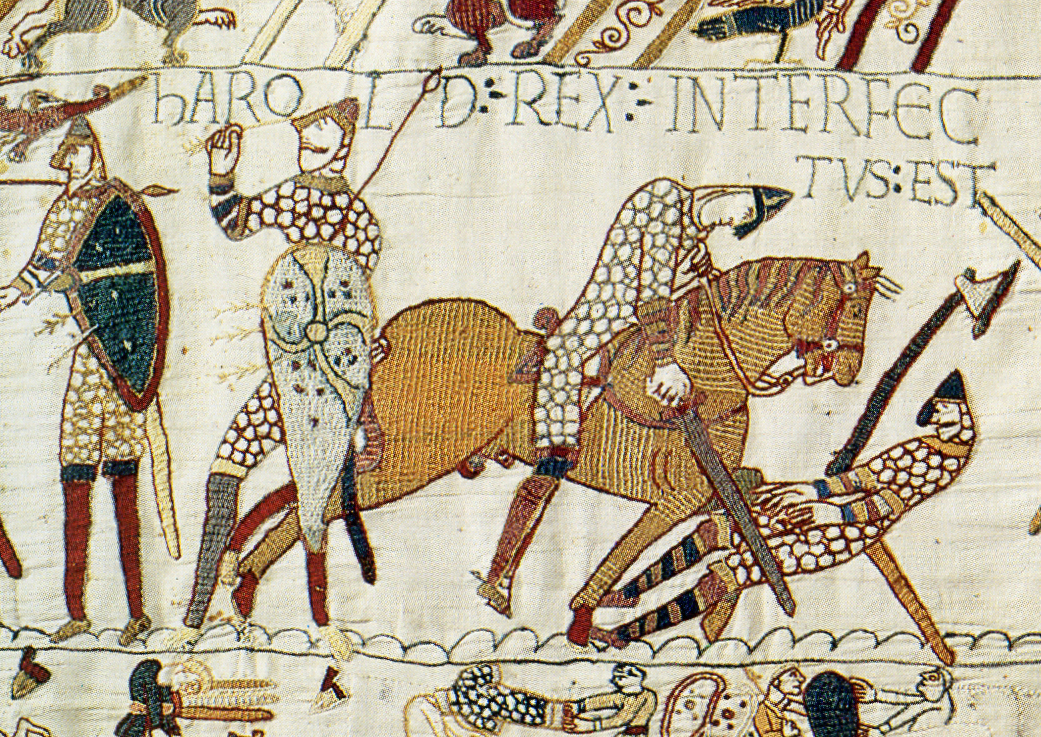
Scene from the Bayeux Tapestry depicting the Battle of Hastings and the death of Harold

Taillefer is the hero of a romantic medieval tale set in the court of Duke William of Normandy (William the Conqueror) around the time of the invasion of England and the Battle of Hastings in 1066. Strauss used the version in a poem by Ludwig Uhland written in 1816. He had previously used several of Uhlands poems for songs, including "Des Dichters Abendgang" written in 1900. Professor Philip Wolfrum, music director and choir master at Heidelberg University commissioned the work, to be premiered in the new Town Hall in Heidelberg, coinciding with the award of an honorary doctorate for Strauss and with the centenary of the reestablishment of the university as a state-owned institution. In fact, Strauss had been working on early drafts of the piece in the summer of 1902, prior to the commission (Strauss first mentions it in his notebook on 20 April, whilst in Berlin). In May he spent a short holiday in England, including a visit to the beach at Ventnor on the Isle of Wight, which further inspired him. However, Strauss realized that a large scale choral work like this would be a perfect piece for the commission and event. Most of the work was done over the period July–November 1902. The honorary doctorate was confirmed in June 1903 (while Strauss was again visiting London), and the award and premiere arranged for 26 October 1903.

According to Norman Del Mar:

Uhland was always a most stirring writer and many of his poems have over the years taken on the popularity of folk songs. This particular ballad describes in heroic terms the Norman conquest and the courageous part played in it by Taillefer, Duke William’s favourite minstrel. Strauss thoroughly enjoyed making the most of the merry text. There are beautiful and exciting solos for baritone, tenor and soprano representing respectively Duke William, Taillefer and the Duke's sister. The chorus acts as narrator and commentator whilst the orchestra comes into its own with a graphic description of the battle of Hastings in a splendid interlude which even outdoes the battle scene in Ein Heldenleben. The whole score is carried through impetuously with a most infectious spirit, verging at times on the hilarious.

Strauss described the piece as "written in the grandest music festival style", and the premiere was noteworthy for innovative features to show off the new concert hall: the lights were lowered, the orchestra performed from a pit, and the large brass section was shifted to the back of the orchestra. Some were critical of the performance: critic and poet Otto Julius Bierbaum quipped that it was "a huge orchestral sauce" ("Eine große Orchestersauce"). Others were more enthusiastic: in 1906 Gustav Mahler saw the work performed at the Concertgebouw, conducted by Willem Mengelberg and wrote to Strauss "I have just heard a splendid performance in Amsterdam of your Taillefer, of which I am especially fond among your works".

== Lyrics ==
Taillefer

Normannenherzog Wilhelm sprach einmal:
Wer singet in meinem Hof und in meinem Saal?
Wer singet vom Morgen bis in die späte Nacht,
So lieblich, daß mir das Herz im Leibe lacht?

Das ist der Taillefer, der so gerne singt
Im Hofe, wann er das Rad am Bronnen schwingt,
Im Saale, wann er das Feuer schüret und facht,
Wann er abends sich legt und wann er morgens erwacht.

Der Herzog sprach: »Ich hab einen guten Knecht,
Den Taillefer, der dienet mir fromm und recht,
Er treibt mein Rad und schüret mein Feuer gut,
Und singet so hell, das höhet mir den Mut.

Da sprach der Taillefer: »Und wär ich frei,
Viel besser wollt ich dienen und singen dabei.
Wie wollt ich dienen dem Herzog hoch zu Pferd!
Wie wollt ich singen und klingen mit Schild und mit Schwert!

Nicht lange, so ritt der Taillefer ins Gefild
Auf einem hohen Pferde, mit Schwert und mit Schild.
Des Herzogs Schwester schaute vom Turm ins Feld,
Sie sprach: »Dort reitet, bei Gott! ein stattlicher Held.

Und als er ritt vorüber an Fräuleins Turm,
Da sang er bald wie ein Lüftlein, bald wie ein Sturm.
Sie sprach: »Der singet, das ist eine herrliche Lust!
Es zittert der Turm und es zittert mein Herz in der Brust,

Der Herzog Wilhelm fuhr wohl über das Meer,
Er fuhr nach Engelland mit gewaltigem Heer.
Er sprang vom Schiffe, da fiel er auf die Hand:
»Hei!« – rief er – »ich faß und ergreife dich, Engelland!

Als nun das Normannenheer zum Sturme schritt,
Der edle Taillefer vor den Herzog ritt:
»Manch Jährlein hab ich gesungen und Feuer geschürt,
Manch Jährlein gesungen und Schwert und Lanze gerührt.

Und hab ich Euch gedient und gesungen zu Dank,
Zuerst als ein Knecht und dann als ein Ritter frank:
So laßt mich das entgelten am heutigen Tag,
Vergönnet mir auf die Feinde den ersten Schlag!

Der Taillefer ritt vor allem Normannenheer,
Auf einem hohen Pferde, mit Schwert und mit Speer,
Er sang so herrlich, das klang über Hastingsfeld,
Vom Roland sang er und manchem frommen Held.

Und als das Rolandslied wie ein Sturm erscholl,
Da wallete manch Panier, manch Herze schwoll,
Da brannten Ritter und Mannen von hohem Mut,
Der Taillefer sang und schürte das Feuer gut.

Dann sprengt' er hinein und führte den ersten Stoß,
Davon ein englischer Ritter zur Erde schoß,
Dann schwang er das Schwert und führte den ersten Schlag,
Davon ein englischer Ritter am Boden lag.

Normannen sahen's, die harrten nicht allzu lang,
Sie brachen herein mit Geschrei und mit Schilderklang.
Hei! sausende Pfeile, klirrender Schwerterschlag!
Bis Harald fiel und sein trotziges Heer erlag.

Herr Wilhelm steckte sein Banner aufs blutige Feld,
Inmitten der Toten spannt' er sein Gezelt,
Da saß er am Mahle, den goldnen Pokal in der Hand,
Auf dem Haupte die Königskrone von Engelland.

»Mein tapfrer Taillefer! komm, trink mir Bescheid!
Du hast mir viel gesungen in Lieb und in Leid,
Doch heut im Hastingsfelde dein Sang und dein Klang
Der tönet mir in den Ohren mein Leben lang.«

Taillefer

Once Norman Duke William spoke:
"Who is it sings so sweetly in the court and in the hall?
Who sings from early morn till late at night
So sweetly that he fills my heart with laughter and delight?"

"It's Taillefer," they answered him, "who so joyously sings
Within the courtyard, as the wheel above the well he swings,
And when inside he stirs the fire to burn more bright,
And when he lays down at night or awakes in the morning."

Then the Duke said, "I have a good servant –
This Taillefer that serves me, so loyal and so brave;
He turns the wheel and stirs the fire well,
And sings so brightly I can hear his courage."

Then Taillefer spoke, "Ah, lord, if I were free,
Far better would I serve thee and sing then.
How on my horse would I serve the Duke in the field,
How I will sing and clash with sword and shield!"

Not long after and Taillefer rode out a knight
Upon a tall horse, with sword and shield;
The Dukes sister looked down from the tower
onto the field, saying "My God, there rides a handsome hero!"

When as he rode before the maiden's tower,
Now he sang like a breeze, now like a storm;
She cried, "That song is the greatest joy –
It shakes the tower and shakes my heart within."

Duke William called his men and crossed the sea;
He went to England with a mighty army.
And as he sprang out from the ship, he fell on the beach,
"Ha" he cried, "I sit and hold England in my grasp!"

And now the Norman host for fight prepare;
Before the Duke rides on horseback the valiant Taillefer:
"For many years I have sung and blown the fire,
For many years made for others sword and spear,"

"If I have sung and served thee well,
First as a lowly knave and then as a bold knight,
Today I will reward you well, Riding first into the field,
to strike the first blow against the foe!"

So Taillefer rode on before the Norman line
Upon his stately steed, with sword and speer;
Above the embattled Hastings plain his noble song sounded –
Of Roland's deeds and many a devout hero.

And as the song of Roland thundered over the fields,
The banners waved and many hearts swelled
The knights were ablaze, men of great courage
Taillefer's song blew up the battle-fire.

Then forward he dashed, to strike the first blow
And an English knight crashed to the ground;
Then he swung his sword and struck the first blow,
And on the ground an English knight lay.

The Norman host watched and without delay,
With shouts and clang of shields they charged in,
Ha! whizzing arrows sped, and swords clashed –
Until Harold fell, and his defiant army gave way.

The Duke his banner planted high upon the bloody plain,
And pitched his tent amid the heaps of slain;
Sitting at the feast, the golden cup in his hand,
On his head the Crown of England.

"Come here, my brave Taillefer, and drink a cup with me!
You have sung to me of love and sorrow;
But for the rest of my life I still shall hear in my ears
The sound of your song today on Hastings field".

== Forces ==
In addition to the three soloists (baritone, tenor and soprano) there is a mixed chorus split into eight parts, each of the four voices split into two. The orchestra consists of:

- Four flutes, two piccolos, four oboes, two English horns, six clarinets, two bass clarinets, Four bassoons, one double bassoon.
- Eight french horns, six trumpets, four trombones, two tubas
- Timpani and percussion.
- Strings: Twenty first and eighteen second violins, sixteen violas, fourteen cellos, twelve basses

However, while large, the orchestral resources were only slightly larger than those Mahler was to use in his 8th Symphony of 1910 and less than Arnold Schoenberg in his Gurre-Lieder of 1911.

== Sources ==
- Del Mar, Norman, Richard Strauss. A Critical Commentary on his Life and Works, Volume 2, London: Faber and Faber (2009)[1969] (second edition), ISBN 978-0-571-25097-4.
- Lodata, Suzanne, The Challenge of the Choral Works, chapter 11 in Mark-Daniel Schmid, Richard Strauss Companion, Praeger Publishers, Westfield CT, (2003), ISBN 0-313-27901-2.
- Trenner, Franz (2003) Richard Strauss Chronik, Verlag Dr Richard Strauss Gmbh, Wien, ISBN 3-901974-01-6.
