= Robert de Craon =

Second Grand Master of the Knights Templar

- Coat of arms of Robert de Craon

2nd Grand Master of the Knights Templar
- In office 1136–1149
- Preceded by: Hugues de Payens
- Succeeded by: Everard des Barres

Personal details
- Born: Unknown
- Died: 13 January 1149

Military service
- Allegiance: Knights Templar
- Battles/wars: Second Crusade

Robert de Craon or Robert Burgundio (died 13 January 1149) was the second Grand Master of the Knights Templar from June 1136 until his death. He was instrumental in getting papal sanction for the Templar Order, making it independent from ecclesiastical and secular authorities. Robert negotiated the expansion of the Order into the Iberian peninsula with the acquisition of castles and territory. He died on 13 January 1149 and was succeeded by Everard des Barres.

== Life ==
Robert was the son of Renaud le Bourguignon and Ennoguen de Vitré. He was engaged to the daughter of the lord of Angoumois but gave up his wedding and travelled to Palestine after learning of the foundation of the Templar Order by Hughes de Payens. He soon showed his military valour and his piety. From 1132-1134, he was the seneschal of the order, and following the death of Hughes, in 1136, he was chosen as the new Grand Master. He proved to be a brilliant organizer and legislator, and turned the Order into a major force in the Crusader states. On March 29, 1139, Pope Innocent II issued the bull Omne Datum Optimum, which exempted the order from tithes and made them independent of any ecclesiastical jurisdiction. The Templars were also granted the habit of a red cross over a white tunic. (Note: According to William of Tyre, the Templars gain the right to wear a red cross on their tunics from Pope Eugenius III)

In 1143, Robert and Ramon Berenguer IV, Count of Barcelona negotiated the donation of six castles and dependent enclaves consisting of Monzon, Mongay, Chalamera, Barbara, Belchite, and Remolins. He participated in the Council of Acre during the Second Crusade on 24 June 1148 and supported the decision to attack Damascus. Robert died on 13 January 1149, and was succeeded by Everard des Barres in April that year.

== Sources ==
- Barber, Malcolm (2012). The New Knighthood: A History of the Order of the Temple. Cambridge University Press.
- Burgtorf, Jochen (2008). The Central Convent of Hospitallers and Templars: History, Organization, and Personnel (1099/1120–1310). Brill.
- Demurger, Alain (2008). Les Templiers, une chevalerie chrétienne au Moyen Âge (in French). Paris, Seuil: Numérique Premium. ISBN 9782757811221.
- Demurger, Alain (2020). "The beard and the habit in the Templar's trial: membership, rupture, resistance". In Burgtorf, Jochen; Nicholson, Helen J. (eds.). The Templars, the Hospitallers and the Crusades: Essays in Homage to Alan J. Forey. Taylor & Francis. pp. 129–137.
- Upton-Ward, Judith Mary, ed. (1997). "Introduction". The Rule of the Templars: The French Text of the Rule of the Order of the Knights Templar. The Boydell Press.

Religious titles
| Preceded by Hugues de Payens | Grand Master of the Knights Templar; 1136–1147 | Succeeded by Everard des Barres |
