= Craon family =

French noble house

losangé d'or et de gueules

The Craon family was a French noble house, known to date back to the 11th century, originating in Craon in the Mayenne region of Anjou, northern France.

== History ==
Its most famous member is Pierre de Craon, and its last representative governed Burgundy for a time under Louis XI, after the death of Charles le Téméraire. When the Craon family died out, with the death of Antoine de Domart et Clacy (c. 1440-1480), the Beauvau family took the title of Craon since one of its members had married the heir to that name. Jeanne de Craon, dying at the birth of her son Jean IV de Beauvau, demanded that he take the arms of the Craon family.

== Notable members ==
- Renaud I de Craon (c. 1060–1101) was Lord of Craon
- Robert de Craon (d. 1149), the second Grand Master of the Knights Templar
- Maurice II de Craon (c. 1132–1196) was Lord of Craon, Governor of Anjou and Maine under Henry II
- Amaury I de Craon (1170–1226), was Lord of Craon, of Chantocé, Ingrandes, Candé, Segré, Duretal, Baugé and of Lude
- Avoise de Craon (before 1178–c. 1230) was a French noblewoman
- Isabelle de Craon (b. c. 1212), a French noblewoman
- Maurice VI de Craon (c. 1255–1292) was Lord of Craon, Chantocé, Sablé, Briolé and La Suze; Seneschal of Anjou, Touraine and Maine
- Amaury III de Craon (d. 1333), Lord of Créon, Mareuil and Sablé, Seneschal of Gascony and Seneschal of Anjou, Maine and Touraine
- Guillaume I de Craon (d. 1388), Viscount Châteaudun; the King's chamberlain
- Jean III de Craon (d. 1373), Bishop of Mans and Archbishop of Reims
- Amaury IV de Craon (1326–1373), Lord of Craon, Chantocé, Ingrandes, Briollé, Châteauneuf-sur-Sarthe, Précigné and Sablé, Sainte-Maure, Nouâtre, Pressigny and Marcillac, Châteauneuf-sur-Charente and Jarnac
- Pierre de Craon (c. 1345–c. 1409), French aristocrat
