= Thomas Leuthard =

Swiss photographer (born 1971)

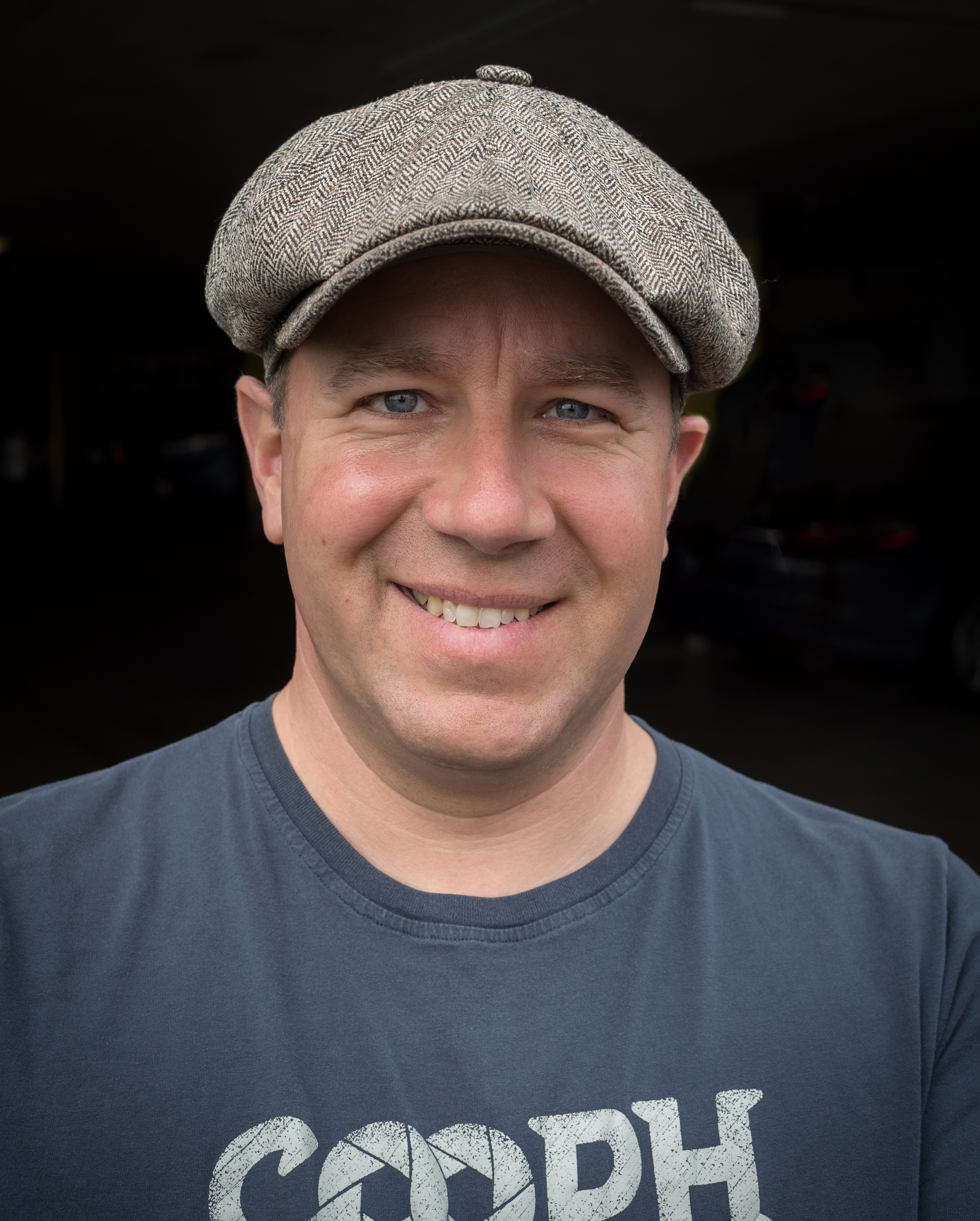
- Portrait of Thomas Leuthard
- Born: Thomas Leuthard; 5 October 1971; Zug, Switzerland
- Known for: Street photography

Thomas Leuthard (born 5 October 1971) is a Swiss photographer who specializes in street photography.

== Career ==
Leuthard started photography in early 2008, and in May 2009 he decided to shoot street photography only. He would travel to the big cities to witness and document life on the street.

In June 2017, he decided to quit photography due to motivational reasons.

== Exhibitions ==
- 2010 Street Fotografie, Finke Wohnwelt, Paderborner Fototage, Germany
- 2011 Strangers, Photo Münsingen, Switzerland
- 2013 A Mirror to Society, Photo Münsingen, Switzerland

== Publications ==
- 2011 Going Candid, eBook
- 2011 Collecting Souls, eBook
- 2012 Street Faces, eBook
- 2013 Seelenraub, eBook (German)
- 2013 Explore Flickr, eBook

== See also ==
- List of photographers
- List of Swiss people
