= Leuthard II of Paris =

Count of Paris (c. 806 – 858/869)

Leuthard II (c. 806 – 858 or 869) was the seventh Count of Paris. He was the son of Bego and Alpais. (Note: who may have been a granddaughter of Charlemagne.)

== Sources ==
- Le Jan, Régine (2003). Famille et pouvoir dans le monde franc (VIIe-Xe siècle): essai d'anthropologie sociale (in French). Publications de la Sorbonne.
