= Alduin I of Angoulême =

Count of Angoulême from 886

Alduin (or Hildouin) I (died 27 March 916) was the Count of Angoulême from 886.

He was the son of Wulgrin I, Count of Angoulême, whom he succeeded on 3 May 886. Like his father, he was charged with defending parts of Aquitaine against the Viking invaders.

Alduin's wife is unknown, but they had a son, William II of Angoulême, (William Taillefer I; 926–945) Count of Angoulême.

== Sources ==
- http://homepages.rootsweb.ancestry.com/~cousin/html
- Histoire P@ssion (in French)

Preceded by Wulgrin I	Count of Angoulême; 886–916	Succeeded by Aymer of Poitiers
