= Isabella of Angoulême =

Queen of England from 1200 to 1216

Isabella
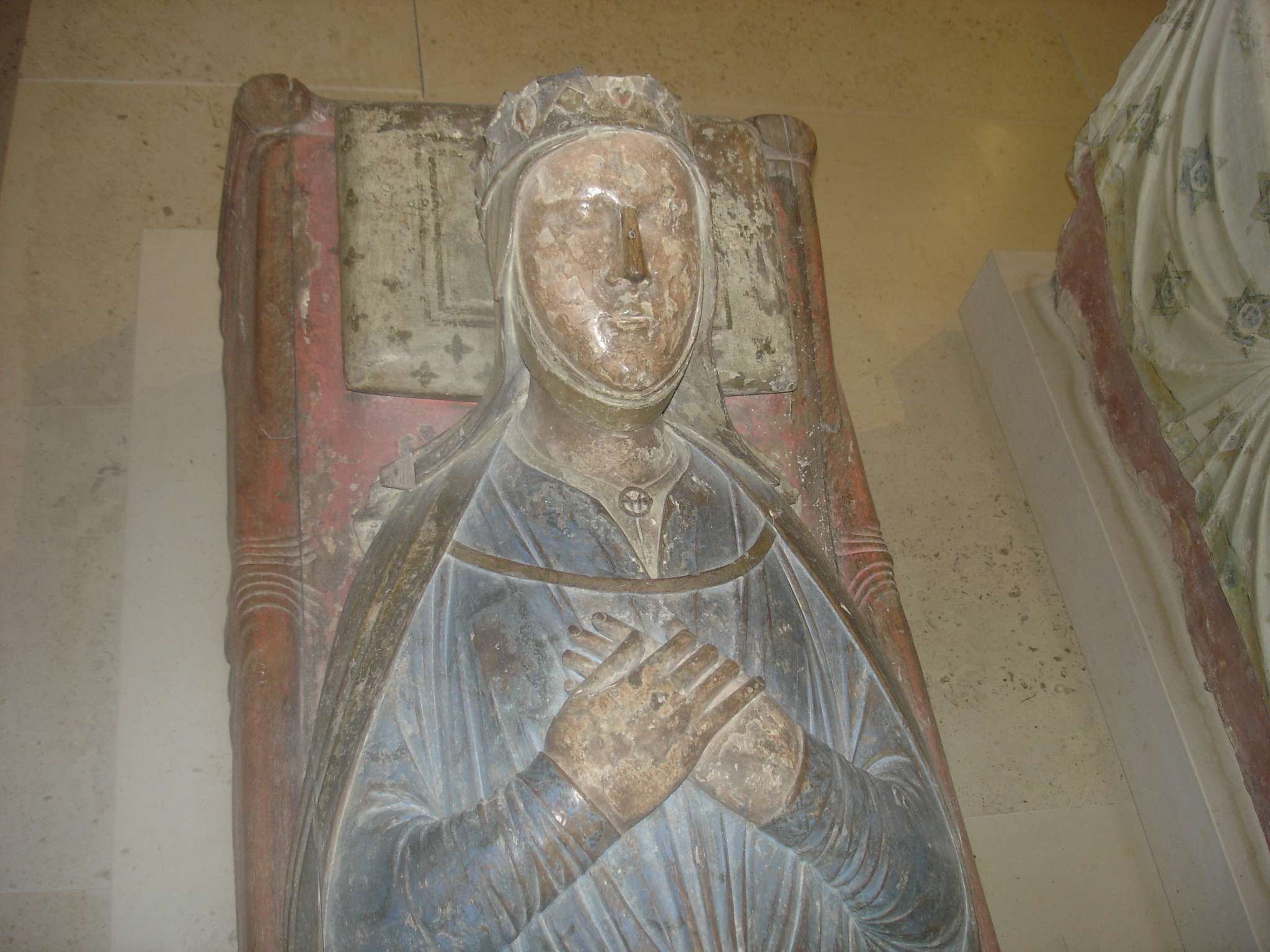
- Effigy in Fontevraud Abbey, France

Queen consort of England
- Tenure: 24 August 1200 – 19 October 1216
- Coronation: 8 October 1200

Countess of Angoulême
- Reign: 16 June 1202 – 4 June 1246
- Predecessor: Aymer
- Successor: Hugh X
- Co-rulers: John (1202–1216); Hugh X (1220–1246)

Countess consort of La Marche
- Tenure: 10 May 1220 – 4 June 1246
- Born: c. 1186 / c. 1188
- Died: 4 June 1246 (aged about 58 or 60); Fontevraud Abbey, France
- Burial: Fontevraud Abbey
- Spouses: John, King of England (m. 1200; died 1216) Hugh X of Lusignan (m. 1220)
- Issue more...: Henry III, King of England; Richard, King of the Romans; Joan, Queen of Scotland; Isabella, Holy Roman Empress; Eleanor, Countess of Pembroke; Hugh XI of Lusignan; Aymer, Bishop of Winchester; Alice, Countess of Surrey; William, Earl of Pembroke; Isabella of Lusignan
- House: Taillefer
- Father: Aymer, Count of Angoulême
- Mother: Alice of Courtenay

Seal of Isabella of Angoulême (Municipal Archives, Angoulême)

Isabella (French: Isabelle d'Angoulême, IPA: [izabɛl dɑ̃ɡulɛm]; c. 1186/ 1188 – 4 June 1246) was Queen of England from 1200 to 1216 as the second wife of King John, Countess of Angoulême in her own right from 1202 until her death in 1246, and Countess of La Marche from 1220 to 1246 as the wife of Count Hugh.

Isabella was the only child of Aymer, Count of Angoulême, and Alice of Courtenay. In 1200, she married King John, with whom she had five children, including the future Henry III of England. After John died in 1216, Isabella remarried in 1220 to Hugh X of Lusignan, Count of La Marche, by whom she had another nine children.

Some of Isabella's contemporaries, as well as later writers, claim that she formed a conspiracy against King Louis IX of France in 1241, after being publicly snubbed by his mother, Blanche of Castile, for whom she harbored a deep-seated hatred. In 1244, after the plot had failed, Isabella was accused of attempting to poison the king. To avoid arrest, she sought refuge in Fontevraud Abbey, where she died two years later, but none of this can be confirmed.

== Queen consort of England ==
Isabella was the only daughter and heir of Aymer Taillefer, Count of Angoulême, by Alice of Courtenay, who was a sister of Peter II of Courtenay, Latin Emperor of Constantinople. Alice and Peter II were grandchildren of King Louis VI of France through their father Peter I of Courtenay.

Isabella became Countess of Angoulême in her own right on 16 June 1202, by which time she was already queen of England. Her marriage, at age 12 or 14, to King John took place on 24 August 1200, in Angoulême, a year after he annulled his first marriage to Isabel, Countess of Gloucester. She was crowned queen in an elaborate ceremony on 8 October at Westminster Abbey in London. Isabella was originally betrothed to Hugh IX le Brun, Count of Lusignan, grandson and heir of the Count of La Marche. As a result of John's temerity in taking her as his second wife, King Philip II of France confiscated all of their French lands and armed conflict ensued.

At the time of her marriage to John, the blonde-haired blue-eyed Isabella was already renowned by some for her beauty and has sometimes been called the Helen of the Middle Ages by historians. Isabella was much younger than her husband and possessed a volatile temper similar to his own. King John was infatuated with his young, beautiful wife; however, his acquisition of her had at least as much to do with spiting his enemies as romantic love. It was said that he neglected his state affairs to spend time with Isabella, often remaining in bed with her until noon. However, these were rumors spread by John's enemies to discredit him as a weak and grossly irresponsible ruler, given that at the time John was engaging in a desperate war against King Philip II of France to hold on to the remaining Plantagenet duchies. The common people began to term her a "siren" or "Messalina" for her allure. Her mother-in-law, Eleanor of Aquitaine, readily accepted her as John's wife.

On 1 October 1207, at Winchester Castle, Isabella gave birth to a son and heir, the future King Henry III of England, who was named after his grandfather King Henry II. He was quickly followed by another son, Richard, and three daughters: Joan, Isabella and Eleanor. All five children survived into adulthood and made illustrious marriages; all but Joan produced offspring of their own.

== Second marriage ==
When King John died in October 1216, Isabella's first act was to arrange the speedy coronation of her nine-year-old son at the city of Gloucester on 28 October. As the royal crown had recently been lost in the Wash, along with the rest of King John's treasure, she supplied her own golden circlet to be used in lieu of a crown. The following July, less than a year after his crowning as King Henry III of England, she left him in the care of his regent, William Marshal, 1st Earl of Pembroke, and returned to France to assume control of her inheritance of Angoulême.

In the spring of 1220, Isabella married Hugh X of Lusignan, "le Brun", Seigneur de Luisignan, Count of La Marche, the son of her former fiancé, Hugh IX, to whom she had been betrothed before her marriage to King John. It had been previously arranged that her eldest daughter Joan should marry Hugh, and the little girl was being brought up at the Lusignan court in preparation for her marriage. Hugh, however, upon seeing Isabella, whose beauty had not diminished, preferred the girl's mother. Joan was provided with another husband, King Alexander II of Scotland, whom she wed in 1221.

Isabella married Hugh without the consent of the king's council in England, as was required of a queen dowager. That council had the power not only to assign to her any subsequent husband, but to decide whether she should be allowed (or forced) to remarry at all. That Isabella flouted its authority moved the council to confiscate her dower lands and to stop the payment of her pension. Isabella and her husband retaliated by threatening to keep Joan, who had been promised in marriage to the King of Scotland, in France. The council first responded by sending furious letters to the Pope, signed in the name of young King Henry, urging him to excommunicate Isabella and her husband, but then decided to come to terms with Isabella, to avoid conflict with the Scottish king, who was eager to receive his bride. Isabella was granted the stannaries in Devon, and the revenue of Aylesbury for a period of four years, in compensation for her confiscated dower lands in Normandy, as well as the £3,000 arrears for her pension.

Isabella had nine more children by Hugh X. Their eldest son Hugh XI of Lusignan succeeded his father as Count of La Marche and Count of Angoulême in 1249.

Isabella's children from her royal marriage did not join her in Angoulême, remaining in England with their eldest brother Henry III.

== Rebellion and death ==
Described by some contemporaries as "vain, capricious and troublesome," Isabella could not reconcile herself with her less prominent position in France. Though a former queen of England, Isabella was now mostly regarded as a mere countess and had to give precedence to other women. In 1241, when Isabella and Hugh were summoned to the French court to swear fealty to King Louis IX of France's brother, Alphonse, who had been invested as Count of Poitou, their mother, Queen Dowager Blanche openly snubbed her. This so infuriated Isabella, who had a deep-seated hatred of Blanche for having fervently supported the French invasion of England during the First Barons' War in May 1216, that she began to conspire actively against King Louis. Isabella and her husband, along with other disgruntled nobles, including her son-in-law Count Raymond VII of Toulouse, sought to create an English-backed confederacy which united the provinces of the south and west against the French king. She encouraged her son Henry in his invasion of Normandy in 1230, but then did not provide him the support she had promised.

In 1244, after the confederacy had failed and Hugh had made peace with King Louis, two royal cooks were arrested for attempting to poison the king; upon questioning they confessed to having been in Isabella's pay. Before Isabella could be taken into custody, she fled to Fontevraud Abbey, where she died on 4 June 1246.

By Isabella's own prior arrangement, she was first buried in the abbey's churchyard as an act of repentance for her many misdeeds. On a visit to Fontevraud, her son King Henry III of England was shocked to find her buried outside the abbey and ordered her immediately moved inside. She was finally placed beside Henry II and Eleanor of Aquitaine. Afterwards, most of her many Lusignan children, having few prospects in France, set sail for England and the court of Henry, their half-brother.

== Issue ==
- With King John of England, five children, all of whom survived into adulthood:
1. Henry III, King of England (1 October 1207 – 16 November 1272). Married Eleanor of Provence, by whom he had issue, including his heir, King Edward I of England.
2. Richard, Earl of Cornwall and King of the Romans (5 January 1209 – 2 April 1272). Married firstly, Isabel Marshal, secondly, Sanchia of Provence, and thirdly, Beatrice of Falkenburg. Had issue.
3. Joan (22 July 1210 – 1238), the wife of King Alexander II of Scotland. Her marriage was childless.
4. Isabella (1214–1241), the wife of Emperor Frederick II, by whom she had issue.
5. Eleanor (1215–1275), who married, firstly, William Marshal, 2nd Earl of Pembroke, and secondly, Simon de Montfort, 6th Earl of Leicester, by whom she had issue.
- With Hugh X of Lusignan, Count of La Marche: nine children, all of whom survived into adulthood:
1. Hugh XI of Lusignan (1221–1250), Count of La Marche and Count of Angoulême. Married Yolande de Dreux, Countess of Penthièvre and of Porhoet, by whom he had issue.
2. Aymer of Lusignan (1222–1260), Bishop of Winchester
3. Agnès de Lusignan (1223–1269). Married William II de Chauvigny (d. 1270), and had issue.
4. Alice of Lusignan (1224 – 9 February 1256). Married John de Warenne, 6th Earl of Surrey, by whom she had issue.
5. Guy of Lusignan (c. 1225 – 1264), killed at the Battle of Lewes. (Tufton Beamish maintains that he escaped to France after the Battle of Lewes and died there in 1269.)
6. Geoffrey of Lusignan (c. 1226 – 1274). Married in 1259 Jeanne, Viscountess of Châtellerault, by whom he had issue.
7. Isabella of Lusignan (c. 1226/1227 – 14 January 1299). Married, firstly, before 1244 Maurice IV, Seigneur de Craon (1224–1250), by whom she had issue; she married, secondly, Geoffrey de Rancon.
8. William of Lusignan (c. 1228 – 1296). First earl of Pembroke. Married Joan de Munchensi, by whom he had issue.
9. Marguerite de Lusignan (c. 1229 – 1288). Married, firstly, in 1243 Raymond VII of Toulouse; secondly, c. 1246 Aimery IX de Thouars, Viscount of Thouars and had issue.

== In popular culture ==
She was played by actress Zena Walker in the TV series The Adventures of Robin Hood episode "Isabella" (1956), before her marriage to John, but not as a 12-year-old. She was portrayed by actress Victoria Abril in the 1976 film Robin and Marian. She was played by actress Lynsey Baxter in the 1979 TV mini-series "The Devil's Crown". She was played by actress Cory Pulman in the episode "The Pretender" (1986) of the TV series Robin of Sherwood. She was portrayed by actress Léa Seydoux in the 2010 film Robin Hood.

== Sources ==
- Barrière, Bernadette (2006). Limousin médiéval: le temps des créations. Presses Universitaires de Limoges.
- Church, Stephen (2015). King John: And the Road to Magna Carta. Basic Books. ISBN 9780465040704.
- Costain, Thomas B. (1962). The Conquering Family. Doubleday and Company, Inc. ISBN 9780385040884.
- Costain, Thomas B. (1959). The Magnificent Century. Doubleday and Company, Inc.
- Dumont, Hervé (2017). Moyen Age et Renaissance au cinéma: L'Angleterre (in French). Books on Demand. p. 212. ISBN 9782322101405.
- Evergates, Theodore (2007). The Aristocracy in the County of Champagne, 1100–1300. University of Pennsylvania Press.
- Jobson, Adrian (2012). The First English Revolution: Simon de Montfort, Henry III and the Barons' War. Bloomsbury Academic.
- Lopez, John (2013). "How to Train Your Villain with *Robin Hood'*s Oscar Isaac". Vanity Fair. Condé Nast.
- Sussex, Elizabeth (1969). Lindsay Anderson. MacKibbon & Kee. ISBN 9780289797372.
- Tout, Thomas Frederick (2009). The Place of the Reign of Edward II in English History. Manchester University Press.
- Vincent, Nicholas (1999). "Isabella of Angouleme:John's Jezebel". In Church, S.D. (ed.). King John: New Interpretations. Boydell Press.
- Vincent, Nicholas (2004). "Isabella [Isabella of Angoulême], suo jure countess of Angoulême (c. 1188–1246)". Oxford Dictionary of National Biography (online ed.). Oxford University Press. doi:10.1093/ref:odnb/14483. (Subscription, Wikipedia Library access or UK public library membership required.)

Isabella of Angoulême House of Taillefer Born: c. 1186/1188 Died: 4 June 1246
Royal titles
| Vacant Title last held by Berengaria of Navarre | Queen consort of England; 24 August 1200 – 18 October 1216 | Vacant Title next held by Eleanor of Provence |
French nobility
| Preceded by Aymer | Countess of Angoulême; 16 June 1202 – 4 June 1246 | Succeeded by Hugh X |
