= William V of Angoulême =

Count of Angoulême from 1087 to 1120

William V of Angoulême, also known as William Taillefer III, was the twelfth count of Angoulême.

William V was born in 1084, the son of Count Fulk of Angoulême and the grandson of Geoffrey of Angoulême and Petronille de Archiac. William III's reign lasted from 1089 until 1118 or 1120.

In 1108 he married Vitapoy de Benauges. They had one son, who succeeded William V as the thirteenth count of Angoulême.

- Wulgrin II of Angoulême

| Preceded by Fulk | Count of Angoulême; 1087–1120 | Succeeded by Wulgrin II |
