= Aymer, Count of Angoulême =

Count of Angoulême

Aymer (also Aymar, Adhemar, Ademar, or Adomar; c. 1160 – 16 June 1202) was the last Count of Angoulême of the House of Taillefer. He was the youngest child of Count William VI and Marguerite de Turenne. Two of his elder brothers, Wulgrin III and William VII, became Counts of Angoulême in succession after the death of their father in 1179.

Aymer succeeded his brother in 1186, and soon after was at the court of Richard the Lionheart, then Duke of Aquitaine and thus Aymer's lord, to receive recognition of his accession. (Note: Vincent stresses that "[i]n practice [the Counts of Angoulême] were semi-autonomous rulers, only loosely tied into the feudal hierarchy. . . [T]he homage rendered to the dukes of Aquitaine by the counts of Anoulême until 1127 did little to compromise their independence.") By 1188, Aymer had married Alice of Courtenay, the daughter of Peter I of Courtenay and thus granddaughter of King Louis VI of France. (Note: An "Alaidis de Courtenai" appears alongside her husband in a charter of 1191, making an award to Saint-Amant-de-Boixe during the abbacy of Jocelin (1186–97).) In that year, Alice gave birth to a daughter, Isabella of Angoulême, who married King John of England in 1200. The marriage alliance was sealed by two treaties, one public, the other private between Aymer and John. The count remained a steady ally of the kings of England against the rebellious House of Lusignan.

Aymer had a claim to the County of La Marche, where in 1199 or 1200 he was exercising authority, perhaps on behalf of his son-in-law, and issued a charter to some monks of Aubignac. In February 1202 when John was visiting Angoulême to negotiate a treaty with Sancho VII of Navarre, Aymer took him on a tour of the newly consecrated abbey church at La Couronne. The role of Aymer's daughter in John's continued refusal to properly care for his brother Richard the Lionheart's widow, Berengaria of Navarre, may explain the Count of Angoulême's proximity to the negotiations between the two kingdoms.

Aymer died in Limoges on 16 June 1202. His daughter and only child succeeded him as Countess of Angoulême. Her title, however, was largely empty since her husband denied her control of her inheritance as well as her marriage dowry and dower. John's appointed governor, Bartholomew de Le Puy (de Podio), ran most of the administrative affairs of Angoulême until John's death in 1216. (Note: shows that he was a minor official as early as 14 June 1202, just before Aymer's death.) In 1217 Isabella returned and seized her inheritance from Bartholomew, who appealed unsuccessfully to the English king for help.

Aymer's widow, Alice, ruled the city of Angoulême until March 1203, when John summoned her to court and granted her a monthly pension of 50 livres d'Anjou in return for her dower rights. She thereafter retired from public life to her estate at La Ferté-Gaucher, where she was living as late as July 1215, when she issued a charter at Provins using the title Countess of Angoulême.

== Sources ==
- Vincent, Nicholas (1999). "Isabella of Angouleme:John's Jezebel". In Church, S.D. (ed.). King John: New Interpretations. Boydell Press.

Aymer, Count of Angoulême House of Taillefer Born: c. 1160 Died: 16 June 1202
Preceded by William V	Count of Angoulême; 1186–1202	Succeeded by Isabella
