= William Taillefer I =

Count of Angoulême

William "Taillefer" I (died August 962) was also known as William II of Angoulême (being the second William in this family since Wulgrin I. His uncle, William I, being the first). He was the Count of Angoulême from 926 to 945. He was the son of Alduin I.

According to one source, his surname, or sobriquet, was acquired "...from the way in which he cut down a Norman Sea-king through his coat of mail". This Norman sea-king is identified as Storis. The name Taillefer was used by subsequent members of this family, especially holders of the title Count of Angoulême.

William was not married, but had at least one, and possibly two, illegitimate sons who would later claim the title of Count of Angoulême.

- Aymer II (possibly ruling as count from after 945 to before 952)
- Arnald II "Manzer" (count from 975 to 988)

== Sources ==
- Callahan, Daniel F. (2016). Jerusalem and the Cross in the Life and Writings of Ademar of Chabannes. Brill.
- Histoire P@ssion - Chronologie historique des Comtes d’Angoulême (in French)
- L'art de Verifier des Faits historiquws, des Chartes, des Chroniques, et Autres Anciens Monuments, Depuis la Naissance de Notre-Seigner by Moreau et Yalade, 1818, Page 179
- The coinage of the European continent, by Swan Sonnenschein, 1893, Page 276
- Annuaire Historique Pour L'annee 1854, by Société de l'histoire de France, Page 178
- Nouvelle Encyclopedie Theologique, by Jacques-Paul Migne, 1854, Page 903

Preceded by Aymer of Poitiers	Count of Angoulême; 926–945	Succeeded by Bernard
