= Leuthard I of Paris =

French noble

Leuthard I of Paris (died c. 813) was count of Paris and Fézensac.

He was the son of Gerard I of Paris and Rotrude. His brothers were the counts Stephen of Paris and Beggo of Paris. (Note: Per Werner, "Nachkommen", pp.429-441.)

Around 781, Leuthard was sent by Charlemagne to the duchy of Aquitaine where he stayed in the circle of Louis the Pious, king of Aquitaine (781–814) and emperor of the West (814–840).

Leuthard married Chrimhilda, with whom he had the following children:

- Engeltrude de Fézensac, wife of Odo of Orléans, and mother of Ermentrude of Orléans who married the future emperor Charles the Bald.
- Adalard the Seneschal (seneschal of the Carolingian empire under the reign of Louis the Pious)
- Girart de Roussillon (or Gerard II of Paris), count of Paris, Roussillon, and Vienne.

In 801, Leuthard followed Emperor Louis the Pious in his expedition to Spain and participated in the capture of Barcelona, for which he received the county of Fézensac in the duchy of Aquitaine, where he became the first count. In 809, he was probably involved in the siege of Tortosa.

According to historian René Poupardin, Leuthard ended his days in the county of Paris.

His brother Beggo succeeded him as count of Paris.

== Sources ==
- Heidecker, Karl (2010). The Divorce of Lothar II: Christian Marriage and Political Power in the Carolingian World. Translated by Guest, Tanis M. Cornell University Press.61
- Le Jan, Régine (2003). Famille et pouvoir dans le monde franc (VIIe-Xe siècle): essai d'anthropologie sociale (in French). Publications de la Sorbonne.
- Riché, Pierre (1993). The Carolingians: A Family Who Forged Europe. Translated by Allen, Michael Idomir. University of Pennsylvania Press.
