= Amaury III de Craon =

French seneschal (died 1333)

Arms of Craon family: Lozengy or and gules.

Amaury III de Craon (died 1333), Lord of Créon, Mareuil and Sablé, Seneschal of Gascony as well as seneschal of Anjou, Maine and Touraine.

== Life ==
He was a son of Maurice V of Craon and Mathilde Berthout. In 1313, Amaury III became Seneschal of Gascony, holding the position until 1316. He received a charter in 1315 to build a bastide at Créon, with permission of King Edward II of England. He was appointed as the Seneschal of Gascony from 1320 until 1322. With the creation of Lieutenants-General to protect the borders of the border provinces, King Charles IV of France in 1323, then Philip IV in March 1331, buy successively the hereditary positions of Seneschal of Touraine, Anjou and the Maine from Amaury III.

Amaury died on 26 January 1333, and was buried in the Convent of the Cordeliers, Angers.

== Marriage and issue ==
Craon married firstly Isabelle, daughter of Guillaume IV le Valet, lord of Ste-Maure, they had the following known issue:

- Maurice VI de Craon (died 1330), married Marguerite de Mello, had issue.

He married secondly Béatrice, daughter of John IV, Count de Roucy and Jeanne de Dreux, they had the following known issue:

- Amauri of Chantocé and La Suze (died 1334).
- Pierre de La Suze (died 1376), married firstly Marguerite de Pons and secondly Catherine de Machecoul.
- Guillaume I de Craon (died 1388), the king's chamberlain, Viscount Châteaudun married Margaret of Flanders Dendermonde
- Jean III de Craon (died 1373), Bishop of Mans in 1350-55 and Archbishop of Reims in 1355.
- Beatrix de Craon, married firstly John de Parthenay and secondly Eon de Lohéac.
- Simon de Craon (died 1333)
- Isabelle de Craon (died 1334)
- Marguerite de Craon (died 1336), nun at Longchamp Abbey.
