= Counts and dukes of Angoulême =

Rulers of Angoulême

Angoulême (L'Angoumois) in western France was part of the Carolingian Kingdom of Aquitaine. Under Charlemagne's successors, the local count of Angoulême was independent and the county was not united with the French crown until 1308. By the terms of the Treaty of Brétigny (1360) the Angoumois, then ruled by the counts of Angoulême, was ceded to King Edward III of England. In 1371 it became a fief of Duke John of Berry and then passed to Duke Louis I of Orleans, both of whom were cadets of the French royal family. From then on it was held by cadets of the Valois House of Orleans, until Francis of Angoulême, became king of France in 1515. Angoumois was definitively incorporated into the French crown lands, as a duchy.

== Counts of Angoulême ==
=== House of Guilhelmides ===
- Turpio (839–863)
- Emenon of Poitiers (863–866), brother of Turpio
  - Aymer of Poitiers (Aymer I of Angoulême) (916–926), son of Emenon

=== House of Taillefer ===
Coat of arms of the counts of Angoulême

- Wulgrin I (866–886), first hereditary count, appointed by Charles the Bald
- Alduin I (886–916), son of Wulgrin I
- William II ("Taillefer" I) (926–c.945), son of Alduin I
- Aymer II (after 945–before 952), son of William II (Taillefer I)
- Bernard (after 945–before 952), son of William I (William I is the son of Wulgrin I and brother to Alduin I)
- Arnald I "Voratio" (after 950–before 952), son of Bernard
- William III "Taillefer" (952– 962), son of Bernard
- Rannulf "Bompar" (962–975), son of Bernard
- Richard the Simple (975?), son of Bernard
- Arnald II "Manzer" (975–988), son of William II (Taillefer I)
- William IV (Taillefer II) (988–1028), son of Arnald II
- Alduin (II) (1028–1031), son of William IV (Taillefer II)
- Geoffrey (1031–1047), son of William IV (Taillefer II)
- Fulk (1047–1087), son of Geoffrey
- William V (Taillefer III) (1087–1120), son of Fulk
- Wulgrin II (1120–1140), son of William V (Taillefer III)
- William VI (Taillefer IV) (1140–1179), son of Wulgrin II
- Wulgrin III (1179–1181), son of William VI (Taillefer IV)
- William VII (Taillefer V) (1181–1186), son of William VI (Taillefer IV)
- Aymer III (1186–1202), son of William VI (Taillefer IV)
- Isabella (1202–1246), daughter of Aymer III
  - John of England (House of Plantagenet) (1202–1216), first husband of Isabella
  - Hugh X of Lusignan (House of Lusignan, see below) (1220–1249), second husband of Isabella

=== House of Lusignan ===
Coat of arms of the lords of Lusignan

- Hugh X of Lusignan (Hugh I of Angoulême) (1219–1249). His father, Hugh IX of Lusignan, was married to Mathilde of Angoulême, daughter of Wulgrin III Taillefer (see above)
- Hugh XI of Lusignan (II of Angoulême) (1246–1250)
- Hugh XII of Lusignan (III of Angoulême) (1250–1270)
- Hugh XIII of Lusignan (IV of Angoulême) (1270–1303)
- Guy (1303–1308)
- Part of Aquitaine (1308–1317)
- Royal Domain (1317–1328)

=== Royal Grantees ===
- Joan (1328–1349) House of Capet, with her husband, Philip III of Navarre. House of Évreux
  - Philip (1328–1343) House of Évreux
- Charles de La Cerda (1350–1354) House of La Cerda
- John I (1356–1374) House of Valois
- Louis I (1404–1407), Duke of Orléans. House of Valois-Orléans
- John II (1407–1467) House of Valois-Orléans-Angoulême
- Charles (1459–1496) House of Valois-Orléans-Angoulême
- Francis (1496–1515) House of Valois-Orléans-Angoulême

== Dukes of Angoulême ==
Coat of arms of the counts of Angoulême of the Valois-Orléans family

- Louise (1515–1531)
- Royal domain
- Charles (1540–1545)
- Royal domain
- Charles (1550)
- Henry (1551–1574)
- Henry (1574–1582)
- Diane (1582–1619)
- Charles (1619–1650)
- Louis Emmanuel (1650–1653)
- Frances Marie (1653–1696)
  - Louis II (1653–1654)
- Royal domain
- Élisabeth Marguerite d'Orléans (1675–1696)
- Royal domain
- Charles de France (1710–1714)
- Royal domain
- Charles Philippe de France (1773–1836)
- Louis Antoine d'Artois (1836–1844)
- Royal domain

== Duchesses of Angoulême ==
- Louise of Savoy (1476–1531) - wife of Charles, Count of Angoulême from 1488.
- Marie Thérèse of France (1778–1851) - wife of Louis Antoine from 1799.
