= Thomas Leighton =

Thomas or Tom Leighton may refer to:

- Thomas Leighton (fl.1485), MP for Shropshire (UK Parliament constituency)
- Thomas Leighton (died 1600), MP for Shropshire
- Thomas Leighton (governor), died 1610, 16th century Governor of Guernsey and MP for Worcestershire
- Thomas Leighton (surgeon) (died 1848), surgeon to the general hospital of Newcastle-upon-Tyne
- Thomas M. Leighton, American politician

== See also ==
- Thomas Layton (disambiguation)
