= André de Chauvigny =

Andre de Chauvigny (or Andrew of Chauvigny) (c. 1150–1202) was a Poitevin knight in the service of Richard I of England. He was the second son of Pierre-Hélie of Chauvigny and Haois of Châtellerault. Haois was the great-aunt of King Richard making Andrew and Richard second cousins.

== Richard the Lion-Hearted ==
Pierre-Hélie served the bishops of Poitiers as hereditary provost of Chauvigny. At some point prior to 1180, Andrew held land of the chateaux de Monthoiron in Poitou and perhaps even possessed a fortified manor there. Andrew was popular in the tournament circuit of the day. He was enlisted into the household of his cousin, King Richard while he was still just count of Poitou, presumably sometime after 1182.

When Richard was allied to Philip II of France in 1189, they had attacked the old King, Henry II of England at the town of his birth, Le Mans. Richard assaulted Le Mans and set fire to the city. Henry, with his captain William Marshal, was able to flee. William Marshal took up the rear of Henry's force. Andrew was in the lead of Richard's pursuit force. Andrew and William clashed, and on that day, William was able to unhorse Andrew. The "History of William Marshal" reported that Andrew suffered a severe break in his arm.

Later that year, after Henry had died, and Richard reconciled the Angevin barons to him, he offered Andrew as a reward for his service, Denise, Countess of Devon (1173–1221), widow of the third Earl, who was the heiress of Raoul VII de Deols (d. 1176). Denise de Déols brought to Andrew the border barony of Châteauroux, which included castles at Châteauroux, Déols, Le Chatelet, La Châtre, and Saint-Chartrier. This immediately made Andrew one of the most powerful lords of Poitevin Berry, an important frontier zone of the Angevin Empire that protected the roads leading to the capital cities of Tours, Poitiers and Angers. At some point, Richard also granted Andrew fiefs at Bituresii in the county of Anjou.

== Third Crusade and thereafter ==
Andrew was one of King Richard's central military figures of the Third Crusade (1190–1192). He was with the King at the muster of Vezelay and departed with the army to Marseille on 4 July 1190. He was present with the King at Sicily and proved to be a competent military commander at the Siege of Acre and the Battle of Arsuf. According to the chronicler Richard de Templo, during one of the many skirmishes the crusaders fought against Saladin's forces, Andrew was wounded through the arm by a Muslim lance. Andrew was granted command by Richard over many other key crusader lords, and at one point, even Robert IV of Leicester and Hugh of Saint-Pol seem subordinate to him. He also seemed to have authority over the knights of the familia regis, knights like Peter de Preaux, William des Roches and Gerard de Fournival. After the cessation of hostilities, Andrew would command the first battalion of pilgrims that entered Jerusalem, followed by Ralph Taisson and Hubert Walter, commanders of the second and third battalions respectively.

Upon Andrew's return from the crusade, he found that King Philip of France had taken much of the land in Poitevin Berry, including the important castle of Issoudun. Andrew remained loyal to Richard and assisted in the retaking of Loches and Châtillon-sur-Indre, 1194. Later, Andrew would be Richard's forces during the attack on Adhemar, count of Angoulême.

King Richard attempted to end the war in 1196 with the Treaty of Gaillon. The treaty was essentially a grant to almost all of Philip's demands for the Vexin and Berry. Technically, the treaty called for Andrew to become a liege-vassal of the King of France for his fiefs in Berry. As the treaty proved to be a failure, and the war continued, Andrew remained firmly in the Angevin camp.

With the death of King Richard at the siege of the tower of Chalus-Chabrol in 1199, Andrew had another important decision to make. Does he side with Richard's younger brother, John of England, who had a history of animosity with the French King, or with Richard's nephew, Arthur of Brittany. Andrew chose to ally with Duke Arthur. Arthur had been invested by King Philip as the rightful lord of the Angevin inheritance. In October 1199, Andrew paid homage to Arthur for his fiefs in Anjou and Poitou and paid homage to King Philip for his castles and lands in Berry.

Andrew fought with the forces of Duke Arthur against King John of England and William des Roches, now seneschal of Anjou and sire de Sable, at the Battle of Mirebeau in 1202. He was captured along with Arthur and most of the Poitevin and Breton nobility. He was sent to Rouen. Many of John's prisoners were starved to death; he may have been one of them, as the Complete Peerage concludes. In any case, he died that year, and John gave his widow's English lands back to the Earls of Devon.

He was succeeded as baron of Deols-Chateroux by his twelve-year-old son William.
