= Thomas Leighton (died 1600) =

Member of the Parliament of England

Thomas Leighton (c. 1554 – 17 May 1600) was an English soldier and politician.

== Life ==
He was the eldest son of Sir Edward Leighton of Wattlesborough Castle and his second wife Anne Dayrell, daughter of Paul Dayrell of Lillingstone Dayrell, Buckinghamshire. Sir Thomas Leighton, Governor of Guernsey was his uncle. Both his father and his uncle are said to have enjoyed the trust of Queen Elizabeth I. He was educated at Shrewsbury School (1566) and studied law at the Inner Temple in 1571.

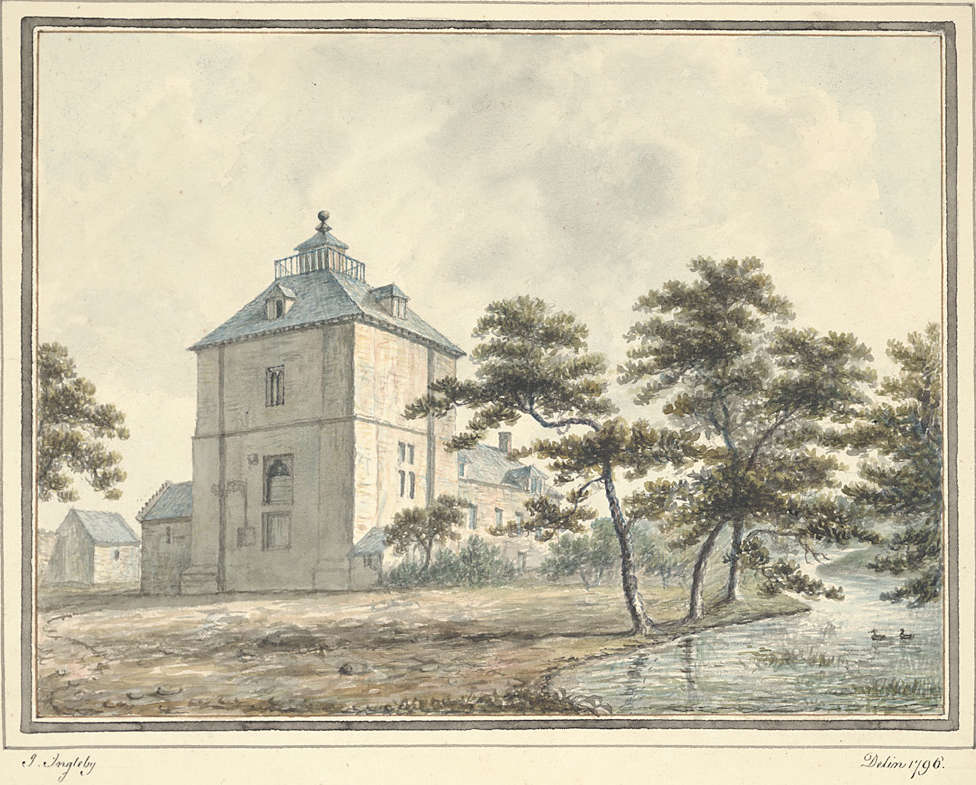
Wattlesborough, the Leighton family home from 1471 to 1711

As a young man, he was a soldier and may have served in the Low Countries. By 1588 he had become captain of the county's trained militia units.

He was a justice of the peace from c.1592 and a Deputy Lieutenant of Shropshire from 1596. He was a member (MP) of the parliament of England for Shropshire in 1597, but less than a month after parliament met he was granted permission to return home because of his poor health. In 1598 he was named a commissioner for the poor in Shropshire.

He died in 1600 and was buried at Alberbury. He was described as "a worthy gentleman, well-beloved by his shire".

== Family ==
He married Elizabeth (d. 1626), the daughter of Sir William Gerard, Lord Chancellor of Ireland

Their children:

- Robert (d. 1625) married Ann (d. 1620), daughter of Sir Edward Devereux of Castle Bromwich, Warws. He was the ancestor of the Leighton baronets of Wattlesborough.
- Edward of Melverley, Shrops.
- Rowland (d. 1621)
- Lionel (d. 1628) married Jane, daughter of Thomas Harper of Greete, Shrops.
- Jane died unmarried.
- Anne married Sir George Greaves of Moseley, Worcs.
- Mary married Robert Owen of Woodhouse, Shropshire.

== Notes ==
Parliament of England
Preceded by Francis Newport; Sir Robert Needham	Member of Parliament for Shropshire; 1597; With: Henry Bromley	Succeeded by John Egerton; Roger Owen
