= Château de Saint-Lô =

Castle in Saint-Lô, Normandy, France

- Saint-Lô, Normandy, France

Location
- Coordinates: 49°07′N 1°05′W

Château de Saint-Lô (French pronunciation: [ʃato də sɛ̃ lo]) was a castle in Saint-Lô, Normandy, France.

== History ==
Charlemagne built a fortified place at Saint-Lô in response to the incursions of the Vikings.

The bishops of Coustances, Robert I or Geoffrey de Montbray, built a stone castle at Saint-Lô in the 11th century.

During 1141, Saint-Lô surrendered to Geoffroy Plantagenet, count of Anjou, after three days of siege. John of England lost the Duchy of Normandy following their recapture by the French Crown in 1204. Saint-Lo surrendered to Philip II of France.

Saint-Lô was captured by the English on 22 July 1346 during the Crécy campaign by Edward III of England. It was recaptured by the French in 1378 by Charles VI of France but it was again lost to the English on 12 March 1418, under Humphrey, Duke of Gloucester. The French regained Saint-Lô on 12 September 1449.

Saint-Lô successfully withstood and repelled an attack in 1467, by Francis II, Duke of Brittany.
