= Edward Sutton, 2nd Baron Dudley =

English noble

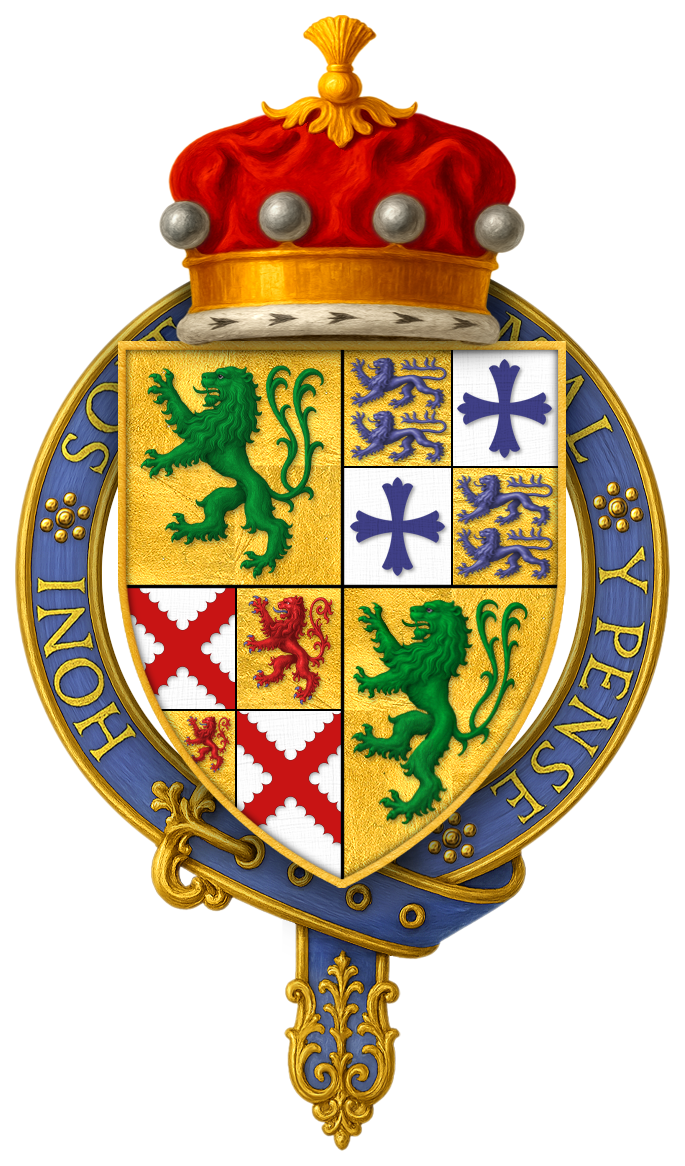
Arms of Sir Edward Sutton, 2nd Baron Dudley, KG

Edward Sutton, 2nd Baron Dudley (c. 1460 – 31 January 1531) was an English nobleman created a Knight of the Garter (KG) in the beginning of King Henry VIII's reign. He was chamberlain to Princess Mary (later Queen Mary I) from 1525 to 1528.

== Early life ==
Edward Sutton was the eldest son of Sir Edmund Sutton and Joyce de Tiptoft, daughter of Sir John Tiptoft, 1st Baron Tiptoft. In right of his wife Joyce, Edmund Dudley benefited from her inheritance of the Tibetot barony and Cherleton barony, and thus co-heir to the Powis inheritance, but was never created baron of these holdings.

Through his uncle, John Sutton Dudley, Knt. of Atherington, his first cousin was Edmund Dudley (Henry VII's minister), who was the father of John Dudley, 1st Duke of Northumberland. Another uncle was William Dudley, Bishop of Durham.

His aunt, Eleanor Dudley, married Sir Henry Beaumont of Wednesbury, and George Stanley, of West Bromwich and High Sheriff of Staffordshire in 1473.

The book A Declaration Made by the Prynce of Conde (1562) was published in his name by the publishing operation of Geneva Bible publisher Sir Rowland Hill

== Peerage ==
In 1487, upon the death of his grandfather, John Sutton, 1st Baron Dudley, he inherited the barony of Dudley, which had been created for him in 1440, ten years after he had served as Lord Lieutenant of Ireland.

== Personal life ==
Edward married Cecily Willoughby, daughter of Sir William Willoughby and Joan Strangeways, and granddaughter of Katherine Neville, Duchess of Norfolk, by whom he had:

1. John Sutton, 3rd Baron Dudley, his successor.
2. Hon. Geoffrey Sutton, who married Eleanor Talbot, by whom he was the father of Thomas Sutton of Russels.
3. Hon. Thomas Sutton.
4. Hon. Arthur Sutton, prebendary in Lichfield Cathedral (see Chad of Mercia).
5. Hon. Elizabeth Sutton, who married Thomas Butler, son of Piers Butler, 8th Earl of Ormond.
6. Hon. Alice Dudley [Sutton].
7. Hon. Eleanor Sutton, who married firstly Charles Somerset, 1st Earl of Worcester, and secondly Leonard Grey, 1st Viscount Grane.
8. Hon. Joyce Sutton, who married firstly Sir John Leighton of Wattlesborough. After his death, she married Richard Lee, MP for Much Wenlock, before 1538.
9. Hon. Jane (Joan, Johanna) Sutton, who married Sir Thomas Fiennes, son of Thomas, Baron Dacre.
10. Hon. Margaret Sutton, who married John Grey, 2nd Baron Grey of Powis. Their son was Edward Grey, 3rd Baron Grey of Powis, to whom his uncle John, Lord Dudley, sold the Tiptoft-Dudley portion of Powis Castle.
11. Hon. Catherine Sutton, who married Sir George Gresley of Drakelow.

=== Descendants ===
Through his daughter Joyce's first marriage, he was a grandfather of Sir Edward Leighton, was custos rotulorum for Shropshire, and Sir Thomas Leighton, the Governor of Jersey who married Elizabeth Knollys (a daughter of Catherine Carey and sister of Lettice Knollys).

Through his daughter Jane, he was a grandfather of Thomas Fiennes, 9th Baron Dacre, who was executed for murder in 1541.

== Notes ==
Peerage of England
Preceded by John Sutton	Baron Dudley; 1487–1532	Succeeded by John Sutton
