= William Gerard =

English politician (1518–1581)

Arms of Gerard: Azure, a lion rampant ermine crowned or

Sir William Gerard (1518–1581) was an Elizabethan statesman, who had a distinguished record of government service in England, Wales and most notably in Ireland. He sat in the House of Commons for Chester for many years, and was Vice-President of the Council of Wales and the Marches.

He was Lord Chancellor of Ireland for five years. Historians have praised his energetic efforts to reform the Irish legal system, although they differ as to his effectiveness in this task. Despite the fact that he was not a clergyman, he was appointed Dean of St Patrick's Cathedral, Dublin in 1573, although he admitted to having an "uneasy conscience" about his fitness for any clerical position.

== Early life ==
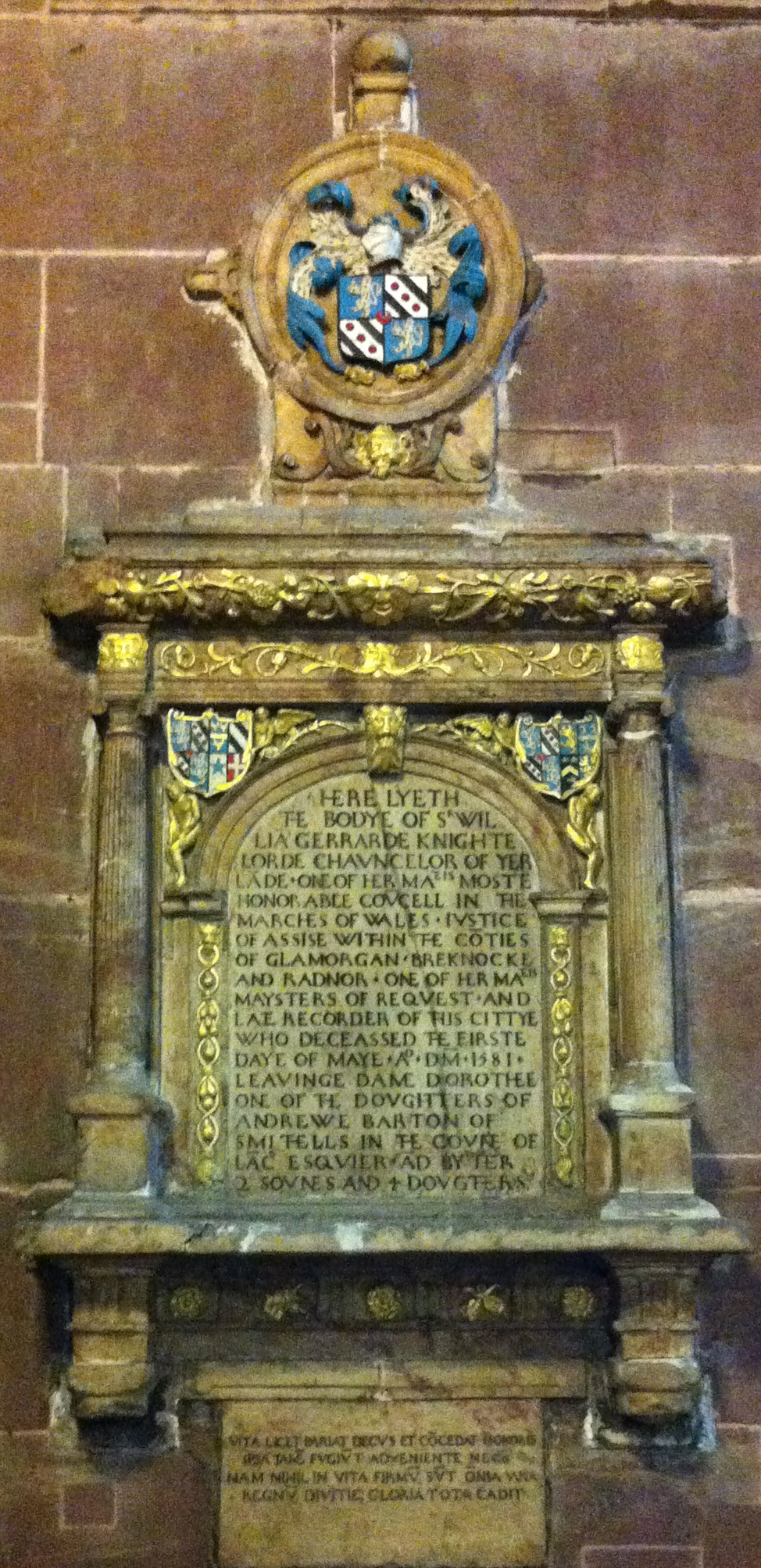
Mural monument to Sir William Gerard in Chester Cathedral

He was born at Ince-in-Makerfield in Lancashire, son of Gilbert Gerard and Elizabeth (Eleanor?) Davison, daughter of an alderman of Chester, a city with which William was to have a long association, and where he died. Sir Gilbert Gerard, the English Master of the Rolls, was his cousin, and is said to have advanced William's career.

William entered Gray's Inn in 1543, was called to the Bar in 1546, and became an Ancient of Gray's Inn (this title was normally awarded to those barristers who had practised in the Inn for ten years) in 1552. Elrington Ball argues that his legal qualifications were insufficient for the office of Lord Chancellor of Ireland, but in fact, William had acquired considerable legal experience. He was made Attorney General for Wales in 1554, Recorder of Chester in 1556, a justice in Wales in 1559 and vice-justice of Chester in 1561.

== Political career ==
Starting in 1555, Gerard sat in six consecutive parliaments as a member for Chester — the last two of Queen Mary I's reign, her 4th (1555) and 5th (1558) and the first four of Queen Elizabeth I's reign, 1st (1559), 2nd (1563), 3rd (1571) and 4th (1572).

Gerard became a member of the Council of Wales and the Marches in 1560, and Vice-President of the Council in 1562. He gained the reputation of being an energetic and efficient administrator, and an enthusiastic reformer, and it was for that reason that the Lord Deputy of Ireland, Sir Henry Sidney, asked for him to be appointed Lord Chancellor of Ireland in 1576. The office had been vacant for three years, and Sidney wanted a zealous Chancellor to assist him in his ambitious reform program. He had worked with Gerard during his time in Wales, and had the highest opinion of his abilities. For some years a warm friendship existed between the two men: the unusual first name, Sidney, which Gerard gave to one of his daughters (who later became Lady Wynn) may have been a tribute to their friendship.

== Lord Chancellor of Ireland ==
Even Elrington Ball, who has a rather poor opinion of Gerard overall, admits that he came to Ireland with good intentions and at first showed himself to be an energetic and capable Lord Chancellor. He announced his intention of extending the assize system across the Kingdom of Ireland, to restore public order and deal with the serious crime problem, and quickly established regular sessions throughout the east and south-east. Ball, however, argues that going on assize so often caused him to neglect the duties of his own office, which was based in Dublin. He initially urged the removal of most of the Irish-born High Court judges as being old and unfit to serve, calling them "scarecrows, mere shadows", and requested that they be replaced by English-born judges; later, however, he was prepared to accept Irish judges of sufficient legal ability.

He argued for the need to introduce large numbers of English settlers to Ireland (in Ball's opinion, this is an example of Gerard's habit of constantly interfering in matters which were none of his business). He wrote vividly of the wretched and starving condition of the native Irish; some parts of the country were almost depopulated. The country was much afflicted by thieves, all of whom should be hanged: "English justice must be the executioner". He had a low opinion of his Irish civil servants, finding "not one good man among the whole crew". By March 1577 he was insisting that he must have English lawyers to assist him, or else, he claimed, the job would be the death of him.

Crawford, the author of A Star Chamber Court in Ireland, argues that Gerard as Lord Chancellor had a twofold aim: to re-establish the authority of the courts of common law throughout Ireland, and to supplement their authority by using the powers vested in his own office to turn the Court of Castle Chamber, the Irish equivalent of Star Chamber, which had been established in 1571, into an effective executive body for maintenance of public order. In the second aim at least he had considerable success in the early years, when Castle Chamber heard a large number of cases dealing with riot, affray and other offences against public order. Gerard has been praised for the meticulous care he took in investigating cases before the Court and his willingness to bring them to resolution.

So heavy indeed was the volume of public order cases in Castle Chamber that in 1579 he apologized to Lord Burghley for being unable to hear a private case in which Burghley had an interest. One notable private case was brought against the 8th Baron Howth on a charge of cruelty to his wife and daughter Jane. Castle Chamber accepted the evidence that he had beaten his wife so severely that she was in fear of her life, while Jane had died soon after a similar beating, and probably as a direct result of it. Given Howth's social standing, the penalties were severe enough: he was briefly imprisoned, subjected to heavy fines and ordered to pay maintenance to his wife, who was allowed to live apart from him and was given custody of their children.

Gerard studied the history of English rule in Ireland, and the reasons for the Crown's failure to establish its authority over the whole island, in-depth.He concluded that the turning point was 1350, after which English authority in Ireland began inexorably to shrink.

== The cess controversy ==
The Sidney administration was weakened by the Anglo-Irish gentry's intense opposition to Sidney's proposals on tax reform, and in particular to the levying of cess, a bitterly unpopular tax for the upkeep of military garrisons of the Pale (the counties surrounding Dublin which were under secure Crown control), which the gentry complained imposed a crippling financial burden on them. The cess controversy reached its height in 1577 when Sidney persuaded the Queen to imprison three eminent Irish barristers who had gone to London to petition for his proposals to be withdrawn. At this point, serious political differences between Sidney and Gerard, who had originally supported the reforms, emerged: Gerard believed that Sidney's coercive approach was a mistake, he came to accept that the cess was unduly burdensome, and he was friendly with Barnaby Scurloke, the leader of the deputation which had been imprisoned. He had always prided himself on his independence, and argued that CouncilLord should not show undue deference to the Lord Deputy.

Gerard travelled to London to urge a policy of moderation and to plead for the release of the three imprisoned lawyers, and apparently outlined his own alternative to the levying of cess, while being careful to defend Sidney's policy in general. The Queen, having initially supported Sidney, was persuaded by Gerard's arguments that the cess was a mistaken policy and rebuked Sidney for trying to introduce it. The Lord Deputy now quarrelled violently with Gerard, whose advice he had until then greatly relied on, and whom he had called "my counsellor". Sidney was recalled in 1578.

== Last years and death ==
Gerard's efforts to reform the Irish legal system slackened off in his later years: his quarrel with Sidney, Sidney's recall to England and the outbreak of the second Desmond Rebellion in 1579 destroyed the impetus for radical change. Ambitious plans for the establishment of full judicial circuits were shelved in the short term. Gerard, who had often been in ill health during his years in Wales, complained about the effect on his constitution of the damp Irish climate, and he was now over sixty, a considerable age for the time. From 1579 on he was in very poor health, suffering from dysentery, shortness of breath, severe pains in his legs, and some form of skin disease. He spent most of his last years in Chester, with occasional visits back to Ireland. In 1579 he was given a knighthood, and appointed Master of Requests. The Queen sent one of her own physicians to treat him.

By 1580 it was clear that he could not live long, and the Queen gave him permission to retire to Chester. He had planned to visit London in March of that year, but found himself "lame beyond hope of recovery". He wrote a loyal letter to Elizabeth I, saying that he hoped to see her one more time even if he had to crawl all the way to London, but by then he was too ill to leave Chester, where he died in early May 1581. He was buried in St. Oswald's Church, Chester, then situated within Chester Cathedral, where survives his mural monument. Much of his will is devoted to a description of his financial troubles and the difficulties he experienced in providing for his family.

== Family ==
Gerard married Dorothy, daughter of Andrew Barton of Smithhills, Bolton, Lancashire and his wife Anne Stanley, daughter of Sir William Stanley of Haughton, Cheshire, (and sister of Ralph Barton, MP for Nottingham). Some of the Barton family were recusants, but Dorothy, like her husband, seems to have been a staunch Protestant. Dorothy outlived him, although in his will he spoke of her frequent and serious illnesses. They had two sons and four daughters including:

- Gilbert, the eldest son, who was later MP for Chester and married Ellen, daughter of William Pearson of Chester.
- Elizabeth (died 1626), who married Thomas Leighton (died 1600), MP for Shropshire, son of Sir Edward Leighton of Wattlesborough Castle, by whom she had seven children, including Robert, their eldest son and heir. They were the ancestors of the Leighton baronets of Wattlesborough.
- Sidney (died 1632), who married Sir John Wynn, 1st Baronet of Gwydir Castle, by whom she had 12 children, including Sir Richard Wynn, 2nd Baronet, and Sir Owen Wynn, 3rd Baronet.
- Judith, who was still unmarried when her father died, and received a substantial legacy in his will.

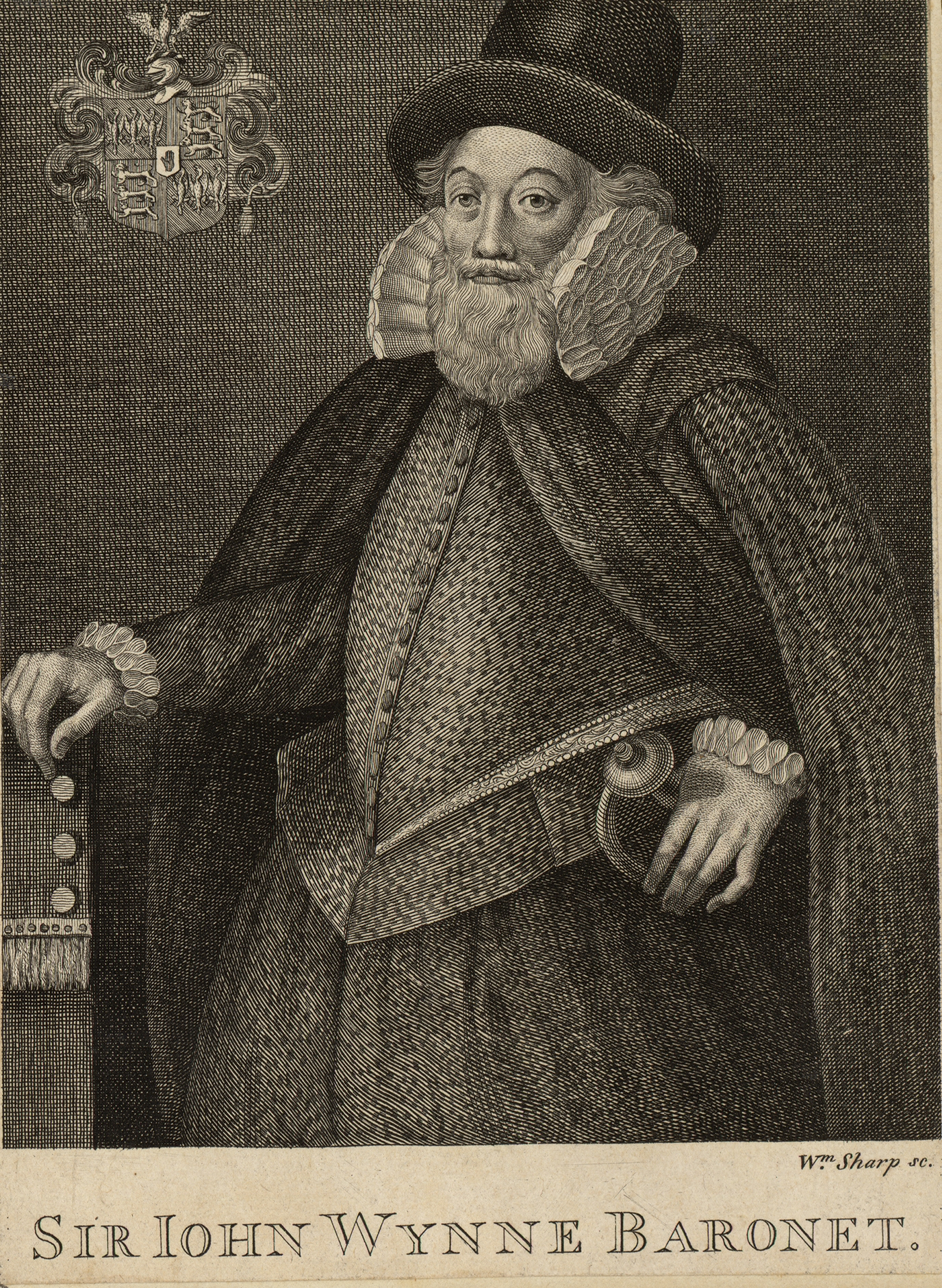
Sir John Wynn, 1st Baronet, who married Gerard's daughter Sidney

- Margareta received something (maybe), but more info is needed. Went on to marry a man named Richard Marten, by whom she had one known daughter named Dorothy. Margareta died in 1637.

== Reputation ==
Historians agree that Gerard began his career in Ireland with an energetic attempt to reform the legal system. Elrington Ball however argues that he soon abandoned the effort at reform, neglected his proper office and interfered in matters outside his remit. Ball also criticises him for accepting, though with considerable qualms of conscience, the Deanery of St Patrick's, despite the fact that he had never taken holy orders. It must be said that there was a recent precedent: Robert Weston, the previous Lord Chancellor, had also been Dean of St. Patrick's, and Weston was also a layman, although one held in high regard by the Anglican hierarchy.

Ball also suggests he was not free from corruption, although there seems to be little evidence of this: the reference in his will to his "wicked life" may simply be a conventional reference to his Puritan belief in human wickedness generally.

O'Flanagan, on the other hand, in his rather brief study of Gerard describes him as an energetic and conscientious Lord Chancellor who probably damaged his health by overwork. Crawford goes further in praising Gerard as an outstanding Chancellor. He calls him an energetic and capable reformer who in his early years in Ireland did much to re-establish the authority of the courts and, as the case of Lord Howth shows, was willing to administer impartial justice even against members of the nobility.

== Notes ==
Political offices
Preceded by Archbishop Adam Loftus (as Lord Keeper)	Lord Chancellor of Ireland; 1576–1581	Succeeded by Archbishop Adam Loftus
