= Peter de Preaux =

Norman knight

Peter de Preaux (Latin: Petrus de Pratellis; French: Pierre de Préaux; died 1212) was a Norman knight in the service of the Angevin kings of England. Given control of the Channel Islands by King John, he was the first recorded lord of the Isles outside the royal family.

== Life ==
=== Early life ===
Peter's father Osbert was a minor Norman baron in the Roumois, the neighborhood of Rouen, capital of Normandy. He held the tower and town of Preaux as well as land at Darnétal and a scattering of manors in England. As Osbert's second son, Peter initially had few prospects for a landed estate but—along with his brothers John, William, and Enguerrand—he entered the English royal household at a very early age, serving over the course of his life under Henry II, Richard I, and John. Peter and William became known throughout the tournament circuit of the day as fierce warriors and competent knights. Osbert died at some point prior to 1189, with John succeeding to the family barony.

=== Richard I ===
In 1190, Peter and William accompanied King Richard on the Third Crusade. Peter was assigned the dignity of royal standard-bearer over the hereditary standard-bearer of England, Robert Trussebut. He and William were recorded with the King at Vezelay, Marseille, Sicily, the conquest of Cyprus, the Siege of Acre, the Battle of Arsuf, the march to Jaffa, the advance on Jerusalem, Darum, and the Battle of Jaffa.

After the truce had been established between Richard and Saladin, Peter was assigned an important mission with other household knights, including William des Roches and Gerard de Fournival. The crusading host had been permitted by the Muslims to complete the pilgrimage to Jerusalem. Peter and his band were sent ahead of the first battalion to obtain safe conduct. According to the chronicle of the crusade attributed to Geoffrey of Vinsauf, Peter had fallen asleep at one of the villages where he was to meet a Saracen embassy. The crusaders charged ahead without receiving their safe conduct and, when Peter and his company awoke, they realized that they were already behind the Christian host. Peter made all haste to catch up. He was then reprimanded by the column's commander, the king's cousin, Andrew of Chauvigny. King Richard's last act prior to departing the Holy Land for Europe was to ransom Peter's brother, William, who had been captured by Saladin's forces a year prior while personally keeping the King from being captured. William and Peter returned to Normandy in late 1192.

Peter then served King Richard throughout his wars against Philip II of France, 1194–1199.

=== John I ===
Prince John had been created Lord of the Isles (dominus insulae), among other titles, by Richard in exchange for his pledge to leave Richard's regents undisturbed in their rule during his absence on crusade. Upon Richard's death, King John elevated Peter to his lordship over the Channel Islands in charters dated 14 January and 21 June 1200. John required Peter to provide him with 3 knights from its income (per servicium feodi trium militum) and reserved the right to exchange the islands for any other title at his pleasure. In 1201, Peter married Mary de Vernon, daughter of William de Vernon, 5th Earl of Devon and the Isle of Wight. In 1203, he granted the Écréhous near Jersey to the Abbey of Our Lady of Val-Richer to erect a new priory on its rocks. Meanwhile, Peter's brother William was made bailiff of the Oximin.

Philip II had already begun the French conquest of Normandy in 1202, having declared John's duchy and other Continental possessions forfeit for the murder of his nephew Arthur. King John abandoned Normandy for the safety of England by December 1203. Peter's brother John sided at this point with Philip of France. Peter was subsequently granted some of John's lands as terra Normannorum (Latin for "Norman land"), holdings seized by the English kings from lords who submitted to the king of France to maintain their other estates on the Continent.

King John had left the defense of Rouen with Peter as commander. His force included Henri d'Estouteville, Robert d'Esneval, Richard de Villequier, Thomas de Pavilly, Peter de Hotot and many knights of Robert, count of Alençon who did not follow their lord into his treason against King John. By spring of 1204, Rouen was besieged by the French with the rest of Normandy lost. Peter, in agreement with the leading men of the city, surrendered to Philip. Peter then took ship to England, where he was well received by King John for his service and for having maintained English control or claim over the Channel Islands. Peter retired to a quiet life on his new English estates. It is believed that he died sometime in the year 1212.

== See also ==
- List of governors of Guernsey
- Governors or "captains" of Jersey
