= Edmund Sutton =

English knight

Sir Edmund Sutton (1425 – c. 1485) was an English knight who fought at the Wars of the Roses. His father was John Sutton, 1st Baron Dudley.

== Early life ==
Sutton was born in Dudley, the eldest son of John Sutton, 1st Baron Dudley, KG, and his wife Elizabeth, daughter of Sir John Berkeley.

== Career ==
He fought alongside his father during the conflict today known as the Wars of the Roses and was present at the battles of St Albans, Blore Heath, and Towton.

== Personal life ==
Edmund married Joyce Tiptoft, daughter of John Tiptoft, 1st Baron Tiptoft by Joyce de Cherleton(daughter of Edward Charleton, 5th Baron Cherleton), ultimately coheir to the baronies of Cherleton and Tiptoft. She transmitted to the Dudley family the quarterings of Tiptoft, Cherleton, Holland, and that of Edmund of Woodstock, youngest son of King Edward I of England. Together, they were the parents of:

- Edward Sutton (b. 1459) who succeeded his grandfather, John Sutton, as 2nd Baron Dudley; he married Cecily Willoughby, daughter of Sir William Willoughby and Joan Strangeways, and granddaughter of Katherine Neville, Duchess of Norfolk.

Edmund then (c. 1465) married Matilda, daughter of Thomas Lord Clifford and they were the parents of:

- Thomas Dudley of Yanwath. He married Sarah Thirkeld. They had issue:
  - Richard Dudley (1518–1593), who married Dorothy Sandford, daughter of Edmund Sandford of Askham, Cumbria.
  - John Dudley (d. 1580), who married Elizabeth Gardiner.

Edmund's exact date of death is not known, but was living on 6 July 1483 but died before his father (who died 30 September 1487).

=== Descendants ===
One of his descendants was Mayflower passenger Richard More (Mayflower Passenger).
