= Francis Chamberlain (governor) =

Governor of Guernsey

Sir Francis Chamberlain (1561–1570) was Governor of Guernsey.
