= Edward Leighton (died 1593) =

English politician

Sir Edward Leighton (c. 1525 – 10 September 1593) was an English politician, and a leading political figure in Shropshire in the late sixteenth century.

He was the eldest son of John Leighton of Wattlesborough Castle, Shropshire, and Joyce, daughter of Edward Sutton, 2nd Baron Dudley and Cecily Willoughby. Sir Thomas Leighton, Governor of Guernsey, was his younger brother. The Leightons were among the richest and most influential landowners in Shropshire. He was admitted in 1541 to Gray's Inn to study law. He succeeded to his father's estates in 1532. His mother remarried before 1538 Richard Lee, MP for Much Wenlock, who was his stepson's guardian.

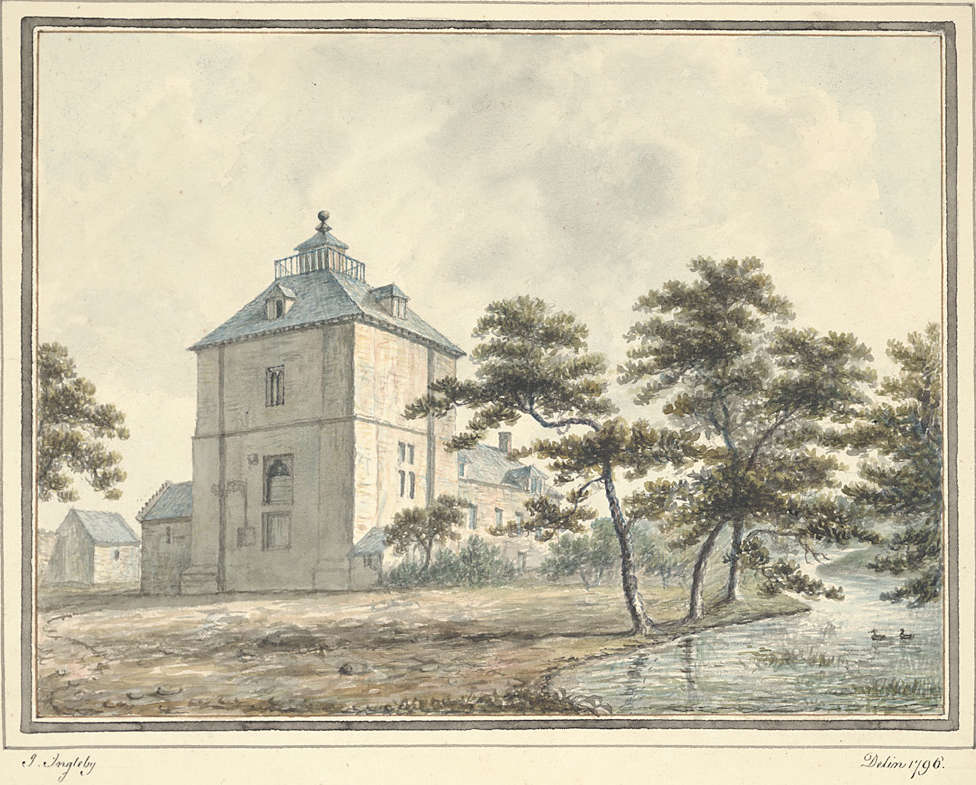
Wattlesborough, the Leighton family home from 1471 to 1711

He was appointed High Sheriff of Montgomeryshire for 1549 and 1591 and High Sheriff of Shropshire for 1567 and 1587. He was elected a Member (MP) of the Parliament of England for Shropshire in October 1553 and 1563. He became custos rotulorum of Shropshire in 1587. He was knighted in 1591. He was the dominant political figure in Shropshire in the 1580s, and showed great diligence in overseeing the trained bands. By 1590 however, he was described as being "old and feeble". He died three years later: "a man of much fame and countenance throughout the shire".

He married twice: firstly Elizabeth (née Edwards), the widow of a Mr. Meverell, and secondly Anne, the daughter of Paul Darrell of Lillingstone Dayrell, Buckinghamshire, with whom he had 4 sons and 3 daughters, including Thomas Leighton (died 1600), his eldest son and heir. They were the ancestors of the Leighton Baronets of Wattlesborough.
