= Le Châtelet =

- Commune
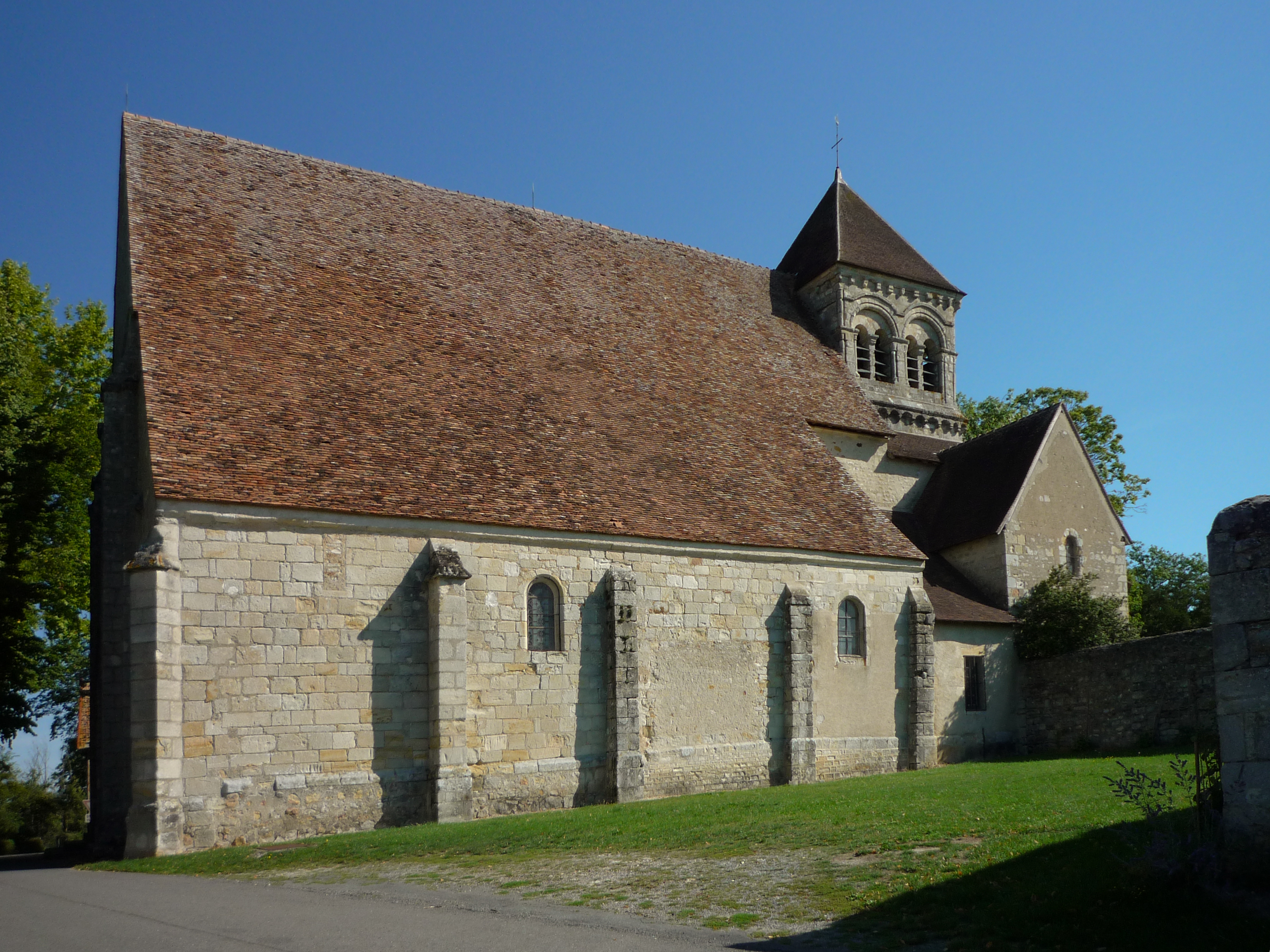
- The Church of Our Lady of Puy-Ferrand, in Le Châtelet

- Coat of arms
- Location of Le Châtelet
- Location within France Location within Centre-Val de Loire
- Coordinates: 46°38′33″N 2°17′02″E
- Country: France
- Region: Centre-Val de Loire
- Department: Cher
- Arrondissement: Saint-Amand-Montrond
- Canton: Châteaumeillant

Government
  - Mayor (2020–2026): Bernadette Perrot-Dubreuil
- Area^{1}: 32.8 km^{2} (12.7 sq mi)
- Elevation: 195 m (640 ft)
- Highest elevation: 276 m (906 ft)
- Lowest elevation: 186 m (610 ft)
- Population (2023): 920
  - Density: 28/km^{2} (73/sq mi)
- Time zone: UTC+01:00 (CET)
  - Summer (DST): UTC+02:00 (CEST)
- INSEE/Postal code: 18059 /18170
- ^{1} French Land Register data, which excludes lakes, ponds, glaciers > 1 km^{2} (0.386 sq mi or 247 acres) and river estuaries.

Le Châtelet (French pronunciation: [lə ʃatlɛ]) is a commune in the Cher department in the Centre-Val de Loire region of France.

== Geography ==
A farming area comprising a small town and a few hamlets situated by the banks of the small river Portefeuille, some 29 miles (47 km) south of Bourges, at the junction of the D 951, D 3 and the D 65 roads.

== Population ==
Historical population
Year	Pop.	±% p.a.
1968	1,226	—
1975	1,265	+0.45%
1982	1,151	−1.34%
1990	1,106	−0.50%
1999	1,104	−0.02%
2007	1,150	+0.51%
2012	1,083	−1.19%
2017	994	−1.70%
2023	920	−1.28%
Source: INSEE

== Sights ==
- The abbey church of Notre-Dame, dating from the twelfth century.
- The seventeenth century manorhouse de La Charnaye.
- Trace remains of a 12th-century castle.
- A pottery museum at the hamlet of Archers.

== See also ==
- Communes of the Cher department
