= Council Learned in the Law =

English Tudor tribunal

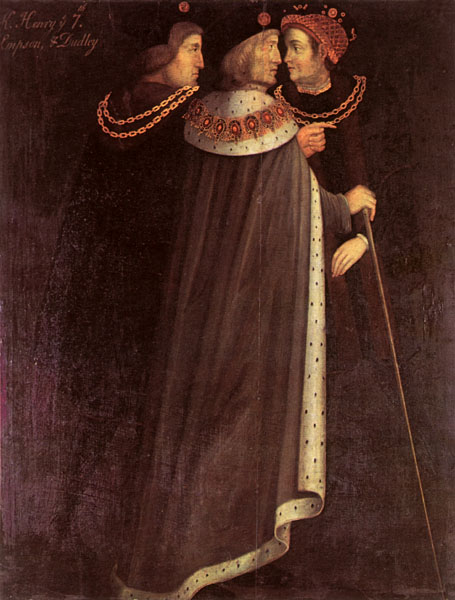
Richard Empson, King Henry VII and Edmund Dudley

The Council Learned in the Law was a highly controversial tribunal of Henry VII of England's reign.

== Creation ==
The brainchild of Sir Reginald Bray, the Council Learned was introduced in 1495 to defend Henry's position as a feudal landlord, maintain the King's revenue and exploit his prerogative rights. It dealt with the king's fiscal matters and enforced payments of debts. It proved to be much more efficient than the Exchequer. The council was a secondary department to the Star Chamber, but it was the Council Learned in Law that made the system of bonds and recognisances work so effectively. Following Bray's death in 1503, he was replaced with Edmund Dudley. Dudley, along with Empson, formed a feared combination of able bureaucrats who raised the extraction of money from the King's associates into a fine art and created many enemies amongst key advisors of the King.

== Abolition ==
By the end of Henry VII's reign, the Council Learned had become very unpopular, and after his death in 1509, it was abolished. Its most prominent councilors, Edmund Dudley and Sir Richard Empson, were imprisoned. Though evidence was scarce, both were convicted of treason, attainted and executed in 1510. The downfall of the pair brought rejoicing in the streets.

== Analysis ==
There is much controversy about the Council Learned in the Law because most existing sources date after 1509 when it had been officially condemned. Bray's associate, Empson, maintained a particularly ruthless approach that seemed to define the behavior of the Council. In the Tower, Dudley confessed to having issued harsher penalties than lawful in several cases, a statement which has given the Council a strongly negative connotation.

It bypassed the normal legal system since it was not a court and those summoned had no chance of appeal. It was an expression of the King's will and as such was as important for maintaining authority, as it was for raising finances.
