= Siege of Château Gaillard =

1204 battle during the French invasion of Normandy

- Part of the Invasion of Normandy by Philip II of France
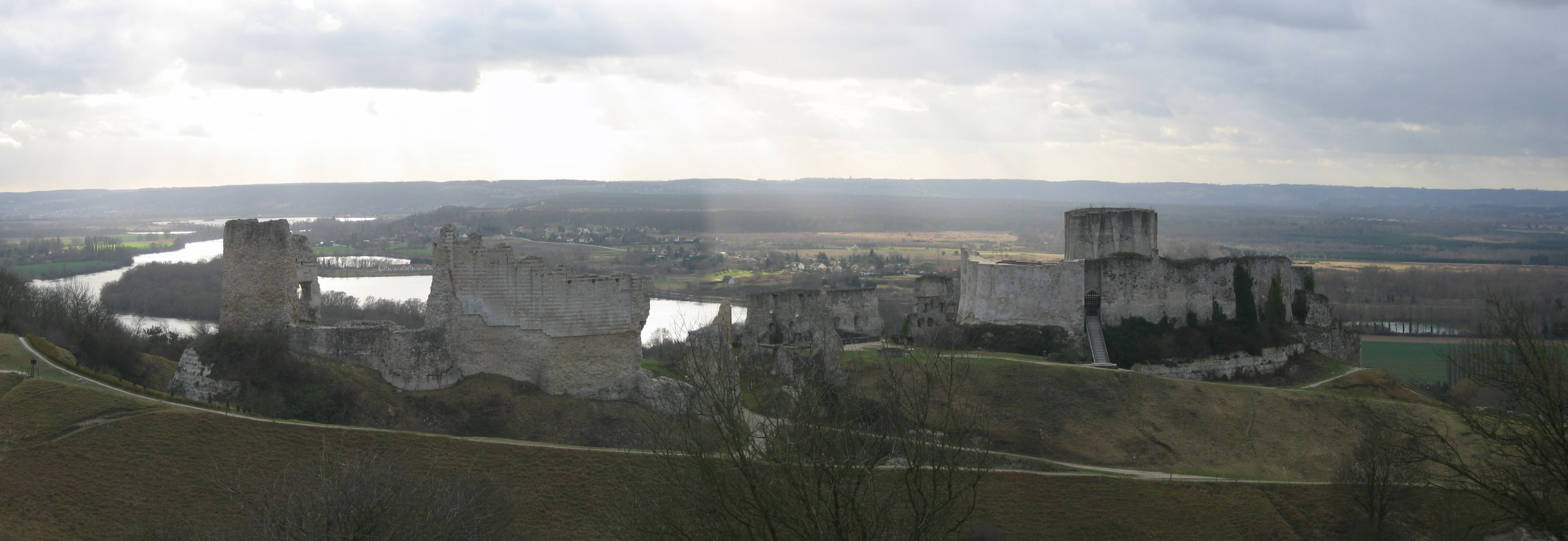
- The ruins of Château Gaillard fortress today. The outer bailey is shown at the front of the Château, while the inner bailey is the tower far to the right.
| Date | August 1203 – 6 March 1204 |
| Location | Château Gaillard, Normandy 49°14′16″N 1°24′12″E |
| Result | French victory: Normandy is formally annexed to the crown lands of France. |

Belligerents
| Kingdom of France | Duchy of Normandy; Kingdom of England |

Commanders and leaders
| Philip II of France | John of England; Roger de Lacy |

Strength
| 6,500–8,500 | Garrison: 100–200 Relieving force: 8,000–10,000 |

Casualties and losses
| Unknown | Unknown |

The siege of Château Gaillard was a part of the campaign of King Philip II of France to conquer Normandy from King John of England. The French king besieged Château Gaillard, a Norman fortress, for six months. The Anglo-Normans were beaten in the battle and the consequence was the fall of Normandy. The fortress was notable for having been a very technologically advanced castle at the time it was built, having several notable features in its construction such as having notably thick walls ranging from 2.5 to 3.5 meters in thickness and the first stone machicoulis ever constructed within France.

== Historical and Political Context ==
The siege of Château Gaillard cannot be properly understood without understanding the political climate which caused it. At the time of the siege, the territories that England held within France made them a technical vassal to the French King. By the time of the siege, King John of England held the lands of Normandy and Anjou in northern france, as well as Aquitaine in Southern France and being allied to Brittany, giving him effective control of the entirety of western France and forming the Angevin Empire. This relationship between Phillip and John would be enforced with the Treaty of Le Goulet in 1200, in which John would recognize Philip as his liege for all of Johns French territories and pay him twenty thousand, and in exchange Philip would recognize Johns as the rightful King of England. In this treaty, John would also give up his territories of Vexin, other than the fort of Chateau Galliard.

King Phillip II of France had ambitions to reassert these territories under the direct control of the French crown, and would spend a majority of his reign working towards that goal. But the largest roadblock in Phillip’s conquest of Normandy would be Château Gaillard. When the castle was built by Richard the Lionheart, it was one of the most technologically advanced castles on the continent, and served as both a valuable military installation and political symbol. The castle's location on an island overlooking the Seine River and several important river crossings would make it vital for anyone who wished to hold Normandy long term. As such, Phillips' desire to take the castle would be driven as much by military necessity as it would by his motivation to remove such a powerful symbol of English ownership of the lands. Any hope of a successful campaign hinged on the taking of Château Gaillard.

The Fall of Normandy would not come simply as a result of the actions of these two Kings, but also due to the role of their vessels. The Norman lords would play a key role in the collapse of the English crowns control of its Norman territories. Motivated by a fear of their castles falling under siege, their incomes eroding, and being forced to fight their neighbors and relatives, many of these nobles would become alienated from John, with some eventually revolting such as Count Robert of Sees.

Phillip would end up framing the conquest of the English held territories in france as a restoration of lands which had rightfully belonged to the French crown. After he would finally take back all of Normandy, Philip would notethat it had been 326 years since these lands were held the wealthy city of Rouen, Normandy’s capital, and that the land that had once been conquered and stolen from the Frankish King was in turn conquered by Phillip. As a result, the taking of the Château Gaillard was not only a military conquest of the English held lands within France, but a righting of past conquests by King Johns ancestor Rollo, restoring the land to its rightful French owners.

== Dispositions ==
King Philip wished to take control of Normandy. The castle at Château Gaillard was the key to the campaign, but he did not move against it directly. Instead he attacked a number of lesser castles in the surrounding area, effectively isolating Château Gaillard and ensuring that his operations were not threatened by nearby forces. Having prevented the relief of the castle, Philip then set about reducing it by siege. It would be a slow process, for Château Gaillard was a powerful fortress.

The defenders, under the command of Roger de Lacy, were of course tied to their base, the castle. De Lacy was in charge of denying Philip access to the river crossing which the castle guarded in order to prevent him from further campaigning into Normandy. They could come out to make local counterattacks, but for the most part they had to simply remain within the defenses and try to counter the moves that Philip made. The Anglo-Normans took the precaution of destroying the bridge, making a river crossing difficult.

Philip's forces first filled the ditch and broke through the palisade that defended it. This gave access to the castle proper, and it was necessary before any real operations could be undertaken. A bridge of boats, defended by ingenious floating towers mounted on boats, was set up to allow the French army to move back and forth. With his communications secure and access to the castle now gained, Philip began the work of reducing its defenses so if wars happened they would partake in easier battles for themselves.

== Relief attempts ==
The English sent two forces to relieve the castle. Under cover of darkness, one force was to row up the river and destroy the bridge of boats, which would cut the French forces in two. Meanwhile, a land force under William the Marshal was to attack one part of the French army which, with their backs to the river and unable to retreat, could be destroyed. The relief went awry.

The land attack led by Marshal was completely successful at first, but the French were able to retreat over the bridge of boats, as the river assault had not arrived in time to coordinate with him which had been key to the plan. In addition to troops and crews, the boats were heavily laden with supplies for the garrison, and took much longer than planned to row upstream against current and tide. The French were thus able to re-group and counter-attack, driving off the Anglo-Norman land forces. By the time the boats finally reached the bridge, the French were ready for them, and drove them off with considerable loss. John then abandoned his attempt to raise the siege.

One contemporary chronicler states that he was twenty miles away before the rest of his army realized he'd gone.

== Preparations ==
Even in the medieval period, the successful application of technology allowed a small force to achieve results out of proportion to the size of the unit. The tool in this case was Greek fire, a mixture of naphtha, pitch, and other ingredients that burst into flames when exposed to air. Strapping a number of clay canisters of flammable material to his body, a Frenchman named Galbert was able to swim to the island behind the castle and place his charges. The resulting inferno enabled the French to storm the island and complete the isolation of the castle.

The siege was going to be a long one, so Philip had housing in the form of crude huts for his troops. He ordered that the trenches be dug to defend the camp and that a "covered way" be constructed, a type of road dug into the trench which would have an earth rampart facing the castle to prevent defenders from shooting the besieging forces with arrows as they moved into position around the castle. He ordered that the tops of the hills be leveled off to provide good emplacements for them. They threw heavy rocks at the castle walls and hurled lighter projectiles meant to wound or kill the Anglo-Normans. Meanwhile, Roger de Lacy was concerned that his supplies might not last until a new relief effort could be mounted, because he had earlier allowed 2,000 refugees into the castle. He therefore sent all non-combatants out of the castle. This was a tactic commonly used during sieges as it meant fewer mouths for the defenders to feed. At first the French let the refugees through their siege lines, but after a time began to refuse them passage.

The result was several hundred people ended up trapped between the besiegers and the castle as siege engines and archers exchanged fire over their heads. There they remained for some time, starving until Philip relented and gave them food. His men let them through the lines and they dispersed.

King John of England made another attempt to break the siege, this time by raiding Brittany to draw off the French; during which time he razed Dol Cathedral. But Philip declined to give up his hard work to chase the English around the countryside, and remained where he was. Disheartened, King John took a ship for England and did not return. Throughout the winter of 1203/1204, the defenders made do with what they had as Philip's men received more supplies. They built belfries, mobile structures designed to protect men while they used rams or other equipment to attack walls and gates.

By February, the first assault was ready.

== Siege ==
=== Outer bailey falls ===
In order to get to the bailey, it was necessary to either breach the walls or open a gate. The latter was not likely, though it was possible to eventually batter through one. Philip's assault came from several directions. While siege engines and archers caused casualties on the walls, other engines and archers caused casualties among the defenders on the walls themselves, covered by belfries with a thick sloping roof to protect the men working inside.

Miners worked to undermine the walls by digging tunnels underneath the walls foundations then attempting to collapse them by burning the wooden pit-props which held the walls up. There were many dangers, ranging from early collapse of the tunnel to counter-mining by the enemy, which would result in a desperate close-quarters battle for possession of the tunnels.

Philip's assault on the outer bailey also included the most basic of castle assault techniques: escalade. Foot soldiers ran up to the walls with ladders, and began to climb them. Unfortunately, the ladders were too short. Men were under attack by the wall guards, unable to move due to the person behind them.

Some of the attackers were able to create footholds in the stonework, and some of them gained the wall. There was bitter hand-to-hand fighting. More men came up the walls. As more Frenchmen gained the outer bailey, it became obvious it could not be held. Those of the defenders who could flee back to the inner bailey prepared themselves for a new assault.

=== Central bailey falls ===
The cost in time and lives to gain the outer bailey had been high, but Philip was prepared for this. He decided to attack the last position; the second bailey. Philip's men climbed up a garderobe (toilet chute) and entered the chapel above. They then let their fellow soldiers into the central bailey. These soldiers would set the chapel door ablaze, and in the confusion this caused, open the gates to a larger force of soldiers who would then take the central baily.

=== Inner bailey falls ===
The inner bailey was surrounded by a moat, crossed by a natural rock bridge. Using the bridge as cover, the French took the inner bailey. The garrison surrendered on 6 March 1204. The only method of safely approaching the inner bailey without being showered in arrows involved the defenders mining under the bailey, using the bridge as cover, and then finally breaching the inner bailey. After the bailey was breached, the garrison would surrender on March 6th, 1204.

== Aftermath ==
Having captured Château Gaillard, Philip launched a campaign into English-held territory. Plantagenet prestige and morale had suffered badly. They had lost their fine castles, and their relief attempt had resulted in total defeat. Normandy did not put up much of a fight, and Philip then took ducal capital of Rouen. His campaign gained him several principalities, including Anjou and Touraine. Plantagenet holdings in France were diminishing. Château Gaillard's commander, Roger de Lacy, returned to England to begin work reinforcing his own castle at Pontefract.

In England, where King John was already unpopular, the fall of Château Gaillard meant the loss of even more prestige. A king who could not even keep control of his own castles and failed to come to the assistance of loyal lords holding out under siege in his name was considered a weak king. It is likely that the humiliation of Château Gaillard played a part in the decision of English barons to challenge King John. That in turn led to one of the most important events in English history: the sealing of Magna Carta.

== Historiographical Context ==
One of the earliest surviving accounts of the siege comes from a 13th century French chronicle, The Tales of a Minstrel of Reims, which was translated and edited by Randall T. Pippenger. It's a source which focuses primarily on the ideas of honor and the good moral conduct of Roger de Lacy and Phillip the second during the siege. It is a source which gives little mind to the actual military strategies used in the siege, and instead focuses on what the French people of the 13th century would have found important, that being the honor and conduct of those fighting on both sides. Later historians would focus much more on the construction of the castle and the military operations surrounding the siege.

In the book The Medieval Fortress we see a much more thorough analysis of Château Gaillard’s design and architectural innovations. This source talks about the innovations of castles design, being one of the most modern on the continent and certainly within France itself, and its use of many brand new technologies such as having the first stone machicoulis in France as well as walls designed to deflect artillery and siege weapons.

One of the most comprehensive modern texts on the sieges comes from Battles of the Medieval World, 1000 - 1500. This text gives an analysis of the military, architectural, and political aspects of the castle and its siege. It talks about how the taking of the castle was not only a necessary part of a successful military campaign within Normandy, but also struck a major blow to the political legitimacy of English rule within Normandy.
