= Edmund Dudley =

English administrator (died 1510)

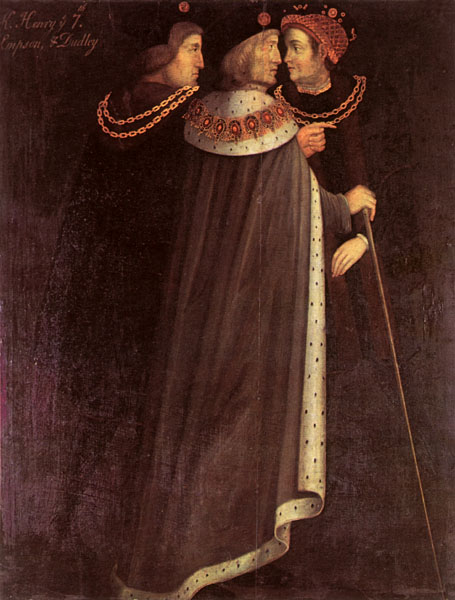
- Edmund Dudley (right), along with Henry VII of England (centre), and Sir Richard Empson (left)
- Born: c. 1462
- Died: 17 August 1510; Tower Hill, London
- Cause of death: Decapitation
- Resting place: Blackfriars, London
- Known for: English financial officer
- Notable work: The Tree of Commonwealth
- Spouse(s): Anne Windsor; Elizabeth Grey
- Children: Elizabeth Lady Stourton; John Dudley, Duke of Northumberland; Sir Andrew Dudley; Jerome Dudley
- Parent(s): Sir John Dudley of Atherington; Elizabeth Bramshott

Edmund Dudley (c. 1462 or 1471/1472 – 17 August 1510) was an English administrator and a financial agent of King Henry VII. He served as a leading member of the Council Learned in the Law, Speaker of the House of Commons and President of the King's Council. After the accession of Henry VIII in 1509, he was imprisoned in the Tower of London and executed the next year on a treason charge. While waiting for his execution he wrote The Tree of Commonwealth. Edmund Dudley was both the father of John Dudley, 1st Duke of Northumberland, Edward VI's second Regent and the grandfather of Robert Dudley, 1st Earl of Leicester, a favourite of Henry VIII's daughter, Elizabeth I.

== Career ==
Edmund Dudley was the son of Sir John Dudley of Atherington, West Sussex and a grandson of John Sutton, 1st Baron Dudley. After studying at Oxford, and at Gray's Inn, Dudley came under the notice of Henry VII, and is said to have been made a Privy Councillor at the early age of 23. In 1492, he helped to negotiate the Peace of Etaples with France and soon assisted the king in checking the lawlessness of the barons. He and his colleague Sir Richard Empson were prominent councillors of the Council Learned in the Law, a special tribunal of Henry VII's reign, which collected debts owed to the king, requested bonds as surety, and employed further financial instruments against high-born and wealthy subjects. Henry VII took a strong interest in these procedures and closely supervised the accounts of the two men.

Dudley was elected MP for Lewes, in 1491, and knight of the shire for Sussex, in 1495. In 1504, he was chosen as Speaker of the House of Commons. While collecting the king's money, Dudley amassed a great amount of wealth for himself, which resulted in estates in Sussex, Dorset, and Lincolnshire. A 1509 inventory of his house in Candelwykstrete, London, gave the earliest reference to window curtains.

When Henry VII died in April 1509, Dudley was imprisoned, and charged with the crime of constructive treason. Dudley's nominal crime was that during the last illness of Henry VII he had ordered his friends to assemble in arms in case the king died, but the real reason for his charge was his unpopularity stemming from his financial transactions. He was attainted and made preparations to escape from the Tower of London. He gave up his plan, though, when parliament did not confirm his attainder, which led him to believe that he would be pardoned. However while in prison he declared a will. Dudley and his colleague Empson were executed on 17 August 1510 on Tower Hill.

During his imprisonment, Dudley sought to gain the favour of King Henry VIII by writing a treatise in support of absolute monarchy, called The Tree of Commonwealth. It may, however, never have reached the king. Several manuscript editions survive: the earliest was possibly commissioned by Dudley's son, John Dudley, Duke of Northumberland; while the second oldest was made by John Stow in 1563 for Dudley's grandson, Robert Dudley.

== Marriages and issue ==
Edmund Dudley married twice:

- First, in about 1494, Anne Windsor, sister of Andrew Windsor, 1st Baron Windsor, by whom he had a daughter:
  - Elizabeth Dudley (born c. 1500), who married William Stourton, 7th Baron Stourton.
- Secondly, between 1500 and 1503, Elizabeth Grey (c. 1480–1525), a daughter of Edward Grey, 1st Viscount Lisle (died 1492). Three sons were born to this marriage:
  - John Dudley, 1st Duke of Northumberland (1504 – 22 August 1553)
  - Andrew Dudley (c. 1507–1559)
  - Jerome Dudley (died after 1555), destined for the Church by his father, yet was mentally or physically incapacitated.

== Notes ==
Political offices
Preceded by Sir Thomas Englefield	Speaker of the House of Commons; 1503	Succeeded by Sir Thomas Englefield
