= List of governors of Guernsey =

The Bailiwick of Guernsey is a British crown dependency off the coast of France.

Holders of the post of Governor of Guernsey, until the role was abolished in 1835. Since then, only Lieutenant-Governors have been appointed (see Lieutenant Governor of Guernsey).

A roll of honour of the Governors and Lieutenant Governors of Guernsey from 1198 to date has been installed at Government House.

== 12th century ==
- Julian de la Plaque, (Prince Pracle) (1111)
- Walter Duncker, (1154)
- Peter Cornet, (1167)
- John, Count of Mortain (1198)
- Sir William Orseth, (1199)

== 13th century ==
- George Ballizon, (Gregory Balizon) (1203)
- Peter de Preaux (1206)
- Geoffrey de Lucy, (1225-6)
- Richard Grey, (1226)
- William de St John, (1227)
- Arnauldus de St Amand and Philip de Carteret, (1232)
- Philip de Albimar and William St John,
- Prince Edward, in appanage, (1271)
- Steven Wallard, (Stephen Waller) (1284)
- Otton de Grandson, (1290)
- Henry de Cobham, (1299)

== 14th century ==
- Sir Peter Cornet, (who began to build Castle Cornet) (1312)
- Sir William Oethfinde,
- Edmund Rose,
- Otton de Grandson,(1323)
- John de Roches, (1330)
- William de Montagou and Henry de Ferrure, (1335)
- Thomas de Ferrariis, (1339)
- Thomas Hampton, (1342)
- John Mantaners, (1350)
- Thomas Holland (1356)
- Sir Edmund de Chene, (1360)
- Walter Huet, (1372)
- Edmund Rose and Hugh Calvilegh, (1374)
- John Golafre, (1388)
- Edmund, Earl of Rutland, (1397)

== 15th century ==
- Edward, 2nd Duke of York (also known as Edward of Norwich), in appanage (1415)
- John, 1st Duke of Bedford (1430)
- Humphrey, Duke of Gloucester (1435)
- The 1st Duke of Warwick (1446)
- William Bertram and Nicholas Hault, (1447)
- John Nanfan, (1453)
- Geffrey Wallifly, (1470)
- Sir John Tichefilde,(1482)
- Duarte Brandão (1482–1485)
- Edward Weston (1486–1509)
- John Avril, (1488)
- Sir William Weston,

== 16th century ==
- Sir Richard Weston, (1509–1541)
- Sir Francis Weston (1533–1536) (co-governor with his father, Sir Richard Weston)
- Sir Richard Weston, reverted to sole governor until his death, (1536–1541)
- Sir Richard Long, (1541–1545)
- Sir Peter Mewtis, (1545–1553)
- Sir Leonard Chamberlain, (1553–1561)
- Sir Francis Chamberlain, (1561–1570)
- Sir Thomas Leighton, (1570–1609)

== 17th century ==
- The 1st Baron Carew, (1610–1621)
- The 1st Earl of Danby, (1621–1644)
- The 2nd Earl of Warwick, (1643–1644)
- Sir Peter Osborne, (1644–1649)
- The 1st Baron Percy of Alnwick (1649–1650)
- Colonel Alban Coxe, (1649–1650)
- Colonel John Bingham, (1651–1660)
- Major Henry Wanseye (1660)
- Sir Hugh Pollard, (1660–1662)
- The 1st Baron Hatton of Kirby, (1662–1665)
- Colonel Sir Jonathan Atkins, (1665–1670)
- The 1st Viscount Hatton of Grendon, (1670–1706)
- Colonel Mordaunt, (1697)

== 18th century ==
- General Charles Churchill (1706–1714)
- Giles Spencer, (1711)
- Lieutenant-General Daniel Harvey (1715–1732)
- Lewis Dollon, (1726)
- The 2nd Earl of Cholmondeley (1732–1733)
- Major-General Richard Sutton (1733–1737)
- Field Marshal The Marquis de Montandre (1737–1739)
- The 1st Earl of Pomfret (1739–1742)
- General The 7th Duke of Somerset (known as the 1st Baron Percy until 1748; 1742–1750)
- Field Marshal Sir John Ligonier (1750–1752)
- General The 1st Earl De La Warr (1752–1766)
- Sir Richard Lyttelton (1766–1770)
- Field Marshal The 1st Baron Amherst (known as Sir Jeffery [sic] Amherst until 1776; 1770–1797)
- General The 1st Earl Grey (1797–1807)

== 19th century ==
- Lieutenant-General The 11th Earl of Pembroke and 8th Earl of Montgomery (1807–1827)
- General Sir William Keppel (1827–1834)
- position of Governor abolished in 1835

== See also ==
- List of bailiffs of Guernsey
- List of lieutenant governors of Guernsey
- List of bailiffs of Jersey
- List of lieutenant governors of Jersey
