= Thomas Leighton (governor) =

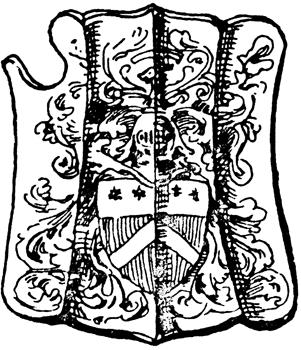
Tournshield with coat of arms of Sir Thomas Leighton

Sir Thomas Leighton (c. 1530–1610) was an English soldier and politician. He served as the Governor of Guernsey and Jersey from 1570 to 1609.

== Life ==
Sir Thomas was knighted in 1579 during the reign of Elizabeth I. He was from Feckenham, Worcestershire, England, born to John Leighton of Wattlesborough and Joyce Sutton, daughter of Edward Sutton, 2nd Baron Dudley. His brother Sir Edward Leighton (died 1593) was the ancestor of the Leighton baronets of Wattlesborough. The Leightons were among the most influential families in Shropshire, and Edward was the dominant figure in local government in Shropshire in the 1580s.

Leighton was unpopular as governor. He developed the defensive capabilities of Castle Cornet, but to do so he imposed heavy taxes on the islanders. In 1588 he was sent as a diplomat to Henry III of France, and then served at the camp at Tilbury in the defensive moves against the Spanish Armada. For some years from 1595 he employed Thomas Cartwright as chaplain.

Leighton served as Member of Parliament for Worcestershire in 1601. He died in Guernsey.

== Family ==
Leighton married Elizabeth Knollys (cousin once removed of Elizabeth I) in 1578. They had two daughters, Elizabeth and Anne Leighton. Anne married Sir John St. John, 1st Baronet of Lidiard-Tregoze The couple also had one son; the father's namesake Thomas Leighton (born 1584), who married Mary, daughter of Edward la Zouche, 11th Baron Zouche.

Their daughter Elizabeth married Sherrington Talbot.
