= Countess of Pembroke =

Title in the Peerage of England

Countess of Pembroke is a title that has been borne by several women throughout history, this is a comprehensive list of them:

== First Creation ==
- Isabel de Beaumont (c.1102/07–1172), wife of Gilbert de Clare, 1st Earl of Pembroke.
- Aoife MacMurrough (c.1145 –1188), wife of Richard de Clare, 2nd Earl of Pembroke; Irish noblewoman, Princess of Leinster.
- Isabel de Clare (1172–1220), wife of William Marshal, 1st Earl of Pembroke, and Countess of Pembroke in her own right (suo jure).

== Second Creation ==
- Eleanor of England (1215-1275), wife of William Marshal, 2nd Earl of Pembroke
- Gervasia de Dinan (c.1190–1238/39), wife of Richard Marshal, 3rd Earl of Pembroke; heir to the Breton lands of her father.
- Marjorie of Scotland (c.1200–1244), wife of Gilbert Marshal, 4th Earl of Pembroke and daughter of William the Lion.
- Margaret de Quincy (c.1206–1266), wife of Walter Marshal, 5th Earl of Pembroke and Countess of Lincoln in her own right (suo jure).
- Matilda de Bohun (d.1252), wife of Ansel Marshal. Ansel died before being able to swear homage and thus never receiving his inheritance; as a result the male line of the Marshal family died out and Matilda never received her dower.

== Third Creation ==
- Joan de Munchensi (c.1230–1307), wife of William de Valence, 1st Earl of Pembroke; countess in her own right (suo jure) following the division of the Marshal estate between seventeen people but her husband was entrusted with the custody of her lands.
- Mary de St Pol (c.1303–1377), wife of Aymer de Valence, 2nd Earl of Pembroke who was only formally recognised as Earl following his mother's death.

== Fourth Creation ==
- Agnes Mortimer (1317–1368), wife of Laurence Hastings, 1st Earl of Pembroke.
- Margaret of England (1346–1361), 1st wife of John Hastings, 2nd Earl of Pembroke; daughter of King Edward III and Philippa of Hainault.
- Anne Manny (1355–1384), second wife to John Hastings, 2nd Earl of Pembroke; daughter of Walter Manny, Baron Manny and Margaret, Duchess of Norfolk.
- Elizabeth of Lancaster (1363–1426), 1st wife of John Hastings, 3rd Earl of Pembroke. The marriage was unconsummated as John was 8; it was subsequently annulled after Elizabeth had a child with John Holland whom she later married.
- Philippa Mortimer (1375–1400), second wife of John Hastings, 3rd Earl of Pembroke. He died in a jousting accident at the age of 17; they had no children and the lands were reverted to the crown.

== Fifth Creation ==
- Jacqueline of Hainaut (1401–1436), 1st wife of Humphrey, Duke of Gloucester who had been granted the Earldom of Pembroke and was the son of King Henry IV of England. Their marriage was annulled by Pope Martin V as Jacqueline's previous marriage to John IV of Brabant had been annulled by the antipope and thus declared invalid.
- Eleanor Cobham (c.1400–1452), second wife of Humphrey, Duke of Gloucester. She was convicted and was sentenced to life imprisonment. Neither of Gloucester's marriages produced any issue.

== Sixth Creation ==
- Alice Chaucer (c.1404–1475), wife of William de la Pole, 1st Duke of Suffolk who had been given the earldom due to being a favourite of Henry VI; he was executed and his lands reverted to the crown after the Yorkists came to power.

== Seventh Creation ==
- Catherine Woodville (1458–1497), wife of Jasper Tudor, Duke of Bedford who was made Earl of Pembroke in 1452 but lost his title to the senior William Herbert due to being a Lancastrian. His title was reinstated in 1485 by his nephew Henry VII, the same year Catherine Woodville married him. They had no issue.

== Eighth Creation ==
- Anne Devereux (c.1430–c.1486), wife of William Herbert, 1st Earl of Pembroke.
- Mary Woodville (c.1456–1481), wife of William Herbert, 2nd Earl of Pembroke. Title attainted in 1479 and given back to Jasper Tudor a few years later.

== Ninth Creation ==
- Anne Parr (1515–1552), wife of William Herbert, 1st Earl of Pembroke and sister of Queen consort Catherine Parr.
- Mary Sidney (1561–1621), wife of Henry Herbert, 2nd Earl of Pembroke; one of the first English women to achieve a major reputation for her literary works, translations and literary patronage.
- Mary Talbot (c.1594–1649), wife of William Herbert, 3rd Earl of Pembroke.
- Anne Clifford (1590–1678), wife of Philip Herbert, 4th Earl of Pembroke; she spent most of her life fighting for her father's estate.
- Penelope Naunton (1620–1647), 1st wife of Philip Herbert, 5th Earl of Pembroke.
- Catherine Villiers (d.1678), second wife of Philip Herbert, 5th Earl of Pembroke.
- Henrietta de Kéroualle (1657–1728), wife of Philip Herbert, 7th Earl of Pembroke. He was convicted twice of murder and is suspected of a third.
- Margaret Sawyer (d. 1706) 1st wife of Thomas Herbert, 8th Earl of Pembroke.
- Barbara Slingsby (c.1668–1721), second wife of Thomas Herbert, 8th Earl of Pembroke.
- Mary Howe (b. after 1698), third wife of Thomas Herbert, 8th Earl of Pembroke.
- Mary FitzWilliam (b.1707), wife of Henry Herbert, 9th Earl of Pembroke.
- Elizabeth Spencer (1737–1831), wife of Henry Herbert, 10th Earl of Pembroke; daughter of Charles Spencer, third Duke of Marlborough and Elizabeth Trevor.
- Elizabeth Beauclerk (1766–1793), wife of George Herbert, 11th Earl of Pembroke.
- Catherine Herbert born Yekaterina Semyonovna Vorontsova (1783–1856), Russian born wife of George Herbert, 11th Earl of Pembroke. Daughter of the Russian Ambassador Semyon Vorontsov, niece to Imperial Chancellor Alexander Vorontsov and a personal friend to Catherine the Great.
- Ottavia Spinelli di Laurino, Princess of Butera (d.1857) wife of Robert Herbert, 12th Earl of Pembroke and daughter of the Duke of Laurino. They married in secret and Robert's father disapproved of it and successfully managed to have Sicilian authorities separate them and bar them from meeting each other. When Robert returned to England, his father convinced him to abandon his wife.
- Gertrude Chetwynd-Talbot (1840–1906), wife of George Herbert, 13th Earl of Pembroke and daughter of Henry Chetwynd-Talbot, 18th Earl of Shrewsbury.
- Beatrix Louisa (1859–1944), wife of Sidney Herbert, 14th Earl of Pembroke.
- Beatrice Eleanor Paget (1883–1973), wife of Reginald Herbert, 15th Earl of Pembroke.
- Mary Dorothea Hope (1903–1995), wife of Sidney Herbert, 16th Earl of Pembroke.
- Claire Pelly (1943–present) first wife of Henry Herbert, 17th Earl of Pembroke. They divorced in 1988.
- Miranda Kendall Oram (1962–present), second wife of Henry Herbert, 17th Earl of Pembroke.
- Victoria Bullough (1985–present), wife of William Herbert, 18th Earl of Pembroke and the current Countess of Pembroke.

== Other ==
- Anne Boleyn was made "Marchioness of Pembroke" in 1532. The title became extinct upon her execution.
