= Margaret, Countess of Pembroke =

English princess (1346–1361)

Margaret of England
- Countess of Pembroke
- Born: 20 July 1346; Windsor, Berkshire, England
- Died: c. 1 October – 25 December 1361 (aged 15)
- Burial: Abingdon Abbey
- Spouse: John Hastings, 2nd Earl of Pembroke (m. 1359)
- House: Plantagenet
- Father: Edward III of England
- Mother: Philippa of Hainault

Margaret of England (20 July 1346 – October/December 1361) was a royal princess born in Windsor, the daughter of King Edward III of England and his consort, Philippa of Hainault. She was also known as Margaret of Windsor.

== Marriage ==
Margaret's first marriage prospect was Albert III of Austria but this changed due to politics at the time. A few years later she was affianced to John of Blois, son of Charles of Blois and rival of John V of Brittany to the Breton throne; however, this engagement was abandoned because her sister Mary was already betrothed to John IV of Brittany.

Margaret was raised with John Hastings, 2nd Earl of Pembroke, son of Laurence Hastings, 1st Earl of Pembroke, and his wife Agnes, the daughter of Roger Mortimer (the favourite of Isabella of France). As children they had a close companionship. On 13 May 1359, she became the wife of John Hastings in the same week as her brother John of Gaunt, 1st Duke of Lancaster, married Blanche of Lancaster, in Reading.

== Early death ==
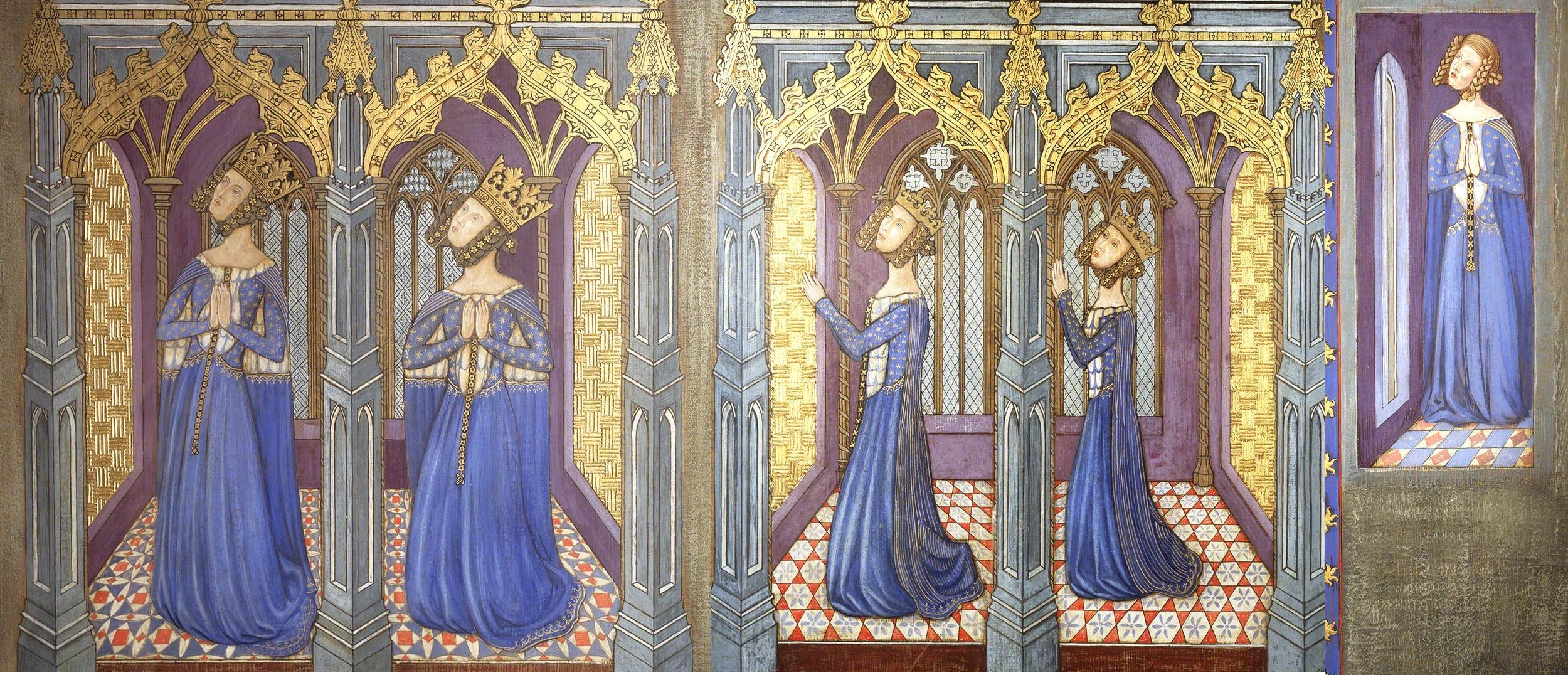
Margaret alongside her sisters and mother

Two years later, Margaret died, and was buried in Abingdon Abbey. The exact date and cause of her death is unknown; she was last mentioned as living on 1 October 1361.

== Bibliography ==
- Green, Mary Anne Everett (1857). Lives of the Princesses of England Vol. III. London. pp. 295–301.
- Weir, Alison (1996). Britain's Royal Families: The Complete Genealogy. London: Pimlico. ISBN 0-7126-7448-9. OCLC 35042093.
