= Fillongley =

Village and civil parish in Warwickshire, England

Coordinates: 52.482°N 1.588°W

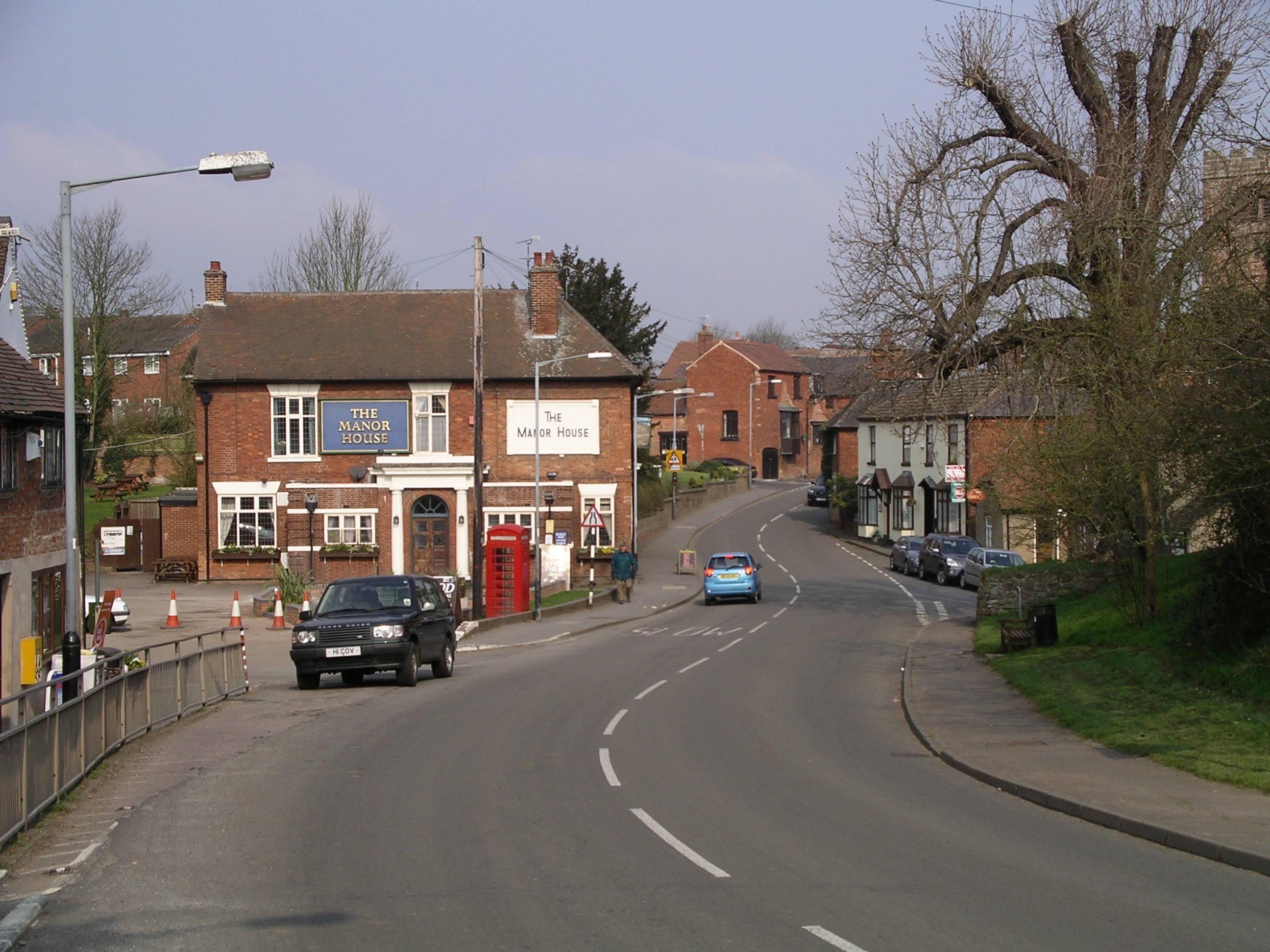
- The B4098 road

- Location within Warwickshire
- Population: 1,569 (2021)
- OS grid reference: SP279872
- Civil parish: Fillongley
- District: North Warwickshire
- Shire county: Warwickshire
- Region: West Midlands
- Country: England
- Sovereign state: United Kingdom
- Post town: Coventry
- Postcode district: CV7
- Website: Fillongley Community Website

Fillongley, listed as Fillungeleye in 1135, is a village and civil parish in the North Warwickshire district of Warwickshire in England. The village is centred on the crossroads of the B4102 (which connects Solihull and Nuneaton) and the B4098 (connecting Coventry and Tamworth). The population of the parish taken at the 2021 census was 1,569. It is situated 5.5 miles (8.9 km) west of Bedworth, 6.5 miles (10.5 km) south-west of Nuneaton and an equal distance north-west of Coventry. Fillongley is further from the sea than any other settlement in Great Britain, being 75 miles (120 km) from the nearest coast.

== History ==
In medieval times, there were two castles. These might not have existed at the same time, and neither survived into the 16th century. The earliest was a ring earthwork of King Stephen's time. The second was probably a fortified manor house, held by the de Hastings family. Henry de Hastings (c. 1235 – c. 1268) was Constable of Kenilworth Castle in 1265–1266 for Simon de Montford during the latter's conflict with King Henry III. In February 1300/1 his son John Hastings (1262–1313), Baron Bergavenny, had licence to crenellate his "manor and town of Fillongley in Warwickshire". He was buried at the Greyfriars in Coventry. The manor house was still standing during the reign of Edward III (1327–1377), but was unoccupied by the de Hastings. It later passed to the Beauchamp family holding the Earl of Warwick title.

== Church ==
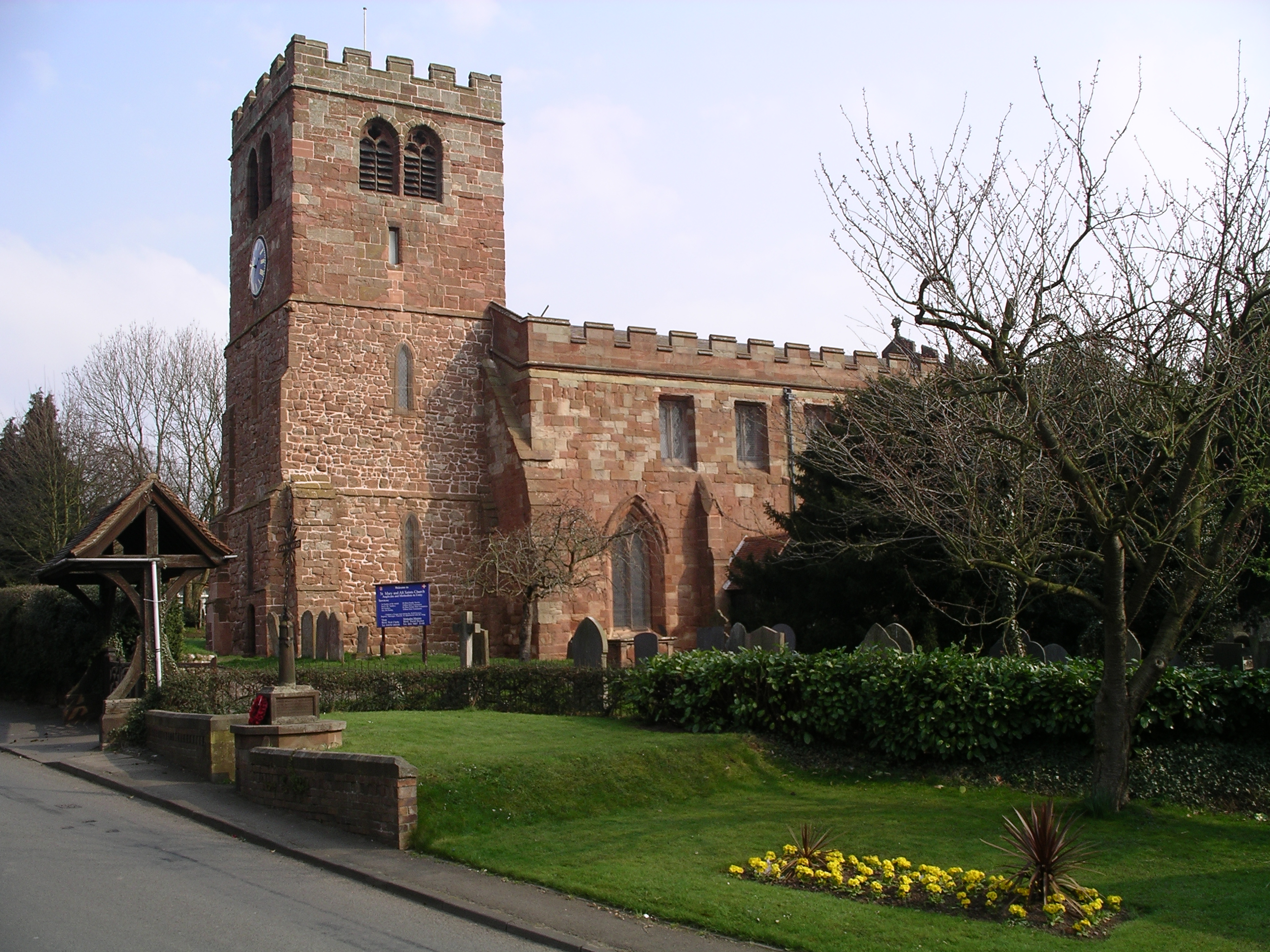
St Mary's and All Saints Church

The parish church of St Mary and All Saints dates from the 12th century but the bell tower was a later addition. Inside are examples of 14th-century stained glass.

Among the graves is that of Isaac Pearson, the uncle of the Victorian novelist George Eliot, who lived in Arbury nearby. The church graveyard is also reported to have a ghost, a lady wearing a long dress who appears on misty nights.

== Other buildings ==
Fillongley Hall was built in the mid 13th century and was destroyed in a fire in 1929, with rumours at the time suggesting that this was purposeful arson by the owner to claim insurance money and settle his debts. There was a medieval gallows located near to Fillongley Old Hall.

There were several historic public houses in Fillongley, most of which are now closed, including The Butcher's Arms, The Cock Inn, The Durham Ox, The Red Lion, and The Saracen's Head. The Bell Inn in the centre of the village operated as a public house, village bank and post office. Fillongley also had a bakery, blacksmiths, butchers shop, cobblers, crafts factory, saddlers, village shop, watermill (now converted to a house) and windmill.

During the Second World War, an anti aircraft battery operated from Fillongley, near to Beckfield Lodge Farm, and the site has since been converted to stables.
