= John Hastings, 2nd Earl of Pembroke =

English nobleman and soldier (1347–1375)

John Hastings
- Earl of Pembroke
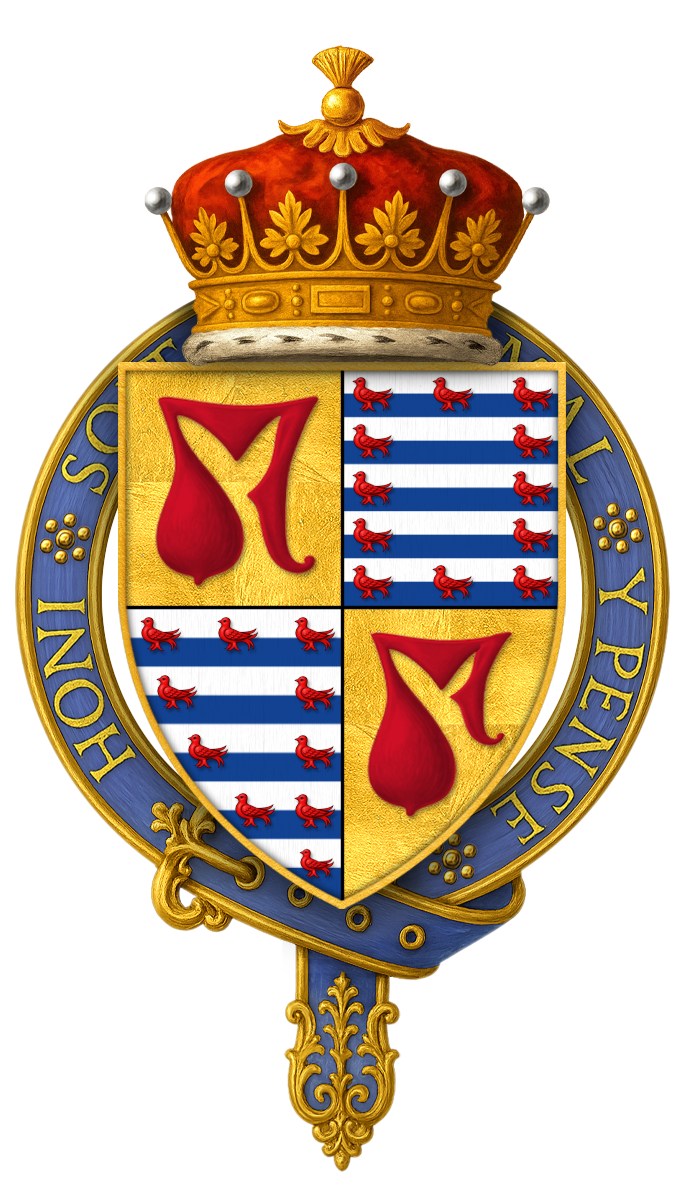
- Coat of arms of John Hastings
- Born: 29 August 1347; Sutton Valence, England
- Died: 16 April 1375 (aged 27); Picardy, France
- Noble family: Hastings
- Spouses: Margaret of England (m. 1359; died 1361) Anne Mauny (m. 1368)
- Issue: John Hastings, 3rd Earl of Pembroke
- Father: Laurence Hastings, 1st Earl of Pembroke
- Mother: Agnes Mortimer

John Hastings, 2nd Earl of Pembroke (29 August 1347 – 16 April 1375), was a fourteenth-century English nobleman and soldier. He also held the titles of Baron Abergavenny and Lord of Wexford. He was born in Sutton Valence, the son of Laurence Hastings, 1st Earl of Pembroke, and Agnes Mortimer, Countess of Pembroke. His father died when John Hastings was around one year old, and he became a ward of King Edward III while remaining in his mother's care. The King arranged for John to marry Edward's daughter Margaret in 1359, which drew John into the royal family. However, Margaret died two years later. John Hastings inherited his father's earldom, subsidiary titles and estates in 1368. The same year, he made a second marriage, to Anne, daughter of Walter, Lord Mauny. The following year, Pembroke began the career in royal service that continued for the rest of his life.

The Hundred Years' War had recently resumed in France, and in 1369 Pembroke journeyed to Aquitaine. There he took part in a sequence of raids, sieges, and counter-measures against the French, with both notable successes and failures. The latter were compounded by his apparent inability to work alongside the famed soldier Sir John Chandos, who, although head of the King's forces there, was far below Pembroke in rank. He was, however, far above Pembroke in ability, and his subsequent death led to even more problems for Pembroke in France. A couple of years later, the Earl was summoned to Parliament and returned to England. There, perhaps exasperated by the political failures of the King's ecclesiastical ministers, or by their self-indulgence in office, he was responsible for forcing them from power.

In 1372 Pembroke returned to France with a small fleet, intending to raise a new army in Aquitaine. His arrival had been anticipated by the Castilian navy (whose kingdom was then allied to France). Pembroke, outnumbered and outgunned, was forced to fight at the Battle of La Rochelle, where he went down to a crushing defeat. Captured and taken to Castile, he was imprisoned in harsh conditions. It took three years for a large ransom to be negotiated, but in 1375, he was finally released. Returning to England through France, he was taken ill near Paris and died before reaching home. He was 27 years old. His wife survived him, as did a son, born in 1372, whom Pembroke had never seen; (Note: The antiquarian William Dugdale relates the curse that had supposedly been on those that held the earldom of Pembroke ever since Aymer de Valence, Earl of Pembroke, had supported the execution of Thomas, Earl of Lancaster, in 1322. It was said, says Dugdale, that "none of the succeeding Earls of Pembroke ever Saw his father, nor any Father of them took delight in seeing his Child.") also named John, he would eventually inherit the earldom. Pembroke was buried in Hereford in April 1375.

== Background and youth ==
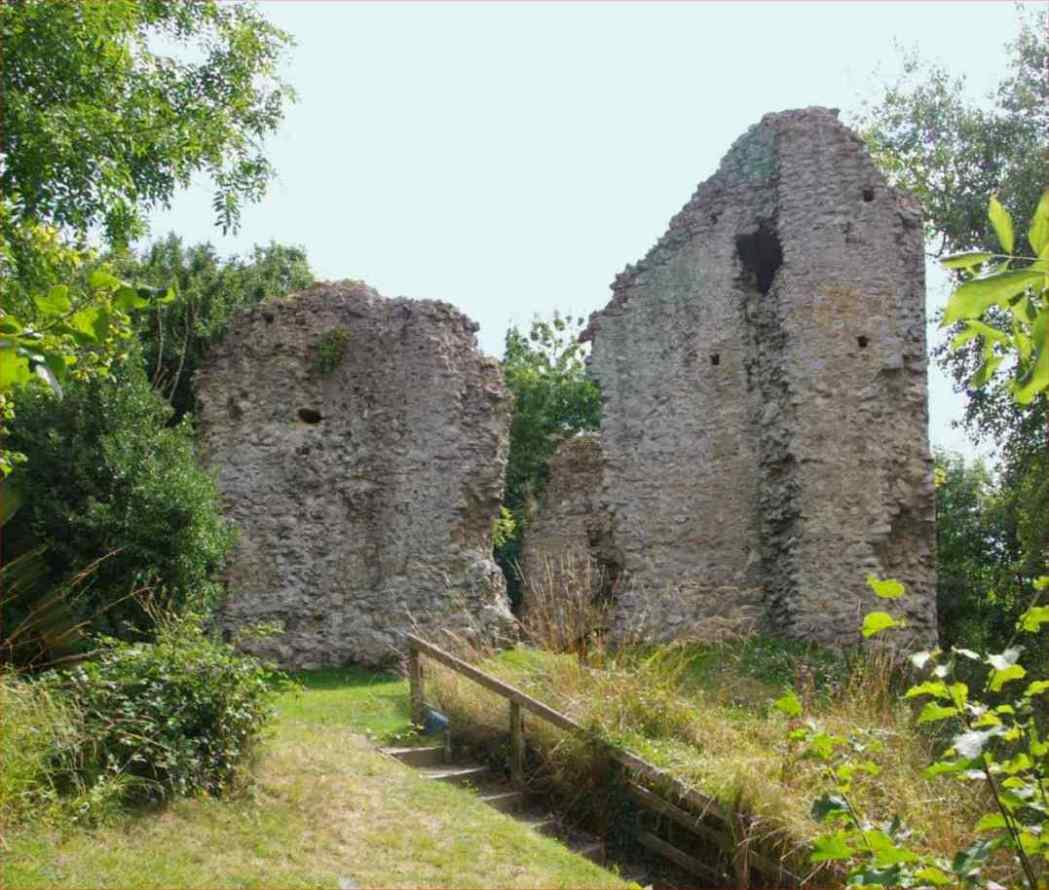
Sutton Valence Castle

John Hastings was born on 29 August 1347 at Sutton Valence Castle, Kent and baptised that day in the local church, St Mary the Virgin. He was the only son and heir of Laurence Hastings, 1st Earl of Pembroke, by his wife Agnes, who was the third daughter of Roger Mortimer, 1st Earl of March. His father's mother, Juliana Leybourne, was enormously wealthy. Laurence Hastings died a year to the day after his son's birth, and John remained in the care of his mother, while becoming a ward of the King, Edward III (r. 1327–1377). In December 1348 his mother was granted the large sum of 100 marks a year for his maintenance and upkeep. She soon remarried, but her second husband, John Haklyt, was himself dead by 1357. The wardship of Laurence's estates was divided between his wife Agnes; his mother, John's grandmother (Juliana Leybourne, who later married the Earl of Huntingdon); and Sir John Grey of Ruthin.

In 1362, John began receiving grants of the manors previously held by his father. In 1364, he received the wardship of all his father's lands in England and Wales, and was appointed keeper of all his grandmother's dower lands. He attended the King's midwinter revels in December 1366 as part of the extended royal family. Hastings proved his age to the King – and thus his legal majority – on 12 September 1368. The following year, he paid homage to Edward and pledged his fealty; in return, he was granted the rights to all his English inheritance. The following month, he entered into those estates his father had held in Ireland and Wales. Like his father, as well as Earl of Pembroke he also styled himself Lord of Wexford and of Abergavenny. He became a favourite of the King.

=== Marriages ===
Pembroke was contracted to marry twice. His first marriage was arranged by Edward III to his 12-year-old fourth daughter, Margaret. The betrothal ceremony took place on 19 May 1359 in the Queen's Chapel, Palace of Westminster. This was an important match for Pembroke; the royal connection meant that, while his wife lived, Pembroke was referred to as the King's son in official records, as his marriage had brought him directly into the royal family. Margaret died around 1 October 1361, probably of plague, and was buried in Abingdon Abbey. The marriage was never solemnised and they had no children. (Note: Historian Elisabeth van Houts has described medieval marriage as a two-part process, particularly among the nobility. First, a male relative to the bride-to-be would make overtures for his, for example, daughter's hand to a prospective suitor. If an agreement was made, a contract was entered into by the two families via the betrothal of the two children to each other. This would be followed – "at some later stage" – by an official wedding ceremony, known as the traditio pullae, or transfer of the female. Only the latter was a religious ceremony, and it was only after this that any financial elements of the contract were fulfilled, such as payment of the bride's dowry to the new husband. However, contemporaries often did not distinguish between the betrothal and the wedding, and appear to have considered them equally important processes. It was common for a long period of time to elapse between the two ceremonies if the parties were very young.)

Pembroke's second marriage to a cousin of the King also reinforced his position in the royal circle. In July 1368 Pembroke married Anne Mauny (24 July 1355 – 3 April 1384). She was the daughter of the famous soldier Walter, Lord Mauny, and Margaret, daughter of Thomas, Earl of Norfolk, and later Duchess of Norfolk in her own right. As Anne was a cousin of Pembroke's first wife a papal dispensation was sought for this marriage and received from the Archbishop of Canterbury on 1 July 1368. In return, the Pope requested that the Earl donate 1,000 gold florins towards the repair of Saint Paul's, Rome. Pembroke was twenty at his second marriage; his bride was thirteen. Pembroke left her in England while he carved out a career for himself in France on royal service. When his father-in-law died, Pembroke sent two of his knights to take possession of all of Mauny's estates in Hainaut (in what is now southern Belgium).

== Campaigning in France ==
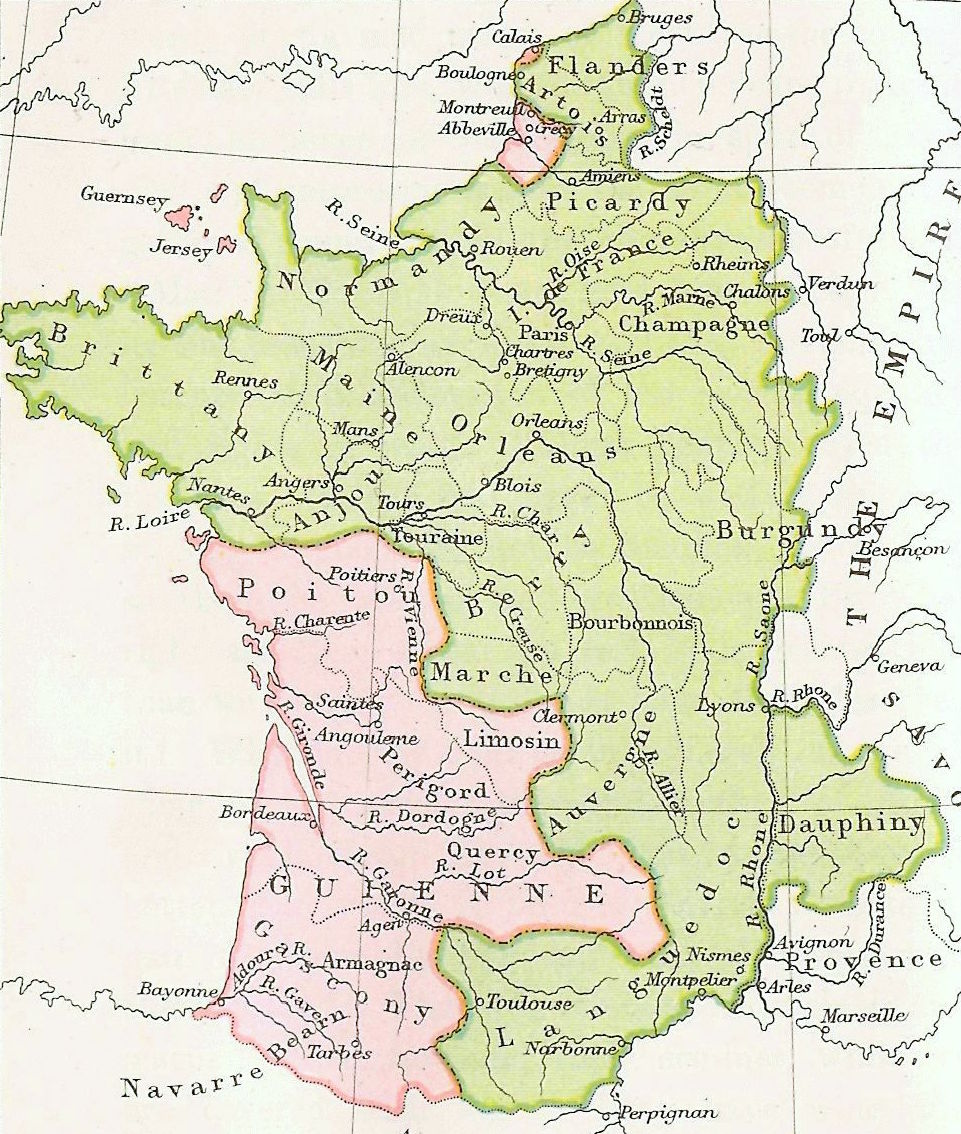
English territory in France in 1369 is shown in pink.

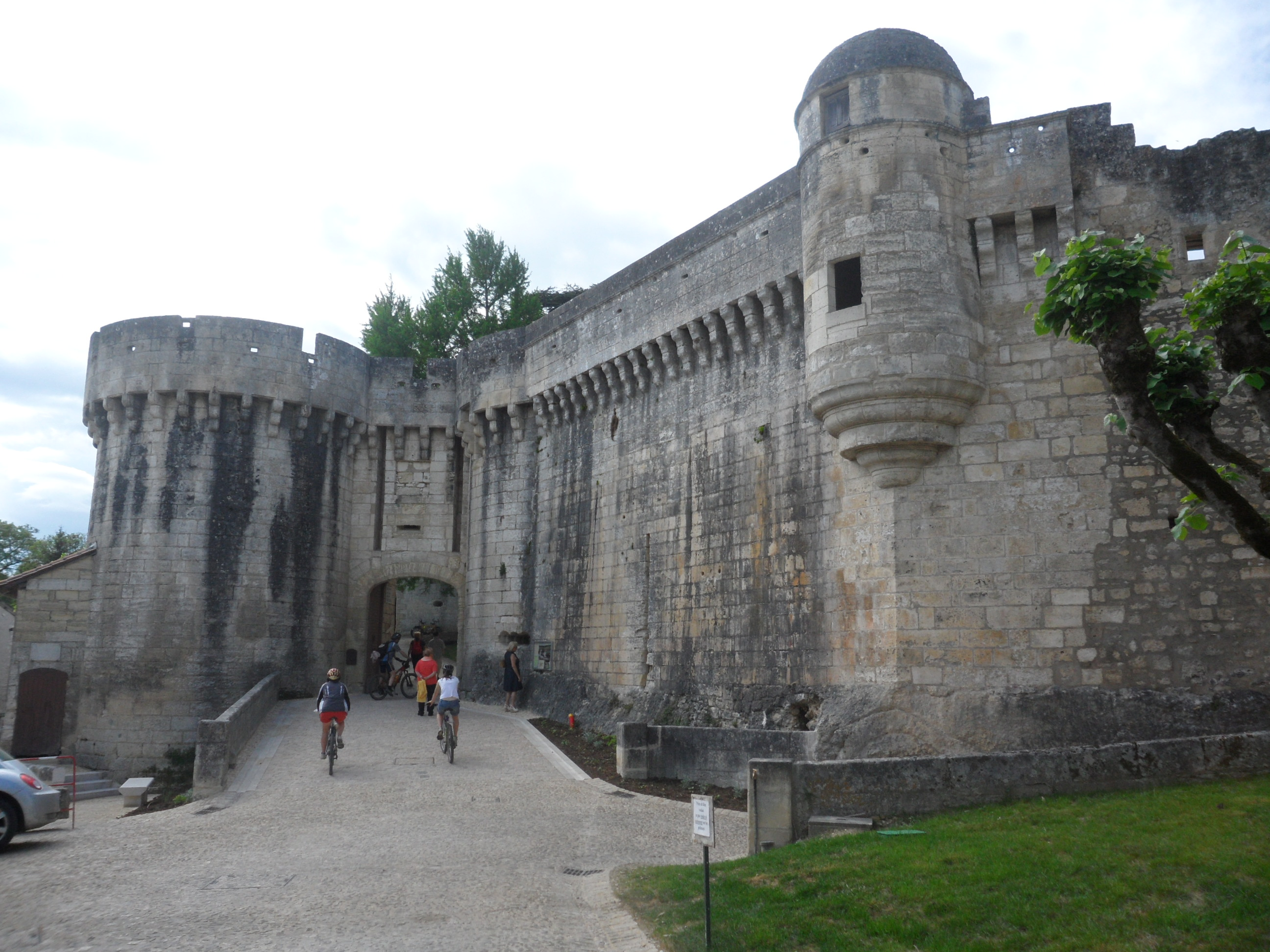
Bourdeilles Castle; captured by Pembroke soon after his arrival in France

Much of Pembroke's adult life was devoted to royal service, beginning in October 1364 when he was in attendance on King Edward III at Dover. In 1369 he entailed and enfeoffed part of his earldom, with the reversion going to the King; this was granted to his feoffees who then regranted them to him for five years. This effectively created a trust for his heirs, in the event of his death abroad, and if they should also die heirless, the estate would return intact to the King. Pembroke's first active service came in the same year; he accompanied the King's son, Edmund, Earl of Cambridge, on a much-delayed campaign in Aquitaine in south-west France with a force of 400 men-at-arms. This was a reinforcement for the campaign of the King's eldest son, Edward, the Black Prince, which had suffered setbacks following the Prince's intervention in the war of Castilian succession and the French reopening the Hundred Years' War in 1369. Pembroke and Cambridge landed at St Malo, apparently escaping the notice of a local French commander, and marched 260 miles (420 km) south to Angoulême, joining the Black Prince there in late April.

They arrived at a period of further military setbacks for the English. Archambaud, Count of Périgord, was leading a French force attempting to join the Duke of Anjou; the Earls of Pembroke and Cambridge were tasked with devastating as much of Archambaud's land as possible. This they excelled at, conducting a chevauchée – a large-scale mounted raid – into Périgord, burning property and killing the inhabitants. Pembroke's force then captured Bourdeilles castle after an eleven-week siege when a mistimed sortie allowed the English entry. Knighted soon after by the Earl of Cambridge, Pembroke continued to campaign in both Anjou and Poitou. This involved much raiding, some of it alongside the Black Prince. By June Pembroke was raising a large army to relieve French pressure on the north of Poitou. He and Cambridge were joined by Sir John Chandos around this time. They arrived in the Vendée at the end of June 1369, and captured Roche-sur-Yon as a result of the French captain betraying the town. This was a strategically important French-held enclave inside English France, and it belonged to the Duke of Anjou. Following the taking of Roche-sur-Yon Pembroke led a successful campaign into the Loire Valley. Although he failed in an attempt to capture Saumur, he took and held both of the main bridges across the river Loire between Saumur and Nantes. They were already strongly fortified and Pembroke strengthened these defences and garrisoned them. This campaign greatly diminished the ability of the French to attack through the western march of Poitou.

Disagreements and tensions arose among the English generals, particularly between Pembroke and Chandos, based on their vastly different social status. As the modern historian Jonathan Sumption puts it, Pembroke "may have had the grander name but his inexperience showed". Although Chandos was appointed seneschal of Anjou he was only a banneret and so Pembroke, with aristocratic arrogance, refused to serve under him. It is possible Pembroke was acting on the advice of his council, but the result was that the two English armies were kept separate from each other.

In October (or possibly December) Pembroke invaded Anjou with just his own force of 300 men-at-arms on a fire-raising raid to Puirenon. During this Pembroke was ambushed by about 600 men under either Louis de Sancerre or Jean de Bueil. Taken by surprise, Pembroke's men were still trying to form up when they were charged by French cavalry. About 100 of the English were killed or taken prisoner, and the French captured supplies, horses and materiel. Unable to fight off the attacking force, Pembroke escaped to a house at the edge of a village and sent to Chandos for assistance. In revenge, says Cokayne, Pembroke then raided Anjou again, before being despatched with Cambridge to relieve Belleperche, in early 1370, where they raised the French siege. At the same time, Pembroke's agents had recruited 300 men in England to join his force, and they were soon due to sail.

The Earl of Pembroke and some knights had no other remedy but to retire, as quickly as they could, into an unembattled house, which belonged to the Knights Templars, without a moat, and only enclosed with a stone wall. All who could get there in time shut themselves in: the greater part of the others were slain or made prisoners, and their arms and their horses taken. The Earl of Pembroke lost all his plate.

— Jean Froissart, in his Chronicle, on the rout of the Earl of Pembroke in 1369

Pembroke was embarrassed at being rescued by Chandos and this "did nothing to abate the ill-feeling between the two leaders" and "was a serious blow to Edward III's attempts to stabilize Aquitaine", according to the historian R. I. Jack. Not only had the escapade damaged the English cause in the region, but it led directly to Chandos's failure later in the year to recapture the abbey at Saint-Savin, Vienne, where Chandos was killed. This was a major loss for the English, as none of the remaining English captains in France, including Pembroke, had the personal skill or martial experience of Chandos. A contemporary chronicler reported that the French King, Charles V, when he heard of Chandos's death, said that no-one was now "left able to make peace between England and France".

In early 1370 Pembroke was nominated for the senior and exclusive chivalric Order of the Garter, and his robes were ordered for him, according to government accounts, on 12 March. This timing allowed him to attend the order's annual feast in April. He took the stall of the deceased Thomas, Earl of Warwick; the renewal of war, however, meant that he was rarely able to attend Garter feasts again. Later the same year he accompanied the Black Prince in a major campaign against Limoges. The Black Prince was suffering from the illness that was to kill him and was so ill he could not stand, being conveyed on a litter. Before commencing the attack, Pembroke and the Prince marched to Cognac, where the Prince's younger brother, John of Gaunt, Duke of Lancaster, was due to arrive in September 1370. While the King was willing to devote much of his personal wealth to this campaign, he was less keen to allow large numbers of English knights to join them. Gaunt was accompanied by Walter, Baron Mauny, one of his closest advisers and Pembroke's father-in-law, who had become frustrated at dictating strategy from a distance. Limoges was captured in October 1370 after a five-day siege in which the English successfully mined the city's walls. It was subsequently sacked and many inhabitants were massacred. Pembroke appears to have taken a full part in these events. The Prince returned to England in January 1371 while Pembroke remained in France and continued to prosecute the war, now alongside Gaunt. Together they besieged Montpaon from January to February.

== Return to England ==
Pembroke was recalled to London in February 1371 to attend parliament, and by now he dominated the court. Parliament sat from February to March 1371 and Pembroke was appointed a trier of petitions. It is possible his role was not purely administrative, as some contemporary chronicles portray him as the main leader of a parliamentary faction which politically attacked the King's clerical ministers. His actions have been described as radical. As a result of this assault, William of Wykeham and Thomas Brantingham, the Chancellor and Treasurer, respectively, were forced to resign, and their positions were taken by laymen. Sumption suggests the immediate cause for Pembroke's attack was his recent experiences in "frustrating and underfunded campaigns" while, at home, as the writer of a contemporary French tract colourfully put it, "the clergy reposed peacefully beneath shady canopies elegantly scoffing fat delicacies". On the other hand, Ormrod notes that the men who filled the vacant offices seem to have had no connections to Pembroke, (Note: More likely, says Ormrod, they were "conspicuously loyal" to the crown at a time when the commons wanted to restore international faith in England's fiscal health.) suggesting he was unlikely to have been leading a faction.

=== Feud with Lord Grey of Ruthin ===
While Pembroke was on campaign, Lord Grey of Ruthin received word that the Earl had died in France. Believing this, and as Pembroke's heir, he entered Pembroke's Northamptonshire estate near the village of Yardley Hastings to hunt. When Pembroke returned to England in early 1371 and heard of this, he was enraged. He petitioned the King at Marlborough Castle that September for satisfaction, but was unable to persuade Edward to assist him. Indeed, it may be that he was refused entry to the King's chambers by the royal chamberlain, Lord Latimer. While Latimer undoubtedly had the authority to restrict access to the King, notes Ormrod, "to refuse so distinguished a supplicant as John Hastings was, however, an outrageous abuse of power and a major affront to the nobility's trust in the politics of access".

Pembroke complained to anyone who would listen. Latimer later said his master had, in fact, discussed the event with Pembroke, although Latimer also felt Ruthin had acted appropriately under the circumstances and was able to offer Pembroke little comfort. (Note: The detailed evidence for these events comes from legal depositions made in 1407, when Ruthin's case was first litigated. The surviving manuscripts are now held in the College of Arms (collated as MS Processus in Curia Marescalli, 2 vols).) Ruthin attempted to make peace with Pembroke, even coming to him at Yardley Hastings in the company of the Earls of Hereford, March and Salisbury. Pembroke threatened Ruthin with disinheritance, which the three earls objected to. Pembroke did not, at that time, carry out his threat.

Pembroke was still in England in early 1372, when his wife, now aged sixteen, became pregnant. Before he left – unaware of this development – he arranged contingency plans in case he failed to return from campaign. To avoid Ruthin inheriting anything in the event of Pembroke's death, Pembroke sought and received the King's permission to make a further enfeoffment following the one of 1369. This specified that – after his debts had been paid – most of his land would pass to a cousin, William Beauchamp. Beauchamp was not only his friend but in Pembroke's eyes a worthy successor to his title. This may have been an extreme reaction to a personal dislike of Ruthin. In the event Pembroke's plans were unnecessary since his wife gave birth to a male heir after he left the country. (Note: The dispute had implications that echoed for the next sixty years or more, as up until 1436, the Lord Greys of Ruthin did indeed repeatedly claim to be heir-general of childless Earls of Pembroke. Although the Hastings line died out in 1389, the Greys' claim was then itself disputed by other families with dynastic links to the earls.)

Beauchamp was a younger son of Thomas, Earl of Warwick – who had died of plague in 1369 – and so was a cousin to Pembroke. (Note: Pembroke and William Beauchamp were matrilineal cousins: Their mothers were both daughters of Roger Mortimer, 1st Earl of March.) Thus began the process which eventually resulted in Ruthin's disinheritance. To protect his estates in the event of his death abroad, he had had them enfeoffed in 1369 and returned to him. Now, in April 1372, Pembroke quitclaimed them back to the feoffees, again entrusting his lands. The trustees were instructed that, if Pembroke died abroad, the Hastings estates were to go to the King and everything else to Beauchamp. If for some reason Beauchamp was not able to inherit, the estates would go to the distantly-related Sir William Clinton.

When Pembroke returned to France on campaign again in 1372 he travelled with Beauchamp. On at least one occasion they shared a bed: it was common at the time for apprentices, students and soldiers to sleep together and travellers would often share a bed at an inn. Nevertheless, sharing a bed with an earl was a distinction. Legal dockets indicate the pair continued to discuss Ruthin's disinheritance. Pembroke told Beauchamp he considered Ruthin would celebrate if Pembroke died, but "would not have as much of his inheritance as he thinks he will have".

== Return to France ==
Pembroke soon returned to France and the war. It is possible the King personally requested him to lead the campaign. The Gascons of south-west France – firm allies of the English – held a favourable opinion of his previous efforts. The government viewed Pembroke as a commander in the style of those who had swept the French before them in the earlier years of the war. On 5 March 1372 he indentured with the King to serve in Aquitaine and was appointed lieutenant of Aquitaine on 20 April. Mark Ormrod has described the campaign as a minor one, as Pembroke was accompanied only by his personal retinue of 160 men. The fleet carried £12,000 in silver coin, to enable Pembroke to raise more men in France; Pembroke was instructed to recruit 500 knights, 1,500 esquires and 1,000 archers.

The plan appears to have been for Pembroke to land at La Rochelle, giving succour to Poitou and the Saintonge, and then, having strengthened Aquitaine, to march northwards, cross the Loire, and join up with the King, who would also be on campaign. Unknown to the English, Charles V became aware of Pembroke's pending invasion of Aquitaine shortly after Edward III's Great Council had decided upon it.

=== Defeat at La Rochelle ===
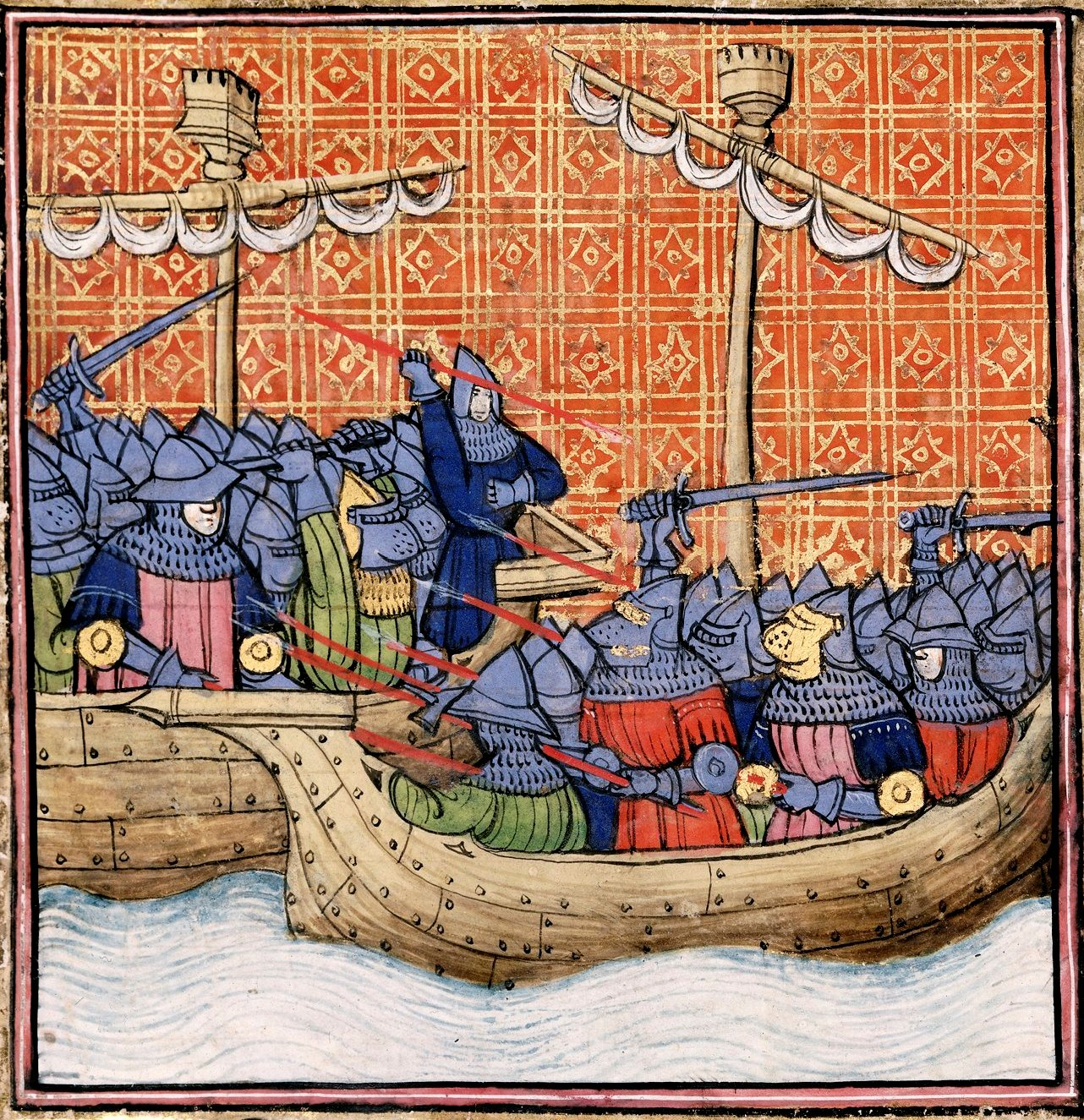
The Battle of La Rochelle as depicted in a miniature sometime after 1380; the English ships are lower than the Castilian.

Pembroke was much delayed; although he was in Plymouth by May, his fleet could not be available until June, because of a shortage of ships. He sailed with a small fleet: fourteen to seventeen ships, only three of them outfitted as warships. At the time the English did not possess purpose-built warships. If ships were required for military purposes, merchant ships known as cogs (Note: Cogs were the standard English merchant ship of the day. Cogs had a deep draught, a round hull and were propelled by a single large sail set on a mast amidships and were able to carry many fighting men.) were converted by the addition of wooden "castles" at the bow and stern and the erection of crow's nest platforms at the masthead. Some of Pembroke's ships were hired from merchants on condition they were not to be so converted and others were individually so small they could not be. James Sherborne comments that this force was "gravely inadequate". The government was aware that both the French and Castilian fleets were at sea and liable to be in the area Pembroke was sailing to, but Pembroke may have expected to only encounter pirates.

Pembroke's ships reached La Rochelle on the afternoon of 22 June, to find the town still held by the English. Attempting to enter the harbour, Pembroke encountered a much larger force of twelve large Castilian galleys (Note: Galleys had long been used by the Mediterranean powers and the French adopted them for use in the English Channel. Being shallow-draught vessels propelled by banks of oars the galleys could penetrate shallow harbours and were highly manoeuvrable, making them effective for raiding and ship-to-ship combat in meeting engagements. Operating the galleys was a specialist activity and called for highly trained crews, making them very expensive to maintain.) and eight carracks. (Note: Carracks were larger versions of cogs, made more manoeuvrable by the addition of a lateen mizzen sail and were common in the Mediterranean.) They had been lying in wait for the English force since Pembroke's plans had become known weeks earlier. A French fleet under Owen of Wales was intended to join them, but arrived too late to take part. Pembroke knighted some of his squires on his flagship. A contemporary said the Earl and his army were "marvellously pleased ... for they did not think much of the Spanish and thought to beat them easily."

The knights of England and Poitou that day shewed excellent proofs of chivalry and prowess. The earl fought gallantly, seeking his enemies everywhere, and did extraordinary feats of arms ... all the other knights behaved equally well.

— Froissart, Chronicle

Pembroke's smaller ships were towered over by the tall carracks, and Castilian archers rained arrows onto the decks of English ships, while protected by their own wooden breastworks. Pembroke found his fleet caught between the enemy and the sandbanks located off what later became La Pallice. The Castilian ships were equipped with arbalests, which caused great destruction to the wooden decks of the English ships. Pembroke was unable to replicate the English victories of such earlier naval battles as Winchelsea and Nájera because of his lack of archers, which would otherwise have allowed him to lay down suppressing fire on the enemy crews. Similarly, the Castilian missile superiority meant English soldiers were unable to board the Castilian ships.

The battle lasted two days. The fighting broke off as night fell on the 22nd; Pembroke had lost two ships and was surrounded by the Castilian fleet overnight. Fighting recommenced in the morning. Pembroke found his flagship attacked by four of the enemy galleys, who used grappling hooks to attach themselves to the English ship, and later managed to douse the decks of some ships with oil which could then be ignited by fire arrows. Fire, says Sherborne, played a vital role in the Castilian triumph. Around this point – with horses running wild and kicking holes in the hulls and his men throwing themselves overboard to avoid the flames – Pembroke surrendered. Much of his fleet was burned or captured, many of his retinue were killed, and those who survived were taken prisoner. The Earl of Huntingdon was among those captured. The £12,000 in silver was discovered and taken by the French. Pembroke's actions at La Rochelle have been the subject of criticism by several historians: J. H. Ramsay describes Pembroke's defeat as the worst ever inflicted on the English navy, E. F. Jacob suggests that it was a disastrous blow, and Anthony Steel argues it lost England control of the English Channel for several years.

== Capture, imprisonment and ransom ==
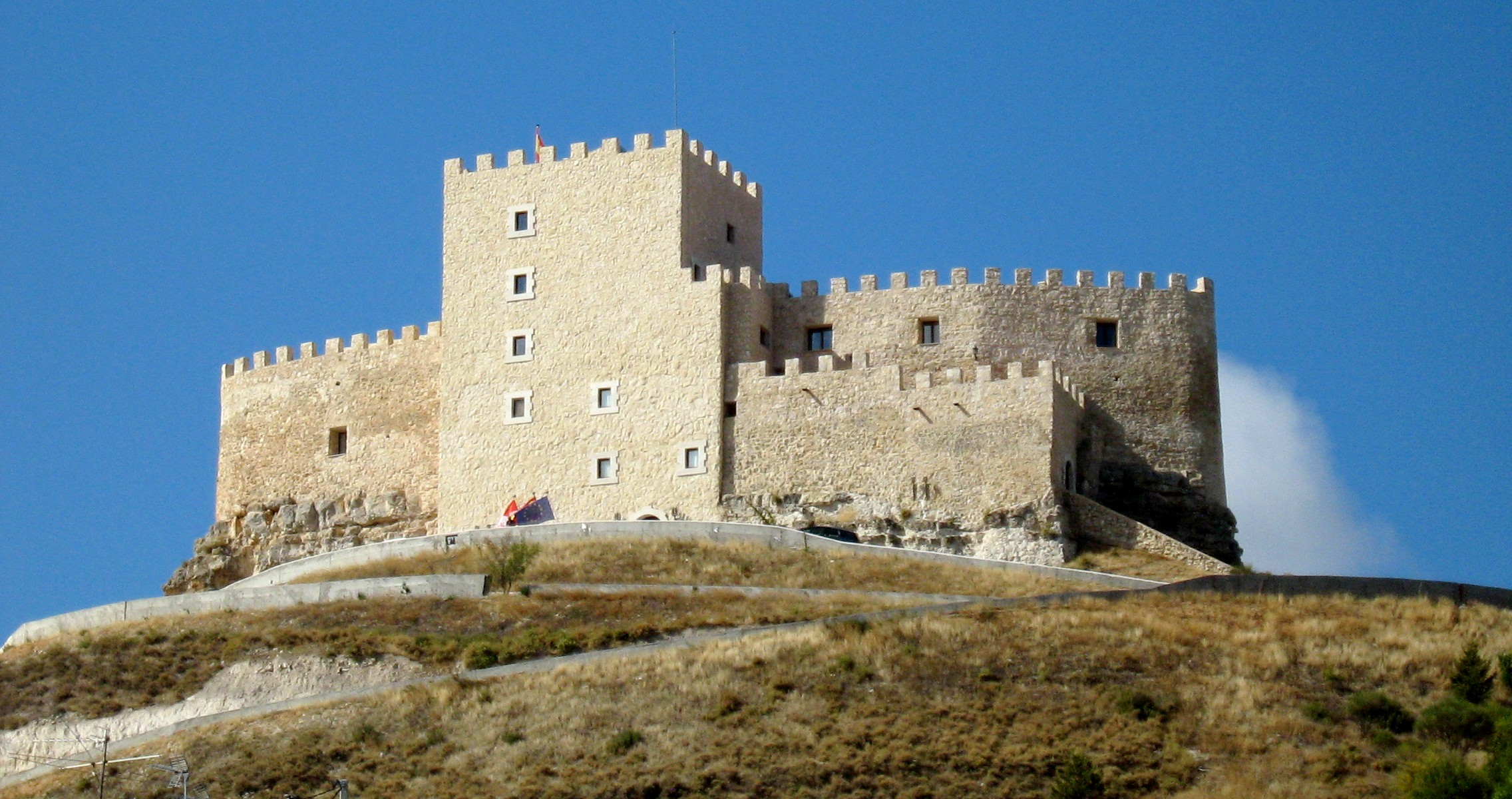
Curiel Castle, 2009, where Pembroke was held during the early years of his imprisonment.

Following his capture, Pembroke was taken to Castile, along with about 160 other survivors of the battle, 70 of them knights, and was paraded through Burgos. There he was confined to prison, where he was treated poorly. The Spanish transported prisoners "bound with chains or cords, like dogs in leash", or, as reported at Santander, in leg irons. The treatment meted out to Pembroke and his men appalled the Castilians' French allies: the French chronicler Jean Froissart wrote, of the Castilians, "they know no finer courtesy, just like the Germans". While in prison, Pembroke received news of his wife's pregnancy. A fellow prisoner, Sir John Trailly, following his return to England, reported Pembroke's reaction to a parson connected to the Grey affinity. He was not, Trailly told him, as happy at the news as one might expect; rather, he was moved to anger, as now he had a son and if that son died without heirs, Pembroke's careful planning against Ruthin might be undone.

A few months later, possibly after negotiation with the King of France, King Henry II of Castile agreed to sell his right to Pembroke's ransom to the Constable of France, Bertrand du Guesclin, for 120,000 francs. To finance this du Guesclin had to sell his Spanish lordships of Soria and Molina, which he had previously captured from Spain, back to the Castilian King. Pembroke's agreement with du Guesclin laid down that he would pay him 50,000 francs immediately, and the remainder within six weeks of Pembroke's arrival back in England. Pembroke's imprisonment was to continue for another three years, however, as – despite Pembroke's close connections at court and with the King – there was little progress made in arranging for Pembroke's ransom until early 1375. King Charles appears to have repeatedly held up the process of Pembroke's release, whose own circumstances were especially harsh. He was lodged at Curiel Castle in what Ormrod calls "infamously gruesome conditions", enough to eventually break his health. The first instalment was eventually lodged in a short-term moneylending account for du Guesclin, with a Fleming in Bruges, by which time Pembroke was ill. He was taken by du Guesclin to Paris – "in short stages as kindly and gently as could be" – but the Earl's increasing illness forced du Guesclin to make for Calais with all speed, as he had promised to facilitate the Earl's return to England by Easter.

== Death and succession ==
Pembroke died in Picardy (at either Arras or Moreuil) on 16 April 1375, following his release from prison. Despite a contemporary rumour that he had been poisoned by the Castilians, more likely causes were the dire conditions (at least during the early years) of his imprisonment and sickness and fatigue brought on by his hard years of confinement. Cockayne notes that, because Pembroke died in France, and the balance of his ransom was to be paid to du Guesclin after the Earl had returned to England, du Guesclin never received the balance of the ransom. (Note: Although the French King did grant him 50,000 francs in compensation.) Ormrod suggests that news of his death was greeted with "genuine shock" by the English nobility, both on account of Pembroke's youth and aristocratic status. The King did not attend the Garter feast of 1375, perhaps due to being in formal mourning for the Earl.

Pembroke was buried in the choir of the Friars Preachers, in Hereford, sometime after 28 April 1375. The King sent offerings for the Earl's funeral. Pembroke had written two wills. The first was on 5 May 1372, which was superseded by another on 26 March 1374. The first one declared that the Earl wanted all his debts paid "by the hands of my executors and by the hands of the feoffees of my manors". The second will, proved in November 1376, made no mention of any feoffees, but did provide instructions for his funeral, particularly for his tomb. To this purpose he bequeathed £140, specifically requesting one to be built as grand as that of Elizabeth de Burgh, Lady of Clare. This will also specified rewards for his servants, especially those who had been with him in Castile and France.

Pembroke was succeeded by his son, John, who had been born to Anne a few months after the Earl's capture and whom Pembroke never saw. (Note: This was to be another in a number of occasions when no adult was available to inherit the earldom and the Hastings family endured a minority.) His mother died in 1377. Pembroke's wife had inherited her father's barony on his death in 1371, and outlived her husband, dying in 1384. She continued to style herself Countess of Pembroke, as well as Lady of Bergavenny and of Mauny, and received her dower in November 1375. The rest of the Hastings estates were held in ward by the King during the minority of Pembroke's son. The young Hastings was known as John of Reading. He was killed in a joust in 1389, the earldom of Pembroke and the barony of Mauny becoming extinct as a result. Further, despite Pembroke's careful preparations and entailments, it came to pass as he had feared. When John the younger died childless, "the son of that Reynold Grey whom the second Earl had disliked so heartily claimed the heirship-general", and the inheritance was broken up.

== Reputation ==
Contemporary rumour put his defeat at La Rochelle down to Pembroke being, as Cokayne put it, "a man of evil life, who had committed adultery, or to his having resolved to annul the liberties of the church". A contemporary chronicler described him as a "homme de graunt renoune". Modern historiography has been rather more nuanced. Pembroke's recent biographer has noted a certain immaturity of character – particularly in his relationship with John Chandos – whilst also noting that the biggest defeat of his career does not necessarily indicate lack of leadership or judgement on his part. The truth, Jack says, is that "Pembroke was luckless and arrogant, but not necessarily incompetent", while Ormrod argues that he was not so close to the King as to be completely uncritical of policy. Sumption is more forgiving in his judgement, describing Pembroke as an able man with, by the end of his life at least, "political stature". Sumption also sees Pembroke as "intelligent, self-confident and ambitious", if also "hot-headed". Michael Prestwich notes that Pembroke "lacked the outstanding ability" that Edward III's captains had possessed in the 1340s and 1350s. Ormrod describes him as a "bellicose" character, whose death, along with that of Edward, Lord Despenser, the same year and Humphrey, Earl of Hereford, two years previously removed three of England's most promising commanders.

== External sources ==
- The Chronicles of Froissart

Peerage of England
Preceded by Lawrence Hastings	Earl of Pembroke; 1348–1375	Succeeded by John Hastings
