= Coventry Friary =

Coventry Friary may refer to:

- Greyfriars, Coventry (Franciscan Friars Minor, Conventual)
- Whitefriars, Coventry (Carmelite)
