= William de Clinton, Earl of Huntingdon =

Arms of de Clinton: Argent, six crosses crosslet fitchée sable three two and one on a chief azure two mullets or pierced gules

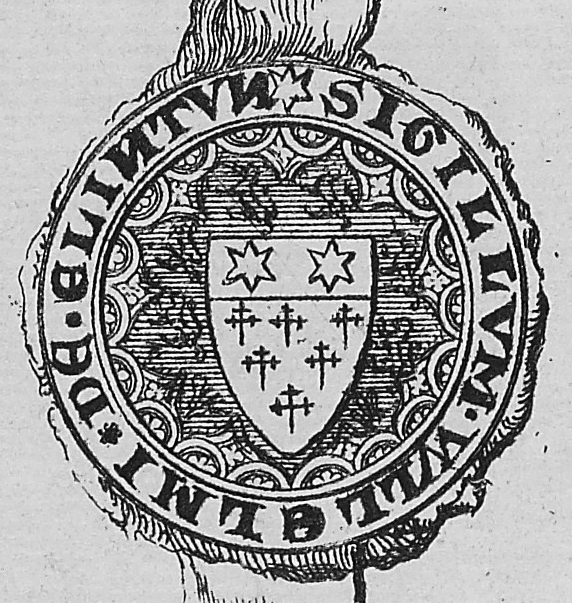
SIGILLUM W(I)LLELMI DE CLINTUN ("seal of William de Clinton"). Drawing of seal appended to charter recording award dated 19 July 1347 of a court of honour, of which Clinton was a juror, convened before the Siege of Calais in the matter of Warbelton v. Gorges. MS Ashmole 1137, f.144, Bodleian Library, Oxford

William de Clinton, Earl of Huntingdon (c. 1304 – 31 October 1354) and Lord High Admiral, was the younger son of John de Clinton, 1st Baron Clinton (d. 1312/13) of Maxstoke Castle, Warwickshire, and Ida de Odingsells, the granddaughter of Ida II Longespee.

The surname Clinton came from the lordship of Clinton in Oxfordshire, given to them at the Conquest. Geoffrey de Clinton was Lord Chamberlain and Treasurer of Henry I, while Roger de Clinton was Bishop of Coventry 1127–1148.

William de Clinton was a boyhood companion of Edward III, and one of the king's followers who secretly entered Nottingham Castle and captured Roger Mortimer, 1st Earl of March. The arrest and subsequent execution of Mortimer cleared the way for the adolescent Edward III to assume power. William de Clinton married Juliana de Leybourne, widow of John Hastings, 2nd Baron Hastings.

From 6 September 1330 to 14 January 1337 he served in Parliament. In 1333, he was constituted Lord Admiral of the Seas. On 16 March 1337, Edward III created William de Clinton Earl of Huntingdon. William de Clinton died in 1354, leaving an only daughter, Elizabeth, whose legitimacy is doubtful.

== Notes ==
Political offices
Preceded by Bartholomew Burghersh	Lord Warden of the Cinque Ports; 1330–1348	Succeeded by Bartholomew Burghersh
Legal offices
Preceded by Bartholomew Burghersh	Justice in Eyre south of the Trent; 1343–1345	Succeeded by The Lord Berkeley
Peerage of England
New creation	Earl of Huntingdon; 1337–1354	Extinct
New creation	Baron Clinton; 1330–1354	Extinct
