= Juliana Leybourne =

English noblewoman (1303-1367)

Juliana Leybourne, Countess of Huntingdon
- Born: 1303
- Died: 2 November 1367 (aged 63–64)
- Other name: Infanta of Kent
- Occupation: Noblewoman
- Spouse(s): John Hastings, 2nd Baron Hastings; Sir Thomas Blount; William de Clinton, 1st Earl of Huntingdon
- Children: Laurence Hastings, 1st Earl of Pembroke

Juliana Leybourne (1303 – 2 November 1367) was an English noblewoman who was heir to a huge estate. She married three times and became a countess of Huntingdon. She was a patron of textiles. She gave huge land rights to Edward III but retained some rights for her lifetime. She was buried in a chapel she had built on the side of St Augustine's Abbey in Canterbury where prayers were to be said every day for her after her death.

== Life ==
She was born in 1303 or 1304 and she was the daughter of Alice (born Tosny) and Thomas of Leybourne. Her father died in 1307. Her grandfather was the first Lord Leybourne and he had three sons. By 1310 they were either dead or outlawed and Juliana became her grandfather's heir. When her grandfather, Admiral Sir William de Leybourne died she became a ward of Aymer de Valence, 2nd Earl of Pembroke. She was so rich that she was referred to as the "Infanta of Kent".

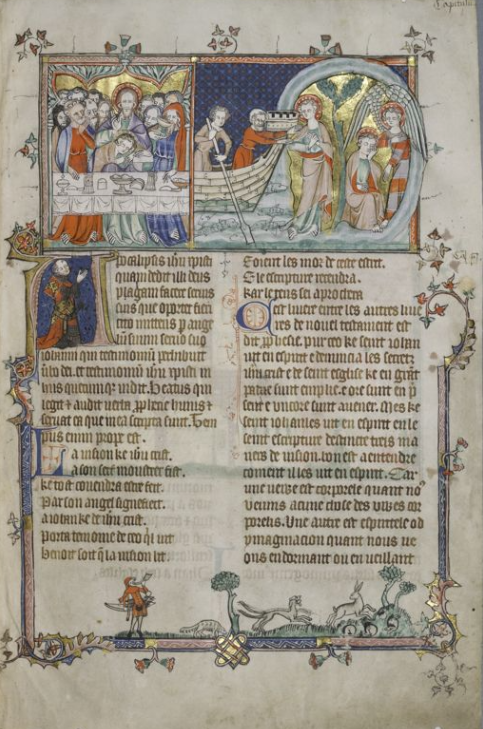
Illustration from Henry de Cobham's Apocalypse which was left to her in 1339

She married John Hastings, 2nd Baron Hastings, and they had a son Laurence Hastings, 1st Earl of Pembroke. After her husband died she married Sir Thomas Blount who was the steward of the king's household and he became Baron Blount. Blount died on 13 August 1328 and she married William de Clinton, 1st Earl of Huntingdon who built Maxstoke Castle. He died in 1354.

In 1362 she decided to give all of her lands and rights to Edward III. She retained a life interest and a number of manors were reserved for her to give to churches etc. She was living most of her time in Maxstoke but she preferred her estate at Preston-next-Wingham in Kent.

In the 1360s she funded the building of the "Countess's Chapel" or more usually "St Anne's Chapel" that was built on the side of the St Augustine's Abbey in Canterbury. This was a small square chapel that had its own buttresses. Within the chapel was the Abbot of Bourne who had died in 1334 and the Abbot of Colwel who died in 1375.

She gave the manor of Dene in Thanet to the abbey and she created a chantry to say daily prayers for her after her death. On about 1 November she died and she was buried at the abbey in her St Anne's Chapel. She had ignored her grandson heir, John Hastings, 2nd Earl of Pembroke, and she had arranged for her possessions to be transferred to Edward III. Her possessions at death are known because there is an inventory that is extant. She left a highly illustrated book called an Apocalypse to St Augustine's Abbey. She had been left the book by Henry de Cobham, 1st Baron Cobham, when he died in 1339. Notable items in the inventory were the textiles and today there are still examples of embroidery which include the Huntingdon crest. A larger item was a hanging featuring the English hero Bevis of Hampton. It is possible that she did some of the textile work.
