= John Hastings, 1st Baron Hastings =

English noble (1262–1313)

John Hastings, 1st Baron Hastings (6 May 1262 – February 1313), was an English landowner, soldier and administrator who was one of the Competitors for the Crown of Scotland in 1290 and signed and sealed the Barons' Letter of 1301.

== Origins ==
He was born in 1262 at Allesley, near Coventry in Warwickshire, the eldest son of Henry de Hastings (c. 1235 – c. 1268) who was summoned to Parliament by Simon de Montfort, 6th Earl of Leicester as Lord Hastings in 1263. Although following the defeat of de Montfort this peerage creation was not recognized by King Henry III, John Hastings is sometimes referred to as the second Baron Hastings. His mother (whose father William III de Cantilupe (d. 1254) had purchased the wardship and marriage of Henry de Hastings) was the heiress Joanna de Cantilupe (d. 1271), one of the two sisters and co-heiresses of Sir George de Cantilupe (1251-1273), 4th feudal baron of Eaton Bray in Bedfordshire and feudal Lord of Abergavenny.

== Career ==
In 1273, he became the 13th Lord of Abergavenny on the death of his childless uncle, Sir George de Cantilupe, and thereby acquired Abergavenny Castle and the vast lands of the honour of Abergavenny. He also inherited many Cantilupe estates including Aston Cantlow in Warwickshire, one of that family's seats.

He fought from the 1290s in the Scottish, Irish and French wars of King Edward I and held the offices of Seneschal of Gascony and Lieutenant of Aquitaine simultaneously. In 1290 he had unsuccessfully contested the crown of the Kingdom of Scotland as a grandson of Ada, third daughter of David of Scotland, Earl of Huntingdon, who was a grandson of King David I of Scotland. Also in 1290 he was summoned to the English Parliament as Lord Hastings, which created him a peer. In February 1300/1 he had licence to crenellate his manor and town of Fillongley in Warwickshire. He signed and sealed the Barons' Letter of 1301 to Pope Boniface VIII, denying the pope's right to adjudicate the conflict between England and Scotland.

== Marriage and children ==
He married twice:

- Firstly to Isabel de Valence, a daughter of William de Valence, 1st Earl of Pembroke by whom he had children:
  - William Hastings (1282–1311), eldest son and heir apparent, who predeceased his father, he married Eleanor Martin, the daughter of William Martin, 1st Baron Martin, but they had no surviving children.
  - John Hastings, 2nd Baron Hastings (1286-1325), eldest surviving son and heir, who married Juliane de Leybourne (d.1367), by whom he was the father of Lawrence Hastings, 1st Earl of Pembroke.
  - Joan Hastings (d.1307), who married William de Huntingfield (c.1280-1313) of Huntingfield, Suffolk. Like her parents and paternal grandparents she was buried in the Hastings Chapel of the Greyfriars, Coventry. Her grandson was William de Huntingfield, 1st Baron Huntingfield (1329–1376);
  - Elizabeth Hastings, who married Roger Grey, 1st Baron Grey de Ruthyn.
- Secondly he married Isabel le Despenser, a daughter of Hugh le Despenser, 1st Earl of Winchester and Isabella de Beauchamp, by whom he had further children:
  - Thomas de Hastings
  - Margaret de Hastings
  - Sir Hugh Hastings (died 1347), of Sutton, who married Margery Foliot (grand-daughter of Jordan Foliot and of William de Braose, 2nd Baron Braose), and left children.

== Death and burial ==
He died in February 1313, aged 50, and was succeeded in the barony by his eldest son John Hastings, 2nd Baron Hastings. He and his first wife Isabel de Valence were buried (together with his parents) in the Hastings Chapel of the Greyfriars Monastery in Coventry, Warwickshire (founded circa 1234), commemorated by effigies. According to Dugdale (1666) quoting from an inscription in ancient French, the stained glass windows of this chapel displayed coats of arms including: Hastings, Cumyn (wife of brother Edmund Hastings), Cantilupe, Valence, de Spenser and Huntingfield (husband of daughter Joan Hastings).

Paternal arms of John de Hastings: Or, a maunch gules

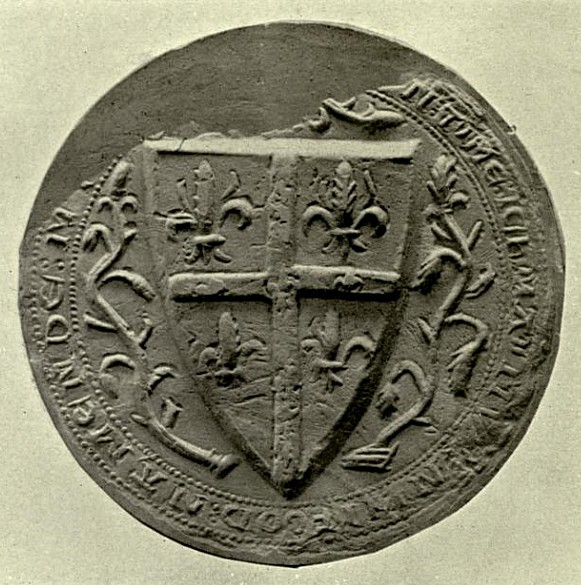
Seal of John Hastings appended to the Barons' Letter, 1301. The arms are unidentified, but are blazoned: On a cross between four fleurs-de-lys five fleurs-de-lys; like his brother he did not seal the Letter with his paternal arms

Peerage of England
New creation	Baron Hastings; 1290–1313	Succeeded by John Hastings
