= Agnes Mortimer, Countess of Pembroke =

English noblewoman

Agnes Mortimer
- Countess of Pembroke
- Born: 1317
- Died: 25 July 1368 (aged 50–51)
- Spouses: Laurence Hastings, 1st Earl of Pembroke; John de Hakelut
- Issue: John Hastings, 2nd Earl of Pembroke
- Father: Roger Mortimer, 1st Earl of March
- Mother: Joan de Geneville, 2nd Baroness Geneville

Agnes Mortimer, Countess of Pembroke (1317 – 25 July 1368) was the wife of Laurence Hastings, 1st Earl of Pembroke. She was a daughter of Roger Mortimer, 1st Earl of March and Joan de Geneville, Baroness Geneville.

== Family ==
Agnes Mortimer was one of the twelve children of Roger Mortimer, 1st Earl of March and Joan de Geneville, Baroness Geneville. Her paternal grandparents were Edmund Mortimer, 2nd Baron Mortimer and Margaret de Fiennes. Her maternal grandparents were Piers de Geneville, of Trim Castle and Ludlow, and Jeanne of Lusignan.

== First marriage ==
Agnes' father had just been created Earl of March, and was thus able to look for more powerful spouses for his children. In a brilliant set of marriages, Agnes was therefore married to Laurence Hastings, 1st Earl of Pembroke, a ward of her father's, while her sister Beatrice was married to Edward of Norfolk. Edward III and Queen Isabella attended the wedding at Hereford; dates of this event vary by historian, and it has been speculated that it took place in late May or early June 1328, or in 1329. Agnes and Laurence had one surviving son, John Hastings, 2nd Earl of Pembroke, who was born in August 1347. Laurence died a year later.

== Second marriage ==
After Laurence's death, Agnes married John de Hakelut. There were no known children from this marriage. Agnes died on 25 July 1368 and was buried at the Minoresses without Algate in London. She left a will that was dated 10 October 1367.

== Ancestry ==
Ancestors of Agnes Mortimer, Countess of Pembroke

Ralph de Mortimer
Roger Mortimer, 1st Baron Mortimer
Gladys the Dark
Edmund Mortimer, 2nd Baron Wigmore
William de Braose
Maud de Braose
Eva Marshal
Roger Mortimer, 1st Earl of March
Infelram de Fiennes
William de Fiennes
Isabelle Conde
Margaret de Fiennes
Jean de Brienne, Grand Butler of France
Blanche de Brienne
Jeanne, Dame de Chateaudun
Agnes Mortimer
Simon de Joinville
Geoffrey de Geneville, 1st Baron Geneville
Beatrix d'Auxonne
Peter de Geneville
Gilbert de Lacy, of Ewyas Lacy
Maud de Lacy
Isabel Bigod
Joan de Geneville, 2nd Baroness Geneville
Hugh XI of Lusignan, Count of La Marche
Hugh XIII, Count of La Marche
Yolande de Dreux, Countess of Penthièvre and of Porhoet
Joan of Lusignan
Raoul III, Sire de Fougères
Jeanne de Fougères
Isabelle de Craon

Peerage of England
New creation	Countess of Pembroke; 1347–1348	Succeeded by Margaret of England
Preceded by Juliana Leyburne	Baroness Abergavenny; 1347–1348	Succeeded by Margaret of England
Preceded by Juliana Leyburne	Baroness Hastings; 1347–1348	Succeeded by Margaret of England
