= Maxstoke Castle =

Medieval castle in Warwickshire, England

- Maxstoke, Warwickshire, England
- Maxstoke Gardens

Site information
- Type: Quadrangular castle
- Owner: Fetherson-Dilke Family
- Open to the public: Annually
- Condition: Occupied

Location
- Coordinates: 52.4994°N 1.6729°W
- Grid reference: grid reference SP223891

Site history
- Materials: Sandstone

Listed Building – Grade I
- Official name: Maxstoke Castle
- Designated: 11 November 1952
- Reference no.: 1116166

Scheduled monument
- Official name: Maxstoke Castle
- Designated: 2 September 1935
- Reference no.: 1007723

Maxstoke Castle is a privately owned moated castle dating from the 14th century, situated to the north of Maxstoke in Warwickshire, England.

== History ==
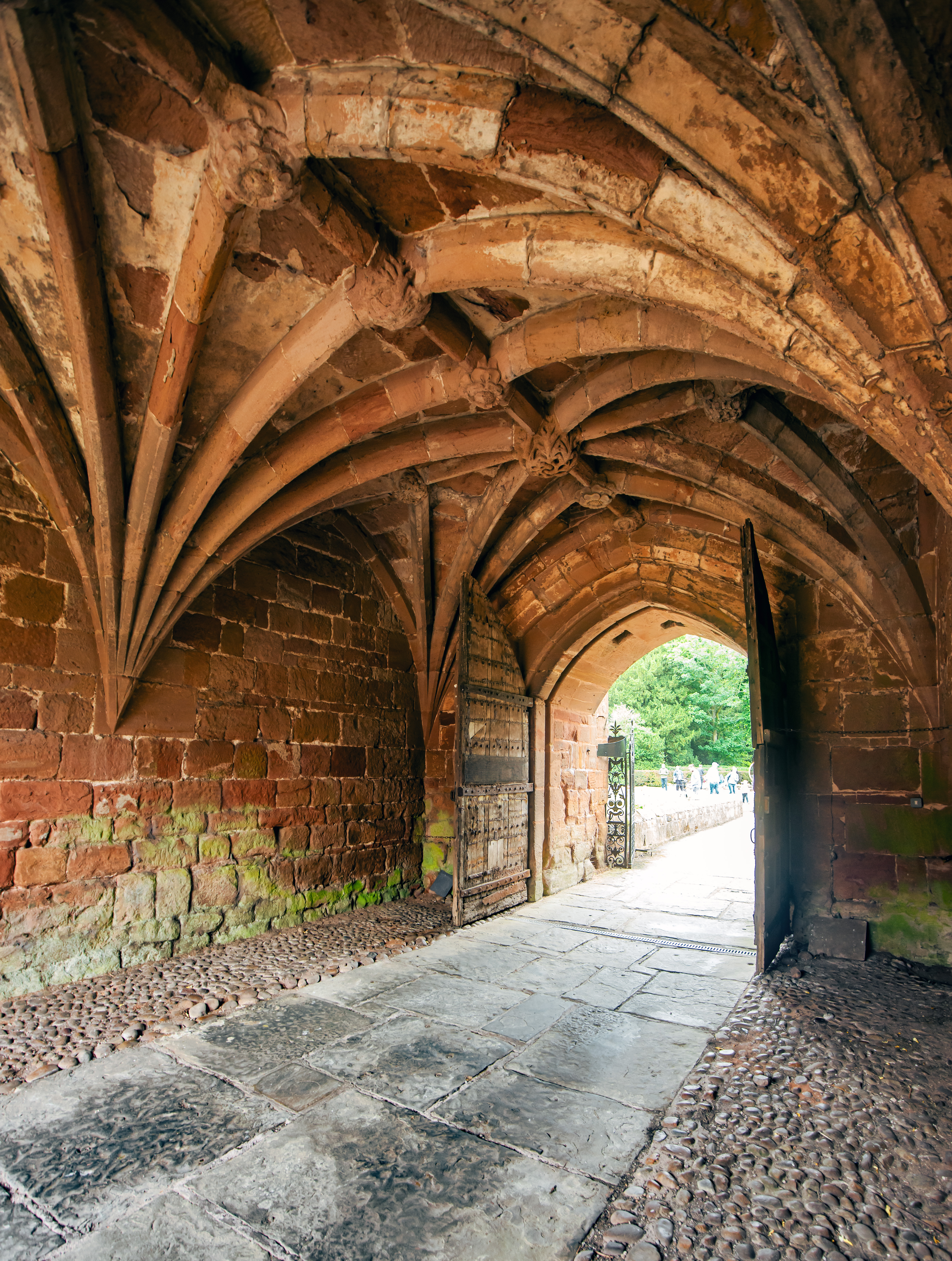
Vaulted entrance and 15th century doors

Maxstoke Castle was built by Sir William de Clinton, 1st Earl of Huntingdon, in 1345 to a rectangular plan. Octagonal towers were built at each angle, with a gatehouse built on the east and a residential range on the west. The whole of the castle structure was surrounded by a broad moat. Clinton died in 1354, but his widow, Juliana Leybourne, spent time here even after her next marriage. Additions were made by Humphrey Stafford, 1st Duke of Buckingham, who acquired it in 1437 by exchanging it for other manors in Northamptonshire. The castle is unusual in that it has survived largely intact.

Amongst the antiquities, there is a 15th-century chair upon which Henry VII was crowned after the Battle of Bosworth in 1485, a table owned by Sir Everard Digby (cousin to the Digbys of Coleshill) around which the Gunpowder Plot was planned in 1605, and a 'Whispering Door' (two doors with a common jamb) brought from Kenilworth Castle.

The present family, the Fetherston-Dilkes, first came into possession in the 17th century. During the Civil War, Maxstoke was garrisoned for Parliament. The first known Governor of Maxstoke Castle in 1642-43 was Captain Layfield. The garrison musters reveal that between March 1644 to October 1645, the captain of the garrison was Mr Henry Kendall Sr, lord of the manor of Austrey. His son, Henry Kendall Jr, was his lieutenant. The garrison included several of their Austrey tenants: William Smart (a joiner's son), Henry Orton, Henry Spencer and John Crispe.

In the 18th century, William Dilke of Maxstoke married Mary Fetherstone-Leigh of Packwood House near Knowle. Since then, the two families and houses have been closely linked.

== Current ==
Maxstoke Castle is opened to the public annually (usually in mid-June), in aid of local charities. Tours for interested historical groups can be booked year round. It is a Scheduled Ancient Monument and a Grade I listed building.

The parkland of Maxstoke has been a golf course since 1898. At one time, the land was listed as a deer park; deer can still be seen there today.

== See also ==
- Castles in Great Britain and Ireland
- List of castles in England
