= John Hastings, 2nd Baron Hastings =

English Baron (1287-1325)

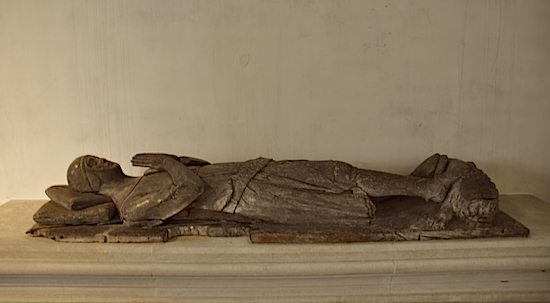
Effigy of John Hastings

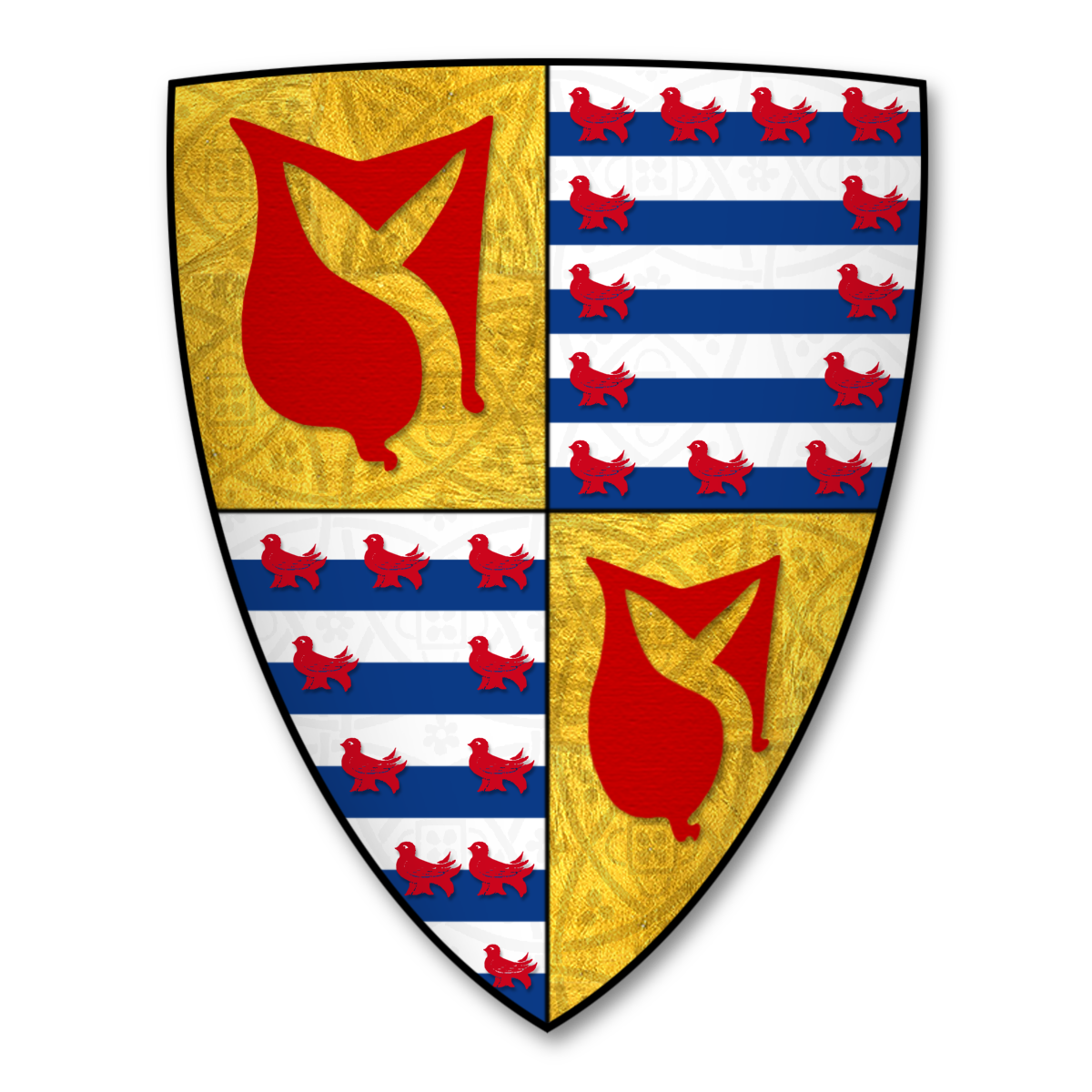
Coat of Arms of Hastings, Barons Hastings

John Hastings, 2nd Baron Hastings (29 September 1287 – 20 January 1325) was a medieval English Baron. He was Lord of the Manor of Hunningham.

== Descent ==
Hastings was the son of John Hastings, 1st Baron Hastings, also inheriting the title Baron Abergavenny from his father, and the grandson of Henry de Hastings, 1st Baron Hastings. His mother was Isabel, daughter of William de Valence, 1st Earl of Pembroke.

== Military career ==
He served in the First War of Scottish Independence under King Edward II and was also Governor of Kenilworth Castle.

== Succession ==
Lord Hastings died in January 1325, aged 37. He was survived by his widow Juliana de Leybourne and was succeeded in the Barony by his son Laurence, who was created Earl of Pembroke in 1339.

Peerage of England
Preceded by John Hastings	Baron Hastings; 1313–1325	Succeeded by Lawrence Hastings
