= Roger Mortimer, 1st Earl of March =

English nobleman (1287–1330)

Roger Mortimer
- Lord lieutenant of Ireland; Earl of March; Baron Mortimer of Wigmore
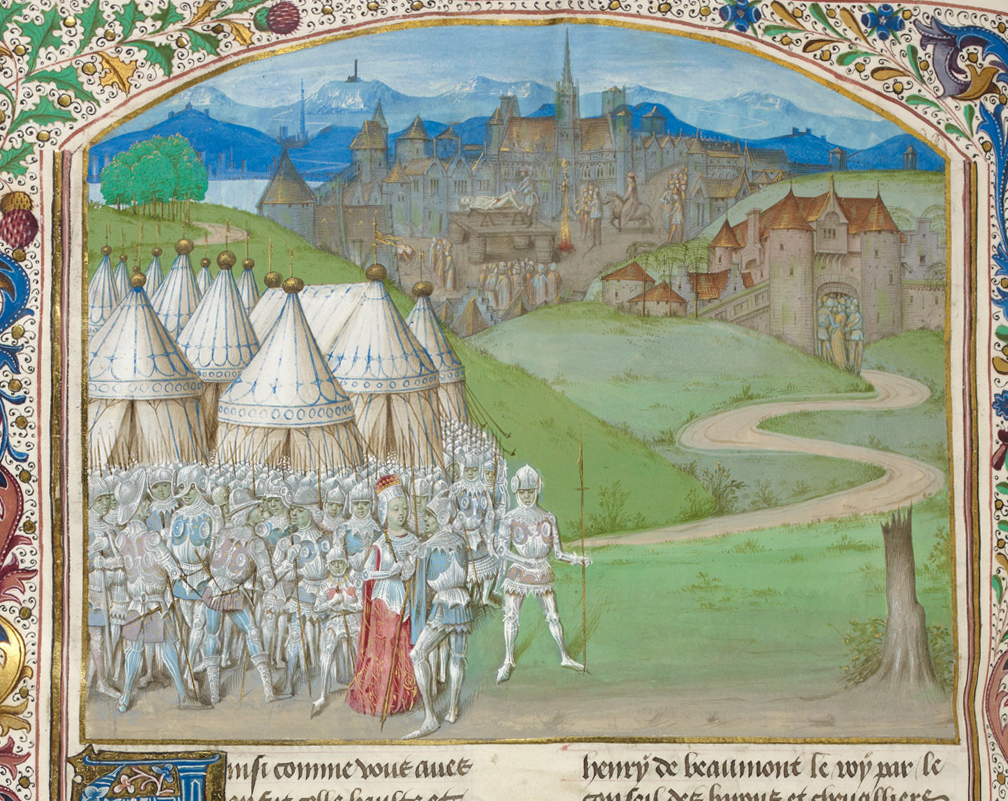
- 15th-century manuscript illustration depicting Roger Mortimer and Queen Isabella in the foreground. Background: Hugh Despenser the Younger on the scaffold, being emasculated
- Born: 25 April 1287; Wigmore Castle, Wigmore, Herefordshire, England
- Died: 29 November 1330 (aged 43); Tyburn, London
- Buried: Wigmore Abbey
- Noble family: Mortimer
- Spouse: Joan de Geneville, 2nd Baroness Geneville (m. 1301)
- Issue: Sir Edmund Mortimer; Margaret Mortimer; Roger Mortimer; Maud Mortimer; Geoffrey Mortimer; John Mortimer; Joan Mortimer; Isabella Mortimer; Katherine Mortimer, Countess of Warwick; Agnes Mortimer, Countess of Pembroke; Beatrice Mortimer; Blanche Mortimer
- Father: Edmund Mortimer, 2nd Baron Mortimer of Wigmore
- Mother: Margaret de Fiennes

Arms of Mortimer: Barry or and azure, on a chief of the first two pallets between two gyrons of the second over all an inescutcheon argent

Roger Mortimer, 3rd Baron Mortimer of Wigmore, 1st Earl of March (25 April 1287 – 29 November 1330), was an English nobleman and powerful marcher lord who gained many estates in the Welsh Marches and Ireland following his advantageous marriage to the wealthy heiress Joan de Geneville, 2nd Baroness Geneville. In November 1316, he was appointed Lord Lieutenant of Ireland. He was imprisoned in the Tower of London in 1322 for having led the marcher lords in a revolt against King Edward II in what became known as the Despenser War.

He later escaped to France, where he was joined by Edward's wife, Queen Isabella, where they had an affair. After he and Isabella led a successful invasion and rebellion, Edward was deposed; Mortimer allegedly arranged his murder at Berkeley Castle. For three years, Mortimer was de facto ruler of England before being himself overthrown by Isabella and Edward's eldest son, Edward III. Accused of assuming royal power and other crimes, Mortimer was executed by hanging at Tyburn.

== Early life ==
Mortimer, grandson of Roger Mortimer, 1st Baron Mortimer of Wigmore, and Maud de Braose, was born at Wigmore Castle, Herefordshire, England, the firstborn of marcher lord Edmund Mortimer, 2nd Baron Mortimer of Wigmore, and Margaret de Fiennes. Through his mother Margaret, he was a great-grandson of John of Brienne, Emperor of Constantinople and King of Jerusalem. Through his father he was descended from John, King of England.

Edmund Mortimer was a second son, intended for minor orders and a clerical career. But on the deaths of his elder brother Ralph in 1274, and his father in 1304, Edmund was recalled from Oxford University and succeeded to the title. He married in 1301.

Roger was born on 25 April 1287, the Feast of Saint Mark, a day of bad omen. He shared this birthday with King Edward II, which would be relevant later in life.

According to his biographer Ian Mortimer, Roger was possibly sent as a boy to be fostered in the household of his formidable uncle, Roger Mortimer de Chirk. De Chirk had helped Edmund kill Llywelyn ap Gruffudd of Wales in 1282 and had then carried Llywelyn's severed head to King Edward I. Ironically, Roger was a cousin of Llywelyn via his great-grandmother, Gwladus Ddu.

Roger attended the coronation of Edward II on 25 February 1308 and carried a table bearing the royal robes in the ceremony's procession.

== Marriage ==
Like many noble children of his time, Mortimer was betrothed at a young age, to Joan de Geneville (born 1286), the daughter of Sir Peter de Geneville, of Trim Castle and Ludlow. They were married on 20 September 1301 when he was aged fourteen. Their first child was born in 1302.

Through his marriage, Mortimer not only acquired numerous possessions in the Welsh Marches, including the important Ludlow Castle, which became the chief stronghold of the Mortimers, but also extensive estates and influence in Ireland. However, Joan de Geneville was not an "heiress" at the time of her marriage. Her grandfather Geoffrey de Geneville, at the age of eighty in 1308, conveyed most, but not all, of his Irish lordships to Mortimer, and then retired: he finally died in 1314, with Joan succeeding as suo jure 2nd Baroness Geneville. During his lifetime Geoffrey also conveyed much of the remainder of his legacy, such as Kenlys, to his younger son Simon de Geneville, who had meanwhile become Baron of Culmullin through marriage to Joanna FitzLeon. Mortimer, therefore, succeeded to the eastern part of the Lordship of Meath, centred on Trim and its stronghold of Trim Castle. He did not succeed, however, to the Lordship of Fingal. (Note: Fingal descended firstly to Simon de Geneville (whose son Laurence predeceased him), and thence through his heiress daughter Elizabeth to her husband William de Londres, and next through their heiress daughter, also Elizabeth, to Sir Christopher Preston, and finally to the Viscounts Gormanston.)

== Military adventures in Ireland and Wales ==
Mortimer's childhood came to an abrupt end when his father was mortally wounded in a skirmish near Builth in July 1304. Since Mortimer was underage at the death of his father, he was placed by King Edward I under the guardianship of Piers Gaveston, 1st Earl of Cornwall. However, on 22 May 1306, in a lavish ceremony in Westminster Abbey with 259 others, he was knighted by Edward and granted livery of his full inheritance.

His adult life began in earnest in 1308, when he went to Ireland in person to enforce his authority. This brought him into conflict with the de Lacys, who turned for support to Edward Bruce, brother of Robert Bruce, King of Scots. Mortimer was appointed Lord Lieutenant of Ireland by Edward II on 23 November 1316. Shortly afterwards, at the head of a large army, he drove Bruce to Carrickfergus and the de Lacys into Connaught, wreaking vengeance on their adherents whenever they were to be found. He returned to England and Wales in 1318 and was then occupied for some years with baronial disputes on the Welsh border.

== Opposition to Edward II ==
Mortimer became disaffected with his king and joined the growing opposition to Edward II and the Despensers. After the younger Despenser was granted lands belonging to him, he and the marchers began conducting devastating raids against Despenser's property in Wales. He supported Humphrey de Bohun, 4th Earl of Hereford, in refusing to obey the king's summons to appear before him in 1321 as long as "the younger Despencer was in the King's train." Mortimer led a march against London, his men wearing the Mortimer uniform which was green with a yellow sleeve. He was prevented from entering the capital, although his forces put it under siege. These acts of insurrection compelled the Lords Ordainers led by Thomas, 2nd Earl of Lancaster, to order the king to banish the Despensers in August. When the king led a successful expedition in October against Margaret de Clare, Baroness Badlesmere, after she had refused Queen Isabella admittance to Leeds Castle, he used his victory and new popularity among the moderate lords and the people to summon the Despensers back to England. Mortimer, in company with other Marcher Lords, led a rebellion against Edward, which is known as the Despenser War.

In January 1322, Mortimer attacked and burnt Bridgnorth but, being heavily outnumbered, was forced to surrender to the king at Shrewsbury. Mortimer joined Lancaster at the Battle of Boroughbridge in March 1322 and warrants for his arrest were issued in July.

A death sentence was passed upon Mortimer but this was commuted to life imprisonment and he was consigned to the Tower of London. On 1 August 1323, Mortimer, aided by Bishop Adam Orleton of Hereford and Gerald de Alspaye, the sub-lieutenant or valet of the Tower's Constable, drugged the warders during a feast, allowing Mortimer to escape. He attempted to capture Windsor and Wallingford Castles to free imprisoned Contrariants. Mortimer eventually fled to France, pursued by warrants for his capture dead or alive. (Note: Stones 1951 corrected the traditional date of 1324 offered in one uncorroborated source.)

In the following year Queen Isabella, anxious to escape from her husband, obtained his consent to her going to France to use her influence with her brother, King Charles IV, in favour of peace. At the French court, the queen found Mortimer, who became her lover soon afterwards. At his instigation, she refused to return to England so long as the Despensers retained power as the king's favourites.

Historians have speculated as to the date at which Mortimer and Isabella actually became lovers. The modern view is that the affair began while both were still in England and that after a disagreement, Isabella abandoned Mortimer to his fate in the Tower. His subsequent escape became one of medieval England's most colourful episodes. However, almost certainly Isabella risked everything by chancing Mortimer's companionship and emotional support when they first met again in Paris four years later (Christmas 1325). King Charles IV's protection of Isabella at the French court from Despenser's would-be assassins played a large part in developing the relationship. (Note: "The Queen has come of her own free will, and may freely return when she so wishes. But if she prefers to remain in these parts, she is my sister, and I refuse to expel her." quoted in Weir 2005, p. 181, from the "Vita Edwardi Secundi".)

In 1326, Mortimer moved as Prince Edward's guardian to Hainault, but only after a furious dispute with the queen, demanding she remain in France. (Note: Mortimer threatened to "slit her throat" if she returned to Edward and England. A threat he would live to regret when tried by the new King Edward III.)

Isabella retired to raise troops in her County of Ponthieu; Mortimer arranged the invasion fleet supplied by the Hainaulters and an army supplied by his supporters back in England, who had been sending him aid and advice since at least March 1326.

== Invasion of England and defeat of Edward II ==
The scandal of Isabella's relations with Mortimer compelled them both to withdraw from the French court to Flanders, where they obtained assistance for an invasion of England from Count William of Hainaut, although Isabella did not arrive from Ponthieu until the fleet was due to sail. Landing in the River Orwell on 24 September 1326, they were accompanied by Prince Edward and Henry, Earl of Lancaster. London rose in support of the queen, and Edward took flight to the west, pursued by Mortimer and Isabella. After wandering helplessly for some weeks in Wales, the king was taken prisoner on 16 November and was compelled to abdicate in favour of his son. Though the latter was crowned as Edward III of England on 1 February 1327, the country was ruled by Mortimer and Isabella. On 21 September that same year, Edward II died in captivity. The suspicious death of Edward II has been the subject of many conspiracy theories, including that Mortimer's men killed him, but none has been proven.

== Powers won and lost ==
Following the removal of the Despensers, Mortimer set to work restoring the status of his supporters, primarily in the Marches, and hundreds of pardons and restorations of property were made in the first year of the new king's reign. Rich estates and offices of profit and power were heaped on Mortimer. He was made constable of Wallingford Castle and in September 1328 he was created Earl of March. However, although in military terms he was far more competent than the Despensers, his ambition was troubling to all. His own son Geoffrey, the only one to survive into old age, mocked him as "the king of folly" deriding his ambitious extravagance of "rich clothes ot of manner resoun, both of shaping and wearing". During his short time as ruler of England he took over the lordships of Denbigh, Oswestry and Clun (the first of which belonged to Despenser, the latter two had been the Earl of Arundel's). He was also granted the marcher lordship of Montgomery by the queen.

The jealousy and anger of many nobles were aroused by Mortimer's use of power, which in many ways was tenuous. In 1328 Simon de Mepham, reportedly a Lancastrian at court, was elected Archbishop of Canterbury without controversy. However, the feuding would not stop. The day Parliament opened on 15 October Thomas of Lancaster's nemesis, Sir Robert Holland was murdered by highway robbers. Whereupon March swore on Mepham's cross that he knew nothing of it. Nonetheless, the King decreed an indictment; he would be judged at law against the standards of the Magna Carta. With Parliament adjourned on 31 October, he was able to slip away to his estates on the Marches. The two earls' lethal enmity, and enforced absence from the King's presence, rendered their motives almost equally suspect to rowdy Londoners. The young king would have to raise an army of archers if he was to defend his throne from a northern rebellion controlled by Lancaster. In charge of the army, Lancaster blamed Mortimer and his queen for the debacle, and the highly contentious Treaty of Edinburgh–Northampton with the Scots.

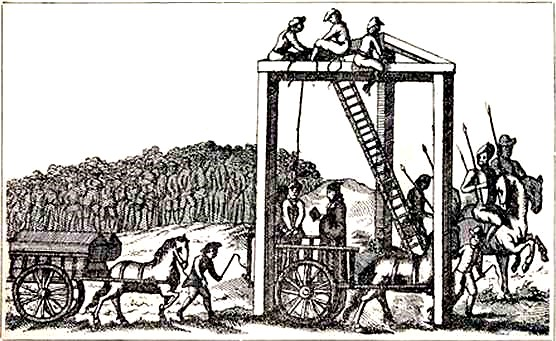
The "Tyburn Tree"

Henry, Earl of Lancaster, one of the principals behind Edward II's deposition, tried to overthrow Mortimer, but the action was ineffective as the young king passively stood by. Then, in March 1330, Mortimer ordered the execution of Edmund, Earl of Kent, the half-brother of Edward II. After this execution Henry Lancaster prevailed upon the young king, Edward III, to assert his independence. In October 1330, a Parliament was summoned to Nottingham, just days before Edward's eighteenth birthday, and Mortimer and Isabella were seized by Edward and his companions from inside Nottingham Castle via an underground tunnel. In spite of Isabella's entreaty to her son, "Fair son, have pity on the gentle Mortimer", Mortimer was conveyed to the Tower. Accused of assuming royal power and of various other high misdemeanours, he was condemned without trial and hanged at Tyburn on 29 November 1330, his vast estates forfeited to the crown. His body hung at the gallows for two days and nights in full view of the populace. Mortimer's widow Joan received a pardon in 1336 and survived until 1356. She was buried beside Mortimer at Wigmore, but the site was later destroyed.

In 2002, the actor John Challis, the owner of the remaining buildings of Wigmore Abbey, invited the BBC programme House Detectives at Large to investigate his property. During the investigation, a document was discovered in which Mortimer's widow Joan petitioned Edward III for the return of her husband's body so she could bury it at Wigmore Abbey. Mortimer's lover Isabella had buried his body at Greyfriars in Coventry following his hanging. Edward III replied, "Let his body rest in peace". The king later relented, and Mortimer's body was transferred to Wigmore Abbey, where Joan was later buried beside him.

== Children ==
The marriages of Mortimer's children (four sons and eight daughters) cemented Mortimer's strengths in the West:

- Sir Edmund Mortimer (1302/1303 – 16 December 1331), married Elizabeth de Badlesmere; they produced Roger Mortimer, 2nd Earl of March, who was restored to his grandfather's title;
- Margaret Mortimer (1304 – 5 May 1337), married Thomas de Berkeley, 3rd Baron Berkeley;
- Roger Mortimer (1305–1328), married Joan Butler;
- Maud Mortimer (1307 – after 1345), married John de Charlton, Lord of Powys;
- Geoffrey Mortimer (1308/1309 – 1372/1376), who inherited the French seigneurie of Couhé as the assigned heir of his grandmother Joan of Lusignan, and founded a branch of the family based in France;
- John Mortimer (c. 1310 – 1328);
- Joan Mortimer (c. 1311/1312 – 1337/1351), married James Audley, 2nd Baron Audley;
- Isabel Mortimer (c. 1313 – after 1327);
- Katherine Mortimer (c. 1314 – 4 August 1369), married Thomas de Beauchamp, 11th Earl of Warwick;
- Agnes Mortimer (c. 1317 – 25 July 1368), married Laurence Hastings, 1st Earl of Pembroke;
- Beatrice Mortimer (c. 1319 – 16 October 1383), who married, firstly, Edward of Norfolk (died before 9 August 1334), son and heir apparent of Thomas of Brotherton, by whom she had no issue, and, secondly, before 13 September 1337, Thomas de Brewes (died 9 or 16 June 1361), by whom she had three sons and three daughters;
- Blanche Mortimer (c. 1321 – 1347), married Peter de Grandison, 2nd Baron Grandison.

== Descendants ==
Through his son Sir Edmund Mortimer, he is an ancestor of the last Plantagenet monarchs of England from kings Edward IV to Richard III. By Edward IV's daughter, Elizabeth of York, the Earl of March is an ancestor to King Henry VIII of England and King James V of Scotland, and therefore to all subsequent Scottish, English and British monarchs.

== In fiction ==
Mortimer appears in Christopher Marlowe's play Edward II (c. 1592), the Restoration tragedy Edward III (1690), as well as Bertolt Brecht's The Life of Edward II of England (1923). In Derek Jarman's film Edward II (1991), based on Marlowe's play, he is portrayed by Nigel Terry.

Mortimer is also a character in Les Rois maudits (The Accursed Kings), a series of French historical novels by Maurice Druon. He was portrayed by Claude Giraud in the 1972 French miniseries adaptation of the series, and by Bruno Todeschini in the 2005 adaptation. Mortimer is also briefly mentioned in the 2001 film A Knight's Tale as a contestant in a joust.

Mortimer is also a character in World Without End played by Hannes Jaenicke.

== Notes ==
Peerage of England
New creation	Earl of March; 1328–1330	Forfeit Title next held by Roger Mortimer
Preceded by Edmund Mortimer	Baron Mortimer of Wigmore; 1304–1330	Forfeit Title next held by Roger Mortimer
