= Greyfriars, Coventry =

Medieval spire in Coventry, England

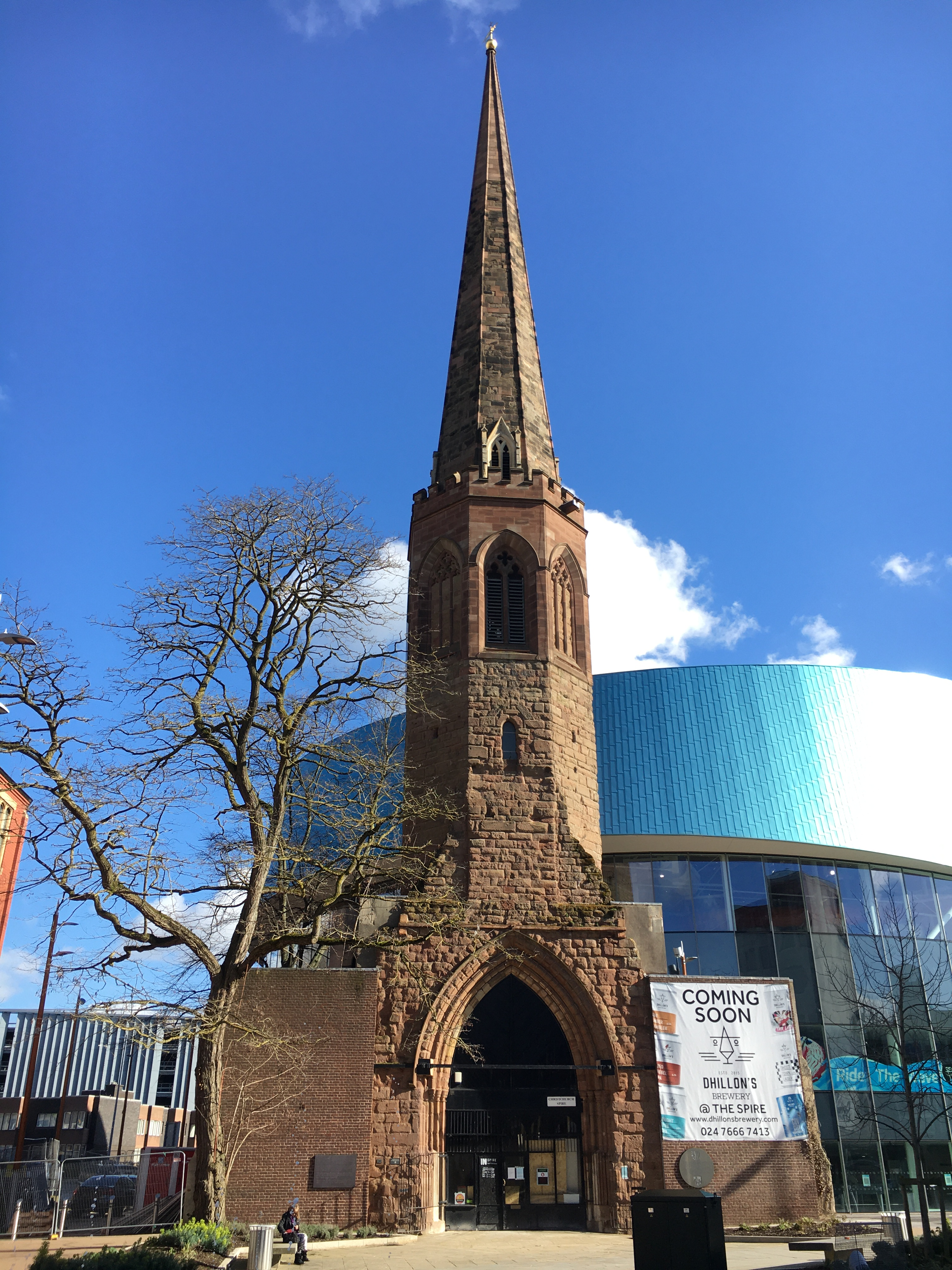
- A view of Christchurch Spire
- Interactive map of the Greyfriars, Coventry area
- Alternative names: Christchurch Spire

General information
- Type: Spire
- Location: New Union Street, Coventry, United Kingdom
- Coordinates: 52.40574°N 1.51153°W
- Construction started: c.1350
- Completed: c.1359
- Renovated: 1950

Greyfriars was a medieval Franciscan priory in Coventry, England. The original monastic buildings were lost in the English Reformation; the spire standing on the site today was most recently part of a 19th-century church that was destroyed in an air raid in the Second World War. The spire, also called Christchurch Steeple, is a Grade II* listed building.

== History ==
The first mention of the Franciscans or Greyfriars in Coventry is in the Pipe Rolls of 1234, which show Henry III allowing them timber to use for their oratory or church. From later documents it is evident that Ranulf de Blondeville, Earl of Chester, permitted them to erect their house on his manor of Cheylesmore, on the south-west side of the city.

In August 1289, Roger de Montalt granted the Franciscan friars of Coventry a site for the enlargement of their area. He also obtained a licence, contrary to the wishes of the monks of Coventry, to close the way leading from Kenilworth to Coventry, but this was on condition he made another way on the adjacent land also granted to them by Roger.

In 1359, Richard II granted the Grey Friars as much stone from the quarry in the Black Prince's park at Cheylesmore as they needed for their house. He also granted free access for their workmen for the quarried stone. A grant was given for the right to dig earth for the walls and plaster, and for a postern gate, or secret gate, into Cheylesmore park for the recreation of the friars. They were not, however, to pass beyond the quarry. The key to the gate was to be kept by the warden, and it was only to be used by those who were sick.

The Franciscan friars, or Greyfriars, were content with very humble churches as well as conventual buildings. Through the years, however, their supporters erected churches on their site. In about 1300, the Hastings family built a chapel on the north side of the friars' church, where several generations of the family were buried. John Ward, the first mayor of the city, was also buried in the church of the Greyfriars in 1348.

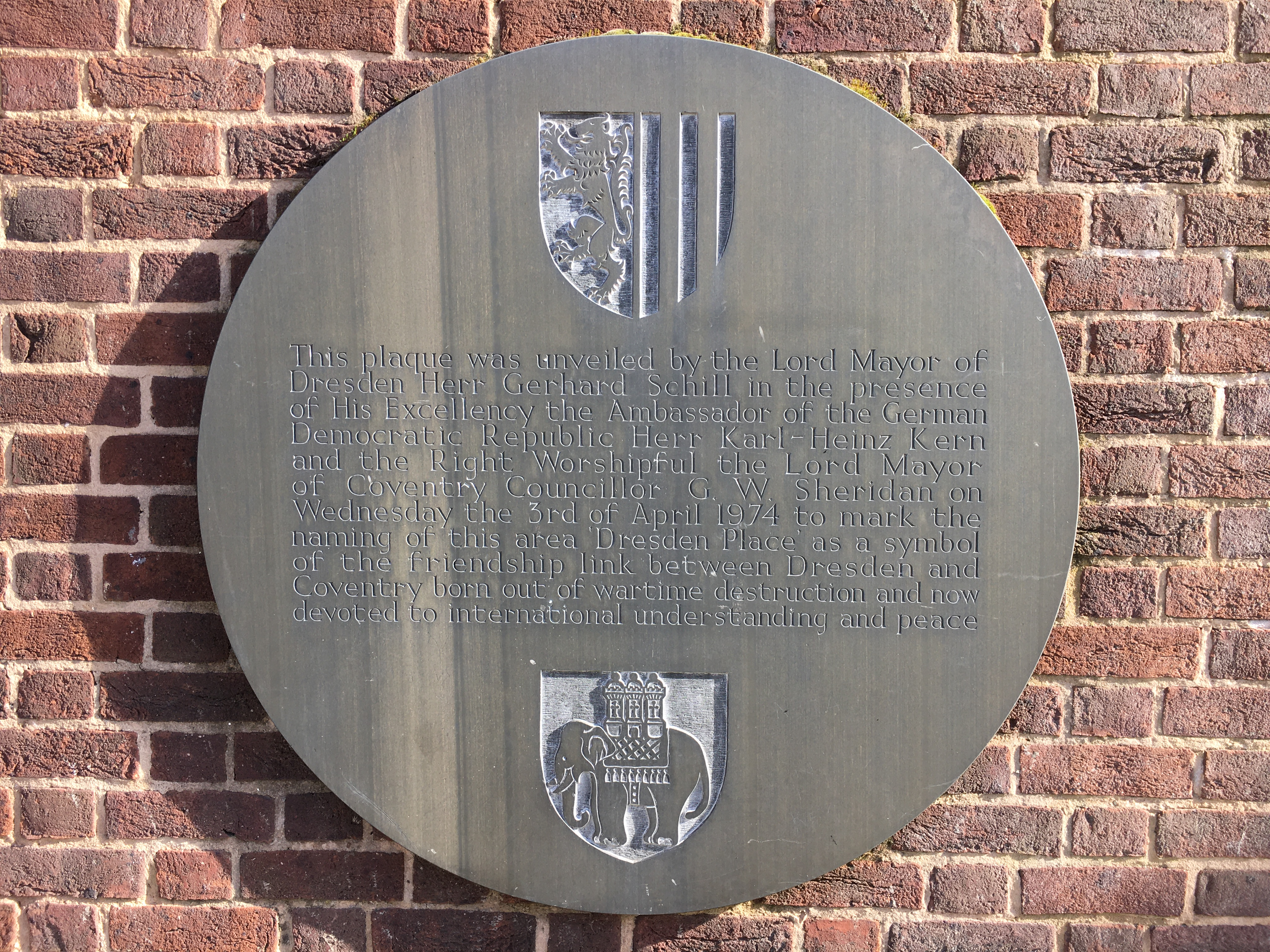
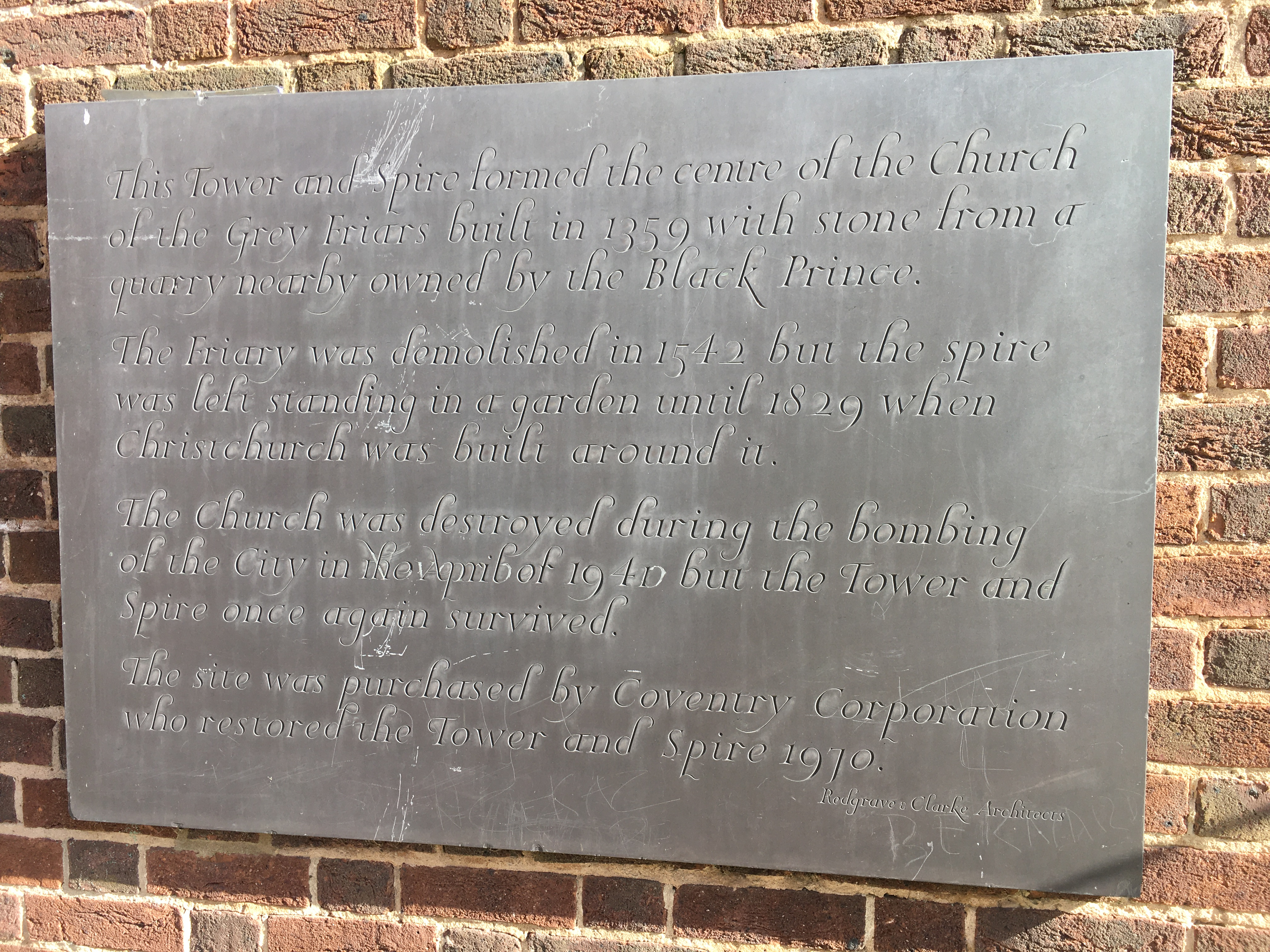
Two plaques displayed on Christchurch spire, one giving a brief history, the other commemorating the naming of Dresden Place

== Dissolution ==
Greyfriars church was located in the centre of Coventry, between New Union Street and Warwick Lane, and it was originally 240 feet in length by 60 feet wide. The structure was cruciform in shape, and straddled the centrally placed spire. It became victim to Henry VIII's dissolution of the monasteries in 1538, but the tower and spire survived.

== Rebuilding ==
In the early 1800s, Coventry's population was on the increase, and through donations and subscription, money was raised to rebuild the church. At this time, the tower and spire were owned by Coventry corporation, who gave it to the church for the rebuilding in the mid-1820s. The second half of the decade was taken up with clearing the land around the spire, which had been built on in the years since the Dissolution.

On 16 March 1830 the foundation stone was laid for the new church. By mid-1832, rebuilding was complete, and on 3 August of the same year, a consecration ceremony was held for the now-named Christ Church, Coventry. Due to the constraints of the site, the new church was only 124 feet in length and 55 feet wide, with the spire at one end of the church, rather than in its original central position: thus the chancel of the new church was in the base of the medieval spire.

The new, second church did not survive as long as the first, as it was largely destroyed in a World War II air raid on 8 April 1941. The remains of the walls were demolished in the spring of 1950, exposing again the tower and spire of the old church.

== Burials at Greyfriars ==
- Henry de Hastings, 1st Baron Hastings and wife Joan de Cantilupe
- John Hastings, 1st Baron Hastings

== See also ==
- Grade II* listed buildings in Coventry
