= Laurence Hastings, 1st Earl of Pembroke =

English nobleman (1319–1348)

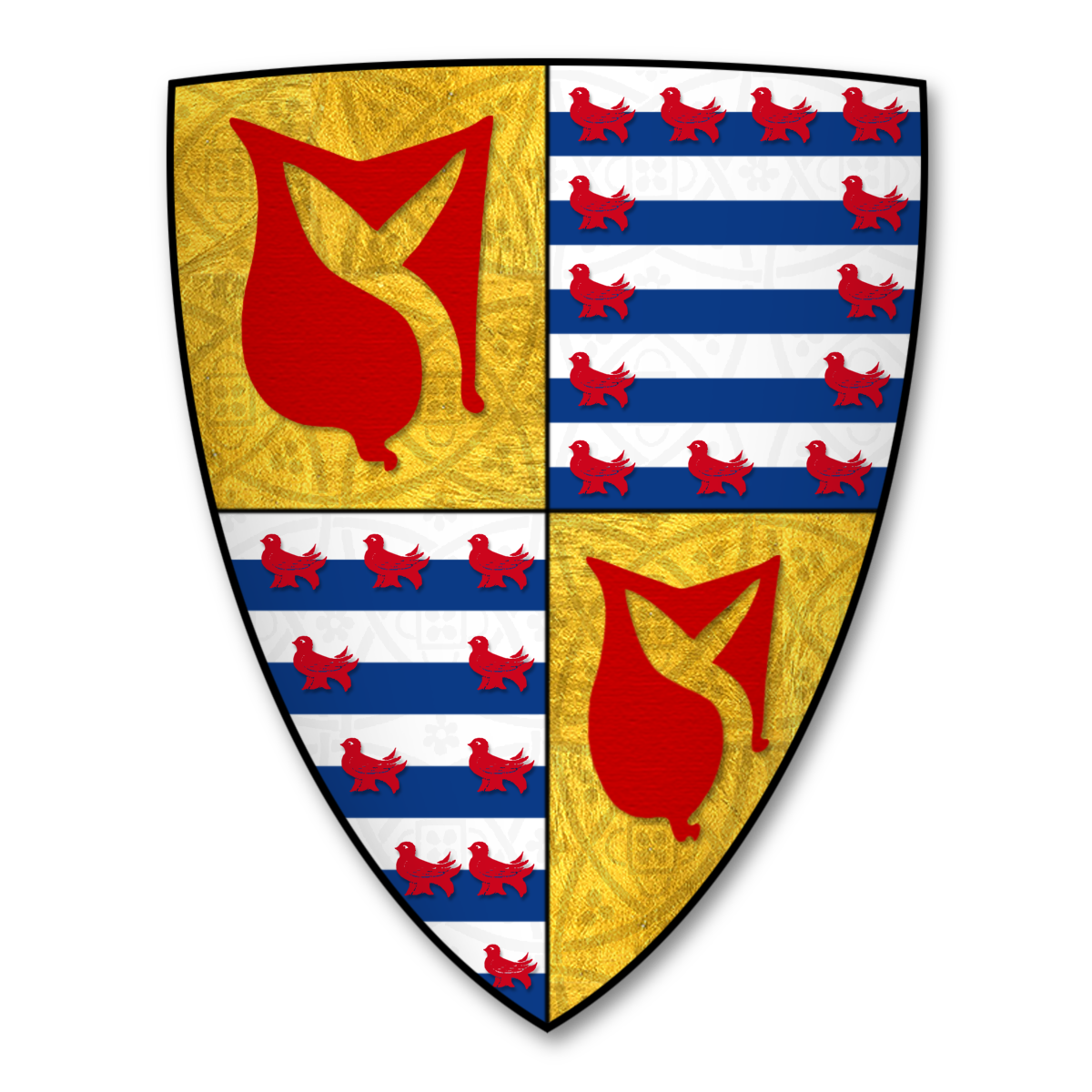
Coat of Arms of Hastings, Earls of Pembroke

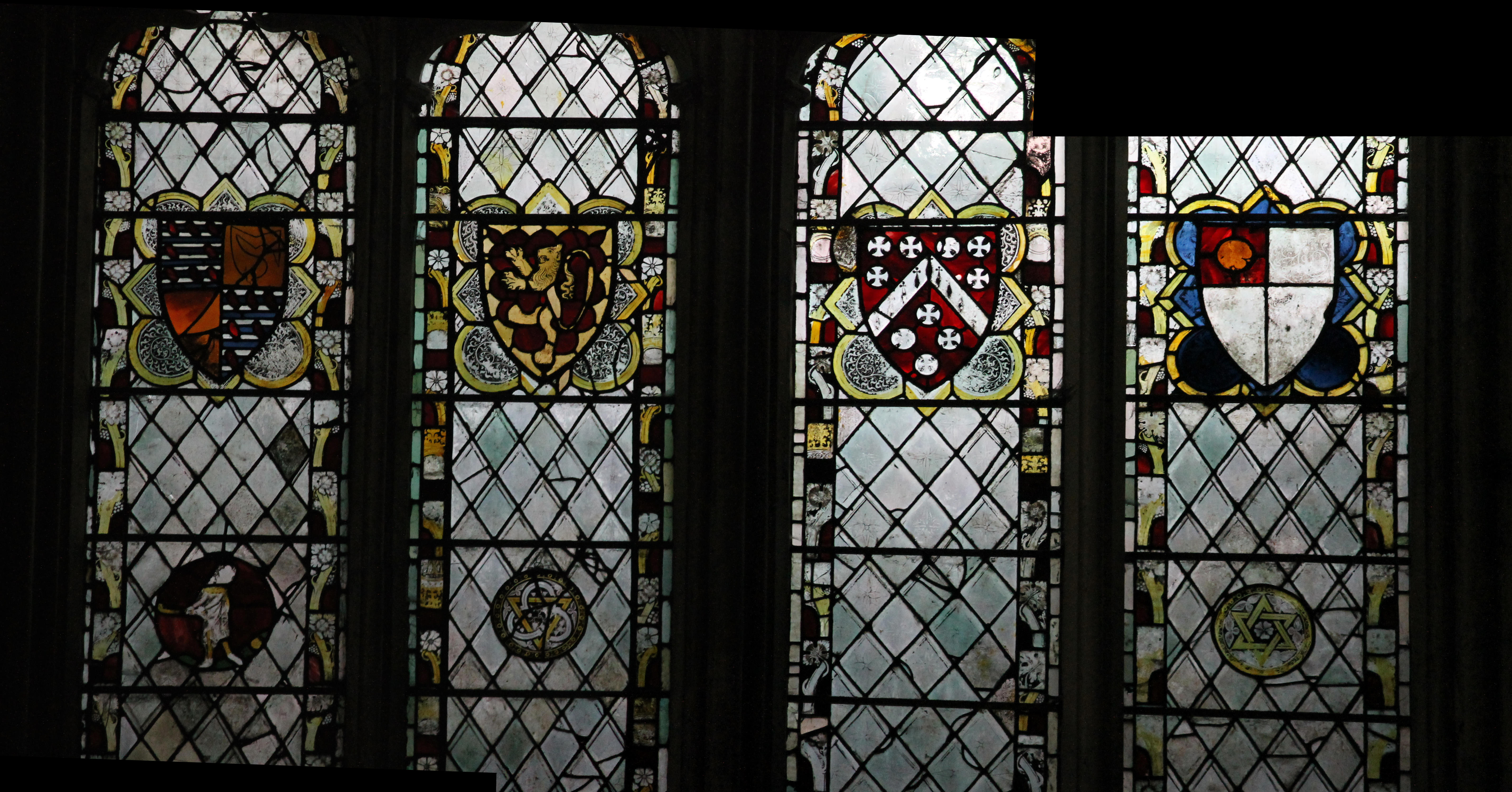
Arms ofLaurence de Hastings, 1st Earl of Pembroke, together with those of other knights who fought in the Battle of Crecy and at the Siege of Calais (1347), Great East Window of Gloucester Cathedral

Laurence de Hastings, 1st Earl of Pembroke (20 March 1319 – 20 August 1348) was an English nobleman and held the titles 1st Earl of Pembroke (4th creation), Baron Abergavenny and Baron Hastings under Edward II of England and Edward III of England.

== Family ==
His father was John Hastings, 2nd Baron Hastings and his mother Juliana Leybourne. He was born at Allesley in Warwickshire and christened at Allesley on the same day. As a great-grandson of William de Valence, 1st Earl of Pembroke, and having inherited through the female line a portion of the estates of the Valence earls, he was created (or recognized as) a new creation of the earl of Pembroke in October 1339.

He married Lady Agnes Mortimer (1317 – 25 July 1368), the daughter of Roger de Mortimer, 1st Earl of March with whom he had one son:

- John Hastings, 2nd Earl of Pembroke (1347–1375)

== Death ==
He died at Abergavenny Castle in 1348 and is buried in the Priory Church of St Mary, Abergavenny.

Peerage of England
New creation	Earl of Pembroke; 1339–1348	Succeeded by John Hastings
Preceded by John Hastings	Baron Abergavenny; Baron Hastings; 1325–1348	Succeeded by John Hastings
