= Marcelin Beaussier =

19th century French military interpreter

- Born: François-Louis-Marcelin Beaussier; 23 April 1821; Paris
- Died: 3 February 1873 (aged 51); Algiers
- Occupations: Military man Orientalist

François-Louis-Marcelin Beaussier (23 April 1821 – 3 February 1873) was a 19th-century French military man and orientalist.

== Biography ==
Born in Paris to a family originally from Marseille which, in the eighteenth century, gave several consuls and leaders of trade centers in North Africa, Marcelin Beaussier studied Arabic in Tunisia.

=== In the army ===
In 1844 he embraced the career of military interpreter in Algeria where he was distinguished for his swift preparation to reach the highest degree:

- auxiliary interpreter: 31 March 1844;
- titular interpreter of 3rd class: 13 March 1845;
- titular interpreter of 2nd class: 30 December 1846;
- titular interpreter of 1st class: 6 February 1850;
- principal interpreter: 10 December 1854.

He seriously joined his passion for studies to military commitment. He participated in expeditions in Kabylia and the Sahara, receiving three mentions for his courage by General de Saint-Arnaud. Then he distinguished himself particularly in 1859 during a campaign on the borders of Morocco where the troops were suffering from cholera. His devotion in such experiences earned him a further mention.

=== Studies ===
Early physically worn down because of the great deal of effort he made in the military - in the last years of life, while remaining active as an interpreter - Beaussier focused on his scientific activities, in particular by participating actively in the life of the Société historique algérienne of which he was a member.

But the work which is associated to his name is the first great dictionary of spoken Arabic, which was published two years before his death and that had several reprints, the last being in 2007. It is still a reference work essential for the understanding of the modern Arab lexicon, especially in the regions of North Africa.

== Honours ==
Marcelin Beaussier was awarded the honors of chevalier and then officier of the Legion d'honneur, and recipient of the Order of Glory of Tunisia.

== Bibliography ==
- Laurent-Charles Féraud, Les interprètes de l'armée d'Afrique (archives du corps), Alger, Jourdan, 1876

== Works ==
- Marcelin Beaussier, Dictionnaire pratique arabe-français, Alger, Bouyer, 1871 (XII-764-XVI p.)
- Marcelin Beaussier, Mohamed Ben Cheneb, Dictionnaire pratique arabe-français, Paris, Ibis Press, 2007 - ISBN 978-2-910728-55-7 [Fac-simile of Supplément au Dictionnaire pratique arabe français de Marcelin Beaussier, Alger, La maison des livres, 1959; with a preface by Jérôme Lentin]
