= The Battle of Castillon (painting) =

Painting by Charles-Philippe Larivière

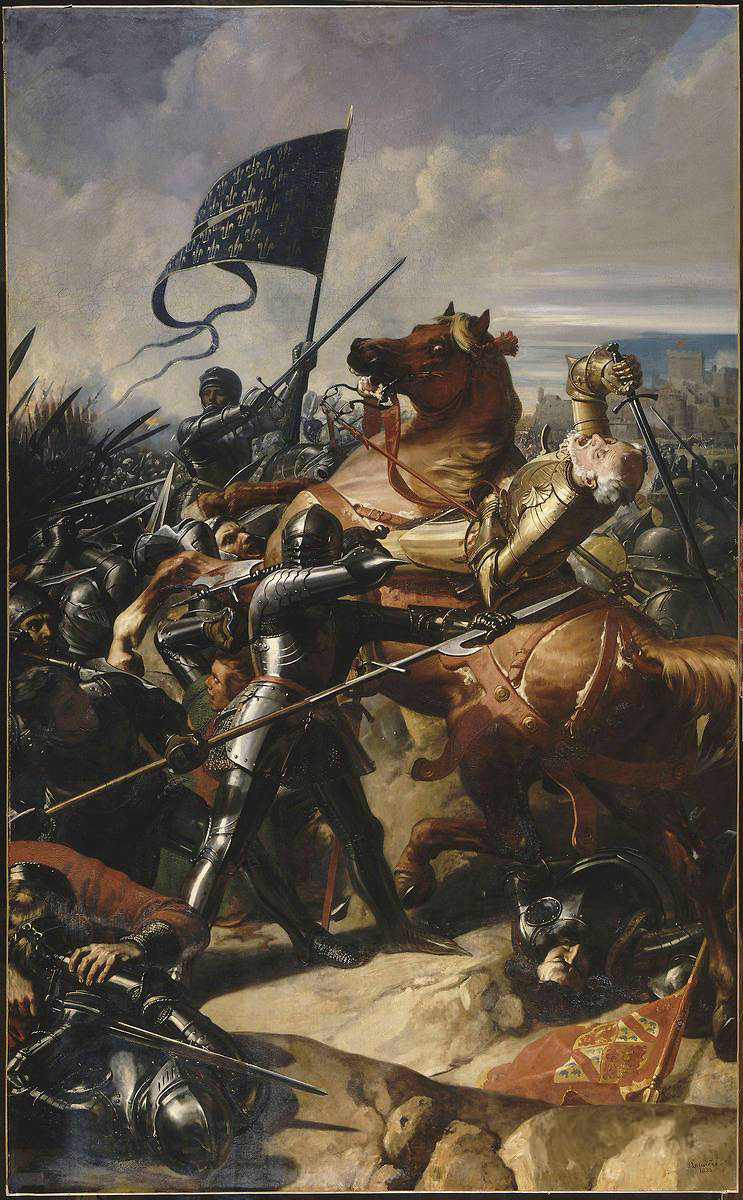
- Artist: Charles-Philippe Larivière
- Year: 1839
- Medium: Oil on canvas
- Dimensions: 425 cm × 262 cm (167 in × 103 in)
- Location: Palace of Versailles, Versailles

The Battle of Castillon (French: Bataille de Castillon) is an 1839 history painting by the French artist Charles-Philippe Larivière. It depicts the Battle of Castillon fought on 17 July 1453 during the Hundred Years' War. The large painting portrays the moment that the English commander John Talbot, 1st Earl of Shrewsbury, was killed.

The painting was commissioned by the French monarch Louis Philippe I for the new Musée de l'Histoire de France at a cost of 8,000 Francs. It was displayed at the Salon of 1839 at the Louvre in Paris and hangs in the Galerie des Batailles at Versailles.

== Bibliography ==
- Ellis-Gorman, Stuart. Castillon: The Last Battle of the Hundred Years War. Pen and Sword Military, 2025.
- Gervereau, Laurent. La guerre sans dentelles. Skira-Flammarion, 2009.
