= Castillonnais (Gironde) =

Area of Gascony, France

Castillonnais is a small area of Gascony, France in the North East of the Gironde department, North of the Dordogne River and East of the Libournais area. Its main town, Castillon-la-Bataille, was the site of the last battle of the Hundred Years' War.

Every summer, an impressive "sound and light" spectacular is held in remembrance of this event, and draws in a large crowd. Castillonnais is also a winemaking are, whose appellation is Côtes de Castillon.
