= Castillon-la-Bataille =

- Commune
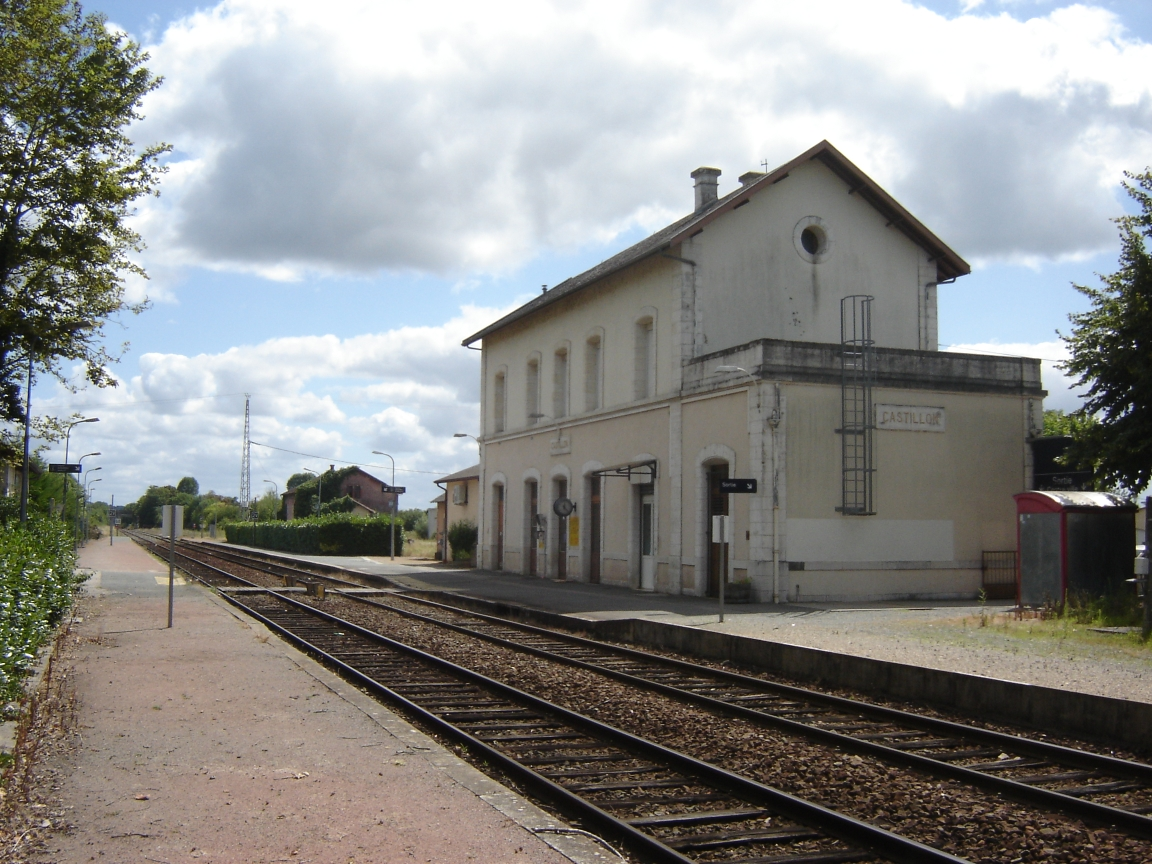
- Train station

- Coat of arms
- Location of Castillon-la-Bataille
- Location within France Location within Nouvelle-Aquitaine
- Coordinates: 44°51′14″N 0°02′35″W
- Country: France
- Region: Nouvelle-Aquitaine
- Department: Gironde
- Arrondissement: Libourne
- Canton: Les Coteaux de Dordogne
- Intercommunality: Castillon-Pujols

Government
  - Mayor (2020–2026): Jacques Breillat
- Area^{1}: 5.68 km^{2} (2.19 sq mi)
- Elevation: 27 m (89 ft)
- Highest elevation: 104 m (341 ft)
- Lowest elevation: 2 m (6.6 ft)
- Population (2023): 3,344
  - Density: 589/km^{2} (1,520/sq mi)
- Time zone: UTC+01:00 (CET)
  - Summer (DST): UTC+02:00 (CEST)
- INSEE/Postal code: 33108 /33350
- ^{1} French Land Register data, which excludes lakes, ponds, glaciers > 1 km^{2} (0.386 sq mi or 247 acres) and river estuaries.

Castillon-la-Bataille (French pronunciation: [kastijɔ̃ la bataj]; Occitan: Castilhon de la Batalha) is a commune in the Gironde department in Nouvelle-Aquitaine in southwestern France. It lies on the right (northern) bank of the river Dordogne. Castillon station has rail connections to Bordeaux, Bergerac and Sarlat-la-Canéda.

This area was the site of the last battle of the Hundred Years' War, the Battle of Castillon, fought 17 July 1453. The battle in which John Talbot, 1st Earl of Shrewsbury, charged valiantly but foolishly at the French artillery and was slain at the age of nearly 70, along with his son, John Talbot, 1st Viscount Lisle, and most of the small English force that had gone out to prevent Bordeaux falling to the French king.

Near La Mothe-Montraval, on the right bank of the Dordogne, a tumulus is pointed out under the name of Talbot's tomb; but it is known that his body was removed by his friends to St Alkmund's Church, Whitchurch, in Shropshire in England. On 27 November 1953, the name of the town was changed from Castillon-sur-Dordogne to its current name.

== Population ==
Historical population
Year	Pop.	±% p.a.
1968	3,102	—
1975	3,166	+0.29%
1982	3,207	+0.18%
1990	3,020	−0.75%
1999	3,113	+0.34%
2007	3,181	+0.27%
2012	2,878	−1.98%
2017	3,166	+1.93%
2023	3,344	+0.92%
Source: INSEE

== See also ==
- Castillonnais (Gironde)
- Communes of the Gironde department
