= Portrait of Marshal Saint-Arnaud =

Painting by Charles-Philippe Larivière

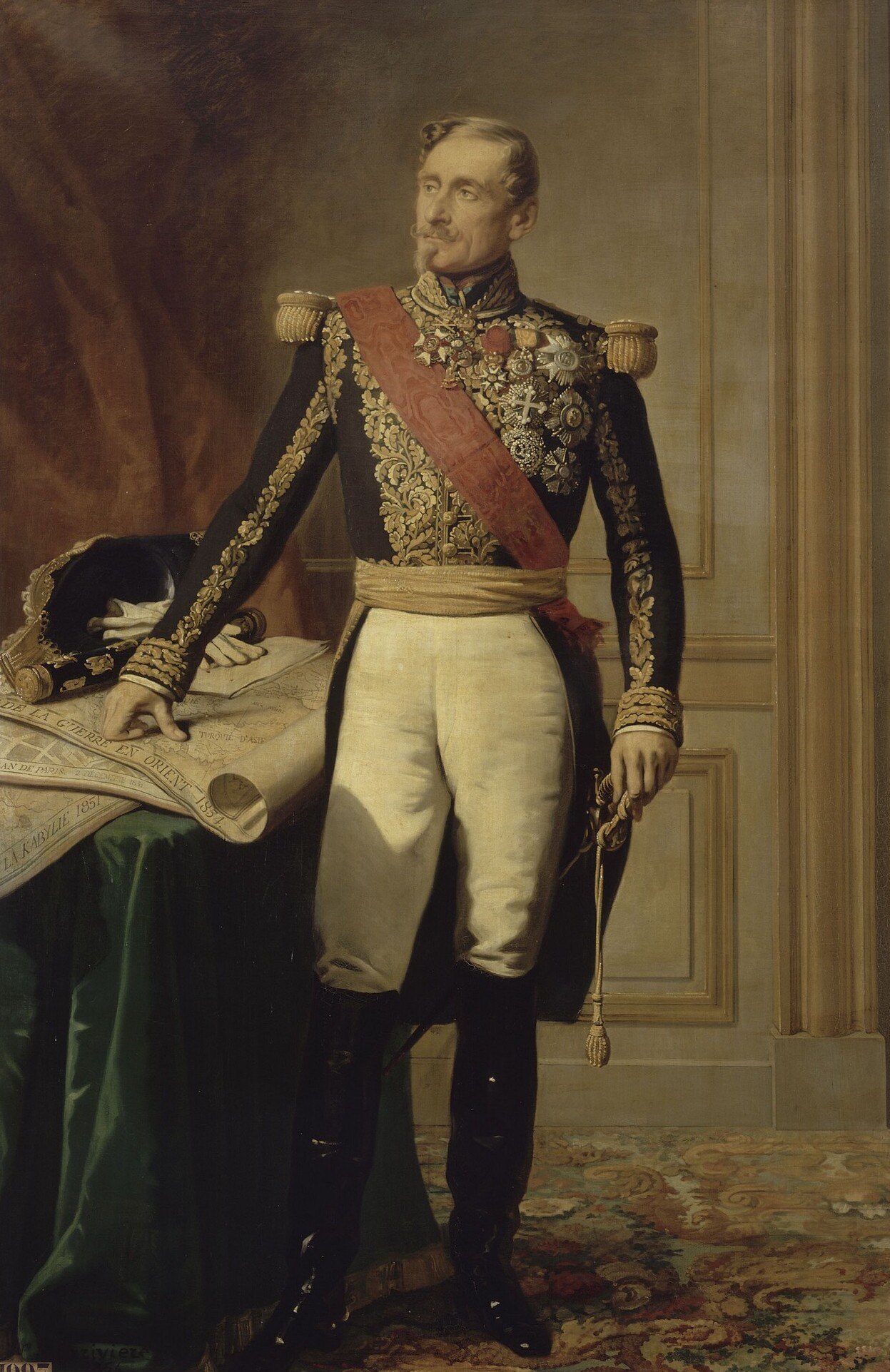
- Artist: Charles-Philippe Larivière
- Year: 1854
- Type: Oil on canvas, portrait painting
- Dimensions: 215 cm × 140 cm (85 in × 55 in)
- Location: Palace of Versailles, Versailles

Portrait of Marshal Saint-Arnaud is an 1854 portrait painting by the French artist Charles-Philippe Larivière. It depicts the French soldier Marshal Jacques Leroy de Saint-Arnaud. He is shown in full uniform and decorations pointing at a map of the Ottoman Empire.

Saint-Arnaud made his name during the French Conquest of Algeria and played a key role in the 1851 French coup d'état. He was appointed to command the French forces of the Allied army during the Crimean War. Alongside the British under Lord Raglan he was victorious at the Battle of the Alma in September 1854, but died of illness just a week later.

Napoleon III promoted the reputation of his leading military commanders to resemble those of his uncle Napoleon's Marshals of the Empire earlier in the century. They are depicted in full-length portraits commissioned by the state. The painting was displayed at the Salon of 1855 held in Paris as part of the wider Exposition Universelle. It featured again at the International Exhibition held in London in 1862. Today the painting is in the collection of the Palace of Versailles.

== See also ==
- Portrait of Marshal Canrobert, picture of his successor in the Crimea by Horace Vernet

== Bibliography ==
- Hornstein, Katie. Picturing War in France, 1792–1856. Yale University Press, 2018.
- Thoma, Julia. The Final Spectacle: Military Painting under the Second Empire, 1855-1867. Walter de Gruyter, 2019.
