= Jacques Leroy de Saint-Arnaud =

Marshal of France and Minister of War (1798–1854)

Marshal of France Jacques Leroy de Saint Arnaud
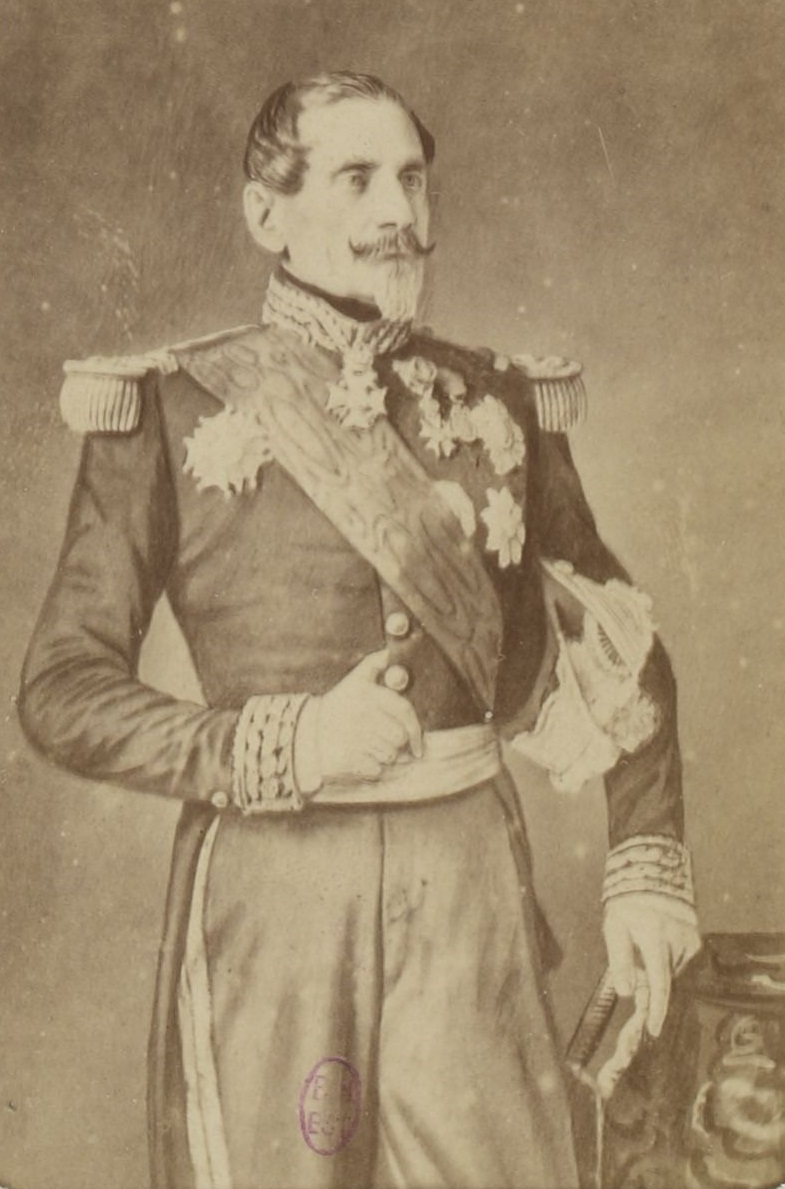
- Saint-Arnaud, by Pierre-Louis Pierson c. 1850s
- Born: 20 August 1798; Paris, France
- Died: 29 September 1854 (aged 56); Black Sea
- Burial place: Les Invalides
- Military career
- Allegiance: Bourbon Restoration; July Monarchy; French Second Republic; Second French Empire
- Branch: French Army
- Service years: 1821–1854
- Rank: Maréchal de France
- Conflicts: Conquest of Algeria; Crimean War; • Battle of the Alma; • Siege of Sevastopol
- Awards: Legion of Honour (Grand Croix)

Armand-Jacques Leroy de Saint-Arnaud (20 August 1798 – 29 September 1854) was a French soldier and Marshal of France. He served as French Minister of War until the Crimean War when he became Commander-in-chief of the army of the East.

He was a key conspirator in the 1851 French coup d'état which dissolved the National Assembly, granted dictatorial powers to Napoleon III and caused the dissolution of the French Second Republic.

== Biography ==
Born in Paris, he entered the army in 1817, but after ten years of garrison service he still held only the lowest commissioned grade. He then resigned, led a life of adventure in several lands and returned to the army at the age of thirty as a sub-lieutenant. He took part in the suppression of the Vendée émeute (1832), and served for a time on the staff of General (Marshal) Bugeaud. However, his debts and the scandals of his private life compelled him to go to Algeria as a captain in the French Foreign Legion. There he distinguished himself on numerous occasions, and after twelve years had risen to the rank of maréchal de camp (major general).

Following the example of Marshal Aimable Pélissier, Saint Arnaud suffocated 500 Arab tribesmen on 8 August 1845, in a cave between Tenes and Mostaganem, in the Sbeah area. Three days later he wrote "I hermetically sealed all exits and made a vast cemetery. The earth will cover the corpses of these fanatics for ever. No one went down to the caverns; no one but me knows that there are 500 brigands under here who will not cut the throats of the French any more. A confidential report related everything to the Marshal simply, without terrible poetry and without images. Brother, no one is good by taste and by nature like me. From the 8th to the 12th, I was sick, but my conscience does not blame me for anything. I did my duty". These massacres were regarded with absolute horror in the French press, as an article in The Times relates.

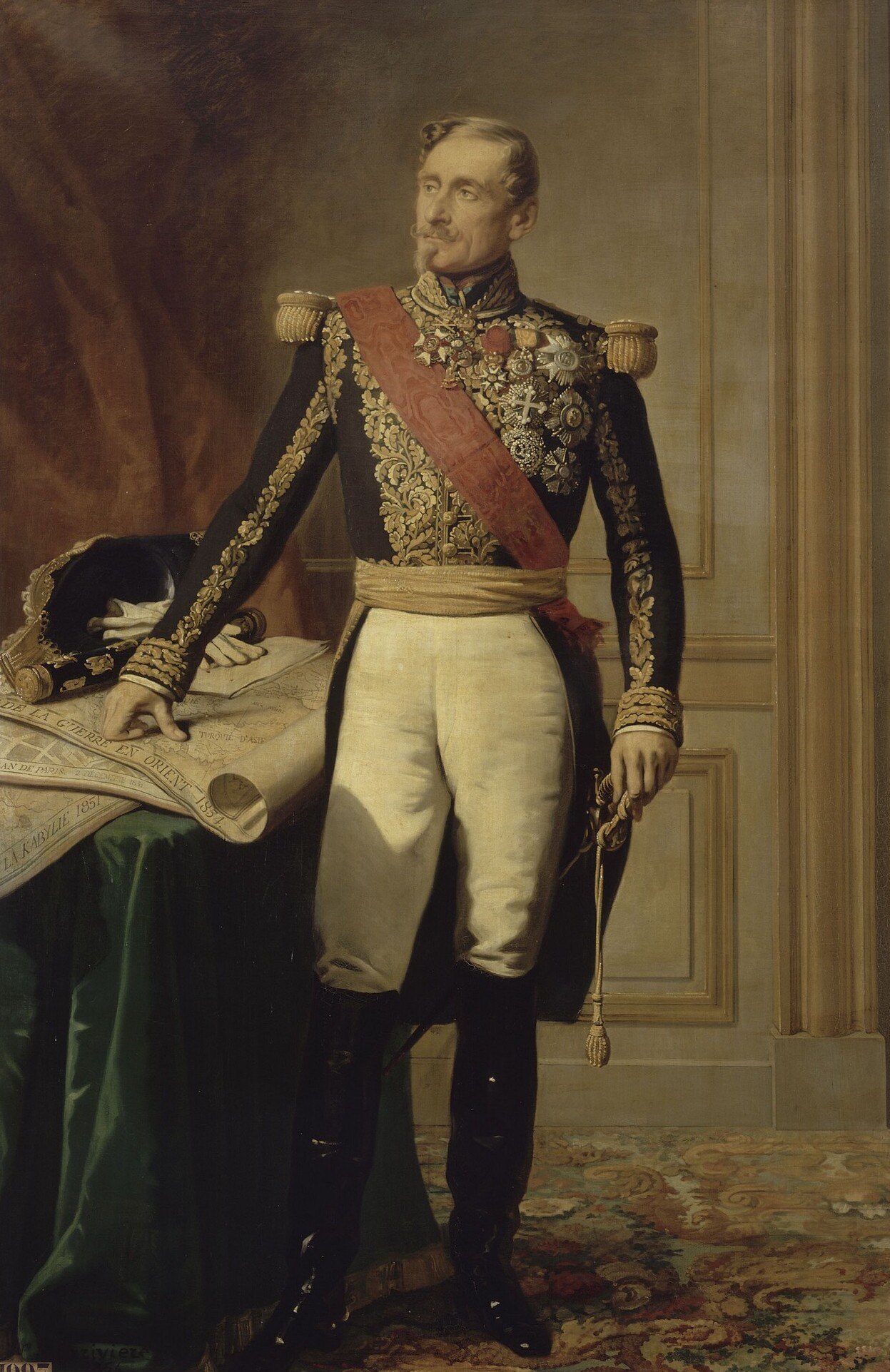
Portrait of Marshal Saint-Arnaud by Charles-Philippe Larivière, c. 1854

He also burnt 200 villages in 1846, including rich arable fields."I left in my wake a vast conflagration. All the villages, some 200 in number, were burned down, all the gardens destroyed, all the olive trees cut down."

In 1848 Saint Arnaud commanded a brigade during the revolution in Paris. On his return to Africa, possibly because Louis Napoleon considered him a suitable military head of a potential coup d'état, an expedition took place into Little Kabylie in northern Algeria, in which Saint Arnaud showed his prowess as a commander-in-chief and provided his superiors with the pretext for bringing him home as a general of division (July 1851).

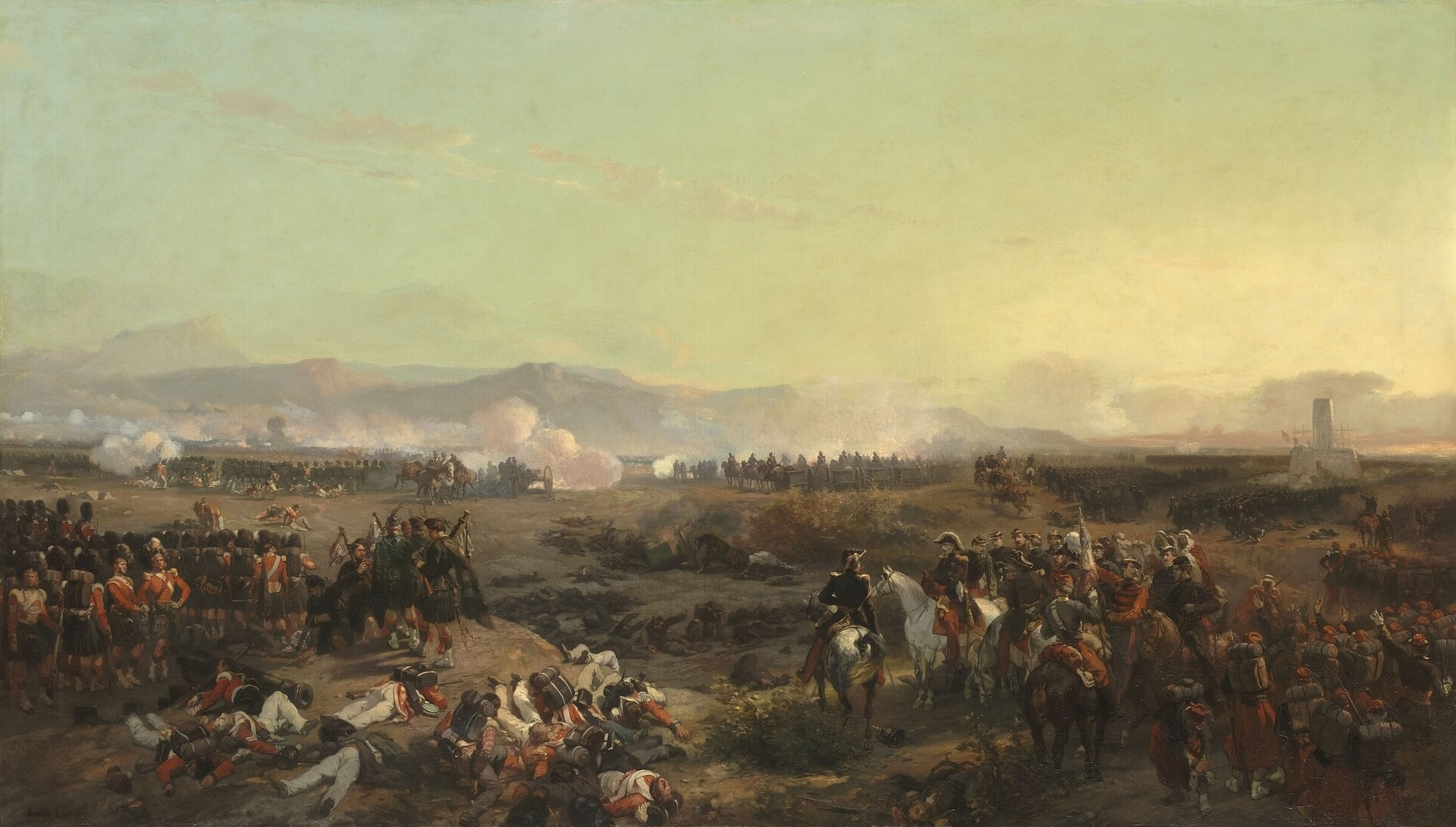
The Battle of the Alma by Eugène Lami, 1855. Saint-Arnaud is on the right with his staff.

He succeeded Marshal Magnan as minister of war and superintended the military operations of the coup d'état of 2 December 1851, which placed Louis Napoleon on the throne as Emperor Napoleon III. A year later he became a Marshal of France and a senator, remaining at the head of the war office until 1854, when he set out to command the French forces in the Crimean War, alongside his British colleague Lord Raglan. Ill with stomach cancer, he died on board ship just over a week after commanding troops at the Battle of the Alma on 20 September 1854. His body was returned to France, and lies buried in Les Invalides.

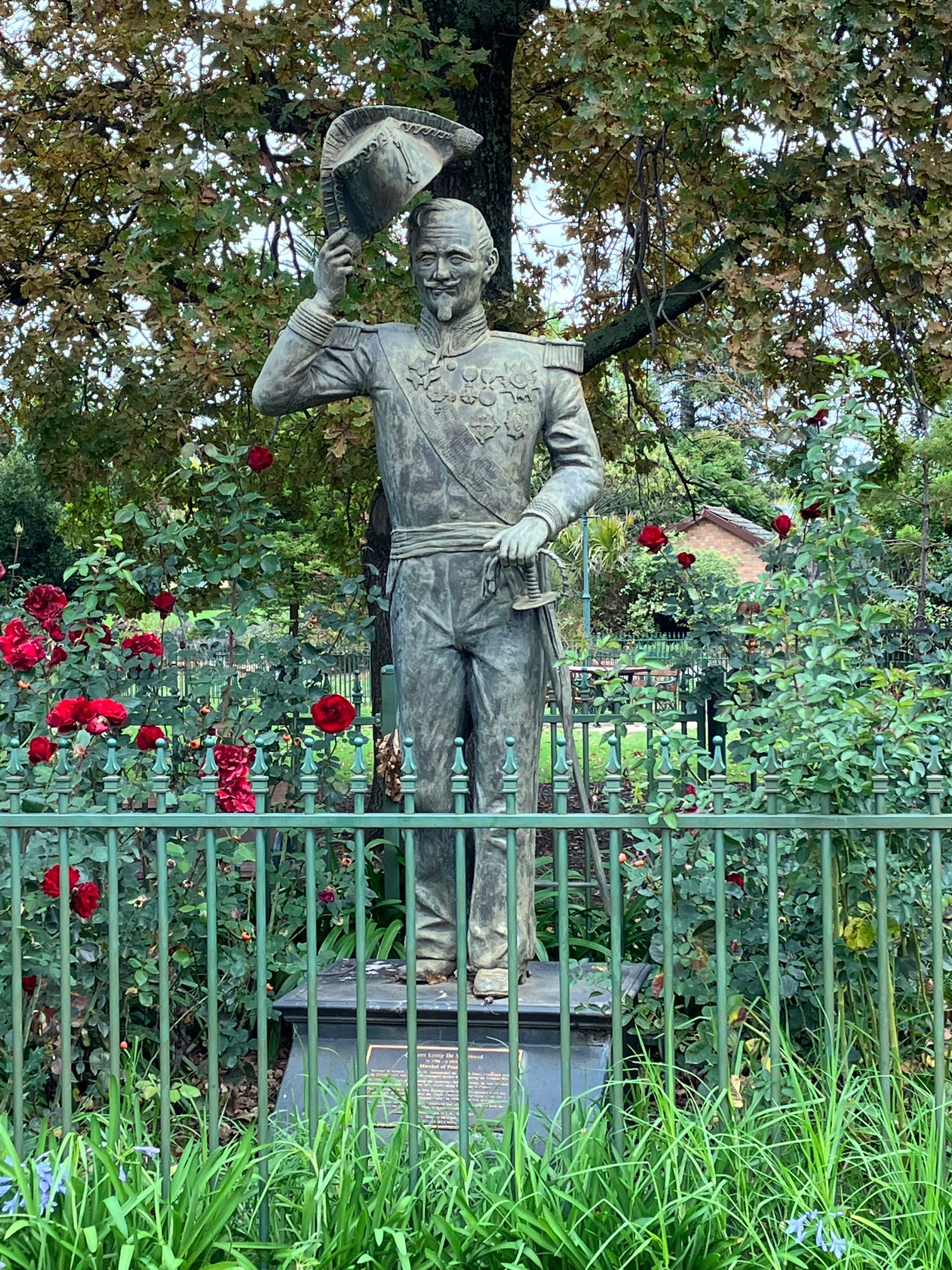
Statue of Saint-Arnaud in the Australian town of St Arnaud

After his death Saint Arnaud was regarded as a military hero, by both the French state and army. However, in Victor Hugo's long poem "Saint Arnaud", he is described as a criminal ‘jackal’ who had orchestrated the bloody massacres that followed Louis-Napoleon’s coup d’état. Algernon Charles Swinburne later described the poem of Saint Arnaud as an example of Hugo's 'poetic genius'. Swinburne said 'Then... came the great and terrible poem on the life and death of the miscreant marshal who gave the watchword of massacre in the streets of Paris'.

== Legacy ==
The town of St Arnaud, Victoria, Australia was named after Jacques and has a commemorative statue of him in the town's botanical gardens on Napier Street. Another town, located in Algeria, was called Saint Arnaud under French rule; currently, its name is El Eulma. The Saint Arnaud Range and the nearby locality of Saint Arnaud in New Zealand both derive their name from him.

== Honours ==
- Second French Empire: Baton of Maréchal de France
- Second French Empire: Grand Croix of the Legion of Honour
- Second French Empire: Médaille militaire
- Kingdom of Sardinia: Grand Croix of the Order of Saints Maurice and Lazarus
- Two Sicilies: Grand Croix of the Order of Saint George and Reunion
- Papal States: Grand Croix of the Order of Pope Pius IX
- Papal States: Grand Croix of the Order of St. Gregory the Great
- Belgium: Commander of the Order of Leopold
- Ottoman Empire: First Class of the Order of the Medjidie
- Tunisia: First Class of the Order of Glory

Preceded by Jacques Louis Randon	Minister of War, 26 October 1851 – 11 March 1854	Succeeded by Jean-Baptiste Philibert Vaillant
