= Jacques de Rougé du Plessis-Bellière =

French general

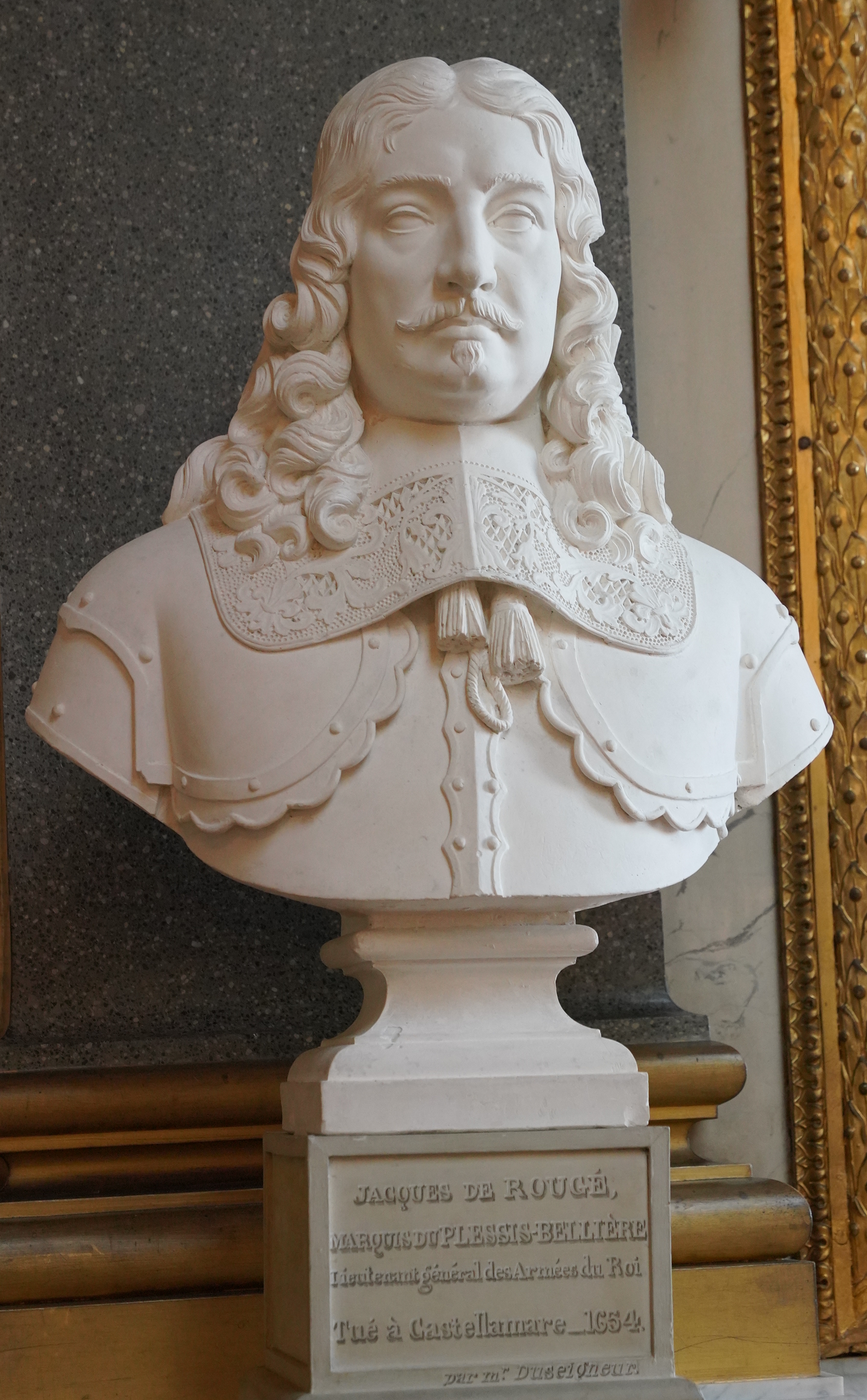
A bust of Jacques de Rougé du Plessis-Bellière in Galerie des Batailles at the Chateau de Versailles

Jacques de Rougé, marquis du Plessis-Bellière (1602–1654) was a French general. He married Suzanne de Bruc de Monplaisir.
