= Battle of Castillon =

1453 battle between France and England

- Part of the Hundred Years' War
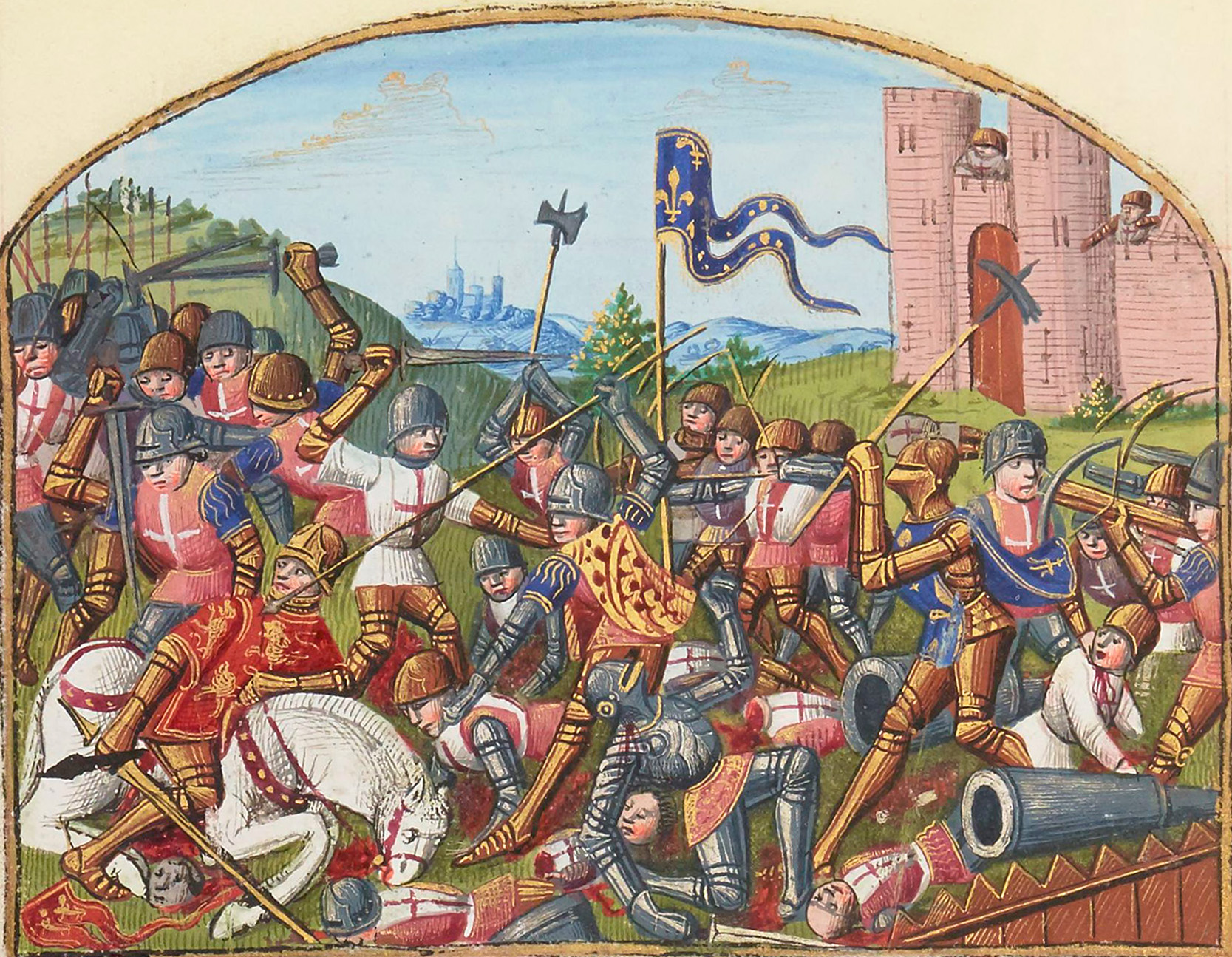
- The death of John Talbot, Earl of Shrewsbury at the battle of Castillon from Vigilles de Charles VII by Martial d'Auvergne (1484)
Date	17 July 1453
Location	Castillon-la-Bataille, Duchy of Gascony 44°51′6″N 0°1′8″W
Result	French victory: End of the Hundred Years' War

Belligerents
Kingdom of France; Duchy of Brittany	Kingdom of England; Duchy of Gascony

Commanders and leaders
Jean Bureau; Peter II; Jacques de Chabannes; Jean V de Bueil	John Talbot, Earl of Shrewsbury †; John Talbot, Viscount Lisle †; John de Foix, Earl of Kendal (POW)

Strength
7,000–9,000; 1,000 Bretons; 300 guns	5,000–10,000

Casualties and losses
100 killed or wounded	4,000 killed or captured The rest of the army surrenders the next day
- Location within current region of Nouvelle-Aquitaine, France.

The Battle of Castillon was a battle between the forces of England and France which took place on 17 July 1453 in Gascony near the town of Castillon-sur-Dordogne (later Castillon-la-Bataille). On the day of the battle, the English commander, John Talbot, 1st Earl of Shrewsbury, mistakenly believing that the enemy was retreating, led a relatively small advance force of his army in an attack on a strongly fortified French encampment without waiting for reinforcements. Talbot then refused to withdraw even after realising the strength of the French position, allowing the French artillery to destroy his reinforcements piecemeal. Castillon was the first major European battle won through the extensive use of field artillery.

The battle led to the English losing nearly all their holdings in France, especially Gascony, which had been a possession of the Plantagenet kings for the previous three centuries. Political instability ensued in England.

== Background ==
The breakdown of the 1420 Treaty of Troyes began the final stage of the Hundred Years' War. This period from 1420 to 1453 is characterised by Anne Curry as the "wars of the Treaty of Troyes" for control of the crown of France.

After the 1451 French capture of Bordeaux by the armies of Charles VII, the Hundred Years' War appeared to be at an end. The English primarily focused on reinforcing their only remaining possession, Calais, and watching over the seas. After three hundred years of Plantagenet rule, though, the citizens of Bordeaux considered themselves as subjects of the English monarch and sent messengers to Henry VI of England demanding that he recapture the province.

On 17 October 1452, John Talbot, the Earl of Shrewsbury landed near Bordeaux with a force of 3,000 men. A feared and famous military leader, Talbot was rumoured to be seventy-five or eighty years old, but it is more likely that he was around sixty-six at the time. With the cooperation of the townspeople, Talbot easily took the city on 23 October. The English subsequently took control over most of western Gascony by the end of the year. The French had known an English expedition was coming, but had expected it to come through Normandy. After this surprise, Charles prepared his forces over the winter, and by early 1453 he was ready to counterattack.

== Prelude ==
Charles invaded Guyenne with three separate armies, all headed for Bordeaux. Talbot received the reinforcement of 3,000 additional men, led by his fourth and favourite son, John, the Viscount Lisle. The French laid siege to Castillon (approximately 40 kilometres (25 mi) east of Bordeaux) on 8 July. Talbot acceded to the pleas of the town leaders, abandoning his original plan to wait at Bordeaux for more reinforcements, and set out to relieve the garrison.

The French army was commanded by committee; Charles VII's ordnance officer Jean Bureau laid out the camp to maximise French artillery strength. In a defensive setup, Bureau's forces built an artillery park out of range from Castillon's guns. According to Desmond Seward, the park "consisted of a deep trench with a wall of earth behind it which was strengthened by tree-trunks; its most remarkable feature was the irregular, wavy line of the ditch and earthwork, which enabled the guns to enfilade any attackers". The park included up to 300 guns of various sizes, and was protected by a ditch and palisade on three sides and a steep bank of the River Lidoire on the fourth.

Talbot left Bordeaux on 16 July. He outdistanced a majority of his forces, arriving at Libourne by sunset with only 500 men-at-arms and 800 mounted archers. The following day, this force defeated a small French detachment of archers stationed at a priory near Castillon. Despite earlier plans to wait for reinforcements, Talbot pressed his men onward to the French camp, believing the rest of his men would arrive soon.

== Battle ==
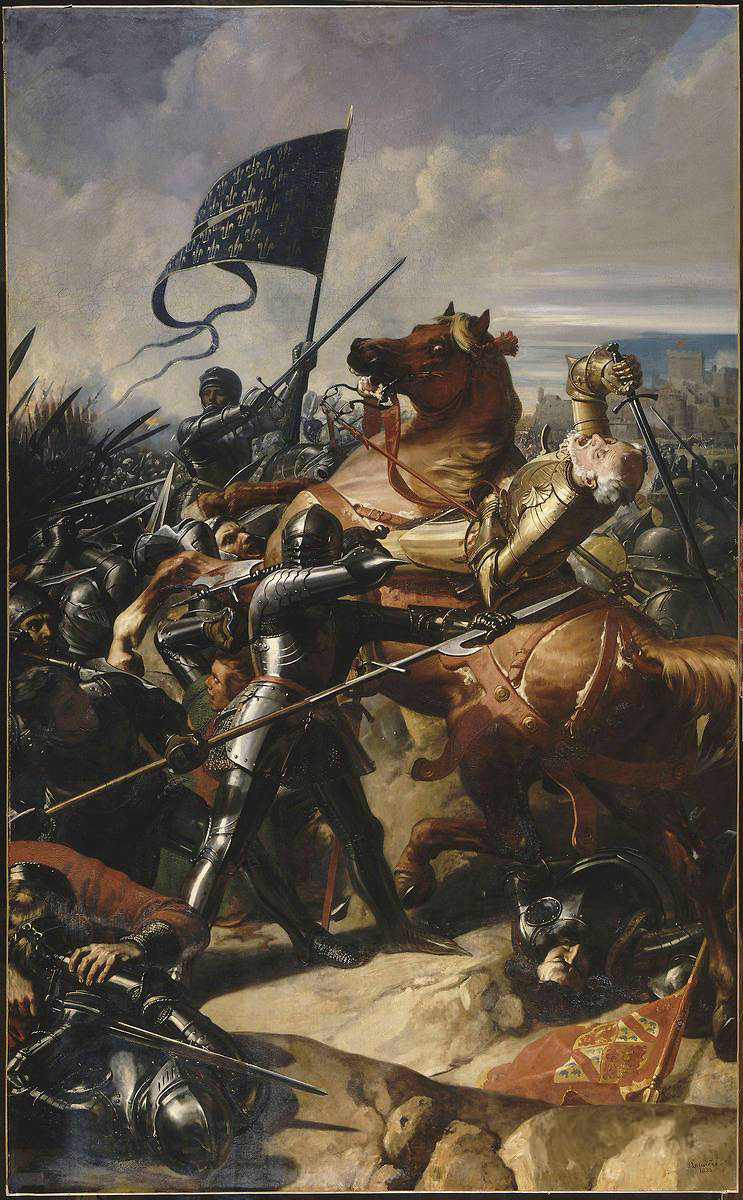
1839 painting The Battle of Castillon by the French painter Charles-Philippe Larivière (1798–1876). (Galerie des Batailles, Palace of Versailles). John Talbot at right is falling from his wounded horse, leading to his death

Along with the morale boost of victory at the priory, Talbot also pushed forward because of reports that the French were retreating. However, the cloud of dust leaving the camp which the townsmen indicated as a retreat was in fact created by camp followers departing before the battle.

The English advanced but soon ran into the full force of the French army. Despite being outnumbered and in a vulnerable position, Talbot ordered his men to continue fighting. Historian A. J. Pollard suggests this seemingly reckless behaviour from Talbot may be due to the fact that his "pride and honour were at stake for he had already ordered his men to battle when he discovered the strength of the French position". The only Englishman who remained mounted in the battle, he also did not wear armour due to previous agreements with the French when he was released from captivity in Normandy.

According to David Nicolle, the battle itself was "highly characteristic of the period" with the strong field fortification of the French and the small-arms fighting of the battle. In many ways, this battle played out like the Battle of Crécy in "reverse". The French guns obliterated the advancing soldiers, with each shot reportedly killing six men at a time. Talbot's reinforcements continued to arrive at the battle, only to suffer the same fate in their turn. Despite the odds against the English, the battle lasted over an hour until a thousand-strong Breton cavalry force led by Peter II, Duke of Brittany, crashed into their right flank, sending them into retreat.

The battle ended in an English rout, and both Talbot and his son were killed. There is some debate over the circumstances of Talbot's death, but it appears that his horse was killed by a cannon shot, and – its mass pinning him down – a French archer in turn killed him with an axe.

The survivors of the clash as well as the remnant of the Anglo-Gascon force which had not been thrown into the battle, including John de Foix, 1st Earl of Kendal, sought refuge in the castle of Castillon.

== Aftermath ==
The day after the battle, Jean Bureau continued attacking the castle with his artillery, and the English defenders surrendered on 19 July, becoming prisoners of war.

With Talbot's death and the destruction of his army, English authority in Gascony eroded and the French retook Bordeaux on 19 October. It was not apparent to either side that the period of conflict was over. In hindsight, the battle marks a decisive turning point in history, and is cited as the endpoint of the period known as the Hundred Years' War. This was a major European battle won through the extensive use of field artillery.

Henry VI of England lost his mental capacity in late 1453, which led to the outbreak of the Wars of the Roses in England. Some have speculated that learning of the defeat at Castillon led to his mental collapse. The English Crown lost all its continental possessions except for the Pale of Calais, which was the last English possession in mainland France, and the Channel Islands, historically part of the Duchy of Normandy and thus of the Kingdom of France. Calais was lost in 1558. The Channel Islands have remained British Crown Dependencies to the present day, though they were subject to German occupation during World War II.

A casualty after the battle of Castillon was Pierre II de Montferrand, husband of Mary Plantagenet, illegitimate daughter of the Duke of Bedford and a granddaughter of Henry IV of England. While returning to France after being exiled in England, Montferrand was arrested and taken to Poitiers where he was tried by a commission. Having been found guilty he was beheaded and quartered, possibly on the orders of Charles VII, at Poitiers, on 31 July 1454. Montferrand was one of only a few nobles known to have been executed for treason during the reign of Charles VII.

== Location of the battlefield ==
There are two conflicting hypotheses concerning the location of the French camp.

The first hypothesis, based on the writings of Léo Drouyn, asserts that Jean Bureau chose a site north of the Dordogne River to position his cannons. According to his deductions, the camp was set up behind an old winding bed of the Lidoire, a small tributary of the Dordogne. The riverbed served as a ditch, and its northern bank was fortified with a parapet and a continuous wall made of tree trunks. The entrenched camp, stretching 600 metres in length, was guarded to the north, about 1.5 km away, by 1,000 Breton cavalrymen under the command of Lords Jean de Montauban and Gilles de la Hunaudaye. The Colle plain, located in the present-day commune of Lamothe-Montravel between the entrenched camp and the Dordogne, provided ideal flat terrain for the French artillery to fire.

According to a second, more recent hypothesis, based on the discovery of new sources from the Saint Florent priory and an investigation conducted by Judge Lassime in the 18th century, the French camp was located in front of the town of Castillon, within cannon range—approximately 200 metres away. Because the Lidoire shifted its course after 1496, Léo Drouyn's hypothesis would be rendered invalid.
