= Charles Lepeintre =

French painter

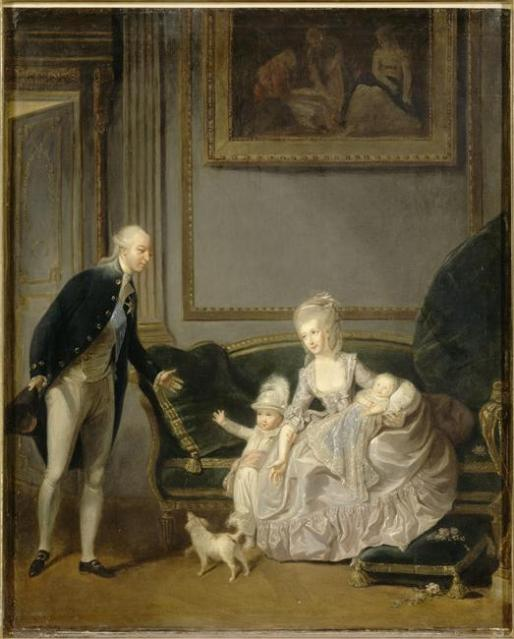
Charles Lepeintre, The future Philippe Égalité with his wife and son at the Palais Royal, 1774

Charles Lepeintre (1735–1803) was a French painter. His grandson was the painter Charles-Philippe Larivière.
