= Charles-Philippe Larivière =

French painter

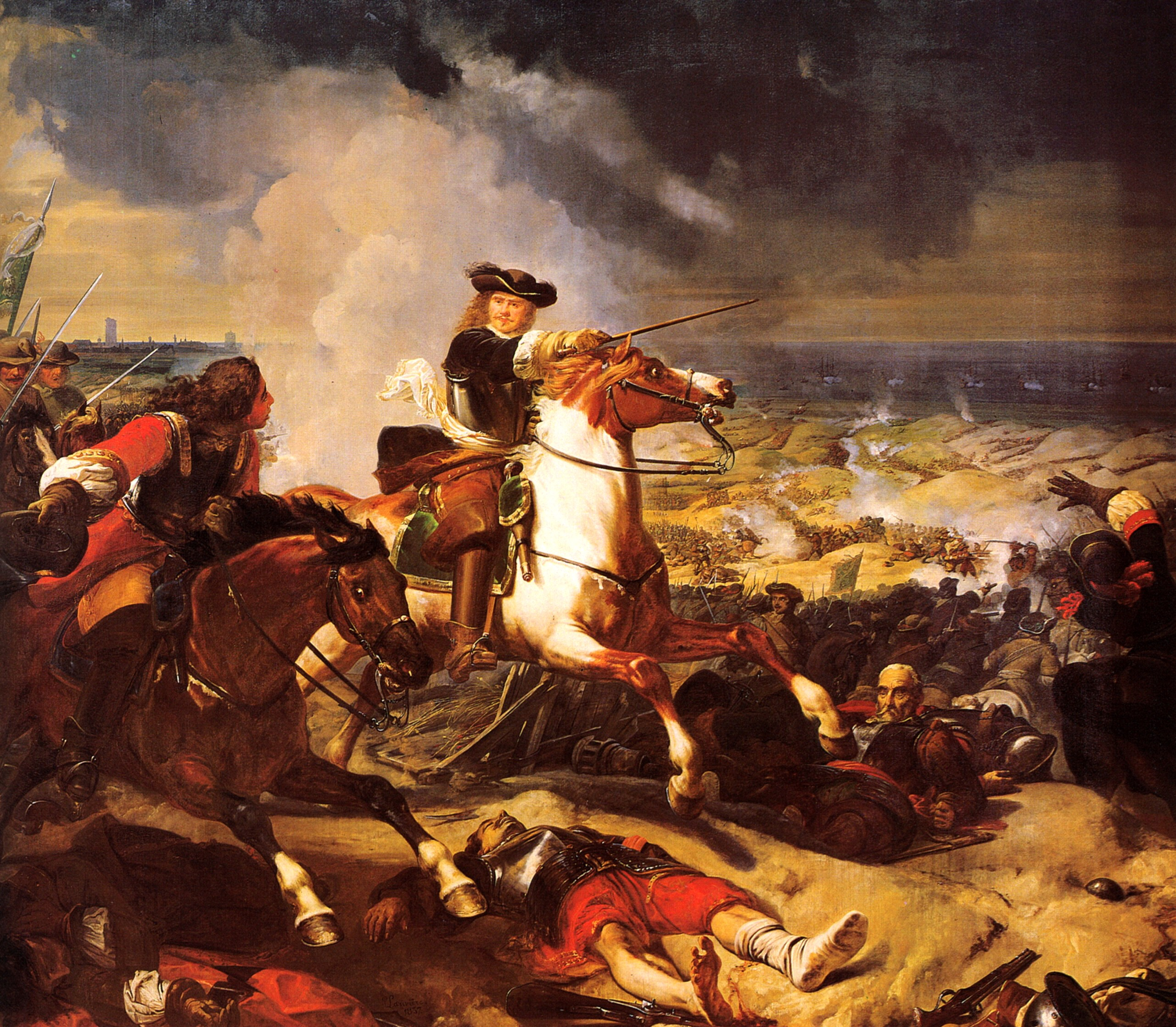
The Battle of the Dunes by Charles Philippe Larivière, Galerie des batailles, château de Versailles.

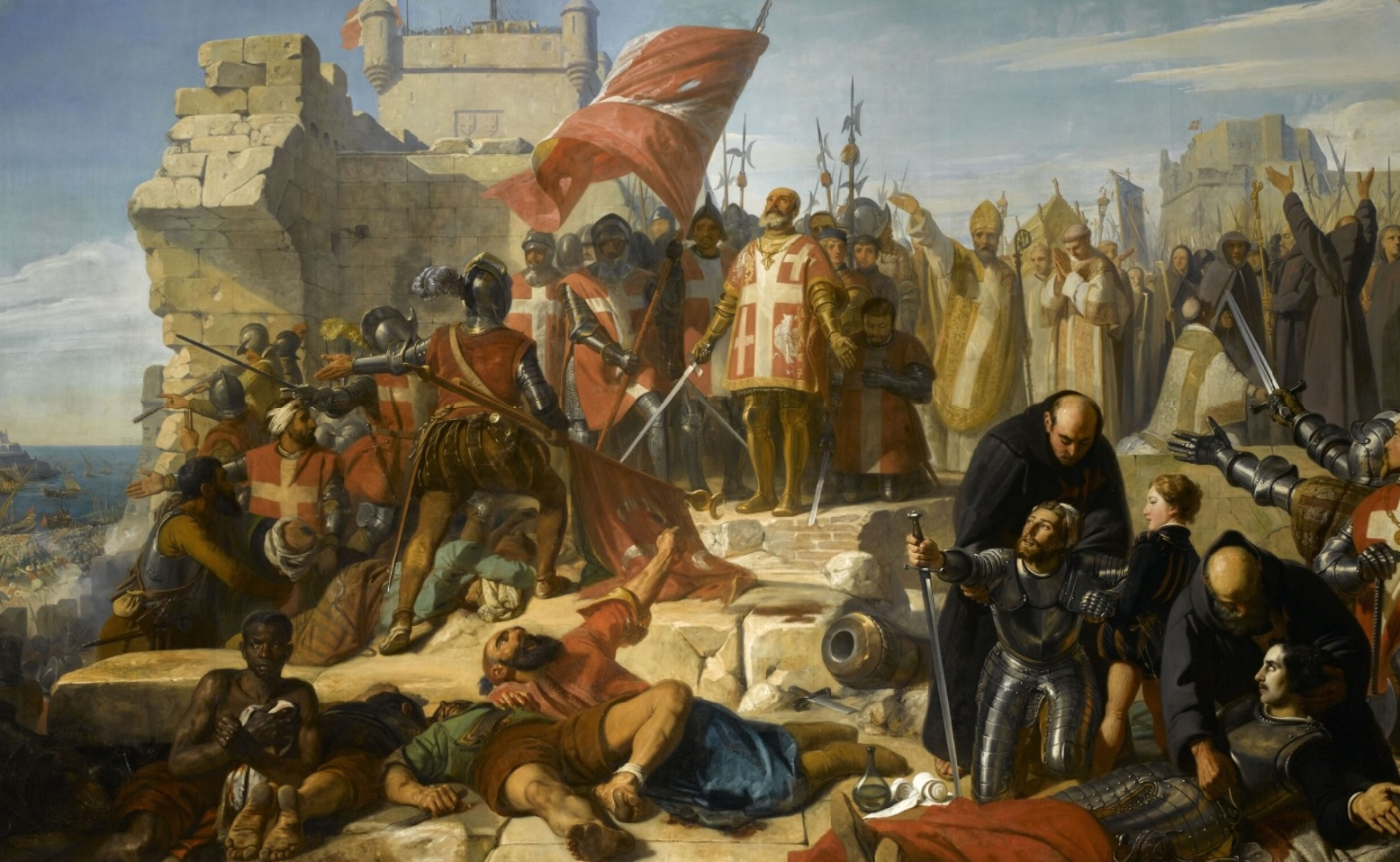
Levée du Siège de Malte by Charles-Philippe Larivière (1798–1876). Salle des Croisades, Versailles.

Charles-Philippe Larivière (28 September 1798 – 29 February 1876) was a French academic painter and lithographer.

== Biography ==
He was born in Paris. A talented student of Paulin Guérin, Girodet-Trioson and Antoine-Jean Gros, he was admitted to the école des Beaux-Arts in 1813 and won second prize in the Prix de Rome in 1819 then a médaille d'encouragement in 1820. In 1824, he won first prize in the Prix de Rome with a painting of The Death of Alcibiades, thus allowing him to stay in Rome at the Villa Medici from 1824 to 1830.

Receptive to the sensibilities of the Romantic school but formed within the discipline of classicism, he became an official artist specialising in history paintings of public events and battles of the Ancien Régime (such as the Battle of the Dunes) and the medieval period (such as Montgisard and Castillon). However, he also produced portraits of public figures and religious works. He first exhibited at the Paris Salon of 1827 and won a medal in 1831 and 1855. He benefitted from important public commissions (such as 3 paintings in the Galerie des batailles at the château de Versailles) and received the Légion d'honneur in 1836. He was also awarded the Tunisian Nichan Iftikhar.

Among the portraits of historic figures which he assigned to the paintings collection at the Musée d'Histoire de France at Versailles are those of marshals Rochambeau, Bugeaud and Saint-Arnaud. His standing portrait of général Dode de La Brunerie hung on the escalier d'honneur of the Pavillon du Roi, at the Château de Vincennes.

He also decorated a chapel dedicated to Saint-Eustache and, like Ingres, produced cartoons for stained glass windows for the Chapelle royale de Dreux. Larivière died in 1876 in Paris. On his death, his family left what was left in his studio for the musée de Picardie. The last painting by Larivière to enter a French public collection was Le Tasse convalescent au couvent de Saint-Onufre, acquired in 2001 by the Museum of Grenoble.

== Family ==
Charles-Philippe Larivière was the grandson of the painter Charles Lepeintre and uncle by marriage to the painter Albert Maignan.

His brother Louis-Eugène Larivière (c1801–1823) was also a painter. Albert Maignan left the Louvre a portrait by Louis-Eugene of Eugénie-Paméla Larivière (c 1804–1824), sister to Charles-Philippe and Louis-Eugène.

== Gallery ==
=== Versailles ===
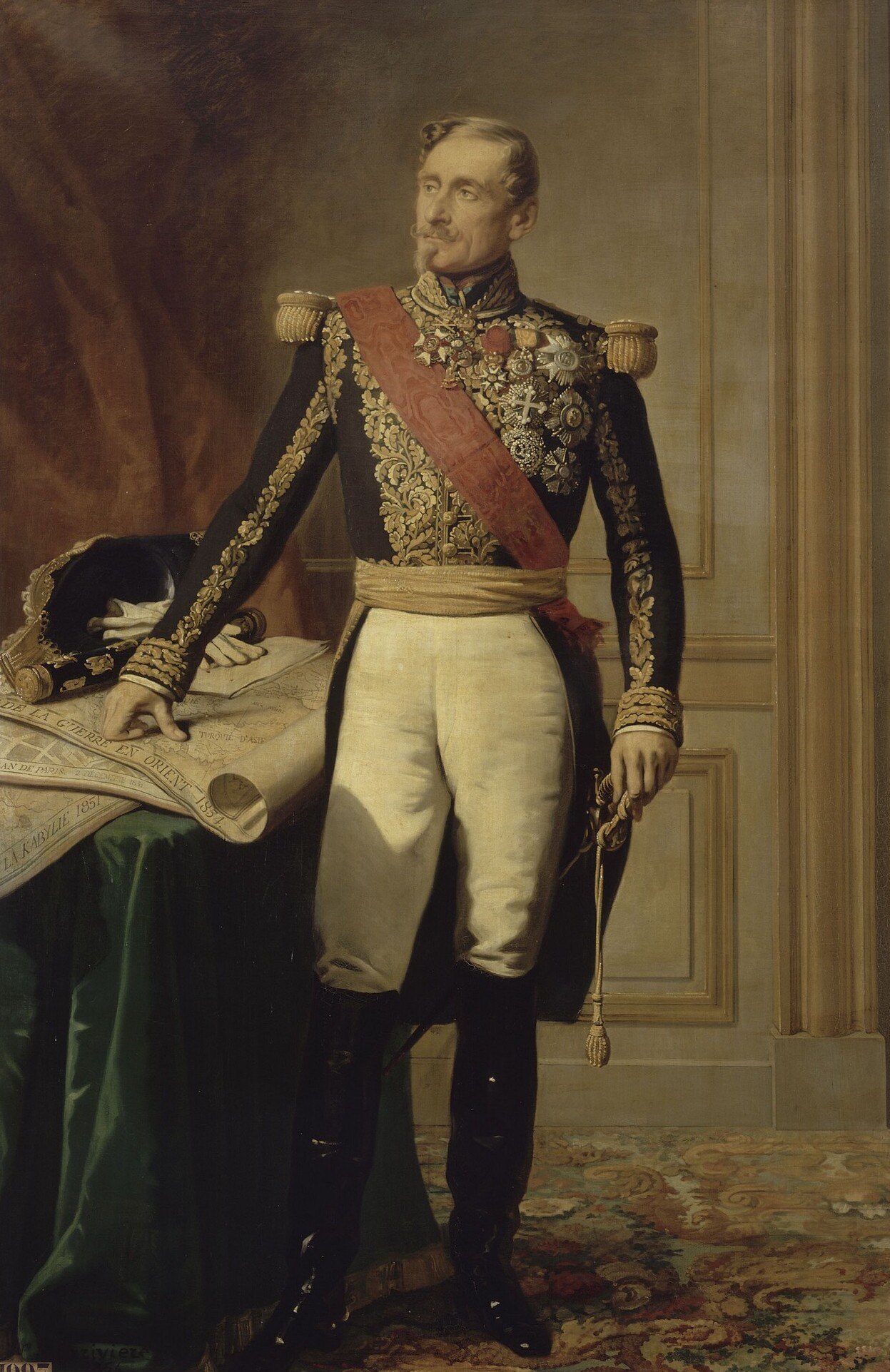
Portrait of Marshal Saint-Arnaud, 1854

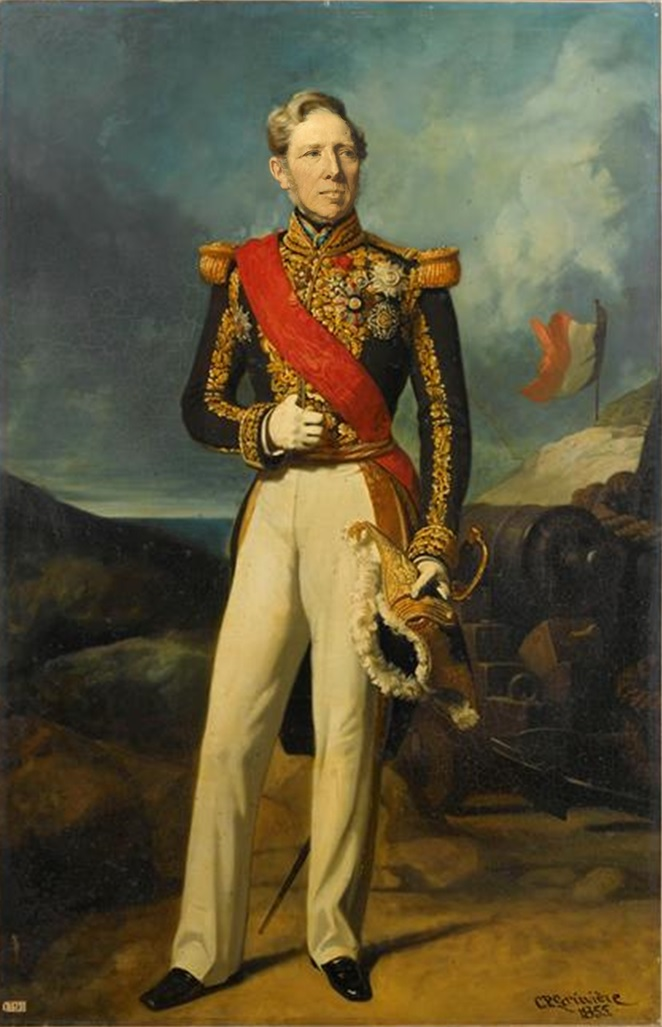
Alexandre Ferdinand Parseval-Deschenes (1790–1860)

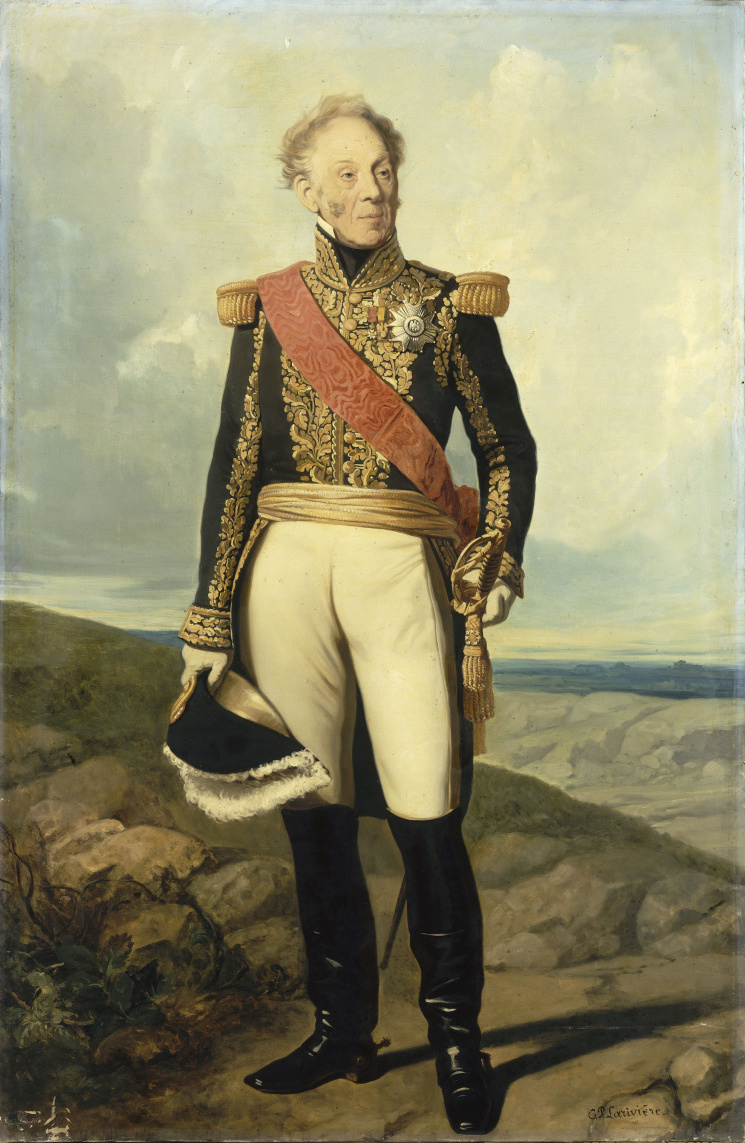
Rémy-Isidore Exelmans (1775–1852)

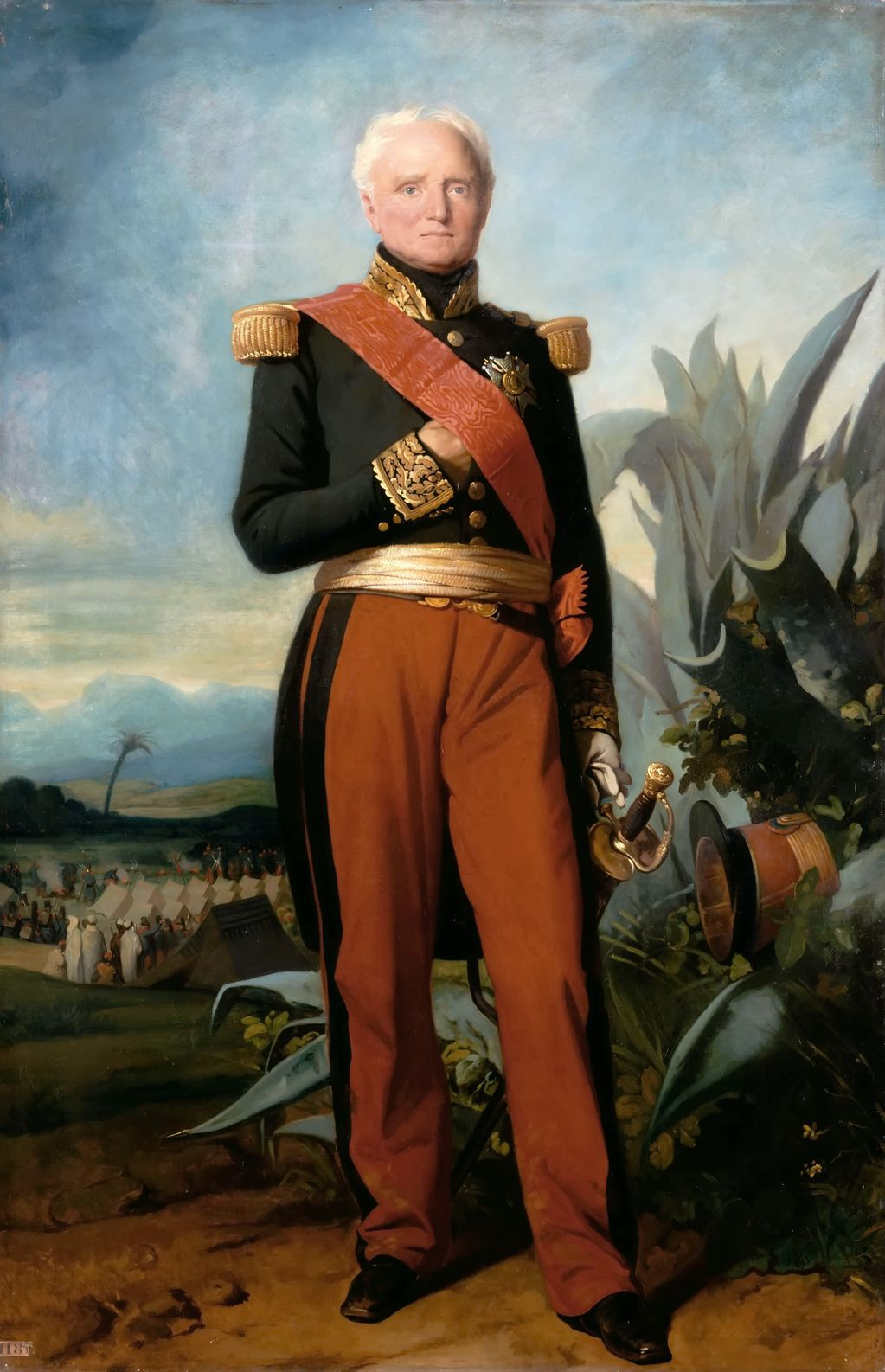
Thomas Bugeaud (1784–1849)

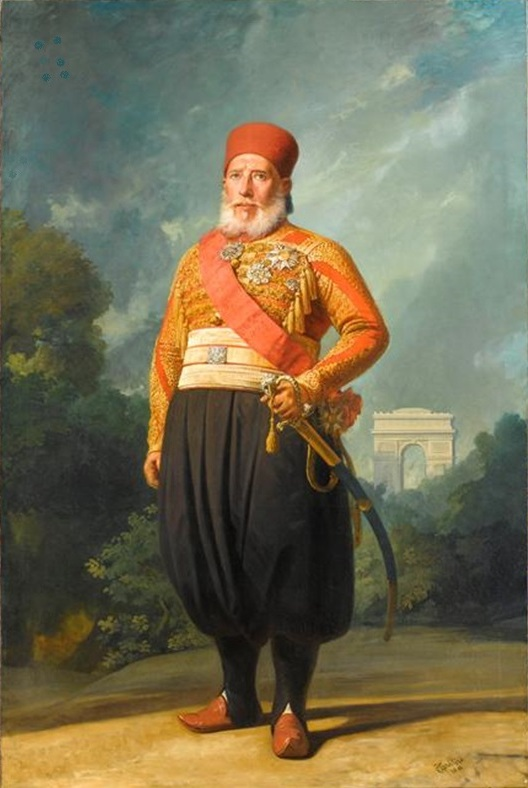
Ibrahim Pacha (1789–1848)

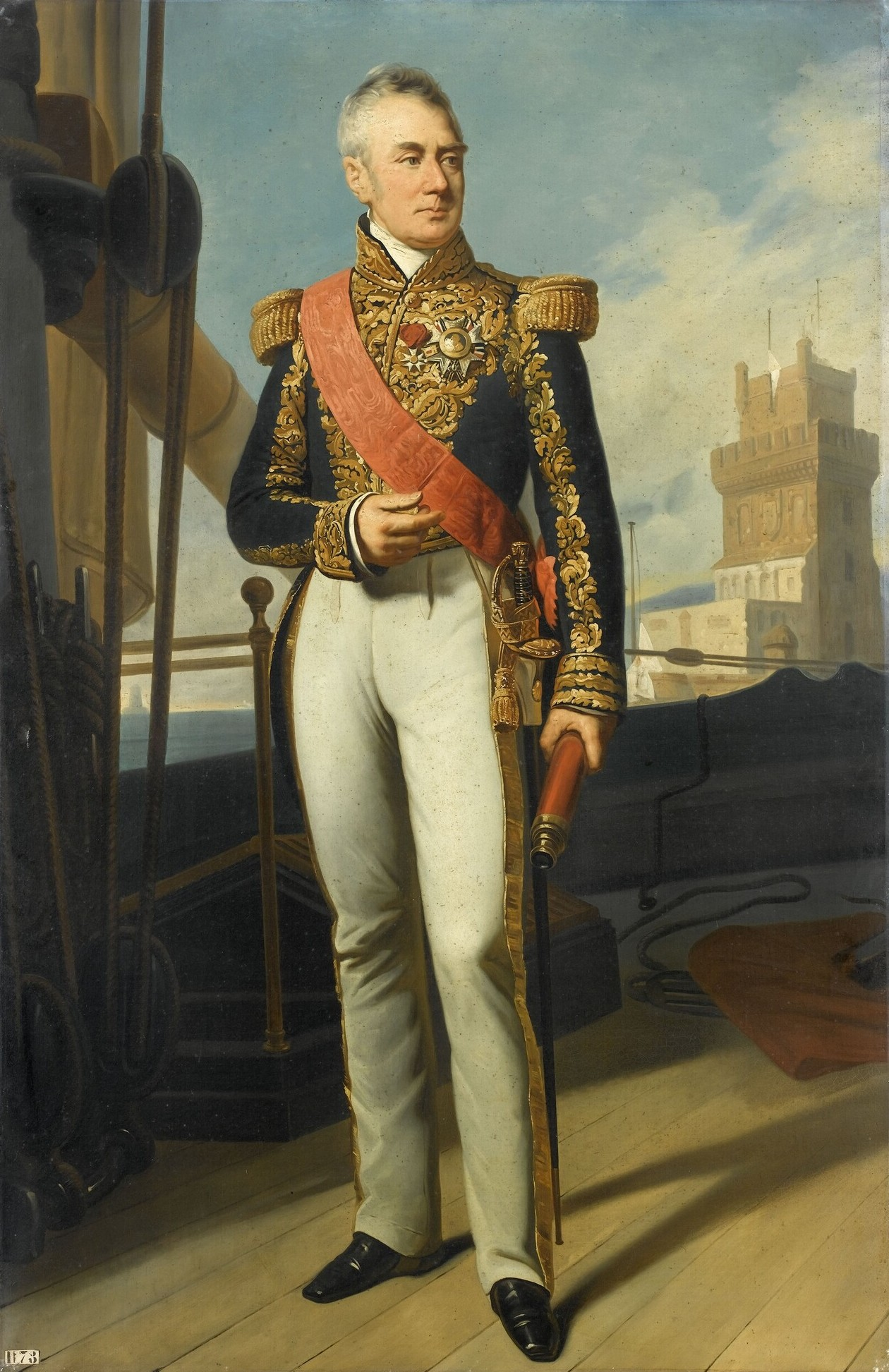
Albin Roussin (1781–1854)

=== Other ===
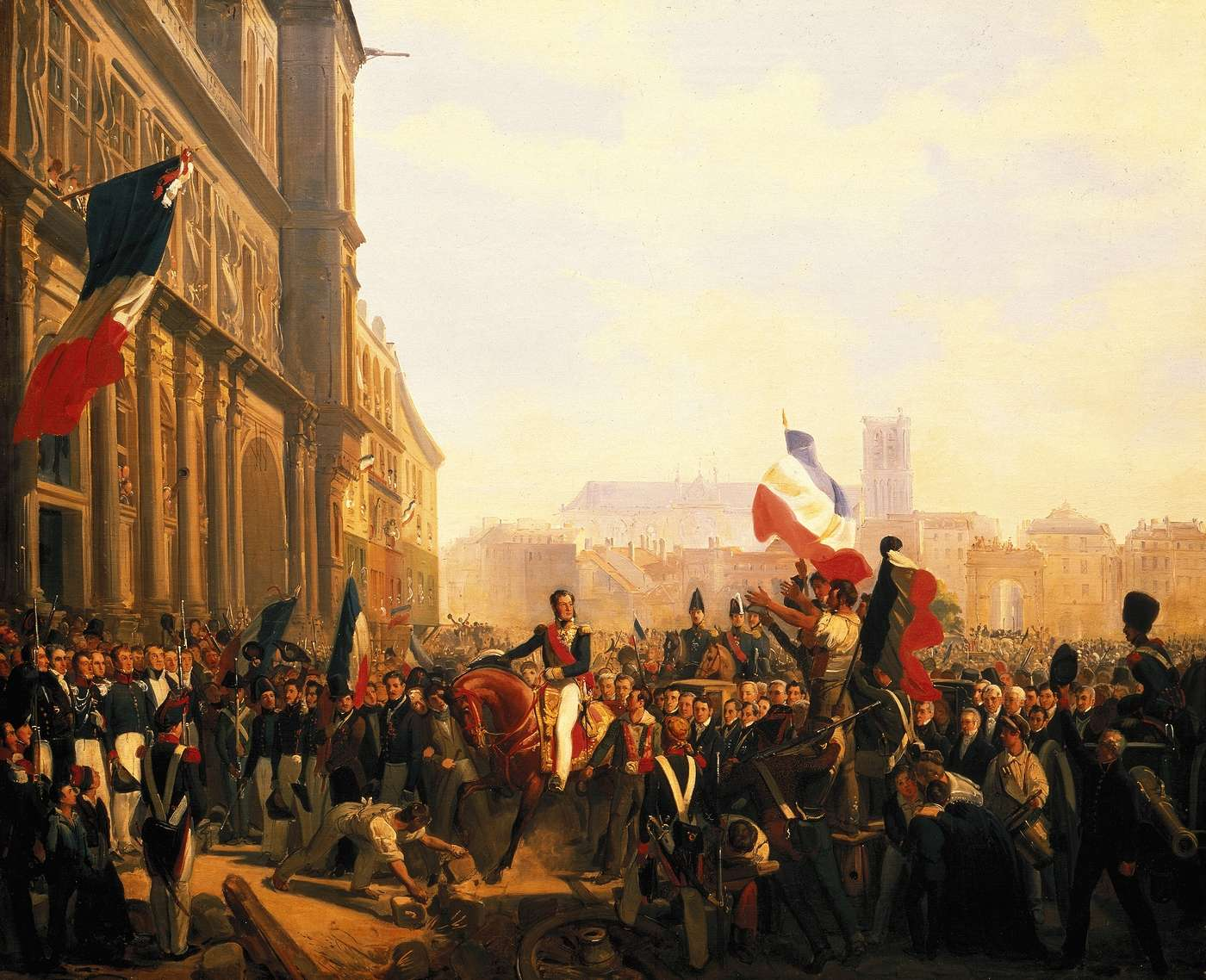
The Arrival of the Duke of Orleans at the Hôtel de Ville (1836)

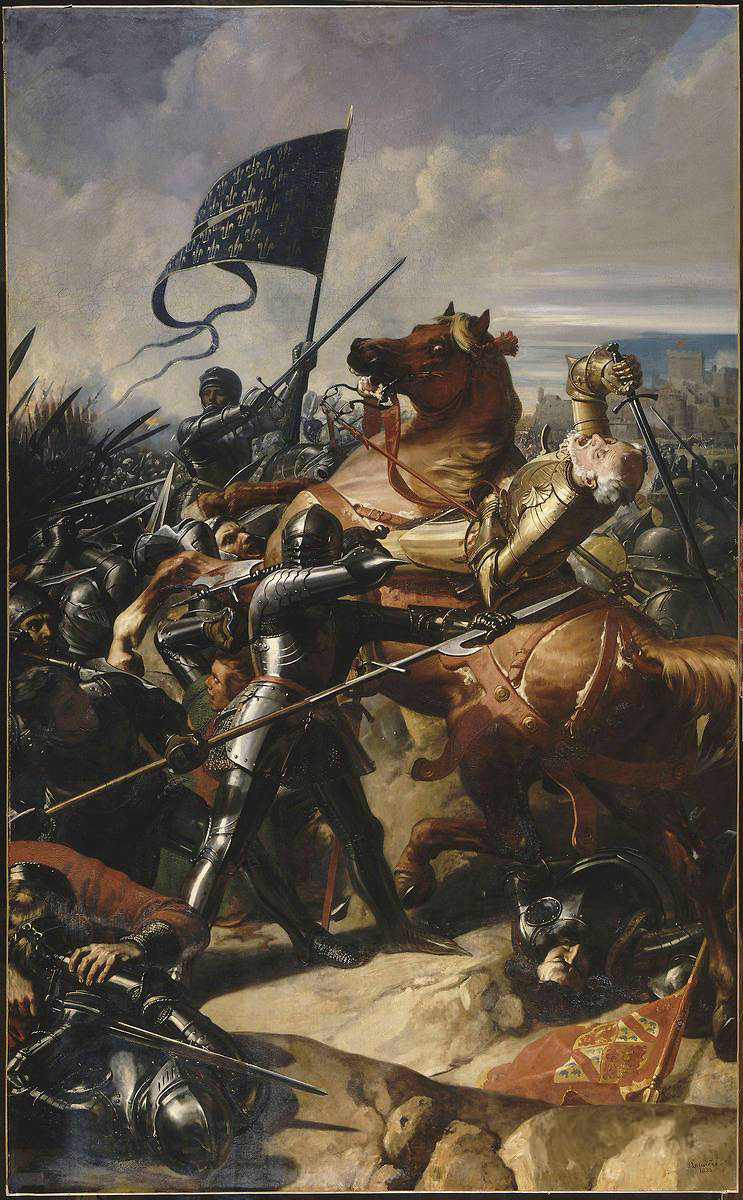
The Battle of Castillon (1839)
