= Jean-François-Théodore Gechter =

French sculptor

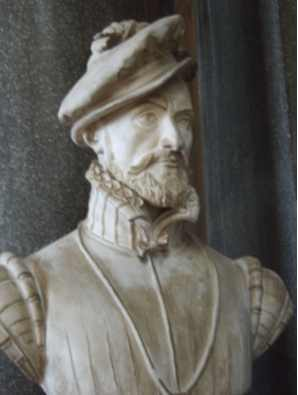
Jacques d'Albon, seigneur de Saint-André by Jean-François-Théodore Gechter; Galerie des batailles du château de Versailles

Jean-François-Théodore Gechter (1795, Paris - 1844, Paris) was a French sculptor. A student of François Joseph Bosio and baron Gros, he is now most noted for his bronzes. He first exhibited in 1824, in a show of classical and mythological subjects. From 1830 he shifted to smaller sculptures and animal subjects, like Antoine-Louis Barye, another student of Bosio and Gros. He also had a talent for historical scenes with figures in elaborate costumes.

Gechter's penchant and gift in depicting historical scenes reached new heights when in 1833 he exhibited his Combat of Charles Martel and Abderame, King of the Saracens. The bronze work was commissioned by the ministry of commerce and industry. Gechter's motif of dressing his subjects in elaborate dresses and depicting scenes of battles or hunts from the Renaissance could be considered as belonging to the genre known as troubadour. But the uniqueness of Gechter was that he managed to infuse emotions into the genre. Examples of this are Death of Tancred (1827) and Wounded Amazon (1840). This exceptional ability resulted in numerous public commissions. He created a marble relief of the Battle of Austerlitz (1833–6) for the Arc de Triomphe and a marble statue of Louis Philippe, which was commissioned in 1839.

== Major works ==
- Battle between Charles Martel and Abd er Rahman, King of the Saracens, 1849 : completed by Nicolas-Germain Charpentier
- The death of Tancred, 1837
- Battle between Charles Martel and Abd er Rahman, King of the Saracens, 1833 : with Jean-Honoré Gonon - commissioned by the French Ministry of Commerce.
- Fontaine Rhin-Rhône, Place de la Concorde (Paris), 1835-1840
- Statue of Joan of Arc, Château de Chinon
- Bas relief of the Battle of Austerlitz, on the Arc de Triomphe, place de l'Étoile (Paris), 1833 - 1836
- Francis I of France hunting, Musée de Girodet (Montargis), 1843
- Wounded Amazon, bronze, 1840
- Statue of saint Joan, marble, église de la Madeleine, Paris, 1840
- Statue of Louis-Philippe I, marble, château de Versailles, 1839
- Bust of Jacques d'Albon, seigneur de Saint-André; Galerie des batailles at the château de Versailles
- L'Engagement, 1839

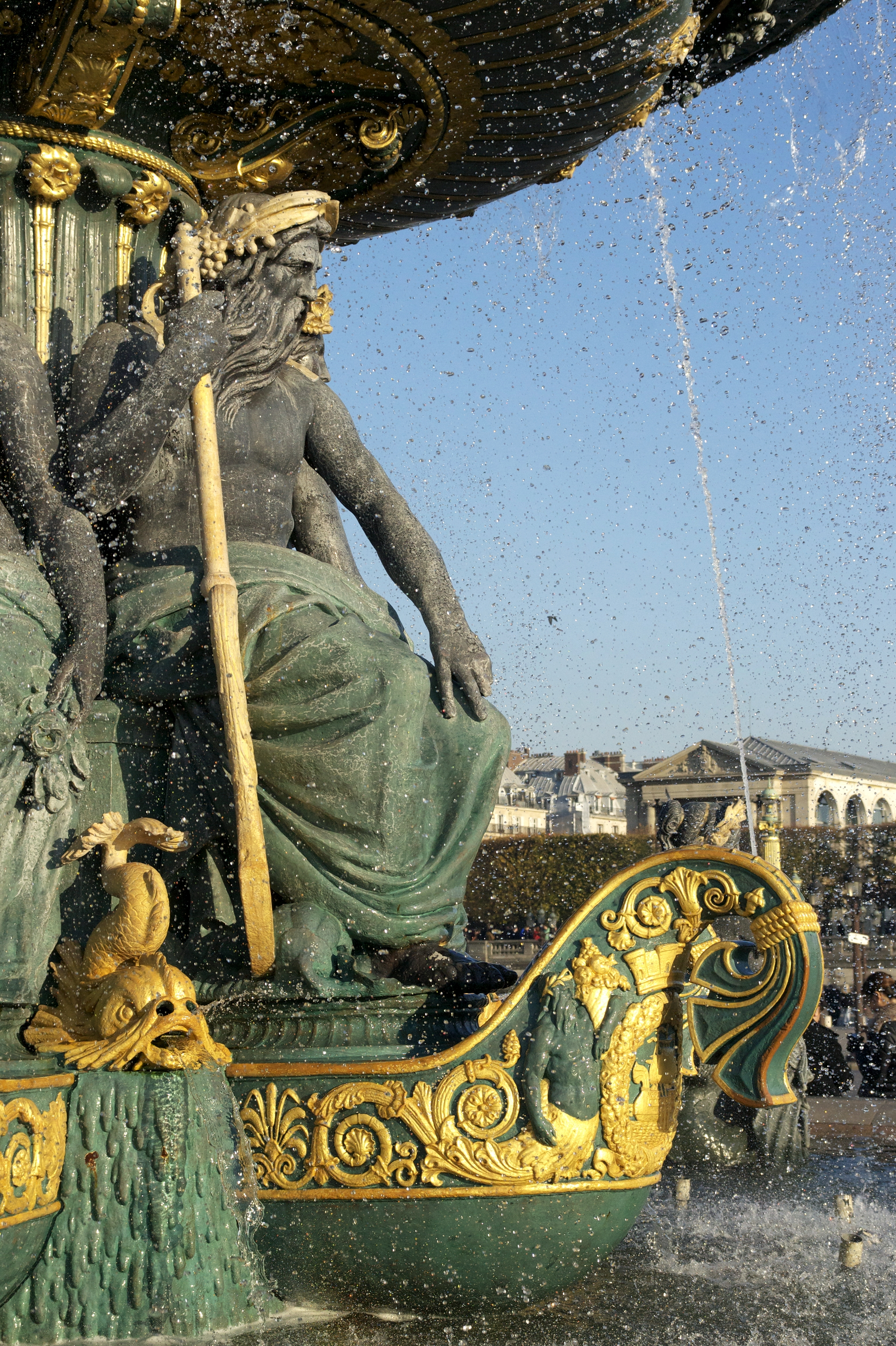
Fountain of the Rivers, Place de la Concorde, Paris.

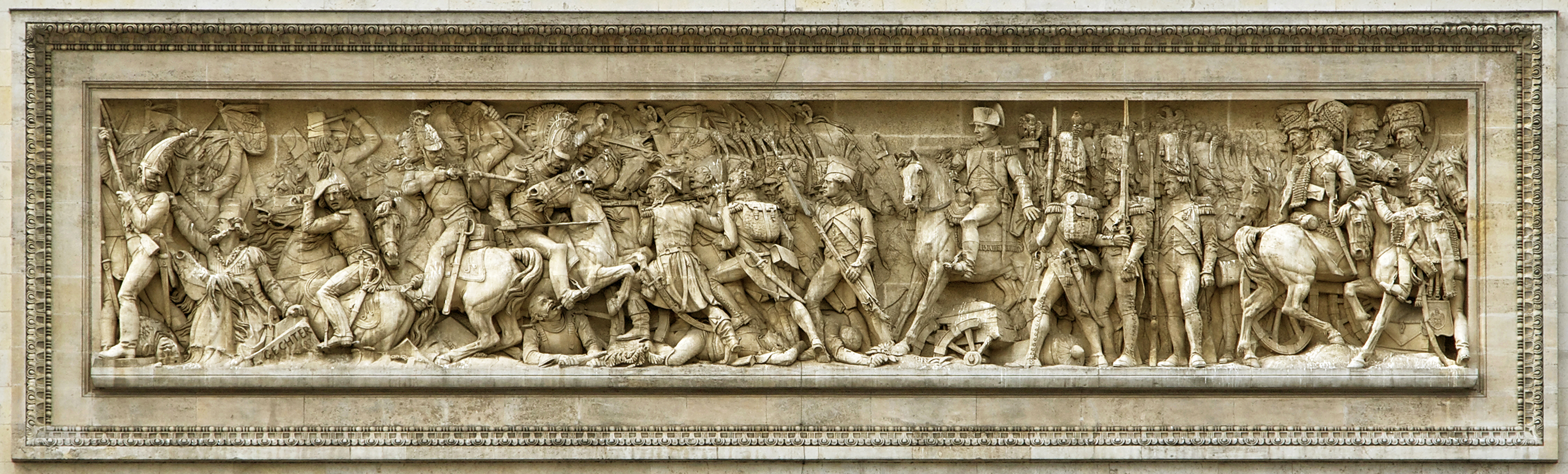
Marble relief of the Battle of Austerlitz.
