= Jacques d'Albon =

Marshal of France (d. 1562)

- Seigneur de Saint André
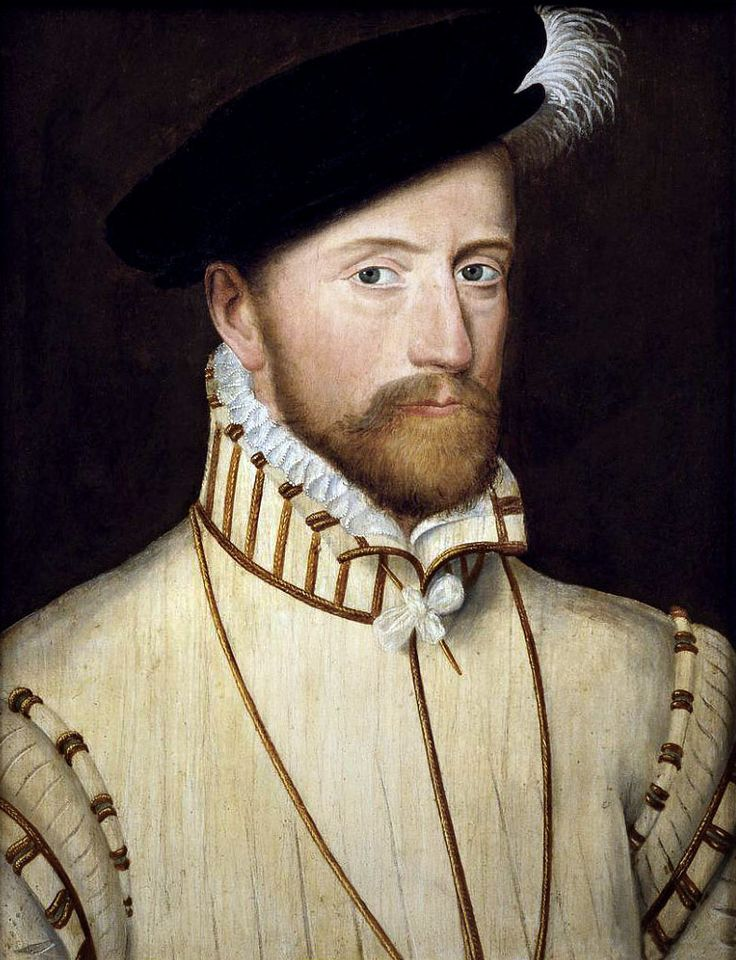
- Portrait of Jacques d'Albon c. 1562 (musée national du château et des Trianons, Versailles)
- Other titles: Marshal of France; Grand Chamberlain; Governor of Lyonnais
- Born: c. 1505; Kingdom of France
- Died: 19 December 1562; Kingdom of France
- Family: Famille d'Albon (Lyonnais)
- Spouse: Marguerite de Lustrac
- Issue: Catherine d'Albon de Saint-André
- Father: Jean d'Albon de Saint-André
- Mother: Charlotte de la Roche

Jacques d'Albon, Seigneur de Saint-André (French pronunciation: [ʒak dalbɔ̃]; c. 1505–19 December 1562) was a French governor, Marshal, and favourite of Henry II. He began his career as a confident of the dauphin during the reign of François I. Saint André and the prince were raised together under the governorship of his father at court. In 1547, at the advent of Henry's reign, he was appointed as his father's deputy, serving as lieutenant general for the Lyonnais. Concurrently he entered the king's conseil privé and was made a Marshal and Grand Chamberlain.

With the resumption of the Italian Wars, Saint André found himself serving to protect the recently acquired city of Verdun during the emperor's campaign into the region in 1552. In 1553 he was subordinate to Anne de Montmorency in the French campaign in Picardy, however neither he nor Montmorency achieved much of note. In 1557 he was present during the disaster at Saint-Quentin and was captured, while much of the rest of the army was destroyed. In captivity as a valuable prisoner for the next year he was granted leave to visit the court in the hopes he could convince the French king to come to the peace table. Having been ransomed in 1559 he was among those campaigning for the king to take a harder line on Protestantism, resulting in the Edict of Ecouen.

With the death of the king during peace celebrations, he maintained his favour under the young François II, assisting the king in combating the Conspiracy of Amboise. After the young king's premature death later that year he found himself without a place in the new liberal administration. Alongside Montmorency and Guise he formed an alliance hoping to combat Protestantism and protect the Catholic character of France, popularly known as the 'triumvirate'. He campaigned for the crown during the first war of religion, succeeding in capturing the towns of Poitiers and Angoulême before being executed on the field of Dreux after being captured by an aristocrat with whom he had personal animosity.

== Early life and family ==
Jacques d'Albon, seigneur de Saint André was the son of Jean d'Albon de Saint-André. In 1530 Jean was assigned as the governor of Henry's household. He brought his son Jacques to court with him. Jacques became an enfant d'honneur and was reared alongside the young prince. In 1539 Jean was granted the authority of governor and lieutenant general over the key region of Lyonnais.

Upon his death, his fortune was left to his daughter, the marriage of whom to Condé's son was prohibited by Catherine de Medici.

== Reign of Henry II ==
=== Favourite ===
In 1547 François I died; while Henry was not meant to be involved in the process of obsequies, he secretly viewed the funeral from a house en route with his close associates Saint André and Vielleville. Henry became emotional and began to cry; Vielleville and Saint André recounted for him how his elder brother had celebrated a false report that he had drowned years prior, hoping to channel his grief into anger. In 1547 at the advent of his reign, Saint André was made lieutenant general, governor and sénéschal of Lyonnais. The same year he was elevated to the position of grand chamberlain, and made a marshal of France. Claude d'Annebault was compelled to cede his Marshal title so that Saint André could be elevated. In his capacity as royal chamberlain he slept in the king's chamber with him, providing him a great deal of access and ability to influence the king. In 1550 he inherited his father's governorship of Lyonnais.

In the early years of his reign Saint André and his father were both regular fixtures of the Conseil Privé, and after his father's death in 1549, Saint André continued his presence in the exclusive council. By 1550 his government was expanded to the Lyonnais, Forez, Beaujolais, Auvergne and Marche. He quickly became the wealthiest and most connected man in the region.

=== War ===
With the resumption of the Italian Wars in 1551 France initially achieved success, securing a hold on the Three Bishoprics. Charles moved to recapture the towns in late 1552. Saint André was assigned to defend the town of Verdun. However, Charles selected as his target Metz, where Guise was stationed; after a few months he broke off the siege in failure. Charles V was quick to avenge this loss, and in 1553 he besieged, and then razed the town of Thérouanne. This sudden strike caught Henry off guard, who had been under the impression there was no serious threat to the city. He spent a day in his chambers, refusing to speak to anyone other than Saint André and his mistress Diane de Poitiers. In the campaign season of 1553, Montmorency and Saint André led the main royal army into Picardy. Under Montmorency's overall leadership the army would not accomplish much of note, conducting a very cautious campaign.

=== Captivity ===
In the campaign of 1557, the French army under Montmorency was brought to battle while trying to relieve the siege of Saint-Quentin and annihilated by the duke of Savoy; among the many notables captured on the field were Montmorency and Saint André. Phillip II was keenly aware of the value of the two prisoners to Henry, among his many other noble captives, as such he paroled Saint André in 1558 to bring the king on board with the Spanish peace terms. Saint André would be ransomed for 50,0000 écus in March 1559.

=== Death of the king ===
Diane and Saint André keenly encouraged Henry in his repression of Protestantism, advocating for the Edict of Compiègne and Edict of Ecouen in early 1559.

Saint André represented the king as one of his principle negotiators during the peace talks that followed his release. At the peace celebration for the conclusion of the Italian Wars in 1559, Henry was killed in an accident during a joust by his opponent Montgommery. Saint André was one of the three guards of honour who stood over the body for the forty days preceding the funeral, alongside Montmorency and Coligny.

== Reign of François II ==
Saint André was among those who maintained access to power after the accidental death of Henry II. As an ally of Guise, he was not sent away from court at the beginning of the new reign. The administration was however in dire straits, and in the general repossession of alienated royal land in the opening months of François' reign, he would lose the seigneurie of Saint-Seine-sur-Vingeanne.

=== Conspiracy of Amboise ===
Opposition to the Guise administration coalesced into a conspiracy in early 1560, with armed groups attempting to storm the court while it stayed at the castle of Amboise. On March 15 Saint André was sent out from the castle with 200 horse, and permission to requisition local garrisons for men at arms, to ensure Tours was securely held by the regime. With Condé's involvement in the conspiracy suspected, and subsequently confirmed in relation to a planned uprising in Lyon, Navarre and Condé were summoned to present themselves at court to answer the accusations of their involvement in seditious activities. Saint André provided his support to the king, flanking him during the icy meeting with the renegade princes.

== Reign of Charles IX ==
=== Alienation ===
With the crown increasingly tolerating the presence of Protestantism, under the chancellorship of Michel de l'Hôpital and regency of Catherine de Medici Saint André aligned himself with Montmorency and Guise in their opposition to this, agreeing to work together to ensure France remained Catholic in April 1561. Together they attended mass conducted by Cardinal Tournon on 7 April, and Guise and Montmorency who had been rivals for a decade exchanged the kiss of peace. Concurrently an agent of the Lyon town council reported back to the city that the governor of the Lyonnais, Saint André, had lost much of the influence he had held at court in the prior two reigns. François d'Agoult was granted the governorship of the town of Lyon, a subordinate position to Saint André in 1561. While not openly Protestant, he was deeply sympathetic to the religion in contrast to his superior.

=== Opposition ===
In January 1562, Catherine convoked an assembly at Saint-Germain, hoping to create an edict to solve the religious issue. Guise and Montmorency were absent, however Saint André attended to represent opposition to any toleration. Despite his presence the assembly would draw up the Edict of January which granted formal toleration to Protestantism for the first time.

=== First civil war ===
Shortly after the Massacre of Wassy perpetrated by Guise's men, Saint André was ordered to return to his government by Catherine on 3 March. He however ignored this order, and entered Paris alongside the Constable and Guise, to a warm welcome from the militant Catholics of the city. Now united, they began planning the logistics of raising troops and funds. In the negotiations that filled the early months of the first war of religion, Condé demanded as a condition for his disarmament the removal of several figures from court, among them Saint André.

=== Campaigning ===
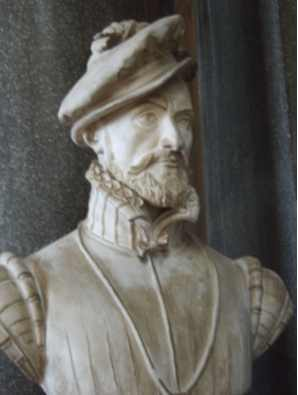
Jacques d'Albon, seigneur de Saint-André by Jean-François-Théodore Gechter, Galerie des batailles at the Palace of Versailles

With talks breaking down Saint André made an attempt to capture the city of Lyon in July, but was unsuccessful in this attempt. Moving on from the city, he seized Poitiers from the rebels in early August. He followed this victory with the equally quick recapture of Angoulême. In October, a large mercenary force that the rebels had successfully hired entered France under the leadership of Andelot. Saint André pulled the majority of the army's cavalry and the screening force that was weakly sieging Orléans to intercept this force, and prevent it linking up with the main rebel body under Condé. He would however fail in this and Andelot would outmanoeuvre him, achieving juncture. In the same month, Navarre would be killed while conducting the siege of Rouen. Upon his death the idea of inserting Saint André as a deputy to the new governor of Guyenne was floated as a possibility.

=== Dreux ===
These forces augmenting his army to a considerable strength once more, Condé decided to make an attempt on Paris; he was however unable to reach beyond the outskirts before finding himself compelled to retreat northwards. His retreat was shadowed by forces under Montmorency, Guise and Saint André, who were able to bring his army to battle at Dreux on 19 December 1562. On the field of Dreux, Saint André was second in command under the overall leadership of Montmorency. He was impatient on the field, keen to attack quickly, however his command of the right wing of the army was more theoretical than practical, and he could not advance without the permission of Guise. About two hours into the battle, with the destruction of the royal left under Montmorency, Guise and Saint Andre at last advanced into the combat annihilating the Huguenot infantry. Saint André however, would be captured on the field of battle by de Mézières, who held a personal grudge against him and executed his prisoner.

== Bibliography ==
- Baumgartner, Frederic (1988). Henry II: King of France 1547–1559. Duke University Press.
- Carroll, Stuart (1998). Noble Power during the French Wars of Religion: The Guise Affinity and the Catholic Cause in Normandy. Cambridge University Press.
- Carroll, Stuart (2009). Martyrs and Murderers: The Guise Family and the Making of Europe. Oxford University Press.
- Harding, Robert (1978). Anatomy of a Power Elite: the Provincial Governors in Early Modern France. Yale University Press.
- Holt, Mack P. (2005). The French Wars of Religion, 1562–1629. Cambridge University Press.
- Knecht, Robert (1998). Catherine de' Medici. Routledge.
- Knecht, Robert (2010). The French Wars of Religion, 1559–1598. Routledge.
- Potter, David (2001). "The French Protestant Nobility in 1562: The Associacion de Monseigneur le Prince de Condé". French History. 15 (3).
- Roelker, Nancy (1968). Queen of Navarre: Jeanne d'Albret 1528–1572. Harvard University Press.
- Roelker, Nancy (1996). One King, One Faith: The Parlement of Paris and the Religious Reformation of the Sixteenth Century. University of California Press.
- Salmon, J.H.M. (1975). Society in Crisis: France during the Sixteenth Century. Metheun & Co.
- Shimizu, J. (1970). Conflict of Loyalties: Politics and Religion in the Career of Gaspard de Coligny, Admiral of France, 1519–1572. Geneva: Librairie Droz.
- Thompson, James (1909). The Wars of Religion in France 1559–1576: The Huguenots, Catherine de Medici and Philip II. University of Chicago Press.
- Wood, James (2002). The King's Army: Warfare, Soldiers and Society during the Wars of Religion in France, 1562–1576. Cambridge University Press.
