= Galerie des Batailles =

Gallery in the Palace of Versailles

Coordinates: 48°48′12.1″N 2°07′14.5″E

View of the Galerie des Batailles

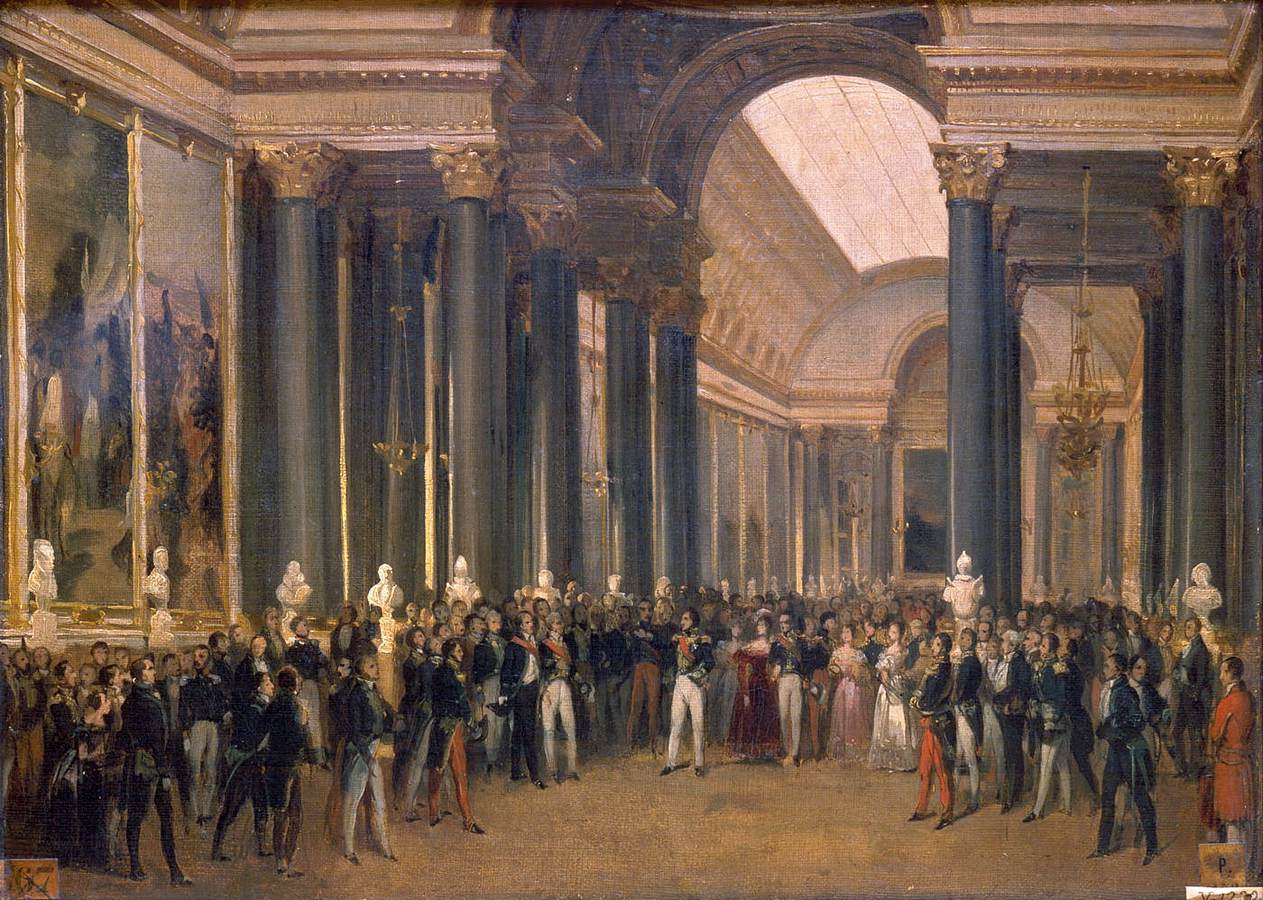
Louis-Philippe opening the Galerie des Batailles, 10 June 1837, painted by François-Joseph Heim

Central part of the ceiling of the Galerie des Batailles

The Galerie des Batailles (French: [ɡalʁi de bataj]; English: "Gallery of Battles") is a gallery occupying the first floor of the Aile du Midi of the Palace of Versailles, joining onto the grand and petit appartement de la reine. 120 m (390 ft) long and 13 m (43 ft) wide, it is an epigone of the Grande Galerie of the Louvre and was intended to glorify French military history from the Battle of Tolbiac (traditionally dated 496) to the Battle of Wagram (5–6 July 1809).

== History ==
The gallery was a major component of the Musée de l'Histoire de France created by Louis-Philippe I. It replaced apartments which had been occupied in the 17th and 18th centuries by:

- Louis XIV's brother Philippe I, Duke of Orléans and his second wife, Elizabeth Charlotte, Madame Palatine
- Philippe II, Duke of Orléans (regent during Louis XV's minority) and his wife
- the regent's son Louis d'Orléans, Duke of Orléans
- Maria Josepha of Saxony, Dauphine of France
- Charles, comte d'Artois
- Princess Élisabeth of France

The architects Pierre-François-Léonard Fontaine and Frédéric Nepveu created a solemn decorative scheme for it, with a wide cornice supporting a coffered painted ceiling with entablatures supported by Corinthian columns along the length of the gallery. 13 bronze tablets on the wall are inscribed with the names of princes, admirals, constables, marshals and warriors killed or wounded whilst fighting for France. There are also busts placed on supports against the columns and between the paintings.

The main contents of the rooms, however, were envisaged as the vast paintings showing major military events in French history, some already in existence but mostly specially commissioned for the Galerie. While a number of them were of questionable quality, a few masterpieces, such as the Battle of Taillebourg by Eugène Delacroix, were displayed here.

== List of busts and paintings ==
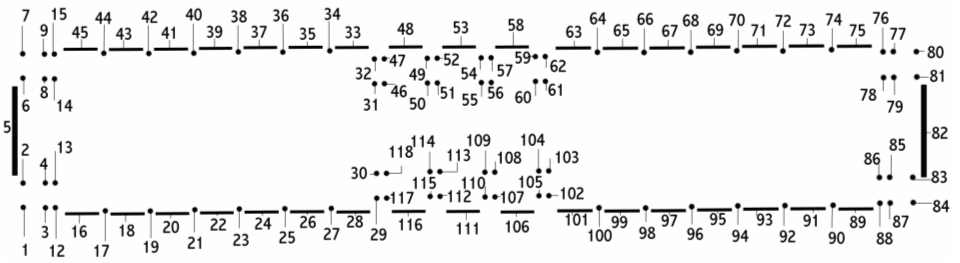
Floor plan of the Galerie des Batailles

Numbers correspond to floor plan.

1. Joseph-Antoine, prince Poniatowski, maréchal de l'Empire (1762–1813). Artist : François-Augustin Caunois (1787–1859).
2. Adolphe Édouard Casimir Joseph Mortier, duc de Trévise, maréchal de l'Empire (1768–1835). Artist : Théophile-François Marcel Bra (1797–1863).
3. Jean-Baptiste Bessières, duc d'Istries, maréchal de l'Empire (1768–1813). Artist : François Masson (1745–1807).
4. Henri LXI, prince de Reuss-Schleiz, général de brigade in French service (1784–1813). Artist : Charles-François Lebœuf.
5. Battle of Tolbiac, won by Clovis I over the Alamanni in 496. Artist : Ary Scheffer (1795–1858). 4.15m by 4.65m
6. Simon de Montfort, 5th Earl of Leicester, duke of Narbonne (c 1150–1218). Artist : Jean-Jacques Feuchère (1807–1852).
7. Robert d'Artois, son of Otto IV and Mahaut d'Artois (died 1317). Artist : Jean-Jacques Flatters (1786–1845).
8. Hugues Quieret, French admiral, died 1340. Artist : Charles Émile Seurre (1798–1858).
9. Nicolas Béhuchet, French admiral, died 1340. Artist : Bernard Seurre (1795–1867).
10. Commemorative tablet at the north end of the galerie.
11. Commemorative tablet at the north end of the galerie.
12. Alexandre-Antoine Hureau, comte de Sénarmont, général de division (1732–1810). Artist : Antoine Laurent Dantan the Elder (1798–1878).
13. César Charles Étienne, comte Gudin, général de division (1768–1812). Artist : Louis-Denis Caillouette (1790–1868) (also spelled Caillouet or Cailhouët).
14. Walter VI of Brienne, Duke of Athens, constable of France in 1356 (died 1356). Artist : Justin-Marie Lequien (1796–1882).
15. Peter I, Duke of Bourbon (c 1311–1356). Artist : Louis-Eugène Bion (1807–1860).
16. Battle of Friedland, 14 June 1807, 5.43m by 4.65m, showing Napoleon I and count Nicolas Charles Oudinot
17. Antoine Louis Charles, comte Lasalle, général de division (1775–1809). Artist : after Auguste Taunay (1768–1824).
18. Battle of Wagram, 6 July 1809, by Horace Vernet. Dimensions : 5.3m by 4.65m, showing Napoleon I and the duc d'Istrie.
19. Jean-Baptiste Cervoni, général de division (1765–1809). Artist : after Pietro Cardelli (1776–1822).
20. Battle of Jena, 14 October 1806, 5.43m by 4.65m, showing Napoleon I, Joachim Murat and Louis Alexandre Berthier, dated and signed "Horace Vernet 1836"
21. Jean Lannes, duc de Montebello, maréchal de l'Empire (1769–1809). Artist : François Masson (1745–1807).
22. Battle of Austerlitz, 2 December 1805, oil on canvas, sketch after an original that in 1846 was in the Paillet collection, commissioned by Napoleon I for the ceiling of the salle du Conseil d'État at the palais des Tuileries in Paris, showing Napoleon accompanied by Jean Rapp, 9.58m by 5.10m
23. Nicolas-Bernard, général-baron Guiot de Lacour, général de division (1771–1809). Mortally wounded at Wagram (wearing the cross of the Légion d'honneur and the cross of the Military Order of St. Henry of Saxony). Artist : Jean-Baptiste Joseph Debay, le Fils (1802–1862)
24. Battle of Hohenlinden, 3 December 1800, showing Jean Victor Moreau, Michel Ney, Emmanuel de Grouchy, Jean de Habsburg, signed "H Schopin".
25. André Bruno de Frévol, comte de La Coste, général de brigade (1775–1809). After : Claude Michel (known as Clodion) (1738–1814).
26. Second Battle of Zürich, 25 September 1799, oil on canvas, showing André Masséna, the comte Nicolase, Charles Oudinot and count Honoré Charles Reille. Artist : François Bouchot, signed 1837. Commissioned by Louis-Philippe in 1835, 5.43 m by 4.65 m
27. Claude-Louis-Constant Corbineau, général de brigade (1772–1807). Artist : Philippe Joseph Henri Lemaire (1798–1880).
28. Battle of Rivoli.
29. Jacques Desjardin, général de division (1759–1807) (killed at the battle of Eylau). Artist:Antoine Laurent Dantan, l'Aîné (1798–1878)
30. Joseph Sécret Pascal-Vallongue, général de Brigade (1763–1806). Artist : Jean-Baptiste-Joseph Debay, le Père (1779–1863).
31. Charles the Bold, duke of Burgundy (1433–1477). Artist : Charles-François Lebœuf (1792–1865), Nanteuil, also known as Nanteuil-Lebœuf.
32. Prigent de Coëtivy, sire de Coëtivy, Admiral of France. Killed at the siege of Cherbourg (1450).
33. Battle of Cassel. Won by Philippe de Valois. 23 August 1328. 5.43m by 4.65m, showing Philip and Nicolas Zonnekin, dated and signed "Scheffer Henry 1837".
34. John Stewart, Earl of Buchan, constable of France. Killed at the Battle of Verneuil (1424)
35. Battle of Mons-en-Pévèle, won on 18 August 1304 by Philip the Fair against the Flemish army. Produced : c 1839. Artist : Charles-Philippe Larivière (1798–1876). 4.65m by 5.43 m
36. Anthony, Duke of Brabant, killed at the battle of Agincourt in 1415.
37. Battle of Taillebourg, won by Saint Louis on 21 July 1242. Artist : Eugène Delacroix (1798–1863). Date : 1837. 4.89m by 5.54 m
38. Jacques de Châtillon de Dampierre, Amiral de France. Killed at the battle of Agincourt 1415.
39. Philippe-Auguste before the battle of Bouvines, 27 July 1214. Artist : Horace Vernet (1789–1863). Date : 1827. Technique : oil on canvas, 5.1m by 9.58m
40. Jean de Vienne. Admiral of France. Killed at the battle of Nicopolis 1396.
41. Count Eudes defending Paris against the Normans in 885, 5.42m by 4.65m, commissioned by Louis-Philippe in 1834, signed "V. Schnetz".
42. Charles de Blois, killed at Auray, 1364
43. Charlemagne receiving the submission of Widukind, king of the Saxons at Paderborn in 785. Artist : Ary Scheffer (1795–1858); 4.65m by 5.42m
44. James I, Count of La Marche, constable of France. Killed at the battle of Brignais 1361.
45. Battle of Tours, October 732. Artist: Charles de Steuben. Dimensions : 5.42m by 4.65m, showing Charles Martel, Odo the Great and Abd-el-Rahman, dated and signed "STEUBEN 1837".
46. Louis d’Armagnac, duke of Nemours. Killed at Gérignole. 1503. (Rude)
47. Gaston of Foix, Duke of Nemours. Killed at the battle of Ravenna 1512
48. Battle of Cocherel, near Évreux, won by Bertrand du Guesclin over the troops of Charles II of Navarre, 16 May 1364. Artist : Charles-Philippe Larivière (1798–1876). Dated: c 1837. 4.25m by 2.6m
49. Pierre du Terrail seigneur de Bayard. Killed at Rebec 1524.
50. Guillaume Gouffier de Bonnivet, admiral of France, killed at Pavia, 1525.
51. Jacques II de Chabannes de La Palice known as La Palice, marshal of France, killed at Pavia 1525.
52. Jean de Bourbon, comte de Soissons. Killed at Saint-Quentin, 1557.
53. Raising of the Siege of Orléans by Joan of Arc
54. André de Montalembert seigneur d’Essé. Killed at the siege of Terouanne. 1555. (Taley)
55. Piero Strozzi. Killed at Thionville. 1553 (Taley)
56. Anne, duc de Montmorency, (1572–1567)
57. Jacques d'Albon, seigneur de Saint-André, maréchal de France (c 1505–1562). Artist : Jean-François-Théodore Gechter (1796–1844).
58. Battle of Castillon won by Jean de Dunois over the English forces under Lord Talbot, 17 July 1453.
59. Charles de La Rochefoucauld, comte de Randan.
60. Antoine de Bourbon. King of Navarre
61. Anne, duc de Joyeuse
62. Claude de Loraine, duc d’Aumale
63. Entry of Charles VIII into Naples. 12 May 1495.
64. Bernard de Nogaret, seigneur de Lavalette, Amiral de France
65. Battle of Marignano won by Francis I of France on 14 September 1515, showing Francis ordering his troops to stop pursuing the Swiss. Artist : Alexandre-Évariste Fragonard (1780–1850) 4.65m by 5.43m
66. Armand de Gontaut, baron de Biron. Maréchal de France. Killed at Épernay 1592. Artist: Jean-Baptiste-Joseph Debay, le Père (1779–1863)
67. Capture of Calais by Francis, Duke of Guise, on 9 January 1558. Artist : François-Édouard Picot (1786–1868). 4.65m by 5.43 m
68. Jean d'Aumont, maréchal de France, killed at Combourg in Brittany, 1595. Artist : Auguste-Alexandre Dumont(1801–1884), known as Auguste or Augustin Dumont
69. Henry IV's entry into Paris, 22 March 1594. Artist : François Pascal Simon Gérard(baron) (1770–1837). 5.1m by 9.58 m
70. André Baptiste de Brancas, seigneur de Villars, amiral de France, killed at the Siege of Doullens, in 1595. (Victor Thérasse)
71. Battle of Rocroi, 19 May 1643, the duc d'Enghien ordering his troops to stop fighting the Spanish, who have come to him to surrender. Artist : François Joseph Heim (1787–1865.)vers 1834, 4.65m by 5.43m
72. Jean du Caylarde, marquis de Toiras, Killed at Fontaneto in the Milanais. 1636. (Calnouet)
73. The Grand Condé at the battle of Lens, 20 August 1648, victory over the Spanish troops commanded by archduke Leopold. Circa 1835, Artist : Jean-Pierre Franque (1774–1860). 4.65m by 5.43m
74. Charles de Créquy, maréchal de France, killed before the fort of Breme, 1636. (Davitan the younger)
75. Battle of the Dunes at the siege of Dunkirk, won by the maréchal de Turenne over the Spanish in June 1658. Artist : Charles-Philippe Larivière(1798–1876). Date : 1837. 4.65m by 5.43m
76. Manassès de Pas, marquis de Feuquières. Lieutenant général des armées du roi. Killed at Thionville in 1640. (Philippe Joseph Henri Lemaire)
77. Armand de Maillé, marquis de Brézé, duc de Fronsac. Amiral de France. Killed at the battle of Orbetello, 1646
78. Jean Baptiste Budes baron de Guébriant. Maréchal de France. Killed at Rothweil, 1643. (Jean-Pierre Cortot)
79. Jacques marquis de Castelnau, maréchal de France. Killed at Dunkirk in 1653.
80. Jean de Gassion Maréchal de France. Killed at Lens in 1647.
81. Jacques de Rougé, marquis du Plessis-Bellière. Lieutenant général des armées du roi. Killed at Castellamare in 1654 (Jean Bernard Duseigneur)
82. Siege of Valenciennes. "Louis XIV", oil on canvas, dated "1837", the year it was commissioned by Louis-Philippe; 4.65m by 4.15m
83. François, Duke of Beaufort. Admiral of France. Killed at the Siege of Candia in 1669 (Mercier)
84. Henri de La Tour d’Auvergne vicomte de Turenne. Maréchal de France. Killed near Sasbach in 1675 (Flatter)
85. Pierre Claude Berbier du Metz, lieutenant général des armées du roi. Killed at the battle of Fleurus, 1690 (François Jouffroy)
86. Nicolas de la Brousse comte de Vertillac. Maréchal des camps et armées du roi. Killed near Bossu. 1693. (Lescorné)
87. Charles Paris d'Orléans, Duke of Longueville. Killed during the Rhine crossing in 1672. (François Jouffroy)
88. Jean-Baptiste Cassagnet marquis de Tilladet, lieutenant général des armées du roi. Killed at Steenkerque en 1692. (Debay)
89. Battle of Marsaglia, won by Nicolas Catinat over the Piedmontese troops of Victor Amadeus II of Sardinia assisted by Prince Eugene of Savoy, on 4 October 1693. Artist: Devéria Eugène (1805–1865). Date: 1837; 4.65m by 5.43m
90. Béat Jacques de la Tour Chatillon comte de Zurlauben. Lieutenant général des armées du roi. Killed at Hochstett in 1704. (François Jouffroy)
91. Battle of Villaviciosa won by Louis Joseph, Duke of Vendôme over count Guido Starhemberg on 10 December 1710. Artist : Jean Alaux, known as Le Romain (1786–1864) Date : 1836. 4.65m by 5.43m
92. Ferdinand, comte de Marsin, maréchal de France. Killed at Turin. 1706 (Jouffroy)
93. Battle of Denain, won by Claude Louis Hector de Villars over Prince Eugene of Savoy on 24 July 1712. Artist : Jean Alaux, known as Le Romain (1786–1864). Date : 1839. 4.65m by 5.43m
94. James FitzJames, 1st Duke of Berwick, marshal (1671–1734) Artist : Antoine-Laurent Dantan, the Elder (1798–1878)
95. The Battle of Fontenoy, 11 May 1745, showing Maurice de Saxe presenting the captured British and Dutch prisoners and colours to Louis XV and the dauphin; Artist: Horace Vernet (1789–1863). Date:1828. 5.1m by 9.58m
96. Louis Joseph de Saint Véran, marquis de Montcalm. Lieutenant général des armées du roi. Killed at the Battle of the Plains of Abraham in 1759. (Francisque Duret)
97. Siege of Yorktown. général Rochambeau and George Washington give the final orders to attack. October 1781
98. Pierre-François, Marquess of Rougé. Lieutenant général des armées du roi. Killed at Villinghausen in 1761 (L. Debay)
99. Battle of Lawfeld, 2 July 1747 : Louis XV pointing out the village of Lawfeld to Maurice de Saxe. Artist :Pierre Lenfant (1704–1787). Period : reign of Louis XV (1723–1774). 2.75m by 2.5m
100. Jacques Christophe Coquille Dugommier. Commander in chief. Killed at the Battle of the Black Mountain. 1794 (Antoine-Denis Chaudet)
101. Battle of Fleurus, won by Jean-Baptiste Jourdan over the Austrian forces led by the princes of Coburg and Orange on 26 June 1794. Date : 1837. Oil on canvas, 4.65m by 5.43m.
102. Amédée Emmanuel François Laharpe. Général de division. Killed in the crossing of the River Po. 1796. (Félix Lecomte)
103. Jean Gilles André Robert, général de brigade. Killed at the Battle of Arcole in 1796. (Gois fils)
104. Martial Beyrand, général de brigade. Killed at Castiglione in 1796. (Corbet)
105. Charles Abattucci. Général de division. Killed at Huningue. 1796. (Dubray)
106. Siege of Yorktown
107. Jean-Jacques Causse. Général de brigade. Killed at Dego. 1796. (E. Dumont)
108. Pierre Banel. Général de Brigade. Killed at Cossaria. 1796. (Lorenzo Bartolini)
109. Louis Marie de Caffarelli du Falga. Général de division. Killed at the Siege of Acre in 1799. François Masson (1745–1807)
110. Barthélemy Catherine Joubert, Général en chef of the armée d’Italie. Killed at the Battle of Novi in 1799. (Louis-Simon Boizot)
111. Commemorative plaques
112. Dominique Martin Dupuy. Général de brigade. Killed in Cairo in 1798. (Philippe-Laurent Roland)
113. François Paul Brueys, comte d’Aigalliers. Vice-amiral. Killed at the Battle of the Nile in 1799. (Flatters)
114. Louis Marie, vicomte de Noailles. Général de brigade. Died of wounds in Havana. 1804. (Dantan aîné)
115. Jean Louis Debilly. Général de brigade. Killed at the battle of Jena. 1806. (J.Debay)
116. -
117. Jean Baptiste Kléber, général en chef (1753–1800). After Philippe Joseph Henri Lemaire (1798–1880) (location uncertain)
118. François Louis de Morlan. Killed at the battle of Austerlitz in 1805. (Charpentier)

== Damage ==
In 1978, Breton nationalists of the Breton Revolutionary Army caused major damage to the Galerie, planting a bomb. Having failed to plant one in the Hall of Mirrors, they moved to the galerie des Batailles, targeting Napoleon as a symbol of French colonialism.

== See also ==
- Grande Galerie

== Bibliography ==
- Constans, Claire (1985). "1837: L'inauguration par Louis-Philippe du musée dédié 'À Toutes les gloires de la France'". Colloque de Versailles
- Mauguin, Georges (1937). "L’Inauguration du Musée de Versailles". Revue de l’histoire de Versailles: 112–146
- Verlet, Pierre (1985). Le château de Versailles. Paris: Librairie Arthème Fayard.
