= Order of Glory (Tunisia) =

Honorary order in Tunisia

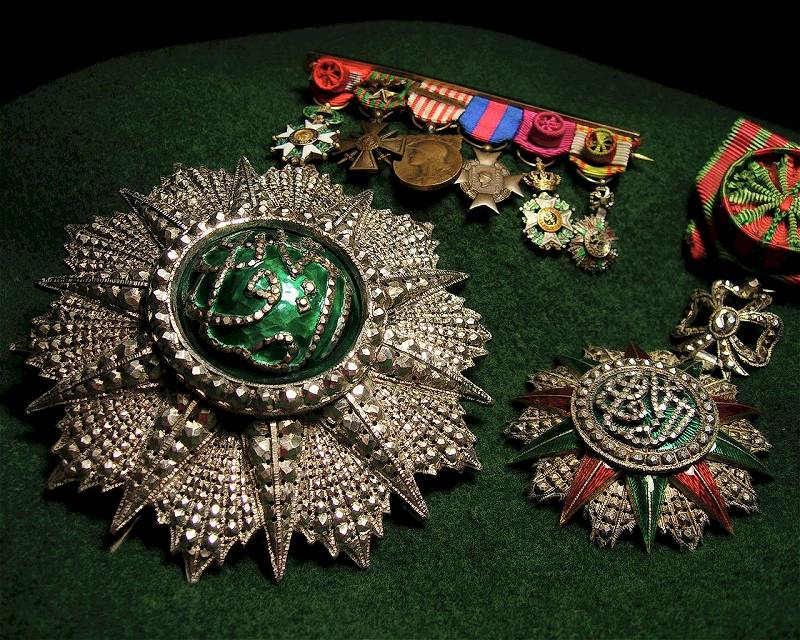
Grand cross, miniature, and officer class

The Order of Glory (Turkish: İftihar Nişanı or Arabic: نيشان الافتخار, romanized: Nīšān al-iftiḫār) was a Tunisian honorary order founded in 1835 by Al-Mustafa ibn Mahmud the Bey of Tunisia. The order was awarded until the constitutional role of the Bey was abolished following 1957.

== Background information ==
The order essentially existed in two different models: the first awarded from its creation in 1835 and the second following 1859. Initially awarded in a single class, the order was reorganized and awarded in five classes following 1843 and expanded to six classes in 1882:

1. Grand Cordon
2. Grand-officer
3. Commander
4. Officer
5. Knight of 1st class
6. Knight of 2nd class

This order could be awarded to people of French nationality, cities (like Verdun), and other notable foreigners with some connection to Tunisia. It was given by the bey of Tunis on a proposal from the chief vizier for Tunisian subjects and, in all the other cases, on a proposal from the resident general of France (who served as the de facto Foreign Minister of Tunisia). Although the resident general had a quota, this last remains about it always the large Master. Each bey having put his monogram on the center of the decoration, it is possible to determine the approximate award date of each order.

== Examples of the decoration ==
The typical decoration is manufactured from solid silver with green and red enameled rays for some classes. The reverse of the decoration as well as the bow and suspension ring may have jeweler, date, and acceptance markings. These particular decorations (second model) were awarded by Ali Muddat ibn al-Husayn Bey (1882–1902).

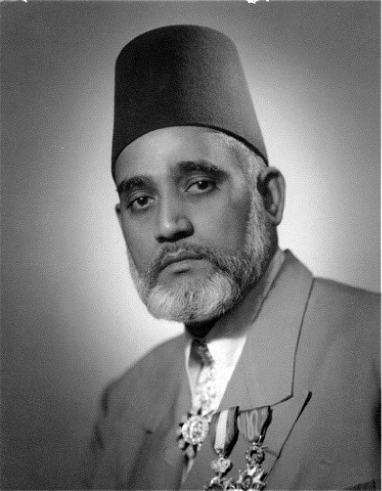
JM Abdul Aziz wears the Commander around his neck.

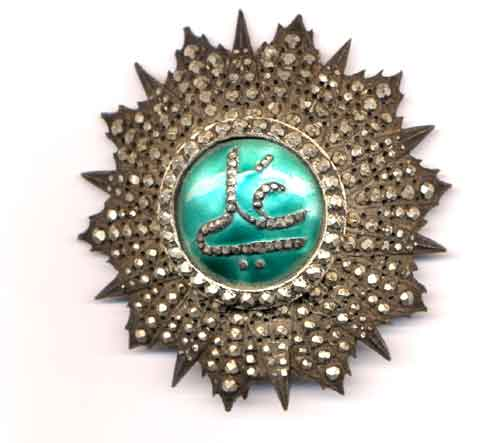
Grand-officer (Tunisian made)

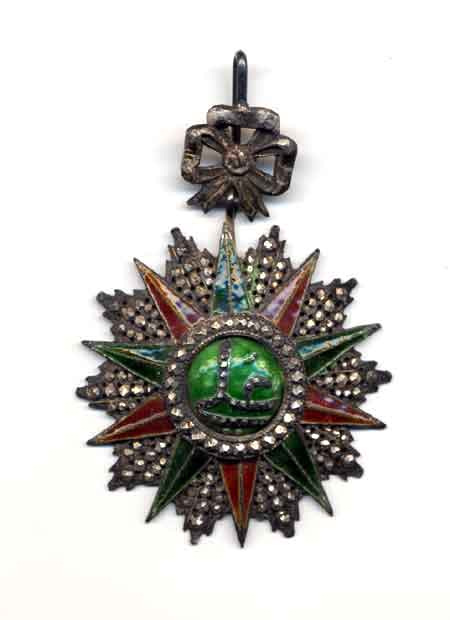
Commander (detail) (Tunisian made)

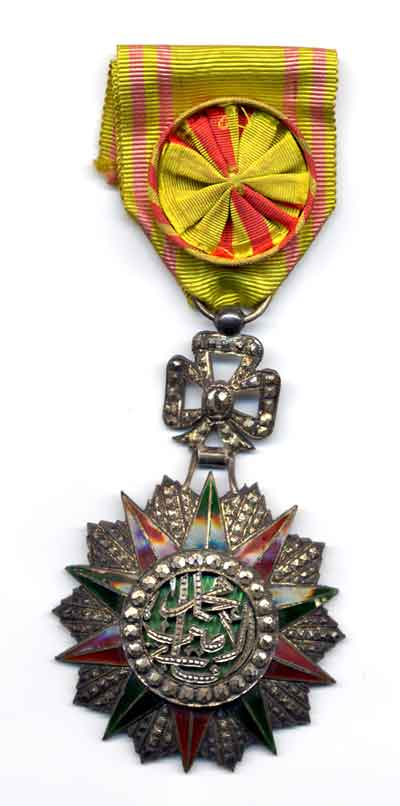
Officer (detail) (French made)

These particular decorations were awarded by Muhammad III as-Sadiq Bey (1859–1882) and illustrate the differences that can exist between French and local Tunisian manufactured decorations:

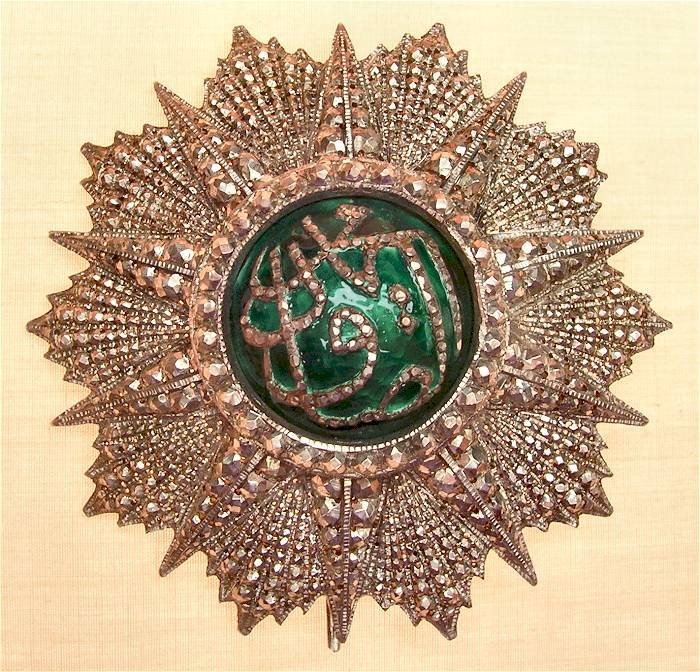
Grand-officer (Tunisian made)

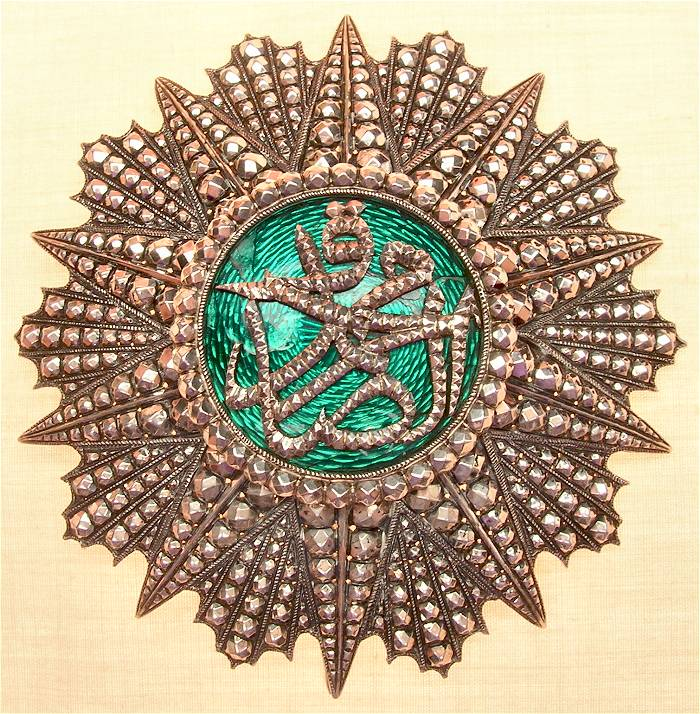
Grand-officer (French made)

== Text of the diploma ==
Awardees were given a diploma which in general had the following text (translated):

All praises be to God alone! On behalf of the Servant of God in His Glory, he who places his trust in God and gives unto Him the sole care of his fate [name of the bey], Possesseur of the Kingdom of Tunis. [name of the decorated person] on the proposal of Our Foreign Minister, who apprised us of your noble qualities, we bestowed this decoration on you. Our name is engraved thereupon and it is [Rank and class] of Our Order of Nichan Iftikhar Wear it with joy and happiness! Written [date of decoration].

These two diplomas awarded to the same person in 1927, commander class, illustrate the order's typical diplomas:

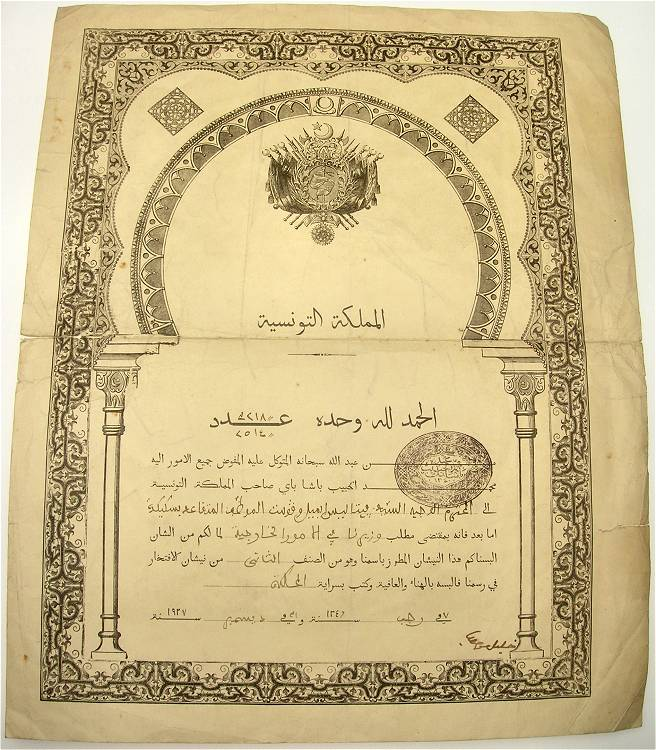
Arabic diploma

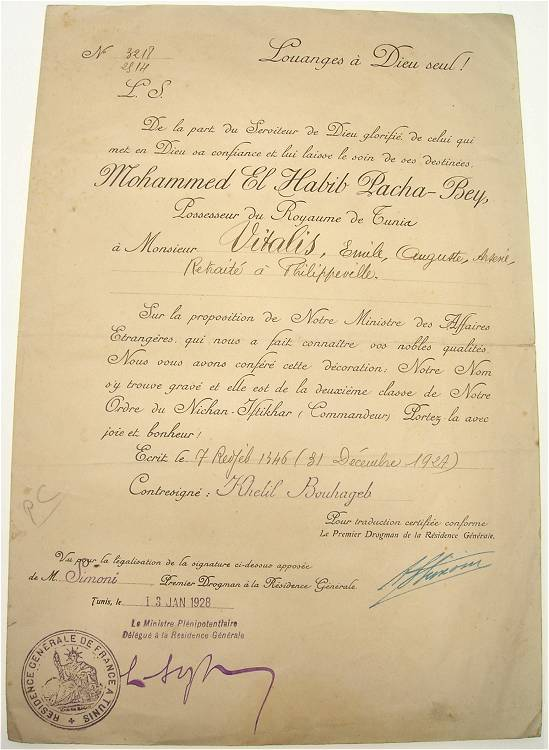
French diploma
