= House of Rougé =

French noble family

Coat of Arms de Rougé Family

The Rougé family is a family of the French nobility from Brittany and Anjou known since 1045 and that has a traced proven lineage since the year 1375.

Most historians believe that the exiting Rougé family from Anjou comes from the medieval Rougé family known since 1045, ruling over the lordship of Rougé in Brittany, a line of the princes of Brittany, but the link between the des Rues family and the former de Rougé family is not yet clearly proven, even though highly possible.

Many members of this family have distinguished themselves as generals, members of parliament, peers of France, senators, churchmen, diplomats, and academics.

== Origins ==
Formerly known as des Rues family (after the lordship they held in Anjou since at least 1220), they used the name de Rougé at the beginning of the 16th century after the older family of the same name de Rougé (known since 1045) became extinct.

The proven filiation of the existing de Rougé family is established since Huet des Rues, married in 1375 with Jeanne d'Erbrée or with Jean II des Rues, married in 1421 with Jeanne d’Orvaux.

Pierre des Rues, who was confirmed noble in 1667 with proof dating back to 1530, was at the origin of two branches, the main Rougé branch (still existing) and the junior "du Plessis-Bellière" branch (extinct in 1794).

Pierre-François de Rougé (1702-1761), lieutenant-general, is the ancestor of all current members of this family, his eldest son Bonabes Alexis de Rougé (1751-1783), colonel involved in the American Revolutionary War, having formed the elder branch, and his younger son François Pierre Olivier de Rougé (1756-1816), lieutenant-general, the younger line, also known as "second Plessis-Bellière branch".

== Notable family members ==
- Mathurin de Rougé, Governor of Le Mans during the 16th century, known for his firm anti-huguenot leadership, knight of the Order of St. Michael,
- Pierre François de Rougé (1702–1761), marquis of Rougé, French general, killed in action in the battle of Villinghausen, Germany,
- Gabriel-Louis de Rougé (1729–1772), abbot, vicar-general and bishop of Périgueux (1772).

Elder branch, existing :

- Bonabes Jean Catherine Alexis de Rougé (1751–1783), French colonel who fought in the American Revolutionary War, and died at sea in 1783,
- his wife Natalie Victurnienne, Marchioness of Rougé (1759–1828), friend of Queen Marie-Antoinette,
- Bonabes VI Louis Victurnien Alexis de Rougé (1778–1839), marquis de Rougé, Peer of France in 1815,
- Aymeric de Rougé d'Aligre, count de Rougé d'Aligre (born 1982), owner of château de Baronville and founder of Champagne Comte de Rougé,
- Adrien de Rougé (1782–1838), comte de Rougé, Member of the Assemblée Nationale, and then Peer of France in 1827,

First Plessis-Bellière branch, extinct in 1794 :

- Jacques de Rougé du Plessis-Bellière (1602–1654), marquis du Plessis-Bellière, French general, killed in action in Torre Annunziata/Castellammare di Stabia, near Naples in a cavalry charge,
- Catherine de Rougé du Plessis-Bellière (1707–1794), duchess of Elbeuf, princess of Lorraine, after her marriage in 1747 with Emmanuel Maurice prince of Lorraine, duke of Elbeuf.

Cadet branch, second Plessis-Bellière branch, existing :

- Emmanuel de Rougé (1811–1872), viscount de Rougé, Egyptologist, Professor at the Collège de France, last senator named by emperor Napoleon III,
- Alain de Rougé (1871–1936), Member of the Assemblée Nationale,
- Arthur de Rougé (1844–1913), count of Rougé, Spanish duke of Caylus and Grandee of Spain in 1893 (by inheritance of the family Robert de Lignerac).
- Olivier de Rougé (1862-1932), viscount de Rougé, senator, founder of the cattle breed "Maine-Anjou" (now Rouge des Près),
- Bonabes de Rougé (1891–1975), count de Rougé, Secretary General of the Red Cross from 1936 to 1957.

== Portrait Gallery ==
Jacques de Rougé, marquis du Plessis-Bellière

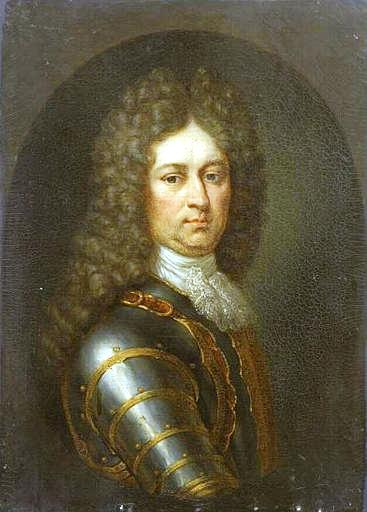
François-Henri de Rougé, marquis du Plessis-Bellière, French general

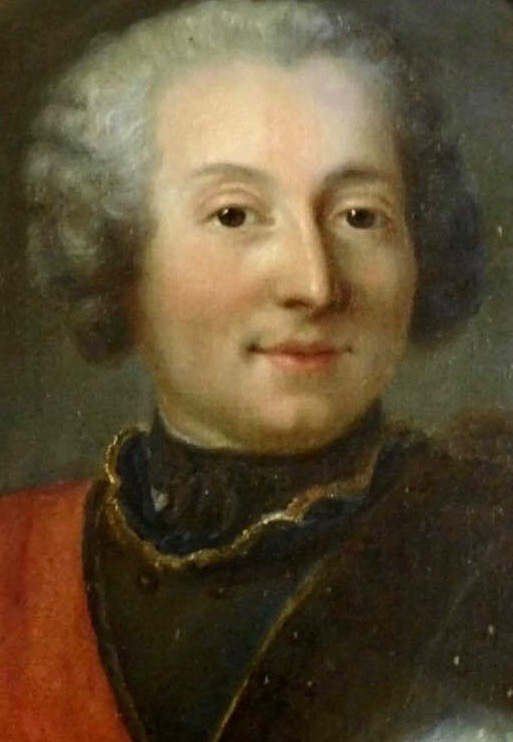
Pierre-François de Rougé, marquis de Rougé, killed in action in Germany in 1761

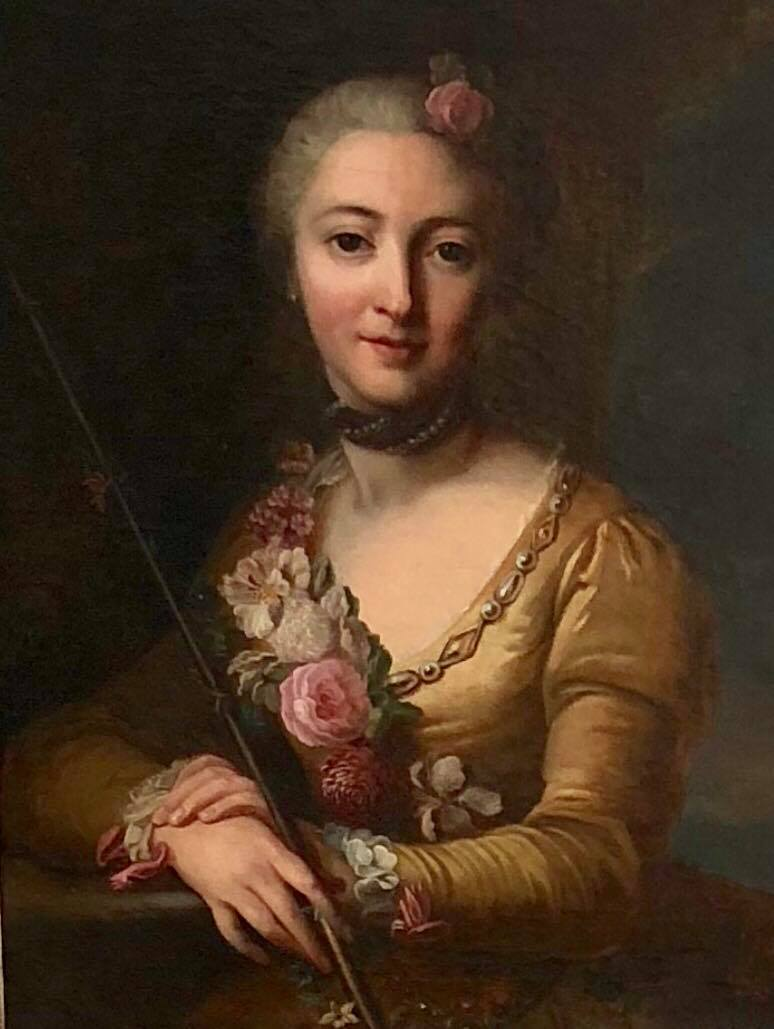
Julie de Coëtmen, marquise de Rougé

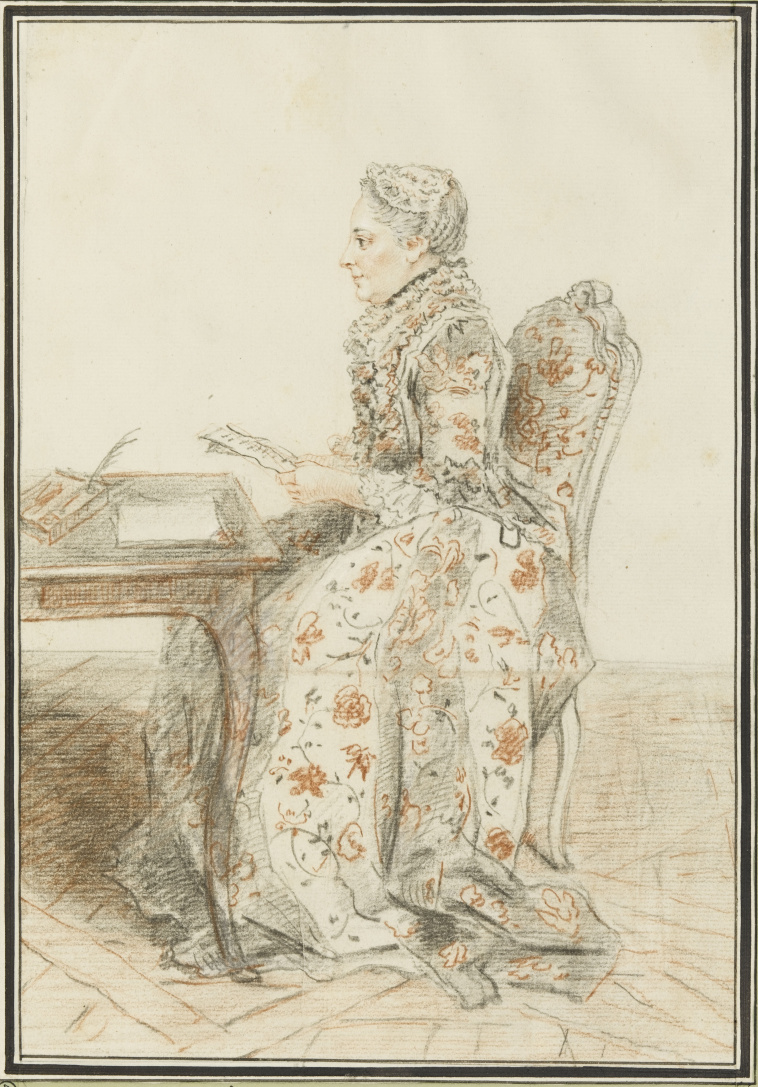
Marie-Thérèse d'Albert d'Ailly, marquise du Plessis-Bellière, by Carmontelle

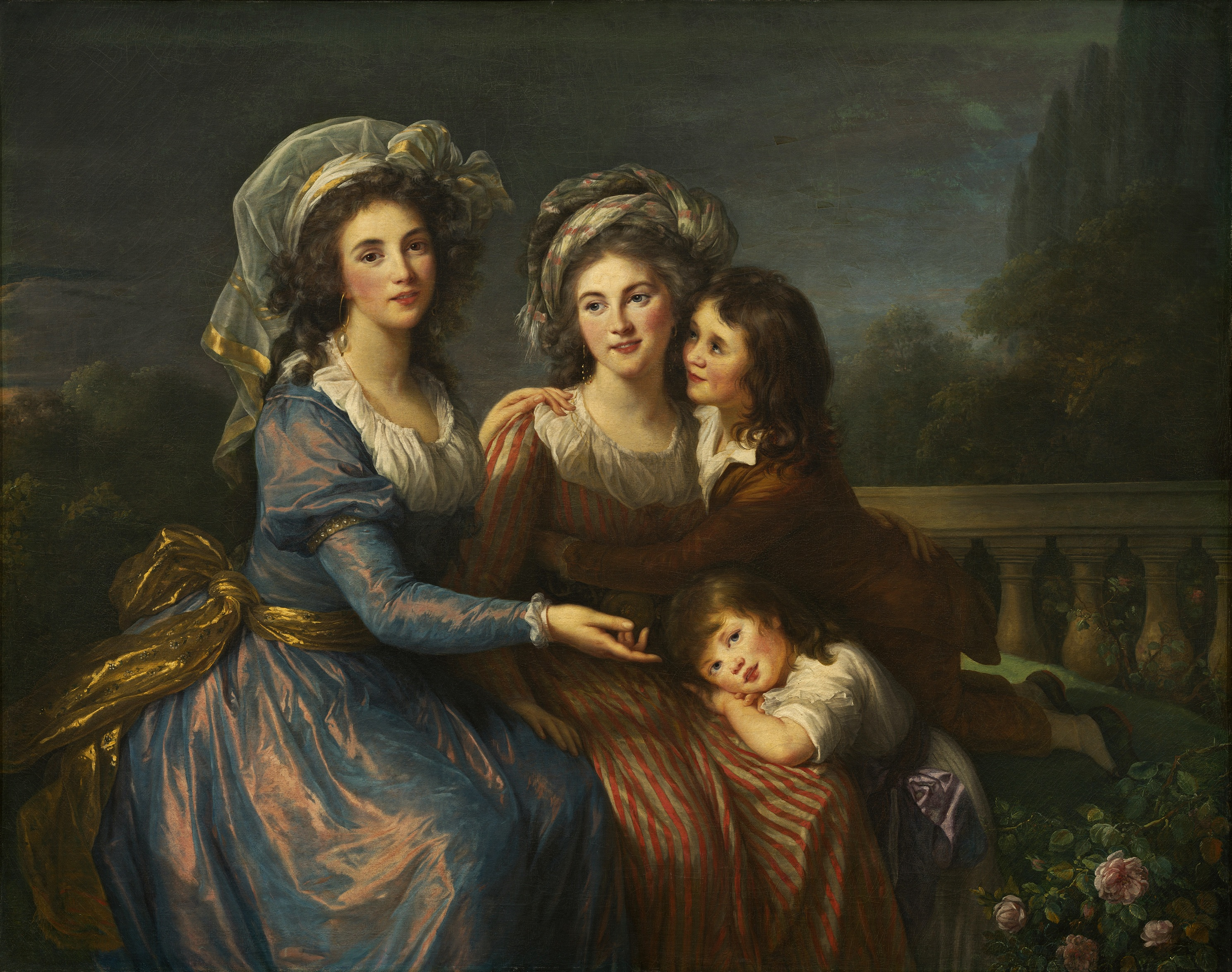
Natalie Victurnienne de Mortemart, marquise de Rougé, by Vigée-Lebrun

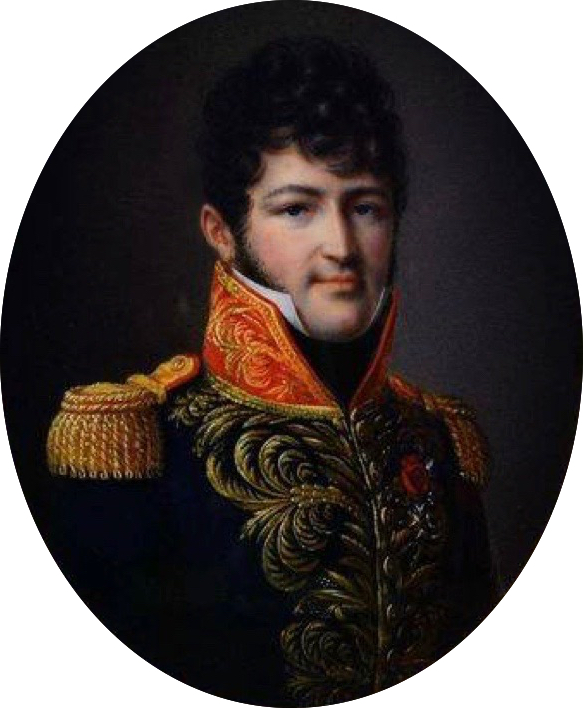
Bonabes Alexis de Rougé, marquis de Rougé and Peer of France

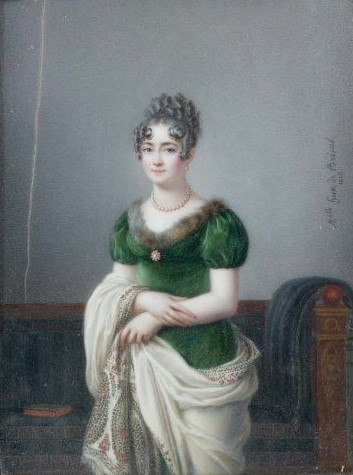
Alexandrine Thimarette de Crussol d'Uzès, marquise de Rougé

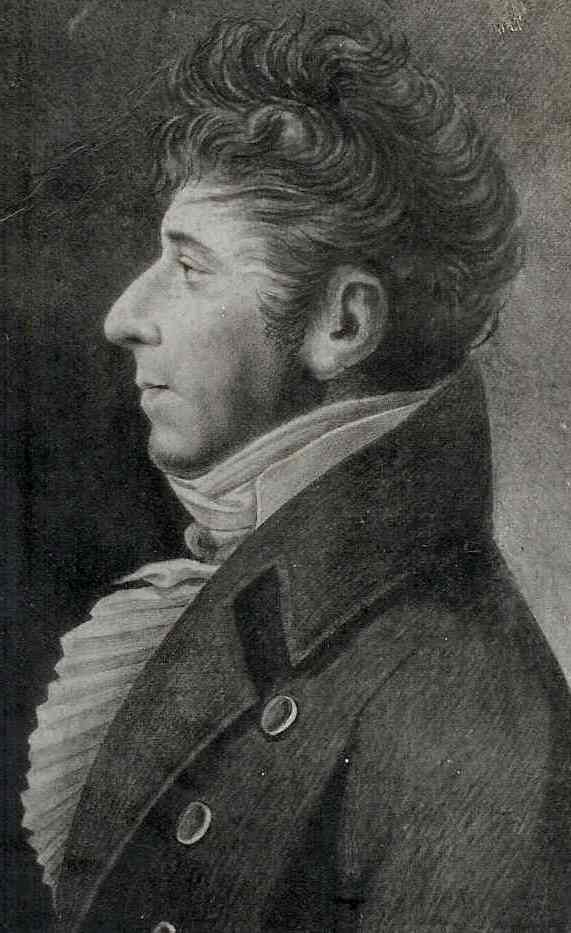
Count François-Pierre-Olivier de Rougé, French General

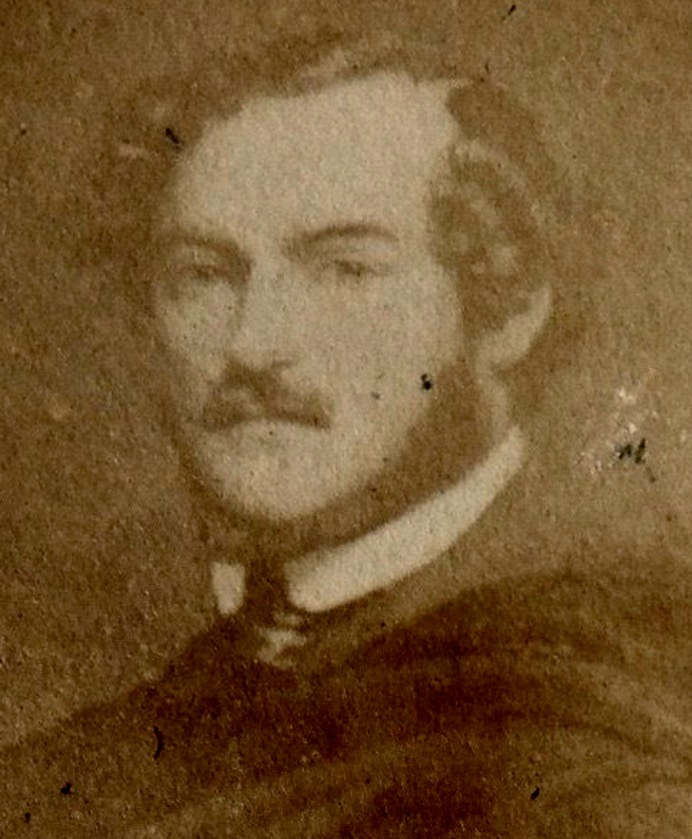
Count Hervé de Rougé

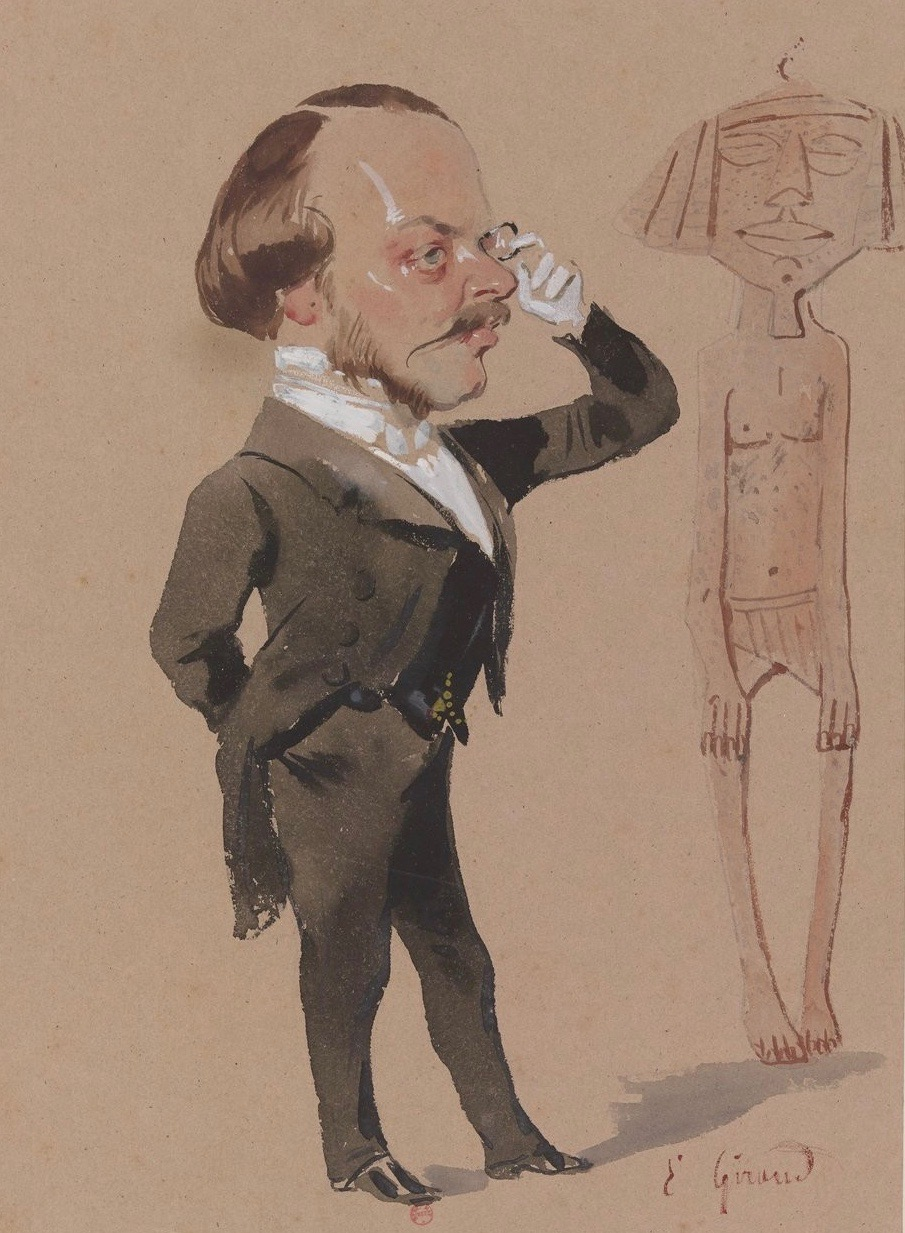
Emmanuel de Rougé, Egyptologist

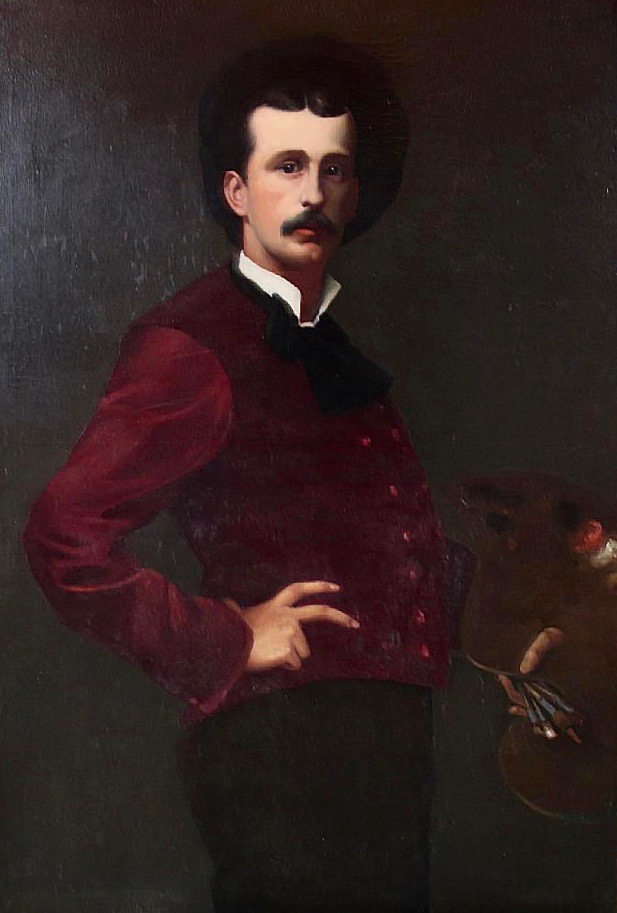
Robert de Rougé, officer and artist

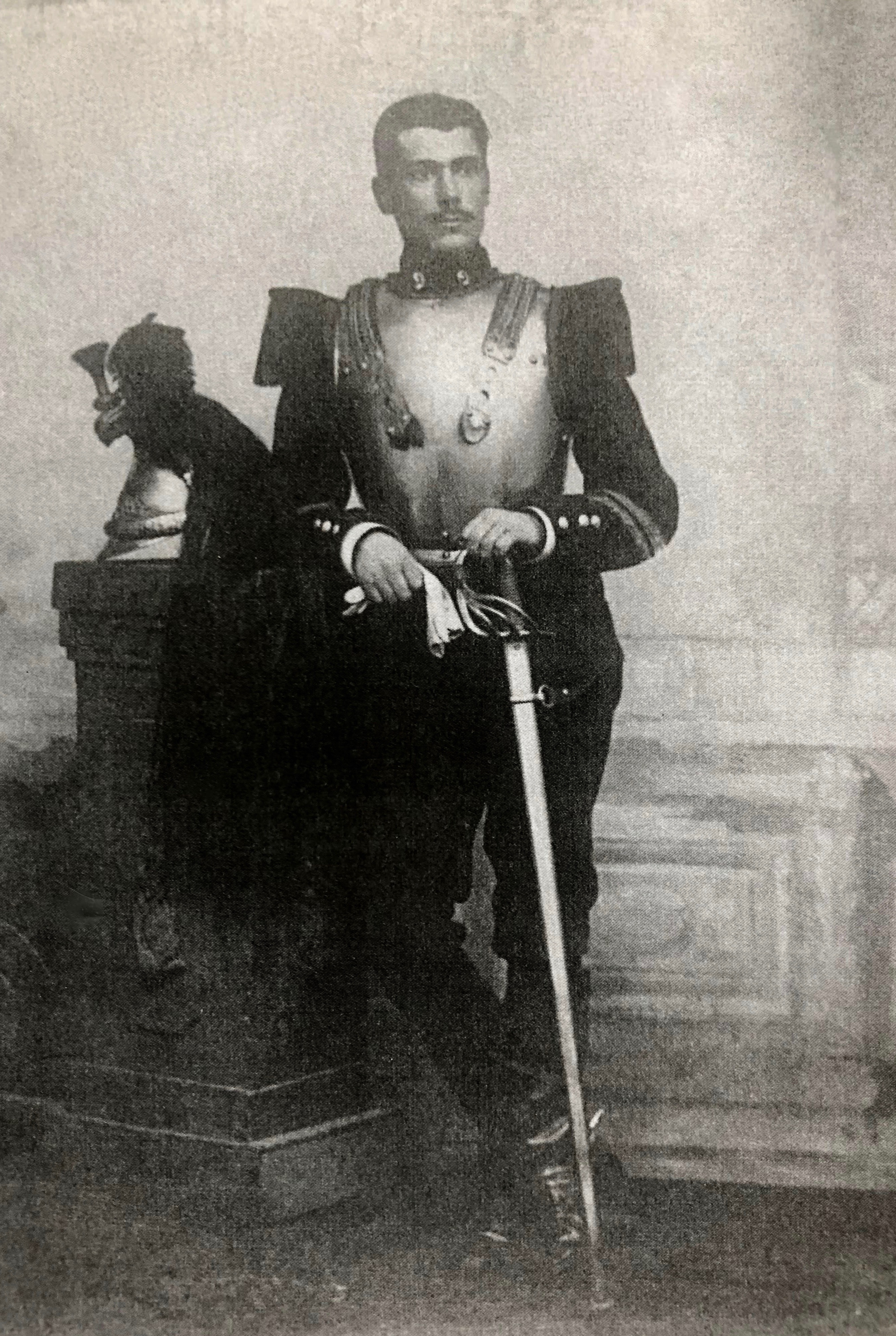
Count Bertrand de Rougé, killed in action in 1918

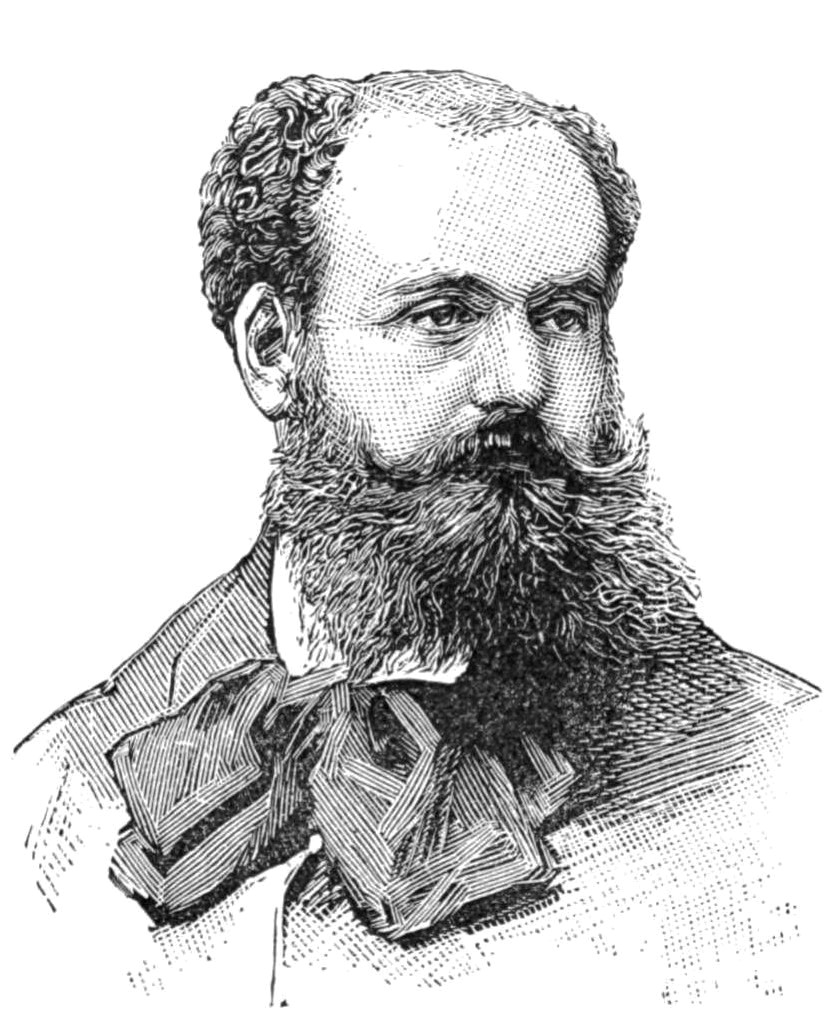
Count Arthur de Rougé, Spanish duke of Caylus, Baillif-grand-Cross of the Order of Malta

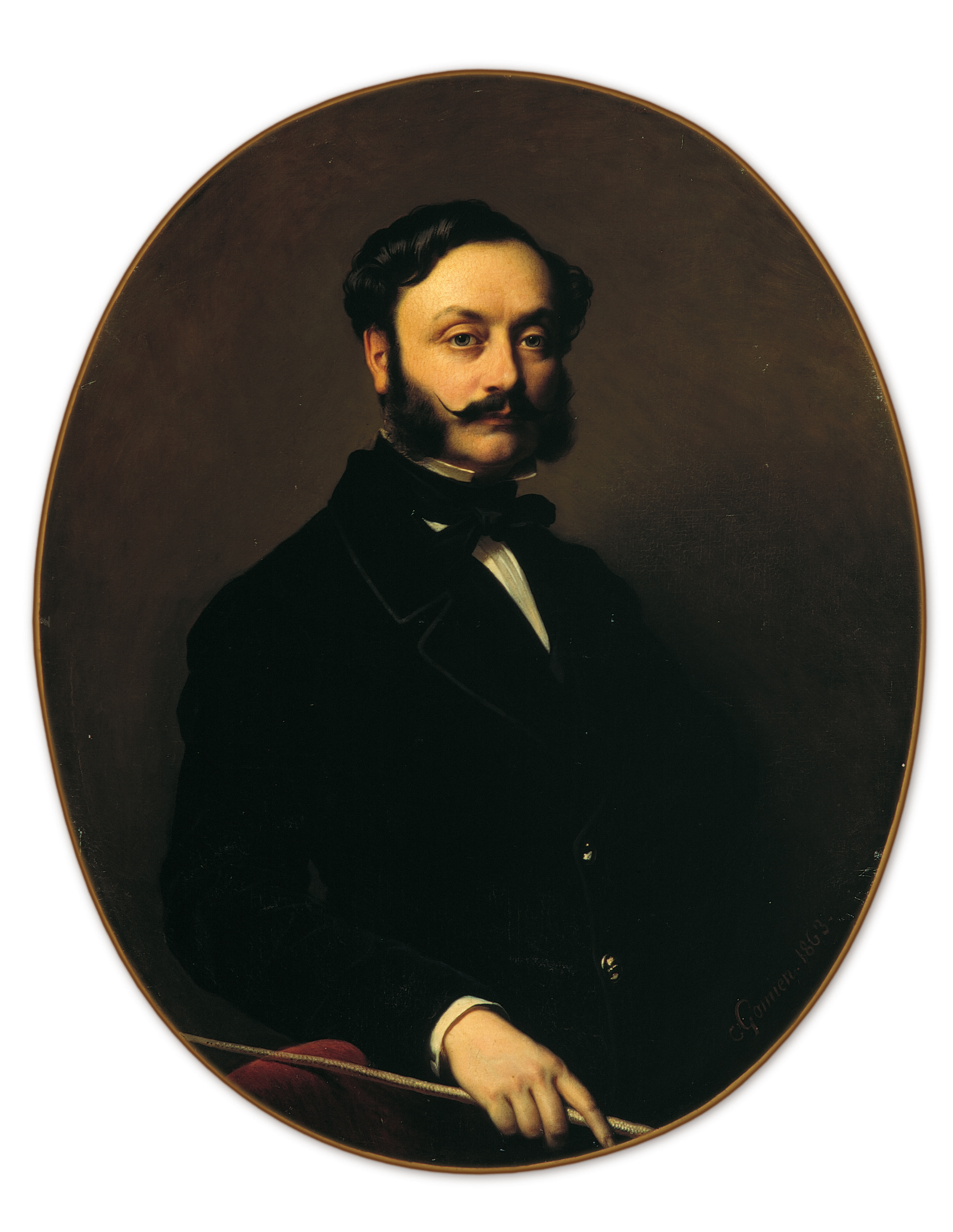
Adolphe de Rougé, by Gomien

== Lordships held by the de Rougé family ==
Les Rues, Le Plessis-Bellière, Chenillé-Changé, La Guerche (Anjou), Moreuil, Villers-aux-Érables, Guyencourt, Faÿ-lès-Nemours, Courtimont, Le Plessis-Courtimont, Roisson, Les Touches, Le Theil-de-Bretagne, Le Teilleul, La Mauvesière, Le Bignon, Sainte Scolace, Vauregnoust, Lorière, Marigné, Le Plessis-Gaudin, La Bellière, Le Bois, La Cour-du-Bois, Maigné, Chigné, Les Mortiers, Dissé, La Courtaillé, La Gauberdière, Les Feuges, Launay, Le Bouays, La Chapelle-Glain, Neuville, La Roche d'Iré, Cinq-Mars-la-Pile, Rouaibile, La Cornouaille, Pontcallec, Gastines, Valençon, Saint-Pierre-Montlimart, La Frébaudière, Langeron, Le May, Montfaucon, Vienne-le-Château, Cholet, Chemillé, Le Tremblay, La Cour de La Raye, Rostrenen, Kerjean, Hervillé, Moyencourt, Hardecourt-aux-bois, La Maison-Rouge, etc.

== Castles held by the de Rougé family ==
Baronville, Bois-Dauphin, Sablé-sur-Sarthe, Moreuil, Guyencourt-sur-Noye, Villers-aux-Érables, Coetmen, Tonquédec, Dinteville, La Maison-Rouge, Mesnil-Voysin, Bonaban, La Bellière, Le Charmel, La Guerche, Roche d'Iré, Courtimont, Faÿ-lès-Nemours, Pontcallec, Tremblay-sur-Mauldre, Rostrenen, Kerjean, Saint-Symphorien-des-Monts, Tressé, Les Essarts, Les Bouysses, etc.

== Notable alliances of the des Rues de Rougé family ==
d'Erbrée (1375), de Vrigné (1388), d'Orveaux (1421), du Boys (1447), d'Anès (1477), Foureau (1510), du Vieille (1554), de la Cour (1589), Jousseaume (1637), Petiteau (1683), de Chérité (1660), Prezeau de Guilletière (1700), de Coëtmen (1749), de Rochechouart de Mortemart (1777), de Crussol d'Uzès (1804), de Sainte-Maure-Montausier, Cadeau d'Acy, de Colbert-Chabanais (1880), Martel (1896), de Cardevac d'Havrincourt (1893), de Pastoret (1835), de Francqueville (1842), de Kérouartz (1881), de Pomereu d'Aligre (1931), de Maigret (1971), Gratry (2016), de Forbin d'Oppède (1809), de Tramecourt (1828), de Beauffort (1874), Budes de Guébriant (1839), de Nicolaï (1872), Robert de Lignerac de Caylus (1779), de La Porte de Riantz (1808), de Saint-George de Vérac (1833), de Rohan-Chabot (1880), de Ganay, Hutteau d'Origny (1869), Maigne de La Gravière (1872), de Lespinay (1850), Ferron de La Ferronnays (1888), de Charnières (1857), d'Oilliamson, de Malortie, etc.

== Titles ==
- Peer of France (1815 and 1827),
- Marquess Peer (1817 confirmed 1825),
- Baron Peer (1830),
- Duke of Caylus with Grandee of Spain (from 1893), extinct in 1954.

== Sources ==
- Jean-Baptiste Jullien de Courcelles, Histoire généalogique et héraldique des pairs de France, volume 8, page 220.
- Henri Jougla de Morenas, Grand Armorial de France, tome 4 page 74.
- Fernand de Saint-Simon, Dictionnaire de la noblesse française, 1975, page 87
- Borel d'Hauterive, André, Notice historique et généalogique sur la Maison de Rougé, Annuaire de la Noblesse de France, 1880.
- La Barre de Raillicourt, Dominique de, Les Titres authentiques de la noblesse en France, Editions Perrin, 2004.
