= Bonabes =

Bonabes is a surname. Notable people with the surname include:

- Alexis Bonabes, Marquess of Rougé Peer of France, (1778–1839), French military officer and statesman
- Bonabes, Count of Rougé (1891–1975), Secretary General of the Red Cross from 1936 to 1957
- Bonabes, Marquess of Rougé (1751–1783), French colonel, third Marquis de Rougé
- Bonabes IV de Rougé de Derval (1328–1377), knight from the House of Rougé, ambassador of the King of France in England

== See also ==
- Bon Abbas
