= Bonabes IV de Rougé de Derval =

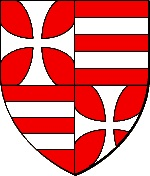
- Coat of arms
- Born: early 14th century (circa 1328)
- Died: 1377; La Meilleraye-de-Bretagne
- Occupation: ambassador of John II Le Bon King of France in England (in 1360)

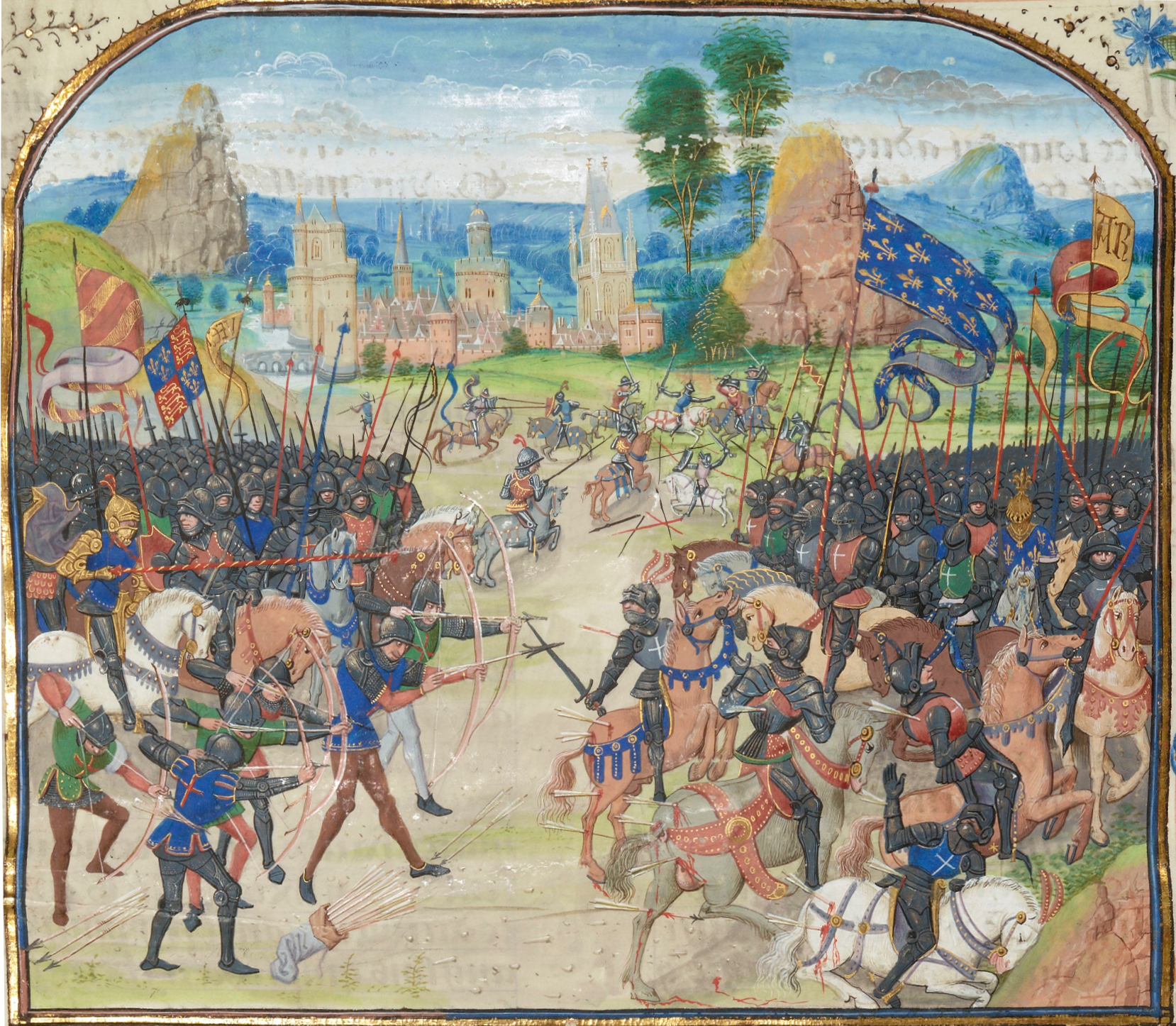
Battle of Poitiers (1356), where he was made prisoner (Chronicles of Jean Froissart, 15th century manuscript)

Bonabes IV de Rougé de Derval (c. 1328 – 1377) was a knight from the House of Rougé, Lord of Rougé and Derval, Viscount of La Guerche, Governor of South Brittany and of Redon, General of the Breton army and later of the French King's army, and ambassador of John II Le Bon King of France in England.

Born about 1328, he inherited the vast lands of his ancestors and began very early to fight in the war of succession to the Duchy of Brittany. His father, his uncle and his grandfather had been killed by English knights at La Roche-Derrien in 1347.

Bonabes de Rougé became the owner of part of the viscount of La Guerche, thanks to his marriage with Jeanne de l'Ile-Ogier.

He took part in the Battle of Mauron in 1352.

In 1356, he was prisoner at the Battle of Poitiers. · He was dispossessed of his Brittany property as an enemy of the Duke of Brittany, John of Montfort.

Bonabes IV negotiated the Treaty of Brétigny for Jean, King of France in 1360. The same king gave him the viscountcy of La Guerche in Touraine in 1361. He later became the hostage of King Edward III of England for the person of the French King Jean, and escaped from the Tower of London.

After his return, he took part in several battles and attempted to recapture his castle of Derval in 1373, occupied by the English knight Robert Knolles. Despite the help of Olivier de Clisson, the Dauphin of Auvergne, the Duke of Anjou, and Bertrand Du Guesclin, the assault on Derval was unsuccessful, and marked by the cruelty of Knolles and Clisson.

With Jeanne de l'Ile-Ogier they had four children : Jean de Rougé, Galhot, Jeanne and Eustache. His younger daughter, Jeanne de Rougé, married Geoffroy IV de la Tour Landry.

He had a child with Jeanne de Maillé, Lady of Clervaux (second marriage): Mahaut (wife of Briand de la Haie-Jouslain, lord of Moncontour).

He died in 1377. He is buried in the abbey of La Meilleraye-de-Bretagne.
