= Château de Tonquédec =

Castle in Côtes d'Armor, France

Coordinates: 48°40′36″N 3°24′42″W

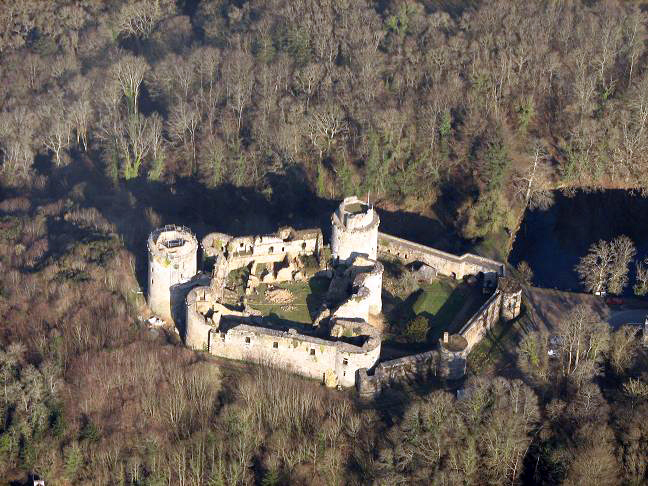
Aerial view. The inner ward is on the left, and the outer ward on the right.

The Château de Tonquédec is a castle in the commune of Tonquédec in the Côtes d'Armor département of France. It is one of the most visited monuments in the Côtes d'Armor.

The well-preserved ruins stand in forested countryside about 8.5 km (5.3 mi) south of Lannion. The present castle was built in the 15th century, on the site of an earlier 12th-century castle.

== History ==
Flag flown on top of the castle's main tower.

The 12th-century castle was the work of the Coëtmen-Penthièvre family. In the 14th century, Rolland II and Rolland III of Coëtmen, Viscounts of Tonquédec, supported the rebellion of Olivier de Clisson. The castle was therefore slighted by order of Jean IV, Duke of Brittany, in 1395, to prevent it being of use to the rebels.

Reconstruction began in 1406 by Rolland IV of Coëtmen. The castle subsequently changed owners several times, before becoming an artillery fortress in 1577. At this time, the owning family (Goyon de La Moussaye), being Protestant, was in disagreement with the king, Henri IV. During the War of the League, the castle was a refuge for Huguenots. It was finally dismantled around 1622 on the orders of the powerful Cardinal Richelieu.

The castle currently belongs to descendants of the original builders (House of Coëtmen-Penthièvre): Count and Countess Bertrand de Rougé. Since 1862, it has been listed as a monument historique by the French Ministry of Culture. The ruins are open to the public from April to October.

== Description ==
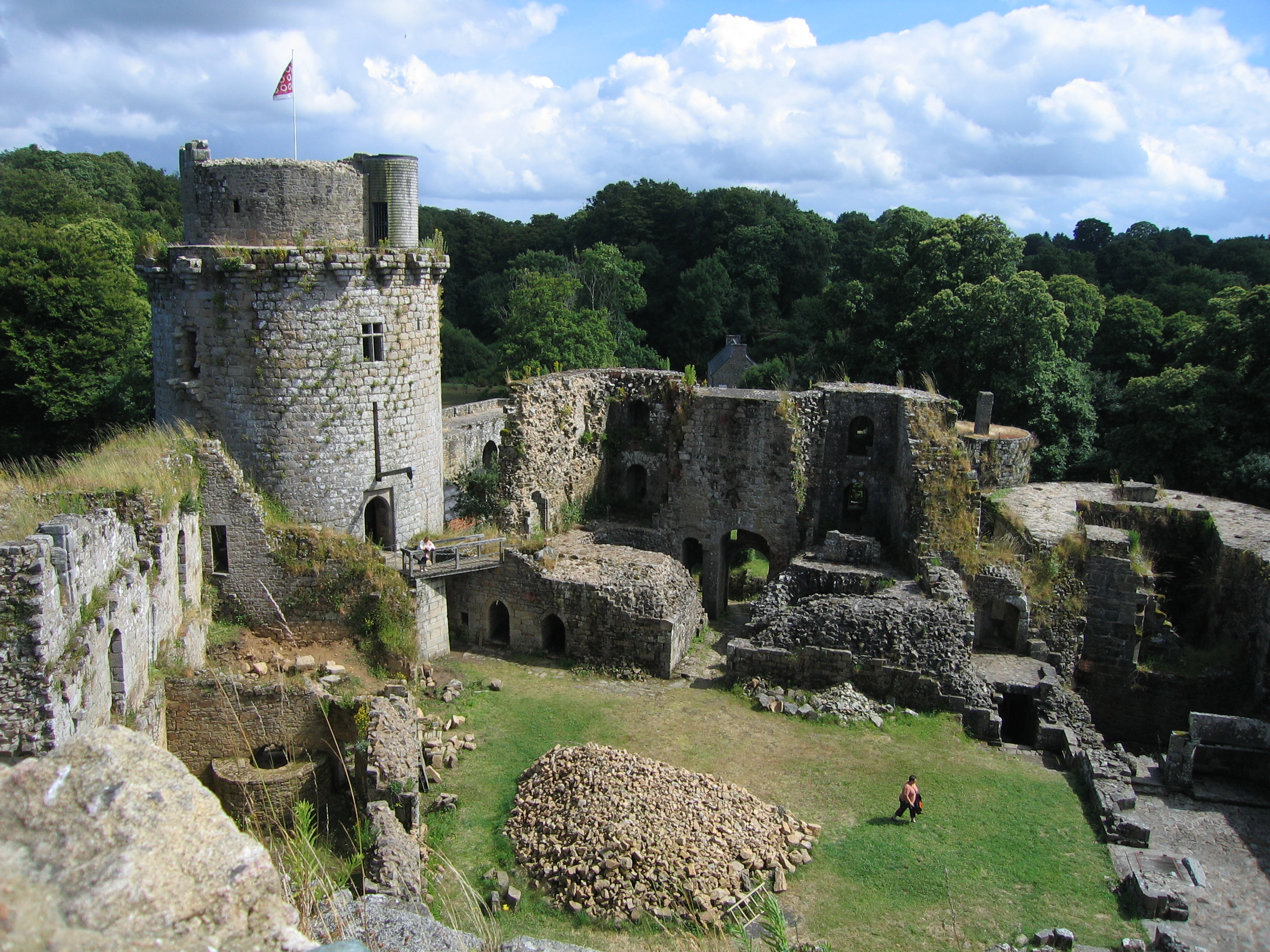
The inner ward, looking towards the rear of the gatehouse and Acigné Tower.

The castle sits atop a rocky spur, overlooking the valley of the Léguer. The entrance gate leads to an outer fortified courtyard or basse-cour. A twin-towered gatehouse leads to the inner courtyard, once protected by a moat and drawbridge. Unusually, there are two round keeps, both defended by drawbridges. One (the Acigné Tower) overlooks the gatehouse, while the other (the Rougé Tower), with walls 4 metres (13 ft) thick, stands detached from the curtain walls at the tip of the spur. The view from the top gives a good idea of the local countryside: "a wide, fertile and populous plateau is intersected by deep and wooded picturesque valleys".

== Gallery ==
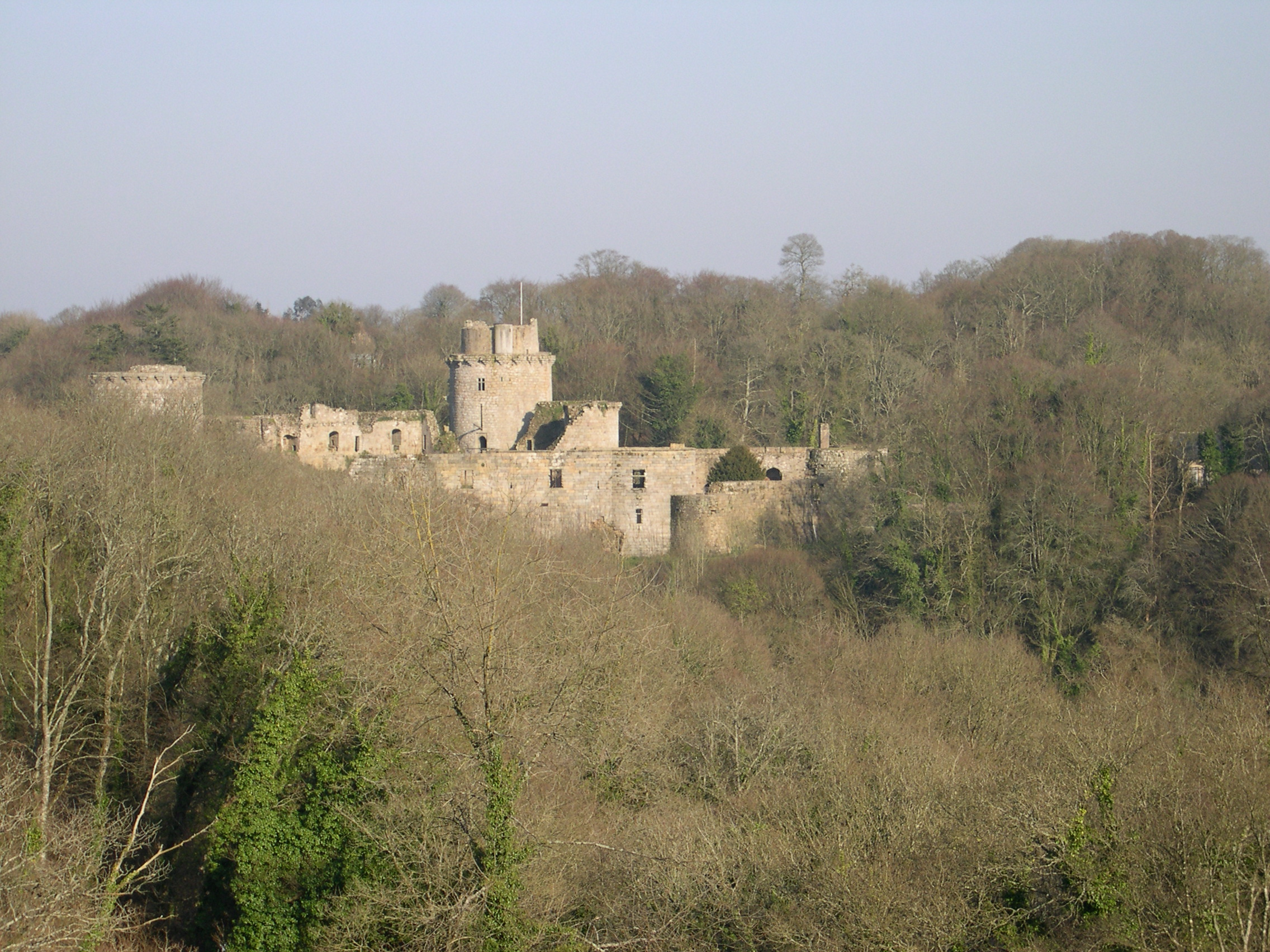
The castle from afar

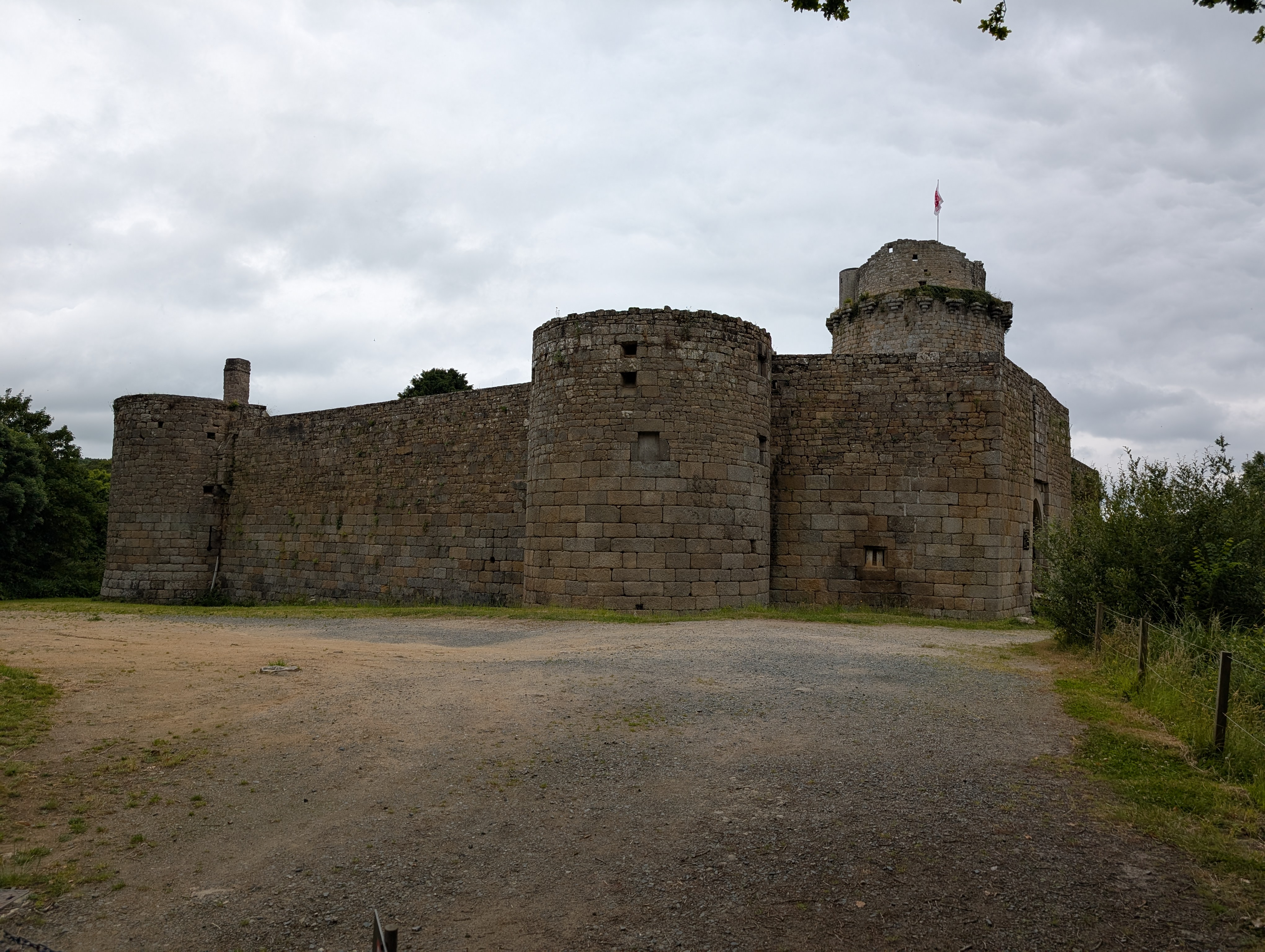
The outer curtain wall

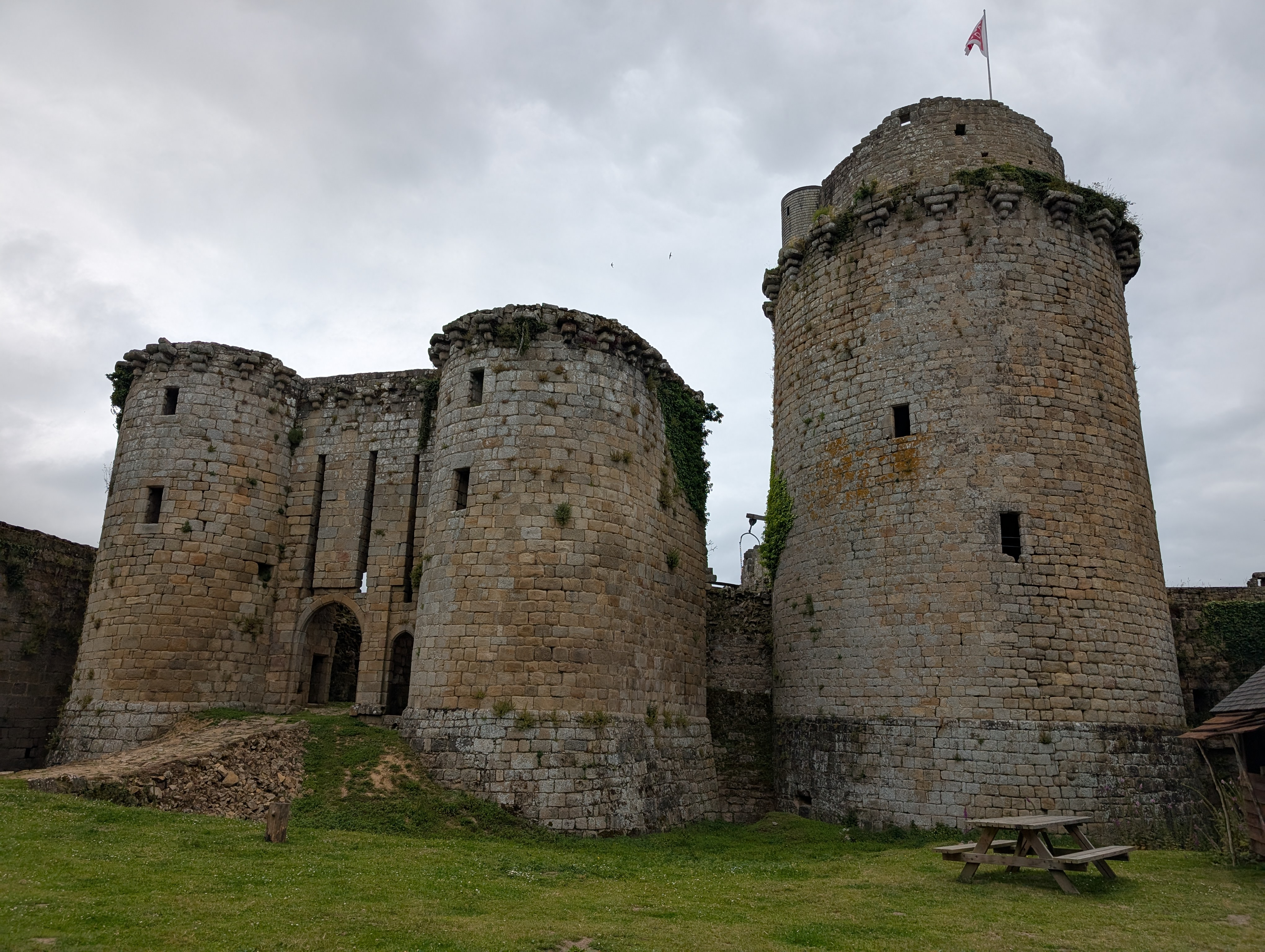
The inner gatehouse and Acingé Tower

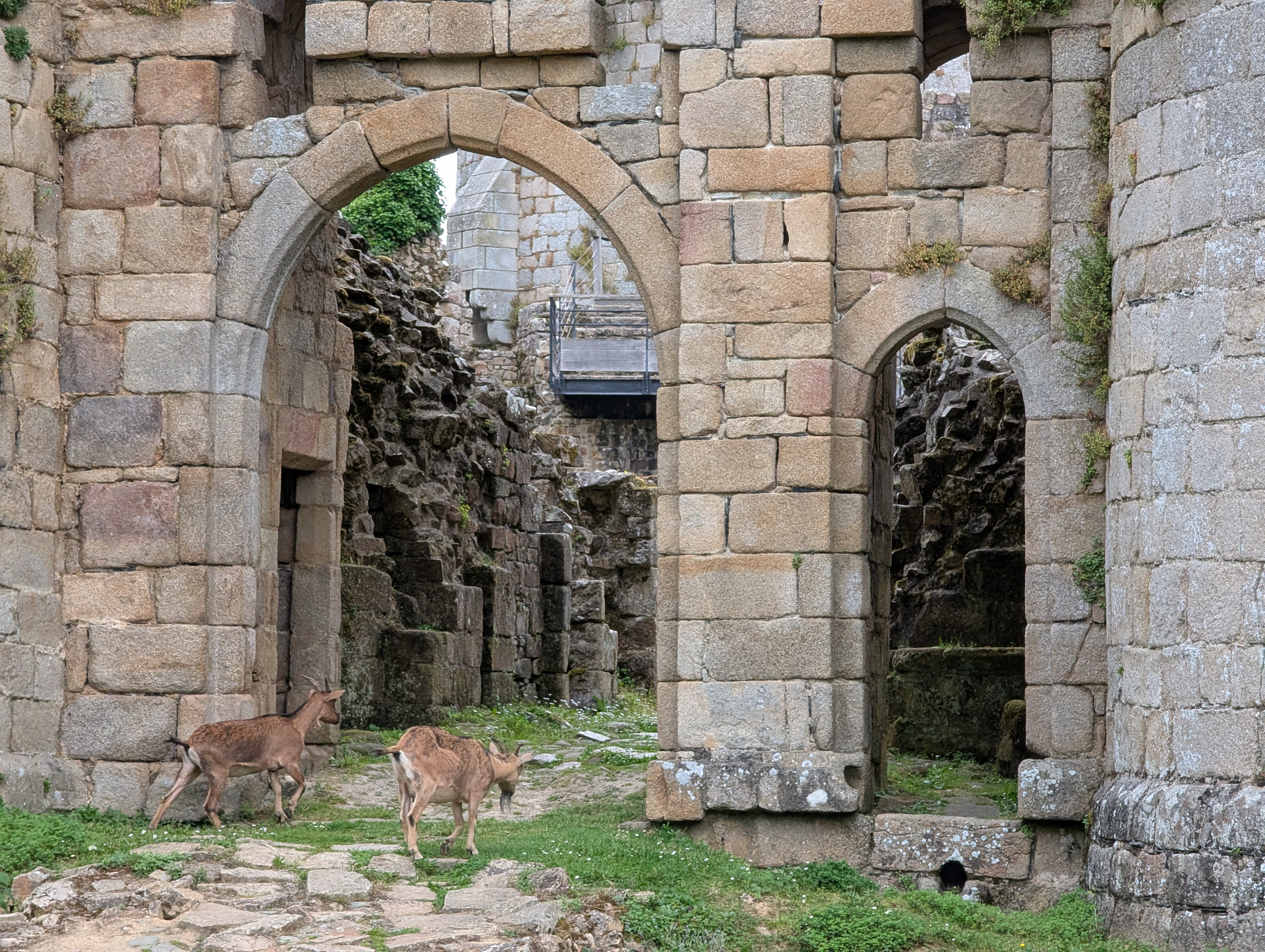
The castle gate

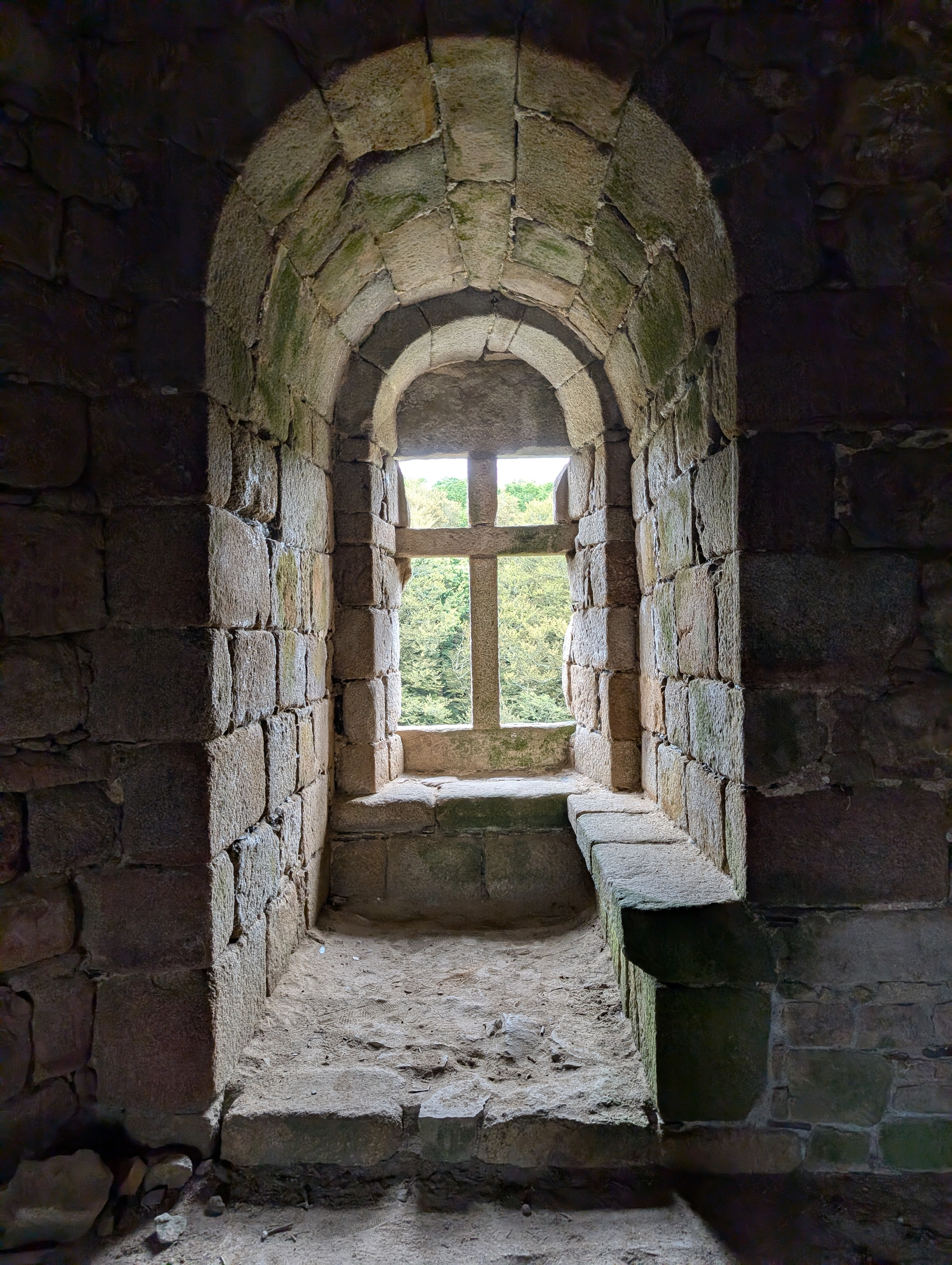
Window in the castle

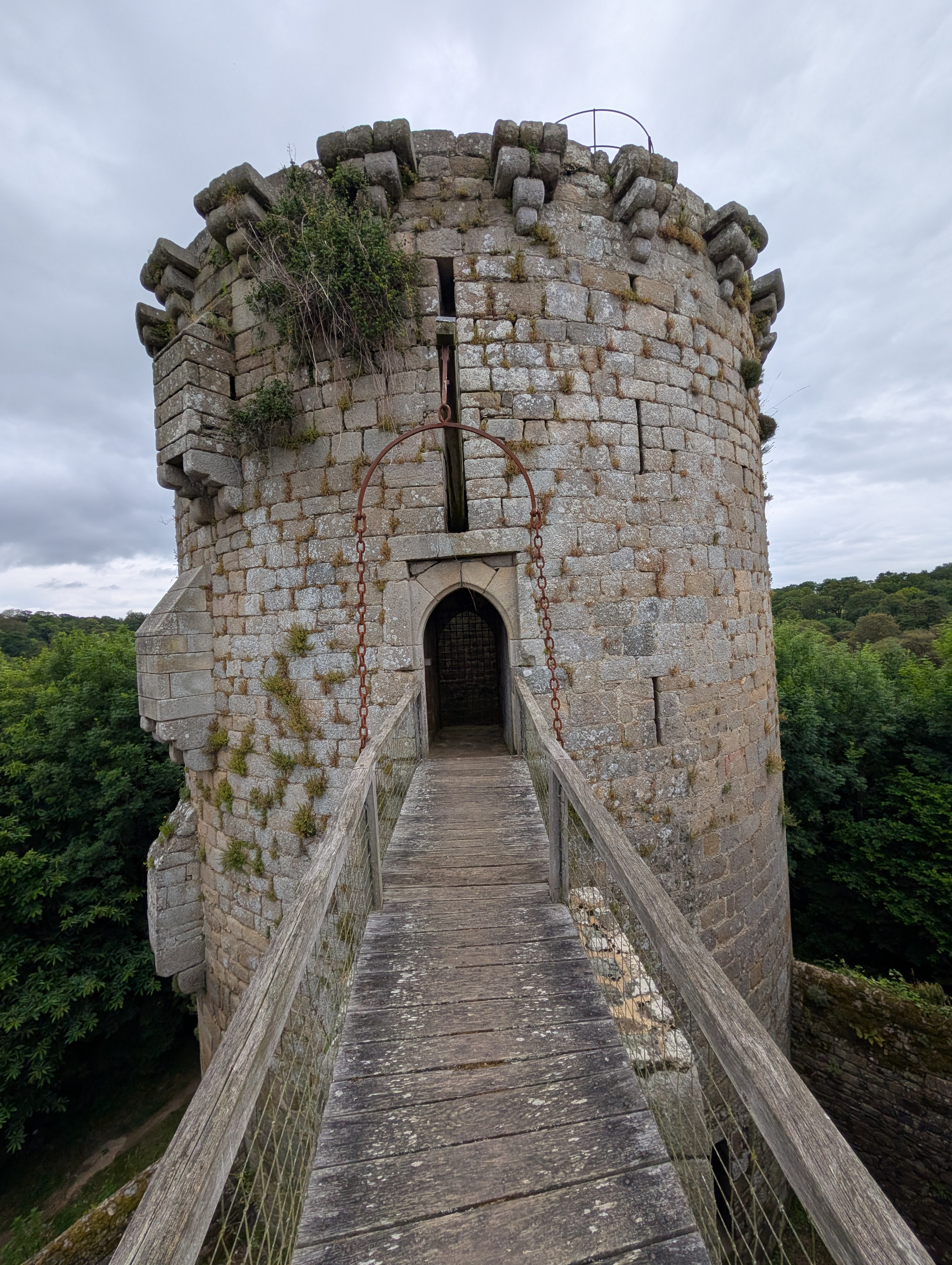
The drawbridge to the Rougé Tower

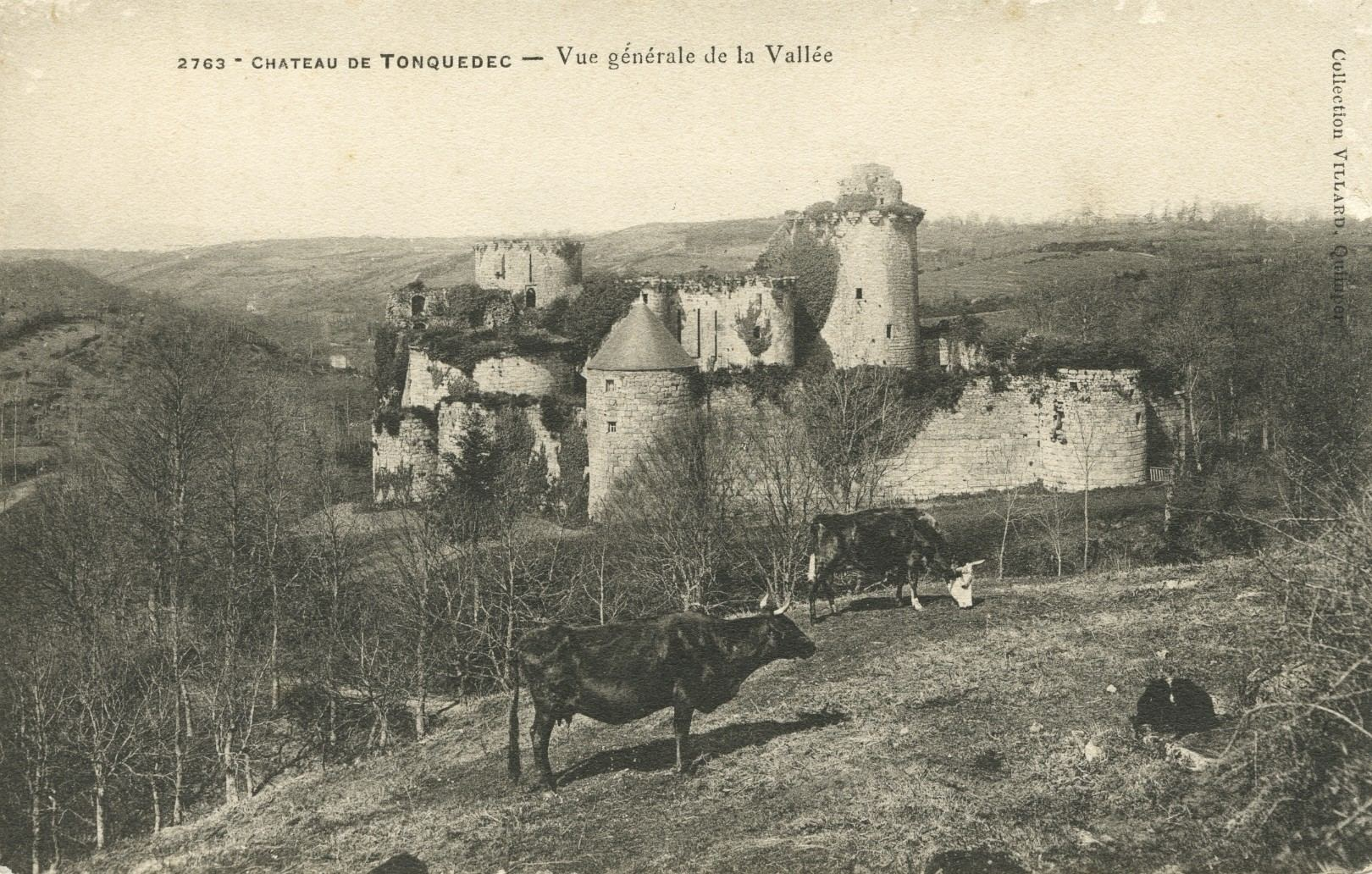
The ruins before consolidation

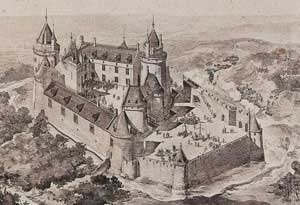
Reconstruction drawing of the castle

== See also ==
List of castles in France
