= Derval Castle =

Castle of Derval - Saint Clair Tower
- Derval, France
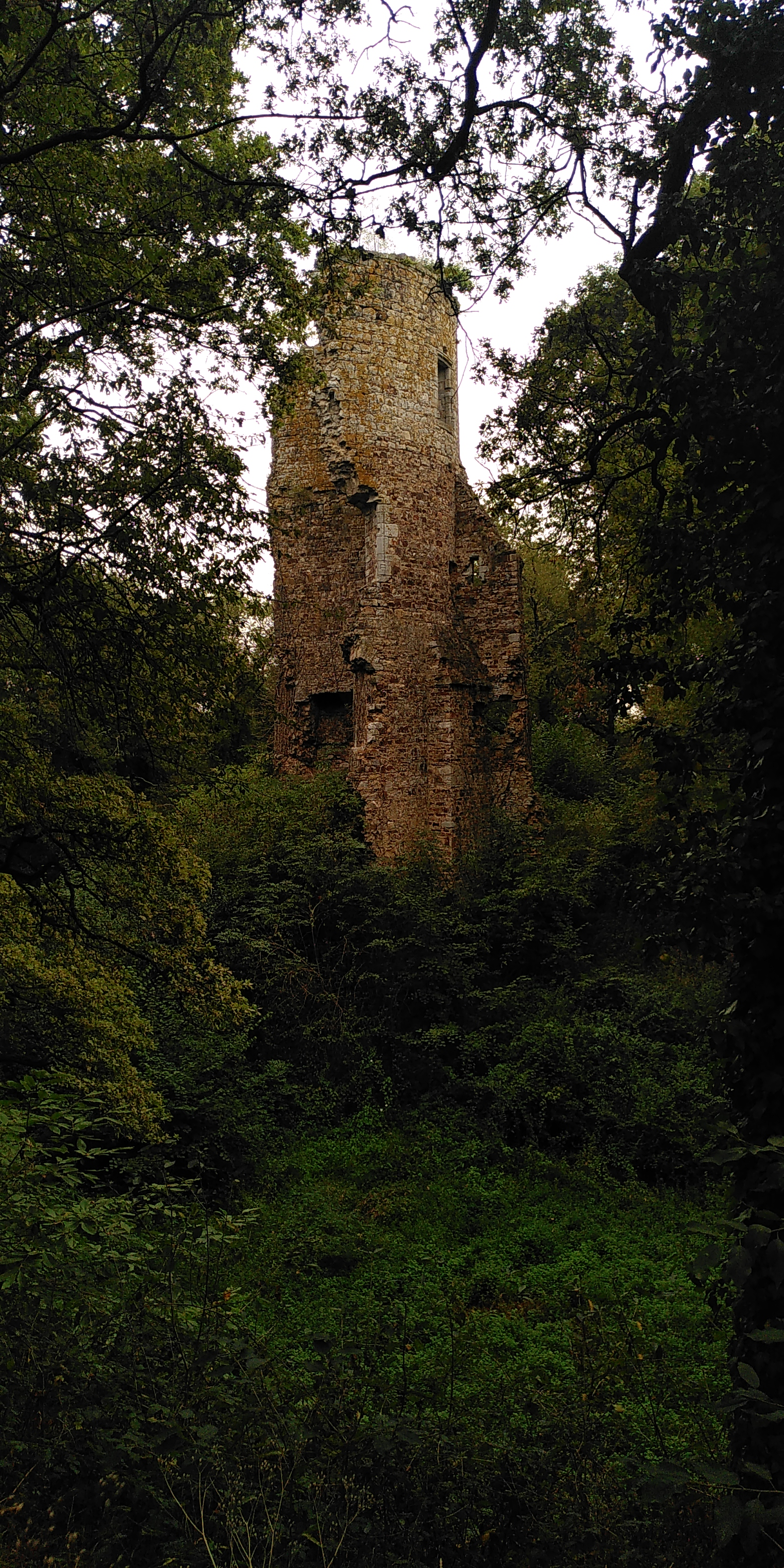
- Remains of the castle in 2023

Site information
- Owner: Bonabes IV Rougé de Derval (till 1365), Robert Knolles (1365 - 1380), Jean de Derval (1435 - 1482)
- Condition: ruins

Location
- Coordinates: 47.685837878199884°N 1.6588876457434938°W

Site history
- Demolished: 16th century

Derval Castle (also known as the Saint-Clair Tower) is an ancient fortified castle, the remains of which stand in the woods, 2.5 kilometres (1.6 mi) north-northeast of the town of Derval, in the French department of Loire-Atlantique (Pays de la Loire region).

== History ==
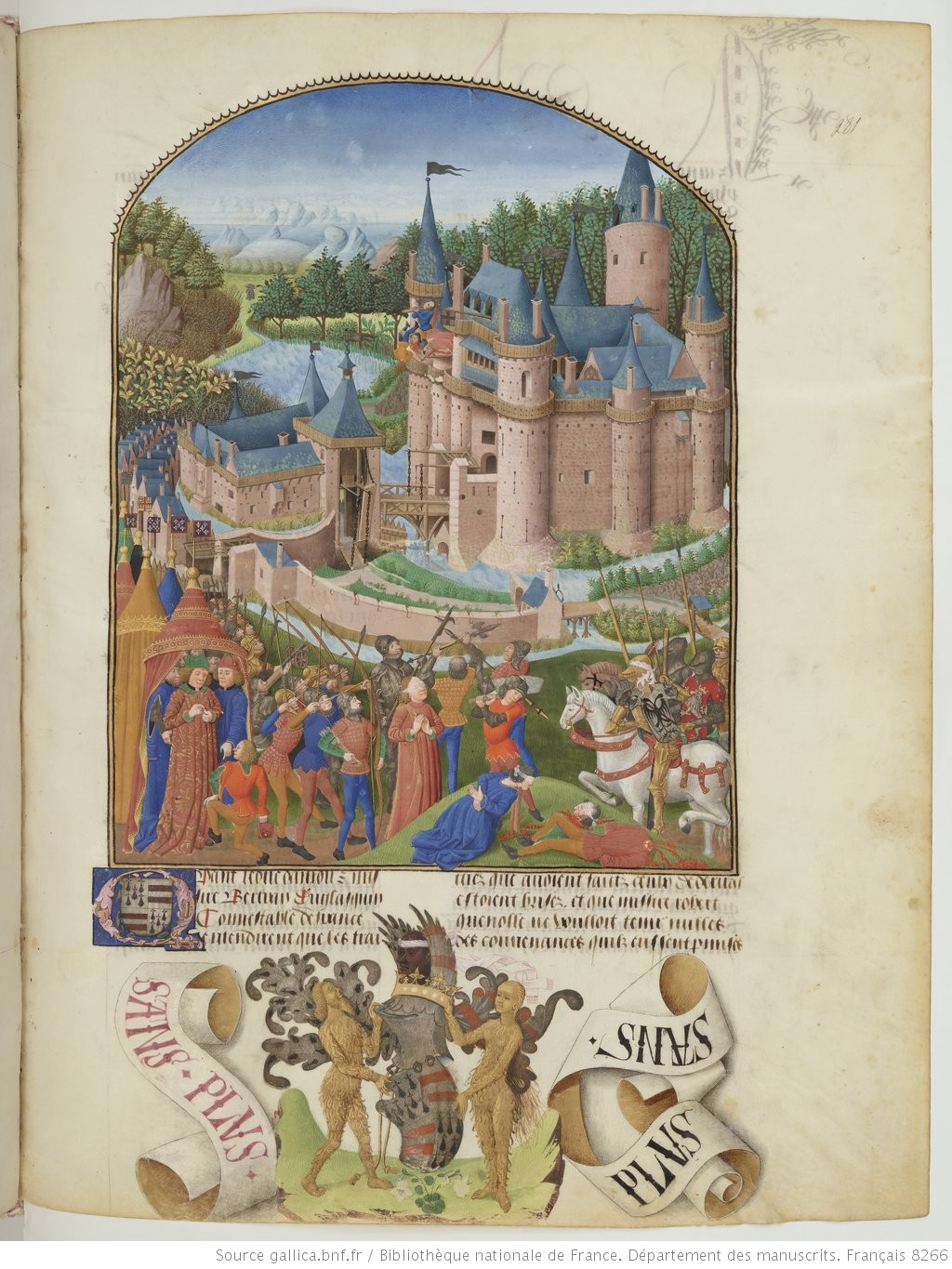
the siege of Derval Castle in the 14th century in Compillation des Cronicques et ystores des Bretons by Pierre Le Baud and the motto Sans plus of Jean de Derval who commissioned the writing of this book

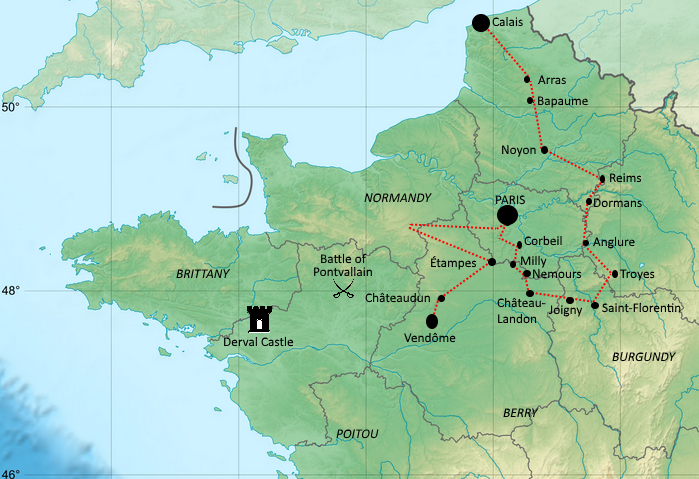
Robert Knolles' campaign in France

The siege of Derval in 1373, reported by Jean Froissart, is the first mention of the castle in historical sources. The earliest known depiction of Derval Castle as it appeared in the late Middle Ages is a late 15th-century miniature by Pierre Le Baud.

In the 14th century, the castle belonged to Bonabes IV de Rougé de Derval by inheritance. After the War of the Breton Succession, considered as an enemy of the Duke of Brittany, John of Montfort he was dispossessed of all his properties, included this castle, by the Treaty of Guérande (1365). Then, Robert Knolles, had been entrusted with the castle by John IV, Duke of Brittany, as a token of gratitude from the Duke.

In 1370, Robert Knolles was given a large grant of lands and money to raise an army to invade northern France, with 6,000 mounted men. When he arrived in the region between the rivers Loir and Loire, he had to cope with much criticism from his younger subordinate commanders such as Sir John Minsterworth who were spoiling for a fight. When it became known that French armies under the command of Bertrand du Guesclin were closing in on them, Knolles proposed to retreat into Brittany but most of the army refused. He therefore marched away with his own retinue, leaving the bulk of the army where they were, to be comprehensively defeated and slaughtered at the Battle of Pontvallain. Then, Knolles passed the winter in his castle at Derval. When Minsterworth fled to Brittany, probably to Knolles's castle at Derval, there, with Knolles, he spent the winter comfortably. Minsterworth decided to return his army to England early the following year, leaving Knolles in Derval. In 1373, the castle, was besieged by Bonabes IV de Rougé de Derval, Bertrand du Guesclin who left the siege of the Château de Brest under the command of Olivier de Clisson to rejoin the duke of Anjou at the siege of the Castle of Derval. It was a victory for Robert Knolles, who owned the castle till 1380. Robert Knolles was forced by John IV, Duke of Brittany to surrender the castle on this date, in exchange for which the Duke gave an annuity of 2,000 French livre.

During the 15th century, the castle was owned by the Derval family, notably Jean de Malestroit and his wife Hélène de Laval. Jean de Malestroit was lord of Chateaugiron. He inherited the castle in 1435 upon the death of his mother, Valence. Very close to the ducal court, he was named baron by Duke Pierre II in 1451. Derval was then elevated to the rank of barony and Jean de Malestroit became "Jean de Derval". The family motto "Sans plus" (Nothing more) can be understood as meaning "no one above us". He died in Châteaugiron on May 31, 1482, leaving no heir. He is buried at the Notre-Dame de la Vieuville Abbey in Epiniac, like his wife Hélène de Laval.

The castle was partially destroyed in 1593, during the French Wars of Religion by Henry IV of France.

Since 1992, the castle has been a property of the commune of Derval.

The site served as a stone quarry until the 20th century.

== Architecture ==
The main preserved building is the main tower (known as the Saint-Clair tower), 24 meters (79 ft) high, collapsed over half its diameter. The upper courtyard is preceded by a quadrangular lower courtyard. The whole is surrounded by a succession of moats still partially filled with water and terraced structures for defensive purposes, materializing several successive enclosures.

== Registration ==
The building was first partially registered as a historic monument by decree of July 16, 1925 by the French Ministry of Culture, to protect the Saint-Clair tower. In November 2021, protection was extended to the entire site, both built and unbuilt parts, in order to protect the surrounding area, the moats and the buried remains.

== See also ==
- Marches of Neustria
- History of Brittany

== Bibliography ==
- Lemée, Malo (2019). "Le château de Derval : état des connaissances et premiers apports de l'archéologie à l'étude du site castral" [Derval Castle: state of knowledge and first contributions of archaeology to the study of the castle site]. Bulletin de la Société Archéologique et Historique de Nantes et de Loire-Atlantique (in French) (154). Nantes: 75–106..
