= Pierre-François, Marquess of Rougé =

Pierre-François, Marquis de Rougé
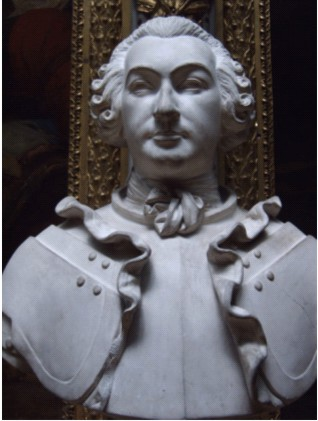
- Bust of the Marquis de Rougé in Versailles
- Born: 1702
- Died: 15 July 1761 (aged 58–59) Soest, Germany
- Allegiance: Kingdom of France
- Rank: Lieutenant General
- Conflicts: War of the Polish Succession; Siege of Kehl; Siege of Philippsburg; War of the Austrian Succession; Seven Years' War; Battle of Rossbach; Battle of Villinghausen
- Awards: Commandeur de l'ordre royal et militaire de Saint-Louis
- Spouses: Julie de Coëtmen, marquise de Rougé
- Other work: Convention of Brandebourg, Signer

Pierre-François, Marquis de Rougé (1702–1761) was a French nobleman and general of the French armies, member of the House of Rougé. He was most famous for having signed the war treaty "Convention de Brandenburg" in the name of King Louis XV.

== Military career ==
He fought in the War of the Polish Succession at the 1733 Siege of Kehl and the 1734 Siege of Philippsburg. He became a colonel in the War of the Austrian Succession. During the Seven Years' War he was taken prisoner and exchanged at the Battle of Rossbach in 1757, and fought against Prussia in Corbach and Kassel.

On 7 September 1759, he signed a military treaty known later as the "Convention de Brandebourg". This agreement, concluded with the representative of the Prussian armies, General Major Baron Johann Jobst Heinrich von Buddenbrock, stipulated that the hospitals, wounded soldiers and lazarets as well as the medical personnel would not be considered as fighting units. A century later Henry Dunant, founder of the Red Cross, described this as the first "Red Cross treaty" when he requested funds from the Emperor Napoleon III.

He was fatally wounded at the Battle of Villinghausen, fought on 15 and 16 July 1761.

His bust is in the Galerie des Batailles at the château de Versailles.

== Family ==
Son of Pierre III, marquis de Rougé and of Jeanne Prézeau de la Guilletière. On 7 June 1749, he married Marie Claude Jeanne Julie de Coetmen; they had five children:

- Catherine de Rougé (1750–1784)
- Bonabes Alexis, marquis de Rougé (1751–1783)
- Marie de Rougé (1753)
- François Pierre Olivier de Rougé, comte de Rougé et du Plessis-Bellière, marquis du Faÿ (1756–1816)
- Marie-Avoie de Rougé (1759-1759)
