= Alexis Bonabes, Marquess of Rougé =

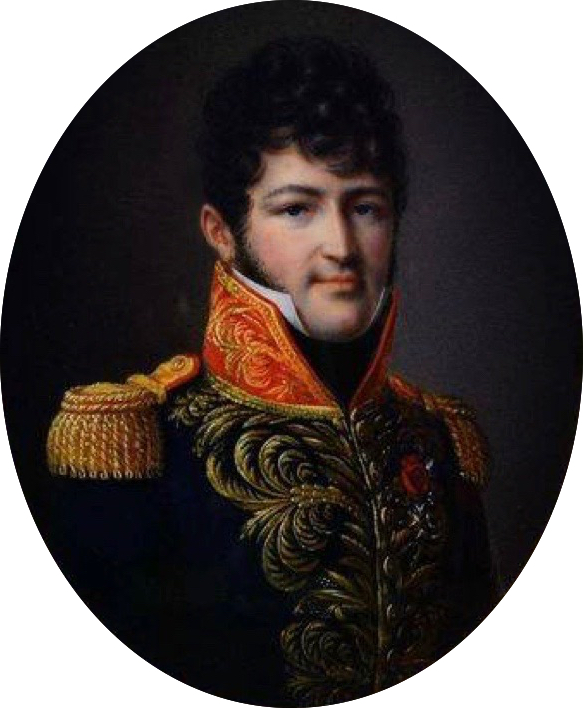
Bonabes Louis Victurnien Alexis1 de Rougé

Bonabes Louis Victurnien, Marquess of Rougé, Peer of France, (31 January 1778 in Paris – 29 March 1839 in Paris) was a French military officer and statesman.

== Early life ==
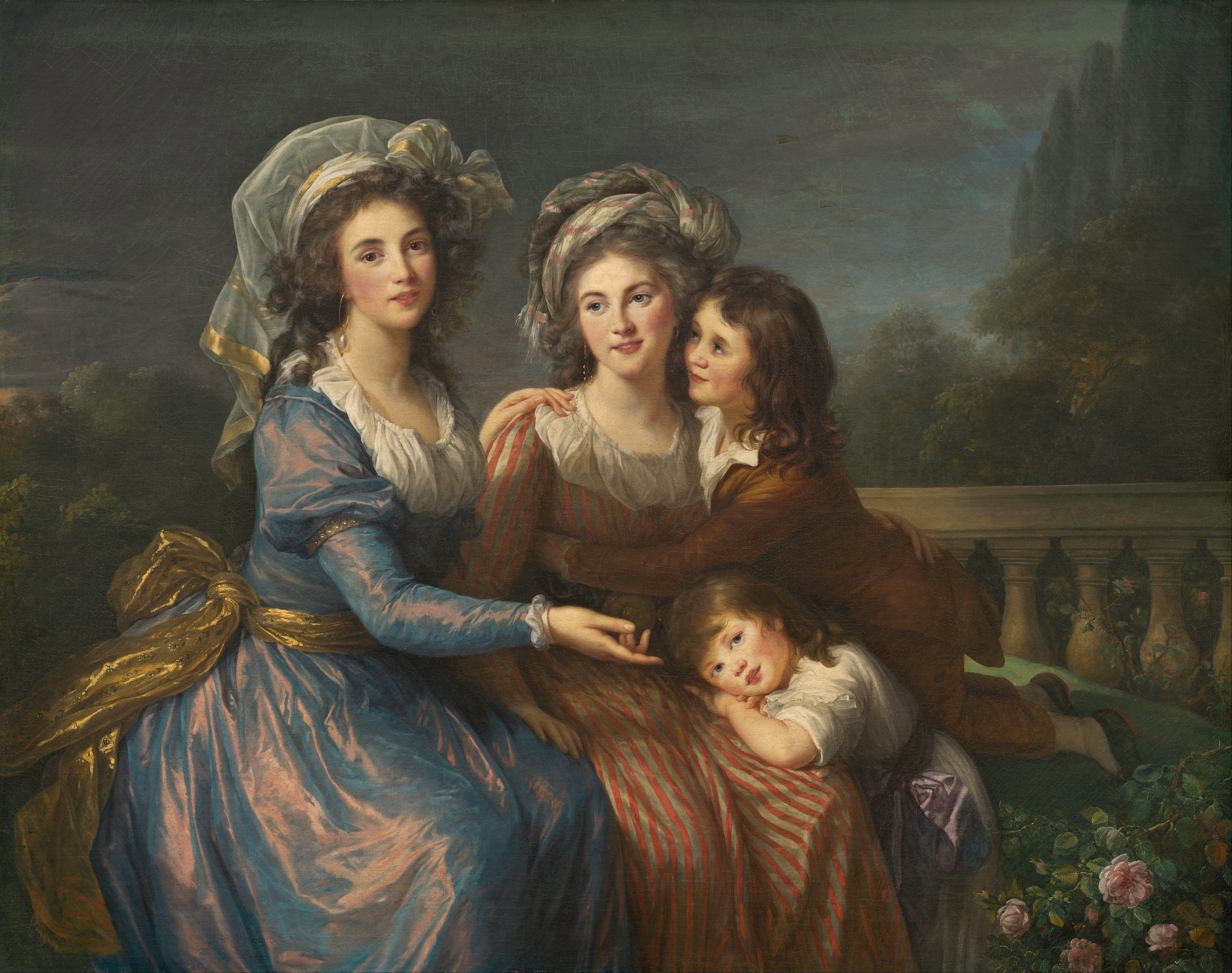
Portrait of his aunt (the Marquise de Pezay), his mother (the Marquise de Rougé), and future Marquis and, his brother (Adrien), by Elisabeth-Louise Vigée Le Brun, 1787

Born on 31 January 1778 in Paris, he was the son of Bonabes Alexis, Marquess of Rougé, and Natalie Victurnienne, Marchioness of Rougé. His younger brother was Adrien, Count of Rougé.

== Career ==
In 1794, he entered the service of Austria as aide-de-camp to the Prince von Waldeck. The same year he joined the Mortemart regiment (led by his uncle the Duke de Mortemart of the French émigré army).

With the restoration of the House of Bourbon, he was appointed Adjutant-Major of the King's Swiss Guards, and he received the cross of the military order of Saint Louis. During the Hundred Days, he followed Louis XVIII into exile; as a reward, he was later promoted to the rank of Lieutenant Commander of the French Column of the Royal Swiss. In 1815, he was raised to the Hereditary Peerage with the title of Marquis. He later refused to swear allegiance to Louis Philippe and resigned his commission in 1830.

== Personal life ==
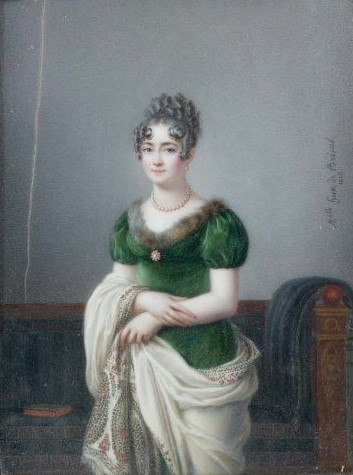
Portrait of his wife, Célestine, 1818

In April 1804, he married Alexandrine Célestine Zoé Emmanuelle Thimarette de Crussol d'Uzes (1785–1866), daughter of Emmanuel de Crussol, 10th Duke of Uzès, premier Peer of France, and of Amable Emilie de Châtillon. Together, they had six children:

- Aldéric, Comte de Rougé (1805–1805)
- Théodorite, Marquis de Rougé (1806–1864)
- Victurnienne de Rougé (1806–1879)
- Hervé de Rougé, Marquis du Plessis-Bellière (1809–1888)
- Louis-Bonabes, Comte de Rougé (1813–1880)
- Marie-Thérèse de Rougé (1817–1841)

He died on March 29, 1838, at the age of sixty.
