= Adrien de Rougé =

French statesman, soldier (1782–1838)

Adrien Gabriel Victurnien de Rougé (2 July 1782 in Everly – 16 June 1838 in Guyencourt), was a French statesman, soldier, and Peer of France member of the House of Rougé.

Adrien was a son of Bonabes, Marquis de Rougé and his wife Natalie Victurnienne. He served under the Comte d'Artois, later King Charles X, in the Army of the Princes, first as a second lieutenant in the Infantry, then in 1800 as a "chasseur noble" in the Mortemart regiment. He served then as an officer of the King's Mousquetaires in 1814.

From 1815 to 1823, he was a member of the Chamber of Deputies, representing the Departement of the Somme. In 1816, Charles X appointed him to the Peerage with the title of Comte. For a time he commanded one of the four subdivisions of the army stationed in Paris. He became the leader of the Knights of the Faith, a very powerful secret ultra conservative organisation. He refused his allegiance to the government of King Louis Philippe.

== Family ==
By his wife, Caroline de Forbin d'Oppède (1789-1872), married on 18 September 1809, in Arnouville, they had four children:

- Félix, Comte de Rougé 1810–1893
- Armel, Comte de Rougé 1813–1898
- Marie de Rougé 1816–1860
- Delphine de Rougé 1820–1852.
