= Bonabes, Count of Rougé =

Secretary General of the Red Cross from 1936 to 1957

Bonabes, Comte de Rougé (4 June 1891 Les Essarts, Vendée – 25 October 1975 Bern) was a member of the French noble de Rougé Family, and served as the Secretary General of the Red Cross from 1936 to 1957.

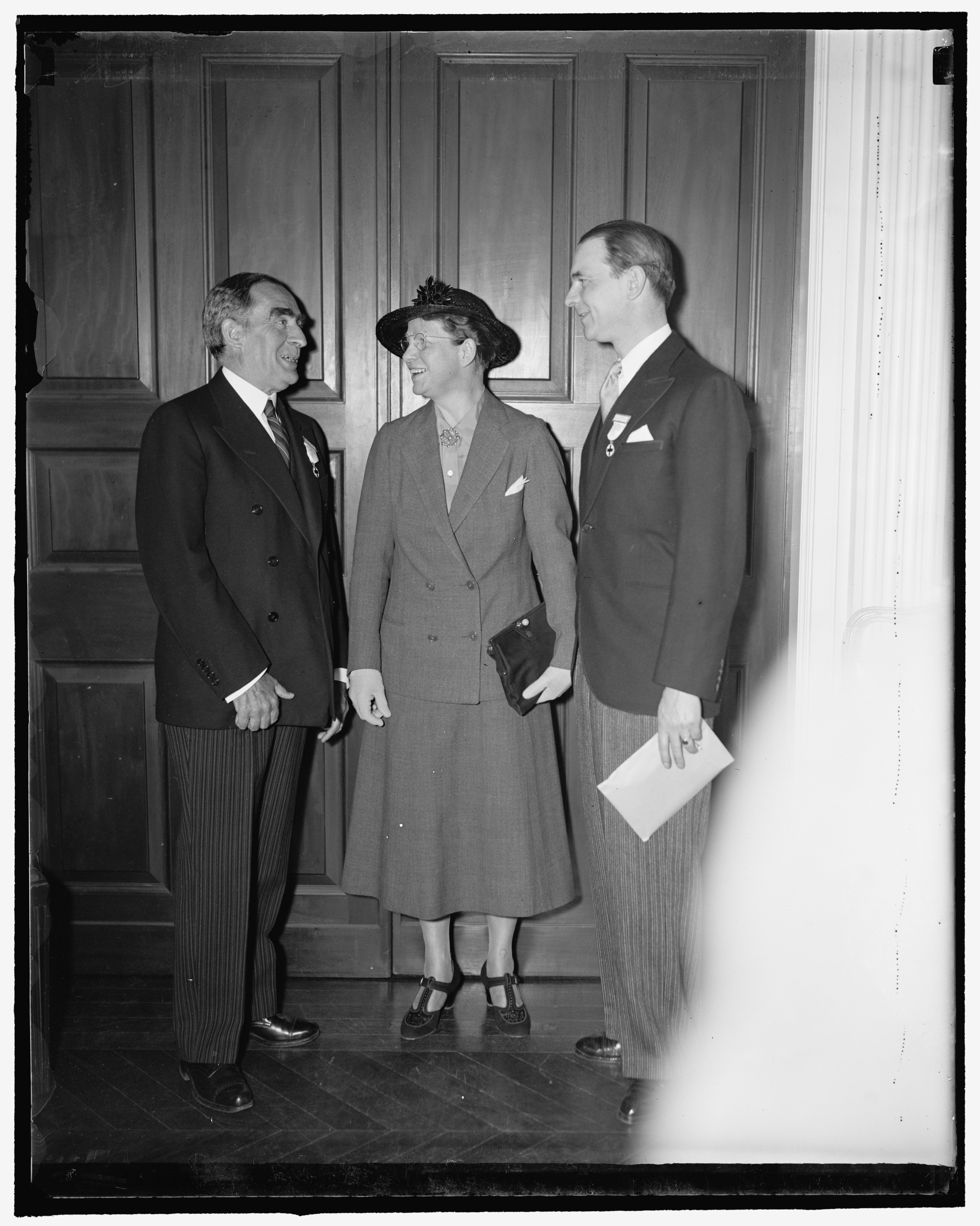
Bonabes (far right) in 1937

== Quotation ==
- "Peace is more than the absence of war."
