= Battle of Villinghausen =

1761 battle

Coordinates: 51°39′44″N 7°59′43″E

- Part of the Seven Years' War
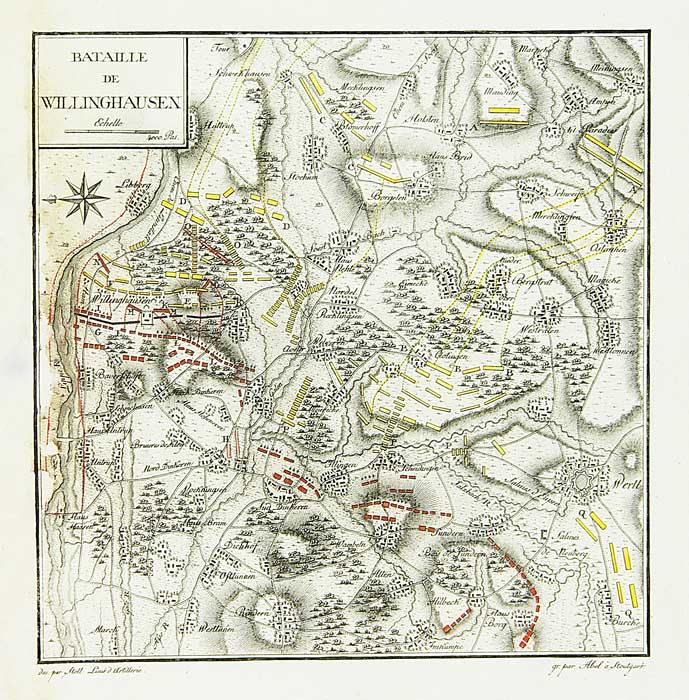
- Bataille de Willinghausen, print, Frankfurt 1789
Date	15–16 July 1761
Location	Vellinghausen, Prince-Bishopric of Paderborn
Result	Allied victory

Belligerents
Great Britain (Province of Hanover) Hanover; Hesse-Kassel; Brunswick-Wolfenbüttel; Prussia	France

Commanders and leaders
(Province of Hanover) Duke Ferdinand of Brunswick	Duc de Broglie; Prince de Soubise

Strength
~65,000	~90,000

Casualties and losses
1,400	5,000 (Broglie 4,700, Soubise 300)

The Battle of Villinghausen (or Vellinghausen, also known as the Battle of Kirchdenkern), took place during the Seven Years' War fought on the 15th and 16 July 1761 in the western area of present-day Germany, between a large French army and an Anglo-German force led by Prince Ferdinand of Brunswick. The French commanders failed to coordinate their actions and suffered defeat.

== Background ==
Two French armies, under two Marshals, Duc de Broglie and Prince de Soubise, met up in July 1761, intending to force Prince Ferdinand out of Lippstadt, an important town. Allied reinforcements under General Spörcken arrived bringing Ferdinand's forces up to 65,000 while the combined French armies numbered around 90,000.

== Battle ==
The Anglo-German forces lined up along a series of hills, with their left anchored by the Lippe River (in the north), and the Ahse River in their centre. The French army advanced on 15 July, and Broglie's troops in the north made progress against German troops under Wutginau. However, British troops under Granby just south of Wutginau held their ground and the French assault stalled. Reinforcements for both sides arrived that night and Ferdinand strengthened his left at the expense of his right.

The next morning, Broglie continued his attack on the Allied left, expecting Soubise to attack the weakened Allied right. However, Soubise only ordered a few small actions against the right, due in part that both French commanders were the same rank and reluctant to take orders from the other. Allied reinforcements under Wolff soon arrived along the Lippe River and attacked the French flank, halting Broglie's attack and forcing his men to withdraw. By about noon, the French were in full retreat and the battle was over.

== Aftermath ==
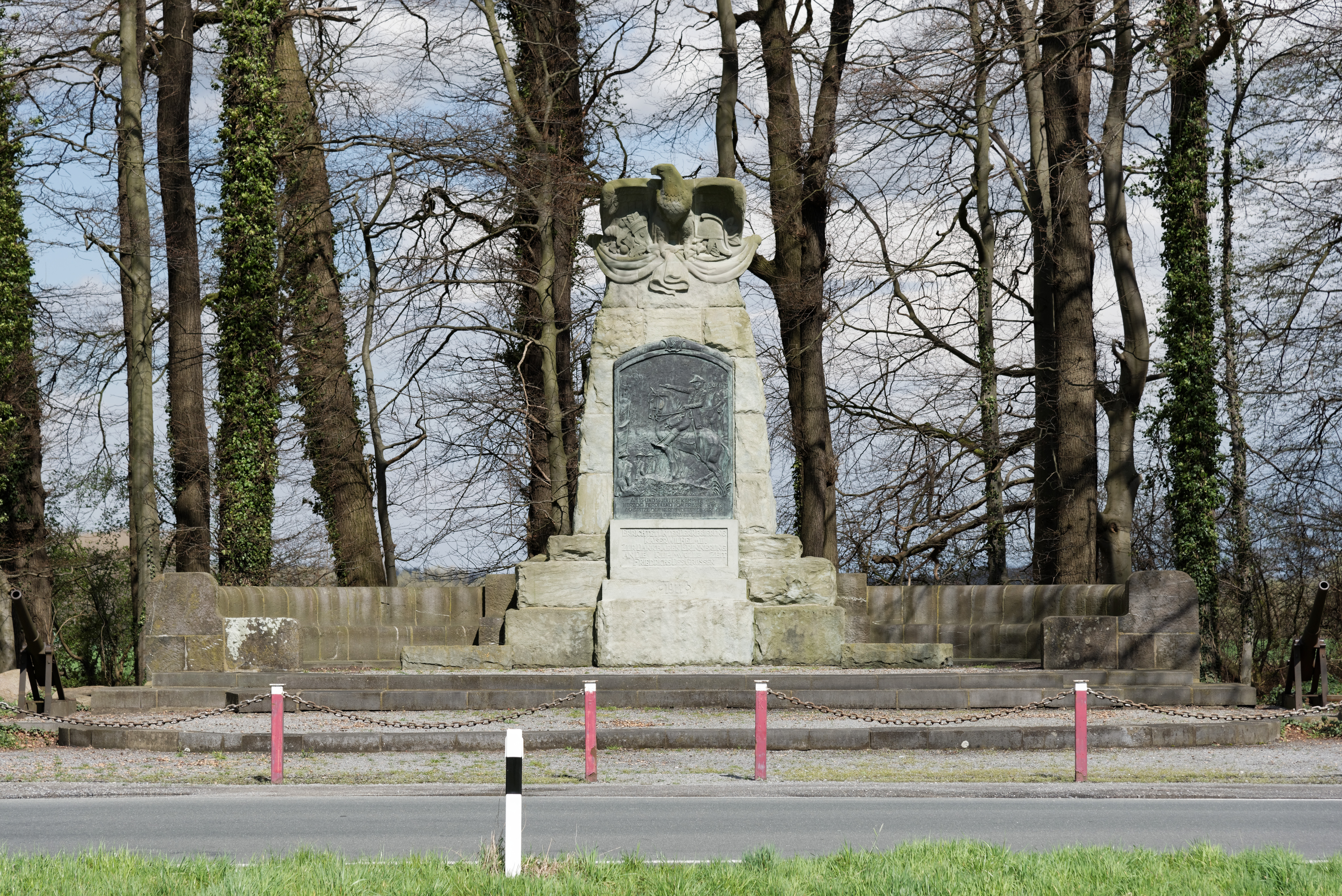
Monument to the battle

News of the battle provoked euphoria in Britain, and led William Pitt to take a much tougher line in the ongoing peace negotiations with France. Despite the defeat the French still had a significant superiority in numbers and continued their offensive, although the two armies split again and operated independently. Despite further attempts to push an offensive strategy in Germany, the French were pushed back and finished the war in 1762 having lost the strategic post of Cassel. The Treaty of Paris led France to evacuate the remaining German territory it had occupied during the war.

== Other notable officers and regiments ==
- Lieutenant General John Manners, Marquess of Granby, 21st Regiment of (Light) Dragoons (Royal Forresters)
- Lieutenant-Colonel (brevet) Charles Cornwallis, 2nd Earl Cornwallis (later 1st Marquess Cornwallis), 12th Regiment of Foot
- Major General George Townshend, 4th Viscount Townshend (later 1st Marquess Townshend), possibly the 24th Regiment of Foot
- Pierre-François, Marquess of Rougé, lieutenant-general, who died in action at this Battle, such as his cousin Louis-Ferdinand-Joseph de Croÿ, the 6th Duke of Croÿ-Havré (fr).

== See also ==
- Great Britain in the Seven Years War
- France in the Seven Years War

== Bibliography ==
- Szabo, Franz A.J. The Seven Years War in Europe, 1757-1763. Pearson, 2008.

== Sources ==
- Military History Encyclopedia
- BritishBattles.com
