= Tonquédec =

Tonquédec Tonkedeg
- Commune
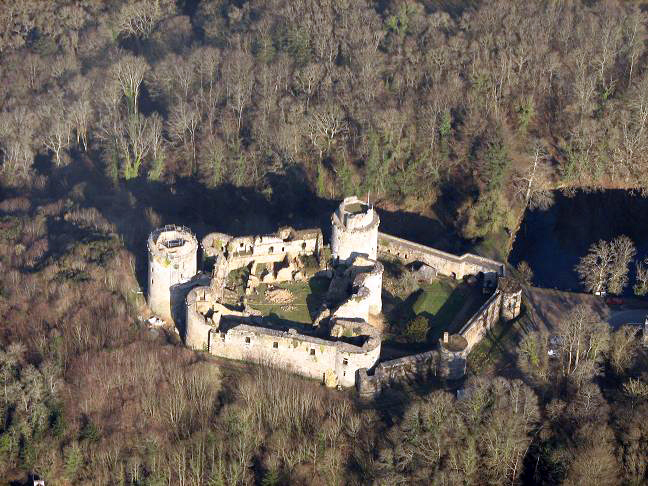
- Chateau

- Coat of arms
- Location of Tonquédec
- Location within France Location within Brittany
- Coordinates: 48°40′12″N 3°23′38″W
- Country: France
- Region: Brittany
- Department: Côtes-d'Armor
- Arrondissement: Lannion
- Canton: Bégard
- Intercommunality: Lannion-Trégor Communauté

Government
  - Mayor (2020–2026): Joël Philippe
- Area^{1}: 18.01 km^{2} (6.95 sq mi)
- Highest elevation: 106 m (348 ft)
- Lowest elevation: 10 m (33 ft)
- Population (2023): 1,201
  - Density: 66.69/km^{2} (172.7/sq mi)
- Time zone: UTC+01:00 (CET)
  - Summer (DST): UTC+02:00 (CEST)
- INSEE/Postal code: 22340 /22140
- ^{1} French Land Register data, which excludes lakes, ponds, glaciers > 1 km^{2} (0.386 sq mi or 247 acres) and river estuaries.

Tonquédec (French pronunciation: [tɔ̃kedɛk]; Breton: Tonkedeg) is a commune in the Côtes-d'Armor department of Brittany in northwestern France.

== Population ==
Historical population
Year	Pop.	±% p.a.
1968	958	—
1975	865	−1.45%
1982	1,045	+2.74%
1990	1,061	+0.19%
1999	1,063	+0.02%
2007	1,072	+0.11%
2012	1,131	+1.08%
2017	1,180	+0.85%
2023	1,201	+0.29%
Source: INSEE

Inhabitants of Tonquédec are called tonquédois in French.

== Breton language ==
Most of the inhabitants speaking Breton, the municipality launched a Breton linguistic plan through Ya d'ar brezhoneg on 23 May 2006.

== See also ==
- Château de Tonquédec
- Communes of the Côtes-d'Armor department

== Sister City ==
Corofin, County Clare (Ireland)
