= Derval =

Derval Derva (Gallo) Derwal (Breton)
- Commune
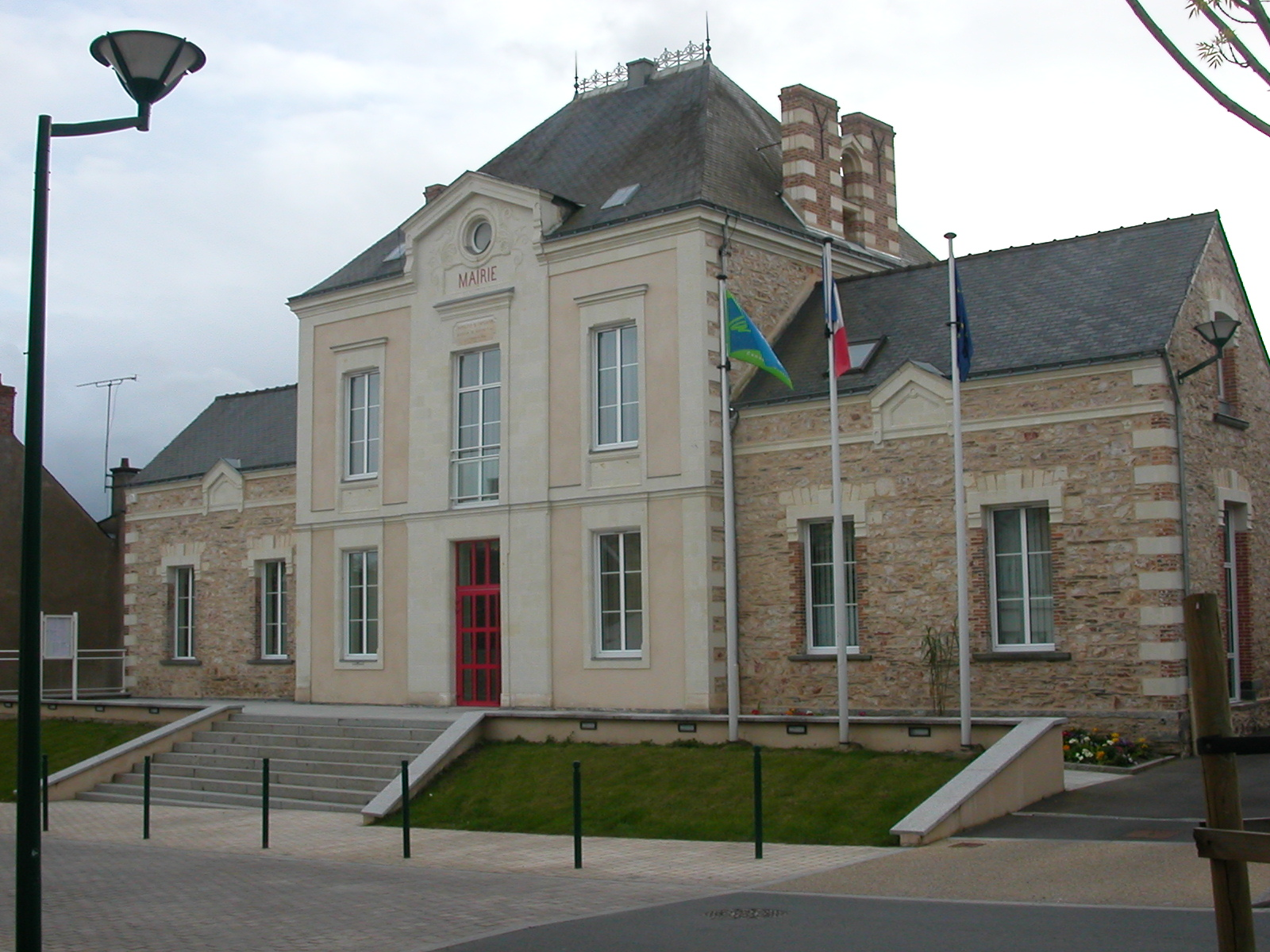
- Town hall

- Coat of arms
- Location of Derval
- Location within France Location within Pays de la Loire
- Coordinates: 47°40′06″N 1°40′12″W
- Country: France
- Region: Pays de la Loire
- Department: Loire-Atlantique
- Arrondissement: Châteaubriant-Ancenis
- Canton: Guémené-Penfao
- Intercommunality: Châteaubriant-Derval

Government
  - Mayor (2020–2026): Dominique David
- Area^{1}: 63.51 km^{2} (24.52 sq mi)
- Highest elevation: 77 m (253 ft)
- Lowest elevation: 8 m (26 ft)
- Population (2023): 3,601
  - Density: 56.70/km^{2} (146.9/sq mi)
- Time zone: UTC+01:00 (CET)
  - Summer (DST): UTC+02:00 (CEST)
- INSEE/Postal code: 44051 /44590
- ^{1} French Land Register data, which excludes lakes, ponds, glaciers > 1 km^{2} (0.386 sq mi or 247 acres) and river estuaries.

Derval (French pronunciation: [dɛʁval]; Gallo: Derva, Breton: Derwal) is a commune in the Loire-Atlantique department in western France.

== Geography ==
The river Chère forms all of the commune's northern border.

== Population ==
Historical population

Year	Pop.	±% p.a.
1793	1,750	—
1821	1,936	+0.36%
1846	2,309	+0.71%
1872	2,968	+0.97%
1901	3,329	+0.40%
1926	3,226	−0.13%
1946	2,859	−0.60%
1962	2,702	−0.35%
1968	2,675	−0.17%

Year	Pop.	±% p.a.
1975	2,591	−0.45%
1982	2,558	−0.18%
1990	2,558	+0.00%
1999	2,491	−0.29%
2007	2,919	+2.00%
2012	3,422	+3.23%
2017	3,489	+0.39%
2023	3,601	+0.53%

Source: EHESS and INSEE (1968-2023)

== International relations ==
Derval is twinned with Llanidloes, a small town in Wales.

== Architecture ==
The castle, also known as the Saint-Clair Tower, is an ancient fortified castle, the remains of which stand in the woods, 2.5 kilometers north-northeast of the town. The building was first partially registered as a historic monument by decree of July 16, 1925 by the French Ministry of Culture, to protect the Saint-Clair tower. In November 2021, protection was extended to the entire site, both built and unbuilt parts, in order to protect the surrounding area, the moats and the buried remains.

== See also ==
- Communes of the Loire-Atlantique department
