= Natalie Victurnienne, Marchioness of Rougé =

French noblewoman

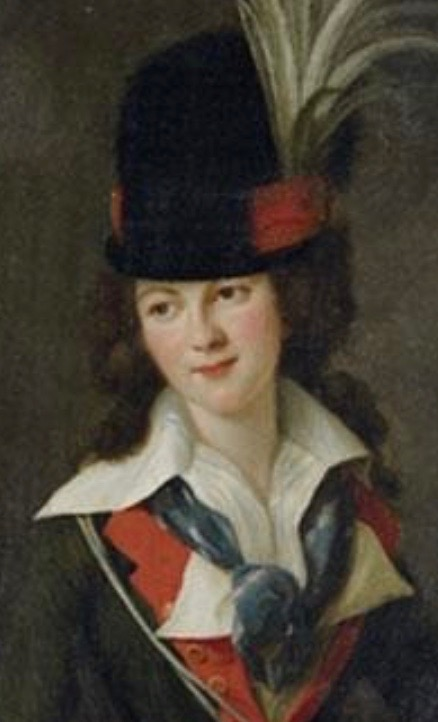
The portrait of Natalie Victurnienne de Rochechouart de Mortemart, marquise de Rougé, par E.L. Vigée-Lebrun

Nathalie-Victurnienne-Delphine de Rochechouart de Mortemart (5 January 1759, in Paris – 25 December 1828), later marquise de Rougé, was a sister of Victurnien-Jean-Baptiste de Rochechouart, 9th Duke of Mortemart, and by marriage a member of the House of Rougé, a noble family of Breton origin.

== Life ==
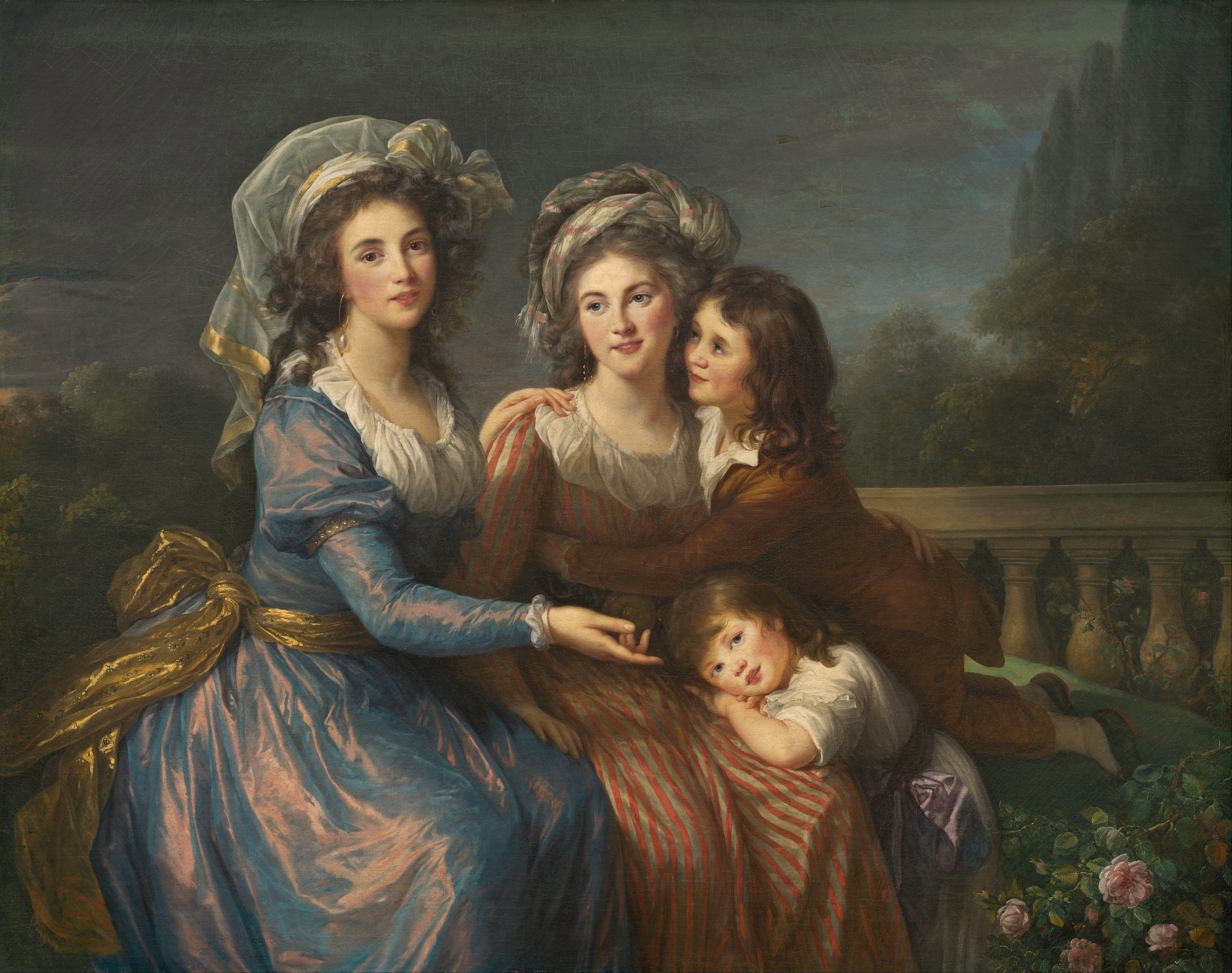
The Marquise de Pezay (or Pezé), and the Marquise de Rougé with her sons Alexis and Adrien; painting by Vigée Le Brun (1787), exhibited at the National Gallery of Art

The daughter of Jean-Victor de Rochechouart, duc de Mortemart (1712–71), Victurnienne-Delphine de Rochechouart-Mortemart was married in 1777 to Bonabes-Jean-Catherine-Alexis de Rougé, 3rd marquis de Rougé (son of Pierre François de Rougé and Julie de Coëtmen), who died five years later while returning from the West Indies on board the ship of the line Zélé, after having fought in the War of American Independence. They had two surviving children:

- Bonabes-Louis-Victurnien-Alexis, marquis de Rougé (1778–1838);
- comte Adrien de Rougé (1782–1861);

Félix, Comte de Rougé, died young.

In 1789 she and her sons left France for Switzerland, and in 1790 they returned and lived in seclusion at the Château de Moreuil with her husband's aunt, Innocente-Catherine-Renée, Duchess d'Elbeuf and Princess de Lorraine (1707–1794; widow of Emmanuel-Maurice de Lorraine). In 1791, with her children, her mother, and M^{me} de Pezay (the former Caroline de Murat), the Marquise de Rougé emigrated to Germany, settling first in Heidelberg. The comte d'Espinchal encountered them there, noting in his journal:

I have found living here since the winter, the Duchess de Mortemart, mother of the Duke and of the Marquis de Mortemart, both of whom are deputies to the Estates-General … and both members of the majority of the conservative nobility. The Marquise de Rougé, their sister, a pretty and amiable widow, is here with her children (she looks more like their sister) … and M^{me} de Pezay … who is her intimate friend.

In 1796 the Marquise de Rougé moved to Wiener Neustadt, near Vienna, where Adrien was admitted to the military academy. She lived in Altona and Münster before returning to Paris in 1798. At first she had to take room and board in a home run by former nuns, as her lands had been expropriated and sold. Her sons joined her in France in 1800. She died on 25 December 1828.
