= Mortemart =

- Commune
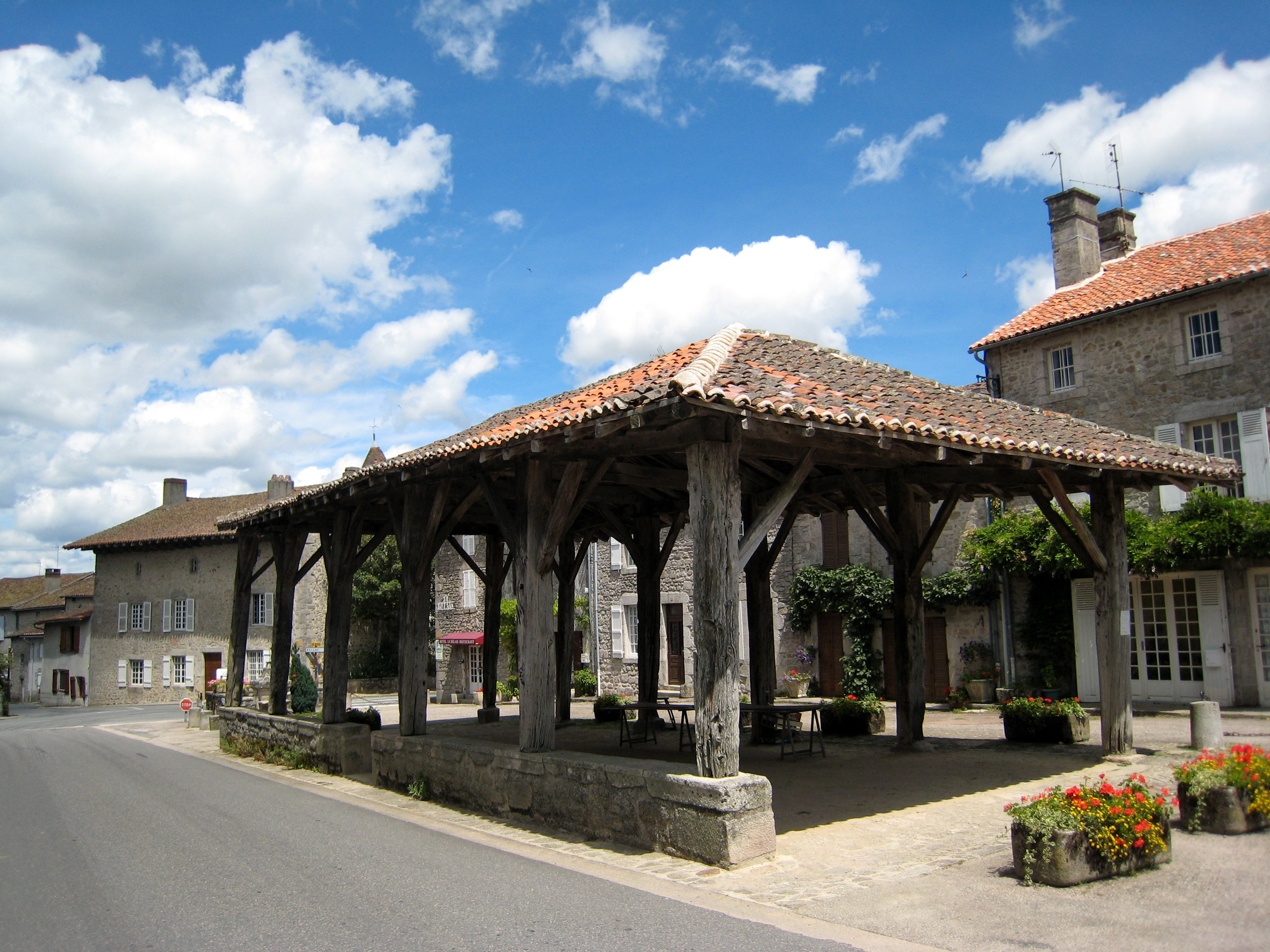
- The marketplace in Mortemart

- Coat of arms
- Location of Mortemart
- Location within France Location within Nouvelle-Aquitaine
- Coordinates: 46°02′33″N 0°57′26″E
- Country: France
- Region: Nouvelle-Aquitaine
- Department: Haute-Vienne
- Arrondissement: Bellac
- Canton: Bellac
- Intercommunality: Haut-Limousin en Marche

Government
  - Mayor (2020–2026): Marie-Catherine Barret-Bonnin
- Area^{1}: 3.60 km^{2} (1.39 sq mi)
- Highest elevation: 355 m (1,165 ft)
- Lowest elevation: 254 m (833 ft)
- Population (2023): 128
  - Density: 35.6/km^{2} (92.1/sq mi)
- Time zone: UTC+01:00 (CET)
  - Summer (DST): UTC+02:00 (CEST)
- INSEE/Postal code: 87101 /87330
- ^{1} French Land Register data, which excludes lakes, ponds, glaciers > 1 km^{2} (0.386 sq mi or 247 acres) and river estuaries.

Mortemart (French pronunciation: [mɔʁtəmaʁ]; Occitan: Mòrtamar) is a commune in the Haute-Vienne department in the Nouvelle-Aquitaine region in west-central France. It is a member of Les Plus Beaux Villages de France (The Most Beautiful Villages of France) Association.

== See also ==
- Communes of the Haute-Vienne department
