= Guyencourt =

- Commune
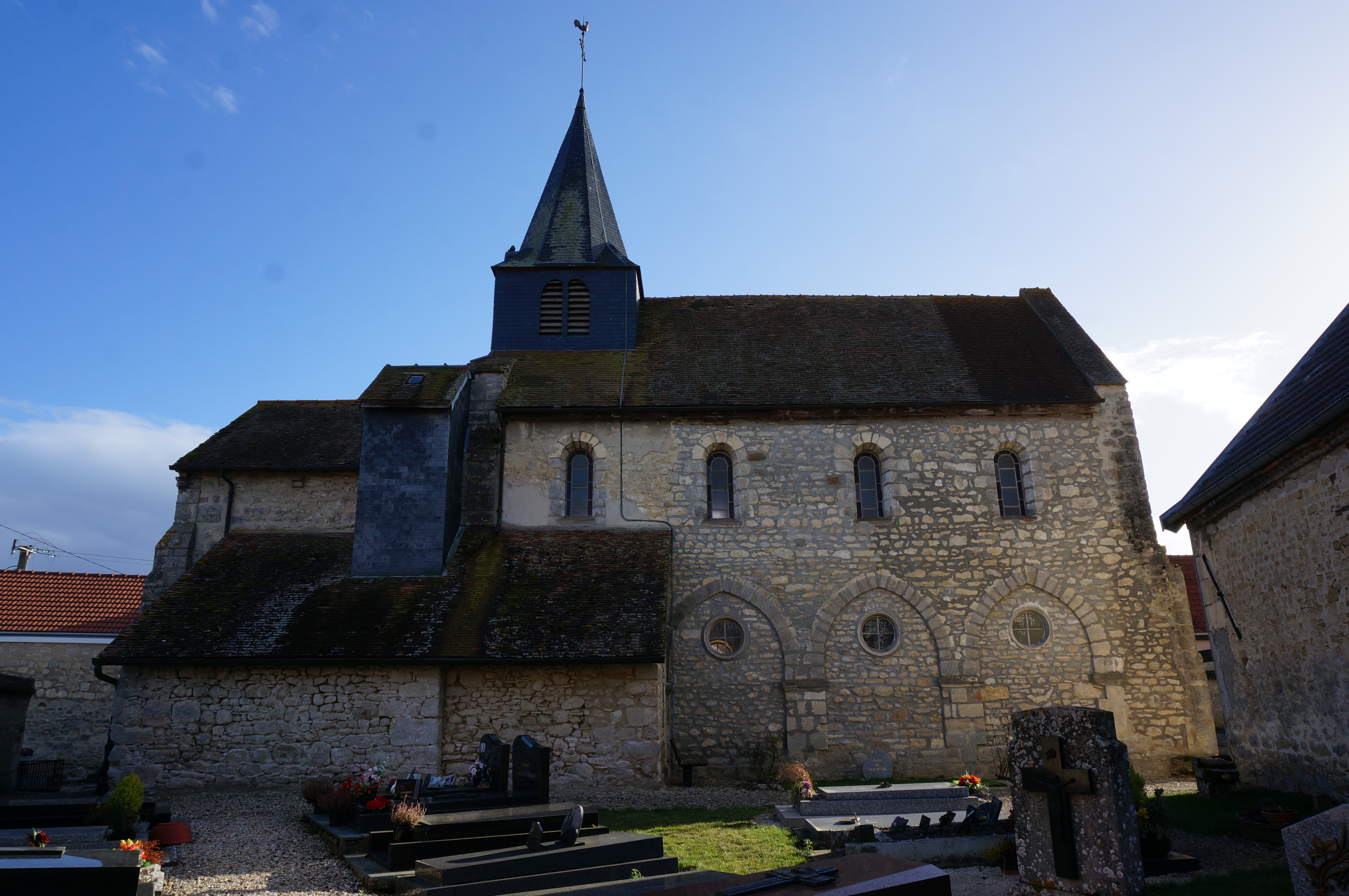
- The church of Guyencourt
- Location of Guyencourt
- Location within France Location within Hauts-de-France
- Coordinates: 49°21′26″N 3°50′13″E
- Country: France
- Region: Hauts-de-France
- Department: Aisne
- Arrondissement: Laon
- Canton: Villeneuve-sur-Aisne
- Intercommunality: Champagne Picarde

Government
  - Mayor (2026–32): Guillaume Aubin
- Area^{1}: 4.2 km^{2} (1.6 sq mi)
- Elevation: 109 m (358 ft)
- Highest elevation: 200 m (660 ft)
- Lowest elevation: 73 m (240 ft)
- Population (2023): 244
  - Density: 58/km^{2} (150/sq mi)
- Time zone: UTC+01:00 (CET)
  - Summer (DST): UTC+02:00 (CEST)
- INSEE/Postal code: 02364 /02160
- ^{1} French Land Register data, which excludes lakes, ponds, glaciers > 1 km^{2} (0.386 sq mi or 247 acres) and river estuaries.

Guyencourt is a commune in the Aisne department in Hauts-de-France in northern France.

== Population ==
Historical population
Year	Pop.	±% p.a.
1968	113	—
1975	114	+0.13%
1982	135	+2.44%
1990	191	+4.43%
1999	224	+1.79%
2007	233	+0.49%
2012	217	−1.41%
2017	253	+3.12%
2023	244	−0.60%
Source: INSEE

== See also ==
- Communes of the Aisne department
