= Rougé =

- Commune
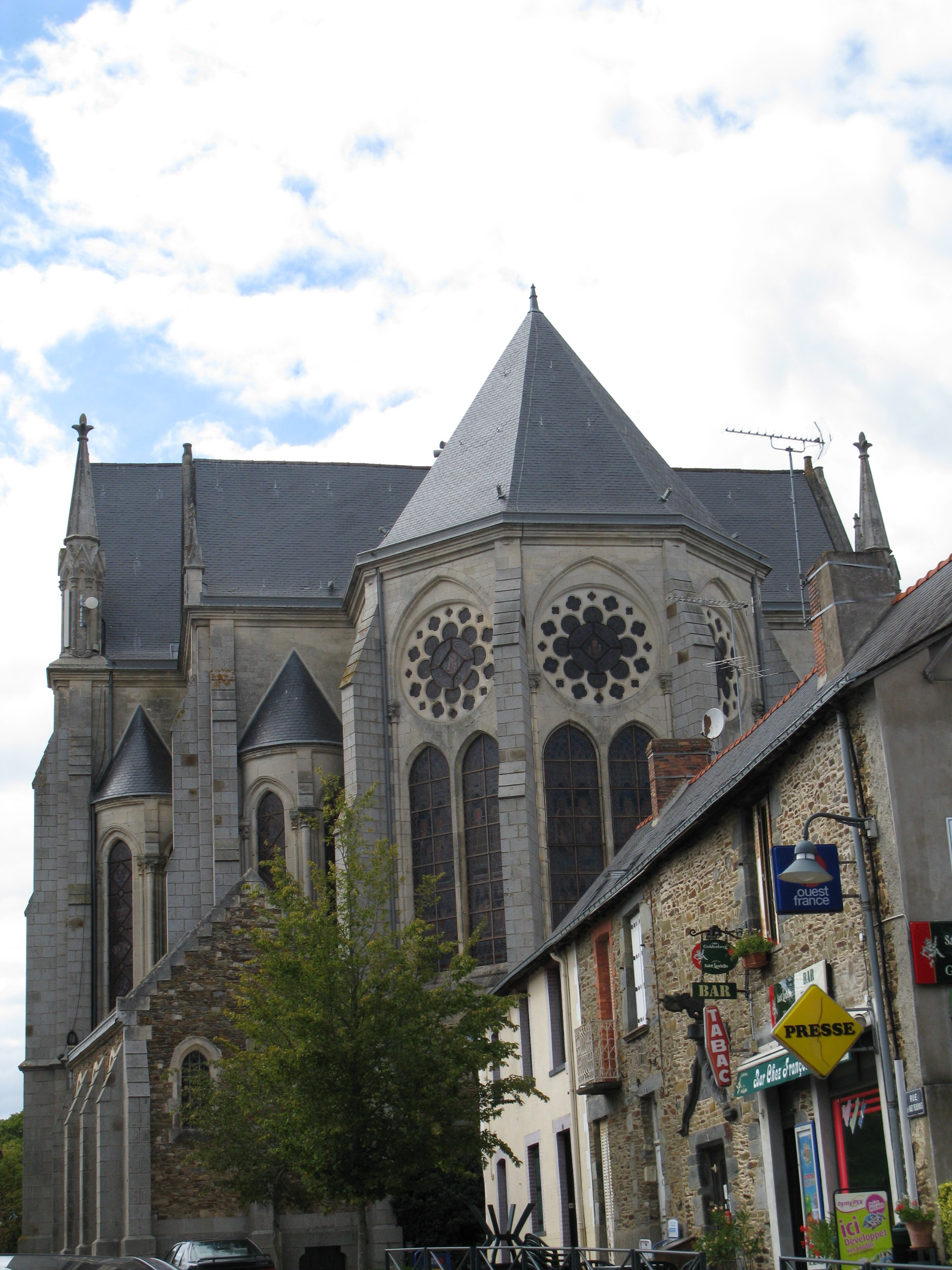

- Coat of arms
- Location of Rougé
- Location within France Location within Pays de la Loire
- Coordinates: 47°47′01″N 1°26′49″W
- Country: France
- Region: Pays de la Loire
- Department: Loire-Atlantique
- Arrondissement: Châteaubriant-Ancenis
- Canton: Châteaubriant
- Intercommunality: Châteaubriant-Derval

Government
  - Mayor (2020–2026): Jean-Michel Duclos
- Area^{1}: 56.32 km^{2} (21.75 sq mi)
- Highest elevation: 109 m (358 ft)
- Lowest elevation: 39 m (128 ft)
- Population (2023): 2,146
  - Density: 38.10/km^{2} (98.69/sq mi)
- Time zone: UTC+01:00 (CET)
  - Summer (DST): UTC+02:00 (CEST)
- INSEE/Postal code: 44146 /44660
- ^{1} French Land Register data, which excludes lakes, ponds, glaciers > 1 km^{2} (0.386 sq mi or 247 acres) and river estuaries.

Rougé (French pronunciation: [ʁuʒe]; Breton: Ruzieg) is a commune in the Loire-Atlantique department in western France, near Rennes.

The name "Rougé" comes from the Latin "Rubiacus", means the red place, in reference to the high iron-composition of the ground.

== Geography ==
The river Chère forms small part of the commune's southern border.

== Population ==
Historical population

Year	Pop.	±% p.a.
1793	2,000	—
1821	2,404	+0.66%
1846	2,603	+0.32%
1872	2,813	+0.30%
1901	2,665	−0.19%
1926	2,357	−0.49%
1946	2,229	−0.28%
1962	2,011	−0.64%
1968	1,995	−0.13%

Year	Pop.	±% p.a.
1975	1,982	−0.09%
1982	2,055	+0.52%
1990	2,167	+0.67%
1999	2,143	−0.12%
2007	2,280	+0.78%
2012	2,232	−0.42%
2017	2,230	−0.02%
2023	2,146	−0.64%

Source: EHESS and INSEE (1968-2023)

== See also ==
- Communes of the Loire-Atlantique department
