= Roger Beauchamp =

Roger Beauchamp may refer to:

- Roger de Beauchamp (fl. 1295–1304), MP for New Shoreham
- Roger Beauchamp, 1st Baron Beauchamp of Bletso (c. 1315–1380), English soldier and peer
- Roger Beauchamp (died 1373), son of the 1st Baron Beauchamp and father to the 2nd Baron Beauchamp
- Roger Beauchamp (1362–1406), 2nd Baron Beauchamp and grandson of the 1st Baron Beauchamp
