= John Minsterworth =

English knight of the 14th century

Sir John Minsterworth
- Died: 12 April 1377; Tyburn, London
- Cause of death: Drawing, hanging and quartering
- Occupations: Soldier, landholder
- Years active: 1367–1377
- Era: Late Medieval
- Employer: Edward III of England
- Known for: Soldiering, treason
- Criminal charges: Conspiracy
- Criminal penalty: Death
- Criminal status: Executed

Sir John Minsterworth (died 1377) was a fourteenth-century English knight from Gloucestershire, who fought in the Hundred Years' War and was executed by King Edward III for treason. Nothing is known of his upbringing (even, for example, when he was knighted or by whom) but he first comes to prominence during the 1370 invasion of France. The war, under the command of the King's son, Edward the Black Prince, was going poorly and had only recently restarted after a nine-year truce. Minsterworth was part of a force sent to relieve the English command in France under the nominal leadership of Sir Robert Knolles, whom contemporaries praised for his military acumen. Landing in the north, Knolles and Minsterworth carved their way to the west of France. There, divisions among the leaders—which may have been present before the campaign began—erupted into mutiny.

Minsterworth may have despised Knolles for his reputation and status, and with others split from Knolles's main force. Much of that force was destroyed in December 1370 by the French army at the Battle of Pontvallain. Minsterworth and a breakaway force made their way to Brittany despite frequent ambushes and French raids, and eventually—albeit seeing most of the remnant of his army massacred on the Breton shore—to England. There he attempted to blame Knolles for the disaster, and although Minsterworth's former commander was found culpable of many of the military mishaps that had occurred, Minsterworth did not escape blame either.

Minsterworth left England in 1372 to join the French army. Five years later he met and conspired with the rebel Welsh lord, Owain Lawgoch, and, for reasons which are now obscure, supported Owen's proposed French-backed invasion of England. In 1377, while still abroad, he was captured by the English and sent home to be tried for treason. Convicted on conspiracy charges, he was executed and his corpse was drawn and quartered before being distributed across the kingdom.

== Service in France and mutiny ==
Nothing is known of John Minsterworth's early life, although he was probably born in Minsterworth, Gloucestershire, from which he presumably took his surname. The historian Andrew Ayton describes him as a "shadowy ... man of obscure origins". His first recorded appearance is in 1367 when took a contract with Humphrey, Earl of Hereford to serve in France; he was also responsible for recruiting Hereford's large retinue. The following year he indentured to join the 1370 English expedition to France during the Hundred Years' War. His activities on that campaign then have incurred criticism from various historians; James Sherborne, for example, has said Minsterworth caused "much trouble" on the campaign, while the historian Jonathan Sumption describes him as an "ambitious hothead".

The expeditionary force assembled at Rye and Winchelsea in July 1370. It was the first English army to France led by a commander below the rank of earl or other peers. The command was originally given to Sir Robert Knolles of Cheshire, but delays and criticism of Knolles resulted in joint command given to Knolles and three other experienced captains, Sir Alan Buxhull, Sir Thomas Grandison and Sir John Bourchier. Minsterworth acted under Knolles's captaincy. Sherborne suggests that there may possibly have been "some doubt about Knolles ... even before the army sailed". This system of shared leadership appears to have led to jealousies and rivalries arising, particularly regarding how ransom and booty would be distributed. (Note: An important aspect of the campaign: the French chronicler Pierre d'Orgemont wrote (in his Chroniques des Regnes de Jean II et Charles V) how, as Knolles's army marched through northern France burning the wheat and "great houses", the English destroyed what they wanted, unless ransoms were paid. On a previous campaign in 1357–1360, Knolles used the same tactic with profitable results. The historian Michael Jones has described how on that occasion Knolles's army "left a trail of ravaged villages, whose charred gables were known as 'Knolles' mitres' "; and how, as a result, Knolles made around £15,000 in booty.) The medievalist Mark Ormrod suggests that Knolles's appointment may have implied superiority over his fellow captains, exacerbating tensions among them, of whom Minsterworth was the most outspoken. Contemporary chronicler claim that Knolles's lacked breeding. Jean Le Bel states that he was originally a clothworker, while Thomas Walsingham says he was a "poor and lowly valet". Either way, Minsterworth seems to have seen himself as socially outranking Knolles. As a result, Sumption suggests that Minsterworth "conceived a virulent hatred of his commander", with Minsterworth calling Knolles such names as "the Old Freebooter", an "old brigand", and a "tomb-robber" while constantly criticising his leadership. (Note: The French chronicler Jean Le Bel also says that Knolles first "became a footsoldier in brigandine". Le Bel's modern editor, Nigel Bryant, comments on Le Bel's description of Knolles as a brigand et soldoyer pyé that This could be interpreted as a blunt statement that [Knolles] became "a brigand and a mercenary", but elsewhere ... Le Bel uses "brigand" in reference to the brigandine as he classifies troops by their armour, and Le Bel seems here to be emphasising Knolles's low status, with implicit dismay that one of his origins should acquire power and wealth.)

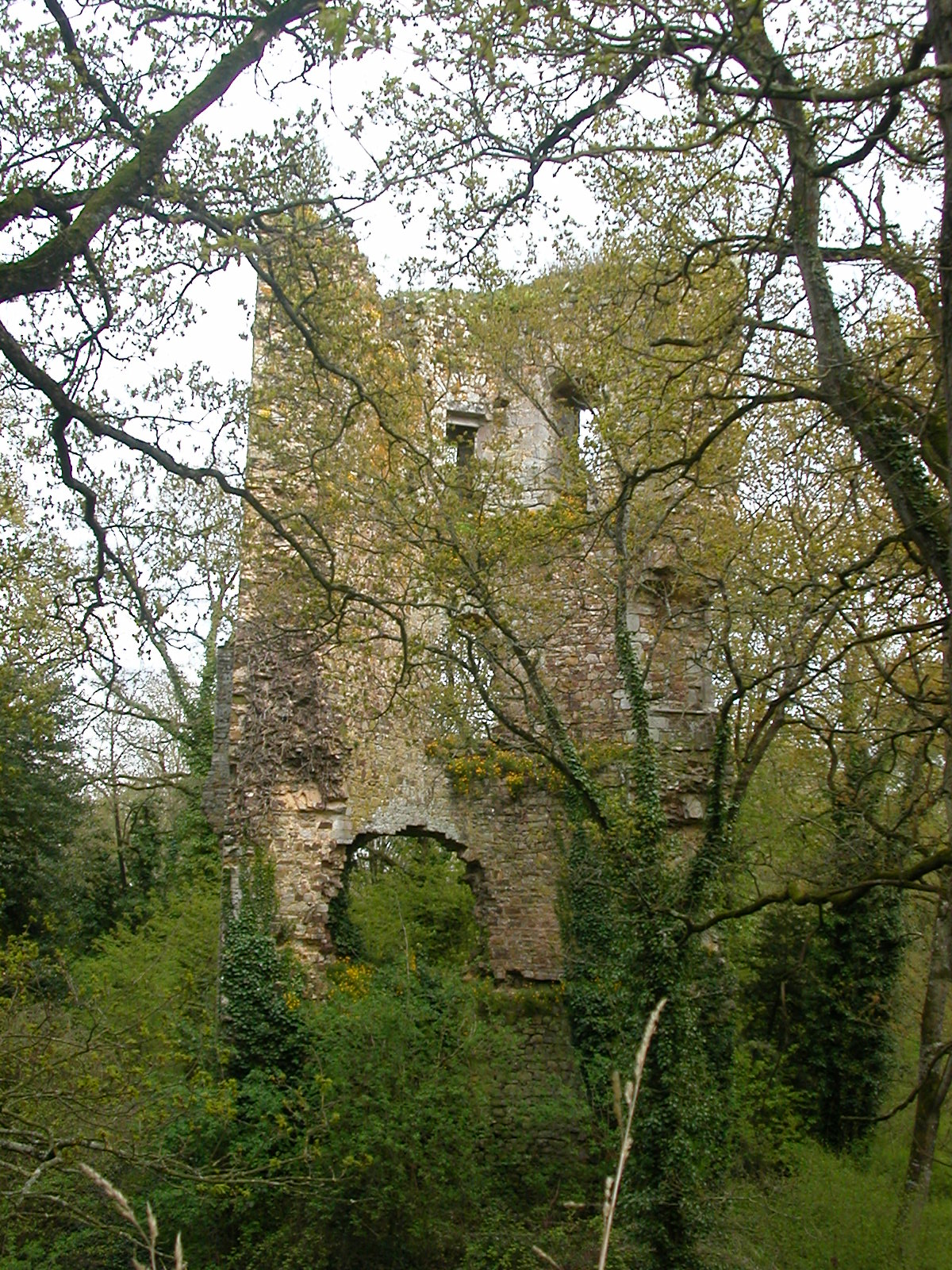
The remains, in 2008, of Minsterworth's likely destination following the disaster at Pontvallain; Knolles's Derval Castle, Brittany

Although Minsterworth has been seen as a "comparatively obscure" figure in political society, and of "very modest means", he nevertheless commanded the largest retinue of the army, second only to Knolles himself. His contingent comprised ten knights, around 200 men-at-arms and 300 archers. The scholar Anne Curry argues that by then, gentry such as Minsterworth were being relied on to field armies comparable in size to those led by the nobility in the earlier years of the war. For this he received £2000 in advance wages. Geographically, his force was recruited from across the country. This included areas close to Minsterworth, such as South Wales and Gloucester, but also further afield, such as Bedfordshire, London, Kingston upon Thames, Daventry, Lincolnshire and Warwickshire. (Note: How Minsterworth was able to pay for such a retinue is another question, says Baker, asking: "wealthy magnates like John of Gaunt and the earl of Buckingham might have been able to afford to equip the huge retinues which they took to war. How, though, would a captain like Sir John Minsterworth ... a man of only local, at best regional, standing, and men in his position, be able to afford to equip soldiers from their own pocket in such numbers?") In this, he was not unlike the great ducal captains, who also recruited far beyond their feudal heartlands, and entered sub-indentures. Much of this force was composed of "footloose professionals", as they have been called, often little more than a collection of "outcasts, apostate clergymen and criminals on the run ... who served for loot and pardons". Minsterworth had to rely on such men because he lacked the recruiting networks in England that a great lord would have possessed through land holding, tenantry and wide-ranging social influence. While he did recruit men of status who could themselves recruit, such as Sir Thomas Fauconberg (Note: Occasionally rendered Faucomberge.) from the Marches, in many cases his recruitment may reflect connections made as a freebooter. This was in contrast, for example, to Knolles, whose wealth allowed him to bear the cost of maintaining an army in the field for an extended period.

Landing at Calais, the army began a chevauchée (horse charge) across northern and southwestern France to Bordeaux. This was intended to draw the French away from Aquitaine, where the Black Prince was about to begin another campaign with John, Earl of Pembroke. By November 1370, Minsterworth had rebelled under Knolles's leadership, and became the leader of the increasingly numerous malcontents. Although by this time Knolles was a soldier of "great fame", says the medievalist Rosemary Horrox, Minsterworth neither appreciated nor respected the man or his abilities. The scholar Michael Prestwich has suggested that his eventual desertion from Knolles's army was encouraged by the dire straits Knolles's army now found itself in. The chevauchée had achieved superficial successes, but, due to its failure to force the French to battle, it was under constant attrition; by now, the army was on the verge of disintegration, mainly due to Minsterworth's mutiny. Knolles may have aggravated his fellow captains further by keeping for himself a disproportionally large amount of the ransoms and booty. This was important to Minsterworth, not only because it impacted his own potential profit, but made it harder to pay his own men, who might, in turn, have deserted him. The tactical and military failures of the campaign were placed firmly at Knolles's door, and he was increasingly accused of misjudgement and inexperience; he may have been as unwilling to face the French in open battle as they were him, which could also have increased dissent among men who felt themselves to be "better formed in chivalry"; Minsterworth told his companions, "it redounded to their great dishonour to be subjected" to Knolles.

=== Division of the English force ===
And before the feast of Christmas, the chief men of the army, out of envy and self-importance, split into four parts, to the great harm of England, and great comfort of the enemies: that is to say, the Lord of Grandson with his men in one part, the Lord FitzWalter in another, and Sir John Minsterworth in the third part, and Sir Robert Knolles in the fourth.

— The Anonimalle Chronicle, 64–65

A contemporary chronicler relates how "out of envy and self-importance" the English captains ended up dividing their army into four, and went separate ways, probably to make foraging easier and increase profits. Minsterworth's force was the first to leave; Knolles followed, taking the majority of the army with him. Soon after, in early December 1370, what remained of the English army was routed at the Battle of Pontvallain. Minsterworth was at the battle, and clearly far enough away to escape the enemy. It is possible that he was in communication with the French and that his information lead to the English collapse.

Whatever role Minsterworth played, on hearing of the result he fled to Brittany, probably to Knolles's castle at Derval. There, with Knolles, he spent the winter comfortably. Minsterworth decided to return his army to England early the following year. (Note: Or, as the contemporary Anonimalle Chronicle says, "the said Sir John Minsterworth, hearing of this affair, put to sea with all his men and arrived safely in England.) Leaving Knolles in Derval, Minsterworth led a force of somewhere between a few hundred and 1,100 men (Note: The exact figure is unknown; Sumption tends towards the lower figure, while the scholar Gary Baker posits the higher.)—possibly including recently arrived, albeit now useless, reinforcements from England—to the port of Pointe Saint-Mathieu, Finistère. Continual ambushes depleted their numbers en route. Worse news awaited them. When they arrived at the port, there were only two small ships available, far too few for the couple of hundred men who needed transport. Minsterworth was one of the few who could afford passage; those who remained were massacred when the French caught up with them.

=== Return to England ===
Minsterworth's return to England "as one of the only prominent survivors either not dead, still serving in France, or languishing in a French prison", began a lengthy period of acrimony and recrimination. While he bore most responsibility for the disaster—being, according to Baker, "as guilty as any man for the break up of the army"—at first Minsterworth managed to avoid almost all the blame by putting the responsibility on Knolles. In July 1372, the King's Council effectively agreed with him and condemned Knolles and Buxhill for the defeat.

After the Black Prince and John of Gaunt spoke out for Knolles, the King declared that "he should not be held as responsible as his men for their unruliness, disobedience and arrogance". Edward ensured that Minsterworth was no longer exculpated: he was immediately arrested and charged with traducing Knolles. Minsterworth failed to appear before the council's enquiry, and at this point—"humiliated...and frustrated in his ambitions"—renounced his allegiance to Edward III. His failure to appear before the council resulted in automatic outlawry, meaning his estates could be seized by the crown.

== Later years, treason and death ==
=== Renegade in France ===
Minsterworth again left for France in 1372. He was serving in the French army the following year, but it is unknown if this was after surrender or capture, or whether he was already in contact with King Charles V of France by now. The Anonimalle Chronicler condemned this as a betrayal of trust, castigating Minsterworth as having "sold himself to the French", or "contrary to his faith and allegiance". Soon after, on 20 December 1373, the escheator of the Duchy of Lancaster was ordered to confiscate all the lands Minsterworth held from John of Gaunt, Duke of Lancaster, Minsterworth's feudal lord in Gloucestershire and the Marches. Minsterworth appears to have been accompanied by his old comrade-in-arms, Thomas Fauconberg, who defected at the same time; "the fact that both these men took this huge step must be more than coincidence", argues . Describing it as an intriguing choice to make, he posits that Fauconberg was easily led, in this case by Minsterworth. (Note: Fauconberg was not captured until July 1378. Unlike Minsterworth, he was imprisoned in various royal castles, not being released until c. 1392, an experience which relatives claimed had "almost destroyed him". He and his son John joined the unsuccessful rebellion of 1405; while John was beheaded, Thomas was pardoned on the grounds of mental illness.)

By 1376, King Charles had formulated a plan to invade England with a large Franco-Castilian Navy, or "army of the sea", as the French named it. Although the intended logistics of this campaign, or how it was to be implemented, is uncertain, Sumption has speculated that a French fleet was to "burn their way west" along the south coast of England on their way to land Owain Lawgoch at Milford Haven. Owen was a pretender to the throne of the Aberffraw princes, and Charles's plan was for him to lead a French expeditionary force army with the now-renegade Minsterworth. Sumption also argues that "what Minsterworth could contribute, or indeed expected to get out of this adventure, is more difficult to say".

=== Capture by the English ===
Minsterworth was accused of "certain misdeeds before the King and fearing the punishment due to him, therefore, like a false and forsworn traitor, he fled to France unto the King's enemies, and then was sworn unto the French King, and conspired against his natural lord and master undertaking to direct the Spanish Navy and bring them into England, to the confusion and destruction of his native country."

— George Harrison, Observations in Support of the Title of the King, Jure Ducatus..., 1832

Early in 1377 Minsterworth travelled to Castile to arrange the despatch of troops, materiel and transports for the invasion. In March, he was captured in Pamplona, Navarre, by a Gascon squire; (Note: The exact date is of his capture is uncertain, but it was certainly not before 8 March.) letters discussing the proposed invasion were found on him. Minsterworth was taken to Bordeaux before being returned to England. He originally landed at Bristol, but as a local landowner, appears to have had some support in the area. When the royal council discovered that an attempt at his rescue was planned, he was immediately transferred to the Tower of London. Under interrogation—including torture—Minsterworth revealed French plans to launch their galley fleet in May the following year.

He was tried for treason within the Guildhall in the City of London before the Mayor, Nicholas Brembre, and other royal justices. Here he also confessed to meeting Owen and stated that they were both to have led the invasion. This was deemed further treason, being "willful support of the King's enemies" and was sentenced to be drawn, hanged and quartered. (Note: Writing nearly two-hundred years later, the antiquarian and chronicler Richard Baker also suggests another, rather more prosaic, element to Minsterworth's prosecution, viz, that Minsterworth had defrauded his soldiers of their wages, although Baker gives no further details as to where or when this may have occurred.)

=== Execution ===
About this time [1376] exemplary Juftice was done upon Sir John Midfterworth, Knight, who was drawn, hanged and quartered at Tyburn for Treafon by him committed, in defrauding Souldiers of their Wages.

— Richard Baker, Chronicle of the Kings of England from the Time of the Romans' Government unto the Death of King James, 1643

Before his execution, Minsterworth was allowed write to the King. Although the letter is lost, it "probably contained an appeal for mercy and the usual kind of promise of information". He never received a response as it was probably opened by the Earl Marshal, Henry Percy, and never seen by Edward. This may have been, as suggested by David Moore, because Minsterworth named prominent sympathisers of Owen's which it was felt the King should be shielded from.

Minsterworth was executed on 12 April 1377 at Tyburn, and his body was quartered after death. One portion was sent to Carmarthen, the administrative centre of South Wales, probably to convey a "brutal message" to any would-be supporter of Owen. Another portion was sent to Bristol—where his estates were centred—and the remainder as far apart as Dover and Newcastle. Owen was assassinated by an English agent the following year. Minsterworth's head was placed above London Bridge, where it remained until the Peasant's revolt in 1381, when it was replaced on its pole by the head of Simon Sudbury, Archbishop of Canterbury.

== Estates ==
The Inquisition post mortem held after Minsterworth's execution casts light upon his land-holding, much of which was held directly off John of Gaunt, son of King Edward III. This was particularly concentrated in the southwest of England. His estate included 30 acres (12 ha) of land, five of meadow, and a messuage in Minsterworth itself. He held a corrody in Leonard Stanley, Gloucestershire for fee, as well as another messuage in the City of Gloucester. Minsterworth also held estates further afield; for example, in South Wales (around Usk), and Norfolk (in North Barsham). Since Minsterworth had been condemned as an outlaw in 1373, all his lands in Gloucestershire were forfeited to Gaunt per jure ducatus, while those in Wales and Leonard Stanley went to the King under his right of jure coronae. (Note: Under a royal charter issued him in 1365, Gaunt was authorised to seize the "houses, lands, and tenements, rents and revenues, with all their appurtenances" of any of his ducal tenants if outlawed. These had been granted to one John de Bath by 10 April 1375.)

== Legacy ==
Minsterworth was distained by his contemporaries. Walsingham described him as "with a willing hand but a deceptive and distorted mind" (maim quidem promptus, sed mente fallax et perversus). In the mid-fifteenth century, the antiquarian John Leland dismissed him as "John Minsterworth English Traitor" (Johannes Menstreworthe Anglus Proditor), and a century later Holinshed said Minsterworth was "a good man of his hands (as we call him) but perverse of mind, and verie deceitful". Sumption views the later events of Minsterworth's life as indicating that he was afflicted by mental instability. On the other hand, Sumption also suggests that—in view of how Minsterworth was trusted by Charles to make the arrangements with Castille and to lead the invasion fleet—"he must have been a plausible talker in spite of his shady past".

A 16th-century edition of Ranulf Higden's c. 1377 chronicle Polychronicon, (Note: Actual title: Ranulphi Castrensis, cognomine Higden, Polychronicon (sive Historia Polycratica) ab initio mundi usque ad mortem regis Edwardi III in septem libros dispositum. Held at the British Library under the classification of MS Royal 14 C.II.) contained an illustration of Minsterworth and a description of his execution. The image is on an otherwise unillustrated mappa mundi at the beginning of the Polychronicon, possibly suggesting that particular version of the manuscript has a local provenance.

== Bibliography ==
- Armitage-Smith, S. (1905). John of Gaunt: King of Castile and Leon, Duke of Aquitaine and Lancaster. New York: Constable. OCLC 22041696.
- Ayton, A. (2017). "The Military Careerist in Fourteenth-century England". Journal of Medieval History. 43: 4–23. OCLC 1176172485.
- Baker, G. P. (2011). The English Way of War, 1360–1399 (PhD thesis). University of Hull. OCLC 899693280.
- Baker, G. P. (2014). "Investigating the Socio-Economic Origins of English Archers in the Second Half of the Fourteenth Century". In Rogers, C. J.; DeVries, K.; France, J. (eds.). Journal of Medieval Military History. Vol. XII. Woodbridge: Boydell & Brewer Ltd. pp. 173–216. ISBN 978-1-84383-936-1.
- Baker, G. P. (2018). "Sir Robert Knolles' Expedition to France in 1370: New Perspectives". In Baker, G. P.; Lambert, C. L.; Simpkin, D. (eds.). Military Communities in Late Medieval England: Essays in Honour of Andrew Ayton. Woodbridge: Boydell. pp. 147–180. ISBN 978-1-78327-298-3.
- Baker, G. P. (2019). "Armies". In Curry, A. (ed.). The Hundred Years War Revisited. Problems in Focus. London: Macmillan International Higher Education. pp. 203–225. ISBN 978-1-13738-987-9.
- Baker, R. (1684). A Chronicle of the Kings of England: From the Time of the Romans Government, Unto the Death of King James. London: H. Sawbridge. OCLC 1344292.
- Bel, Jean Le (2011). Bryant, N. (ed.). The True Chronicles of Jean Le Bel, 1290–1360. Woodbridge: Boydell & Brewer. ISBN 978-1-84383-694-0.
- Bell, A. R.; Chapman, A.; Curry, A.; King, A.; Simpkin, D., eds. (2011). The Soldier Experience in the Fourteenth Century. Woodbridge: Boydell Press. ISBN 978-1-84383-674-2.
- Bellamy, J. G. (1970). The Law of Treason in England in the Later Middle Ages. Cambridge: Cambridge University Press. ISBN 978-0-52107-830-6.
- Blomefield, F. (1807). An Essay Towards a Topographical History of the County of Norfolk: Gallow and Brothercross, Blofield, Clackclose. Vol. VII. London: W. Miller. OCLC 655834192.
- Carr, A. D. (2004a). "Owen of Wales (d. 1378)". Oxford Dictionary of National Biography (online ed.). Oxford University Press.
- Carr, A. D. (2004b). "Sais, Sir Gregory (d. 1390)". Oxford Dictionary of National Biography (online ed.). Oxford University Press.
- Chapman, A. (2015). Welsh Soldiers in the Later Middle Ages, 1282–1422. Woodbridge: Boydell. ISBN 978-1-78327-031-6.
- Dennison, L.; Rogers, N. (2002). "A Medieval Best-Seller: Some Examples of Decorated Copies of Higden's Polychronicon". In Barron, C. M.; Stratford, J. (eds.). The Church and Learning in Later Medieval Society: Essays in Honour of R. B. Dobson. Proceedings of the 1999 Harlaxton Symposium. Donington: Shaun Tyas. pp. 64–79. ISBN 978-1-90028-952-8.
- Excursions (1951). "The Murder of Simon of Sudbury, 1381". Transactions of the Essex Archaeological Society. N.S. 24: 210. OCLC 863427366.
- Fisher, D. (2010). Royal Wales. Cardiff: University of Wales Press. ISBN 978-0-70832-214-7.
- Fowler, K. (2001). Medieval Mercenaries: The Great Companies. Vol. I. Oxford: Blackwell. ISBN 978-0-631-15886-8.
- Galbraith, V. H. (1959). "An Autograph MS of Ranulph Higden's "Polychronicon"". Huntington Library Quarterly. 23: 1–18. OCLC 863045266.
- Harrison, G. (1832). Observations in Support of the Title of the King, Jure Ducatus, to all Escheats and Forfeitures, Arising within the Fees or Liberties of the Duchy of Lancaster. London: W. Clowes. OCLC 894821659.
- Horrox, R. E.; Ormrod, W. M., eds. (2006). A Social History of England, 1200–1500. Cambridge: Cambridge University Press. ISBN 978-0-52178-954-7.
- Hoskins, P. (2020). The Black Prince and King Jean II of France: Generalship in the Hundred Years War. Barnsley: Pen and Sword Military. ISBN 978-1-52674-990-1.
- Jones, M. (2004). "Knolles, Sir Robert (d. 1407)". Oxford Dictionary of National Biography (online ed.). Oxford University Press.
- Jones, M. (2017). The Black Prince: The King That Never Was. London: Head of Zeus. ISBN 978-1-78497-293-6.
- Julian-Jones, M. (2020). Murder During the Hundred Year War: The Curious Case of Sir William Cantilupe. Barnsley: Pen and Sword. ISBN 978-1-52675-082-2.
- King, A. (2019). "Chivalry and the Hundred Years war". In Curry, A. (ed.). The Hundred Years War Revisited. Problems in Focus. London: Macmillan International Higher Education. pp. 133–152. ISBN 978-1-13738-987-9.
- Leland, J. (1770). Hearne, T. (ed.). Joannis Lelandi Antiquarii de rebus Britannicis Collectanea (in Latin). Vol. II. London: Impensis Gul. & Jo. Richardson. OCLC 1051506404.
- McNiven, P. (2004). "Fauconberg, Sir Thomas (1345–1407)". Oxford Dictionary of National Biography (online ed.). Oxford University Press.
- Moore, D. (2007). The Welsh Wars of Independence: c. 410–c. 1415. Tempus History of Wales. Stroud: History Press. ISBN 978-0-75244-128-3.
- Ormrod, W. M. (2012). Edward III. Yale Medieval Monarchs. Padstow: Yale University Press. ISBN 978-0-30011-910-7.
- Prestwich, M. (1996). Armies and Warfare in the Middle Ages: The English Experience. New Haven: Yale University Press. ISBN 978-0-30006-452-0.
- Riley, H. T. (1863). Thomae Walsingham, Quondam Monachi S. Albani, Historia Anglicana: A.D. 1272–1381. London: Longman, Green, Longman, Roberts, and Green. OCLC 1006468538.
- Rogers, C. L. (2000). The Wars of Edward III: Sources and Interpretations. Woodbridge: Boydell Press. ISBN 978-0-85115-646-0.
- Sherborne, J. (1994). Tuck, A. (ed.). War, Politics and Culture in Fourteenth-century England. London: The Hambledon Press. ISBN 978-1-85285-086-9.
- Simpson, W. S. (1895). "On the Head of Simon Of Sudbury, a Relic Preserved in the Church of St Gregory's, Sudbury, Suffolk". Journal of the British Archaeological Association. New. I: 126–147. OCLC 1027088205.
- Sumption, J. (2009). Divided Houses: Hundred Years War. Vol. III. London: Faber & Faber. ISBN 978-0-57124-012-8.
- THP (2022). "Edward the Third, who came to the Crowne by the Resignation of his Father Edward the second". The Holinshed Project. Archived from the original on 9 March 2022.
- Tout, T. F. (1905). The History of England from the Accession of Henry III to the Death of Edward III (1216–1377). London: Longmans, Green. OCLC 249908468.
- Warner, M. P. (2021). The Agincourt Campaign of 1415: The Retinues of the Dukes of Clarence and Gloucester. Woodbridge: Boydell & Brewer. ISBN 978-1-78327-636-3.
- Warner, G. F.; Gilson, J. P. (1921). Catalogue of Western Manuscripts in the Old Royal and King's Collections: Royal mss. 12 A. I to 20 E. X and App. 1–89. Vol. II. London: British Museum. OCLC 963994532.
