= Château de la Faigne =

Castle in Pays de la Loire, France

Château de la Faigne was a castle in Pays de la Loire, France.

== History ==
An English force, led by Thomas de Grandison was defeated beneath the walls of the castle on 4 December 1370, by a French force led by Bertrand du Guesclin and Jean IV de Mauquenchy, during the Hundred Years' War. Among the French casualties was the marshal, Arnoul d'Audrehem, who was mortally wounded. The English force was almost wiped out. Grandison, Philip Courtenay and Hugh Despenser, were captured.
