= Olivier V de Clisson =

Breton general (1336–1407)

Olivier de Clisson, Olivier V de Clisson,
- Constable of France
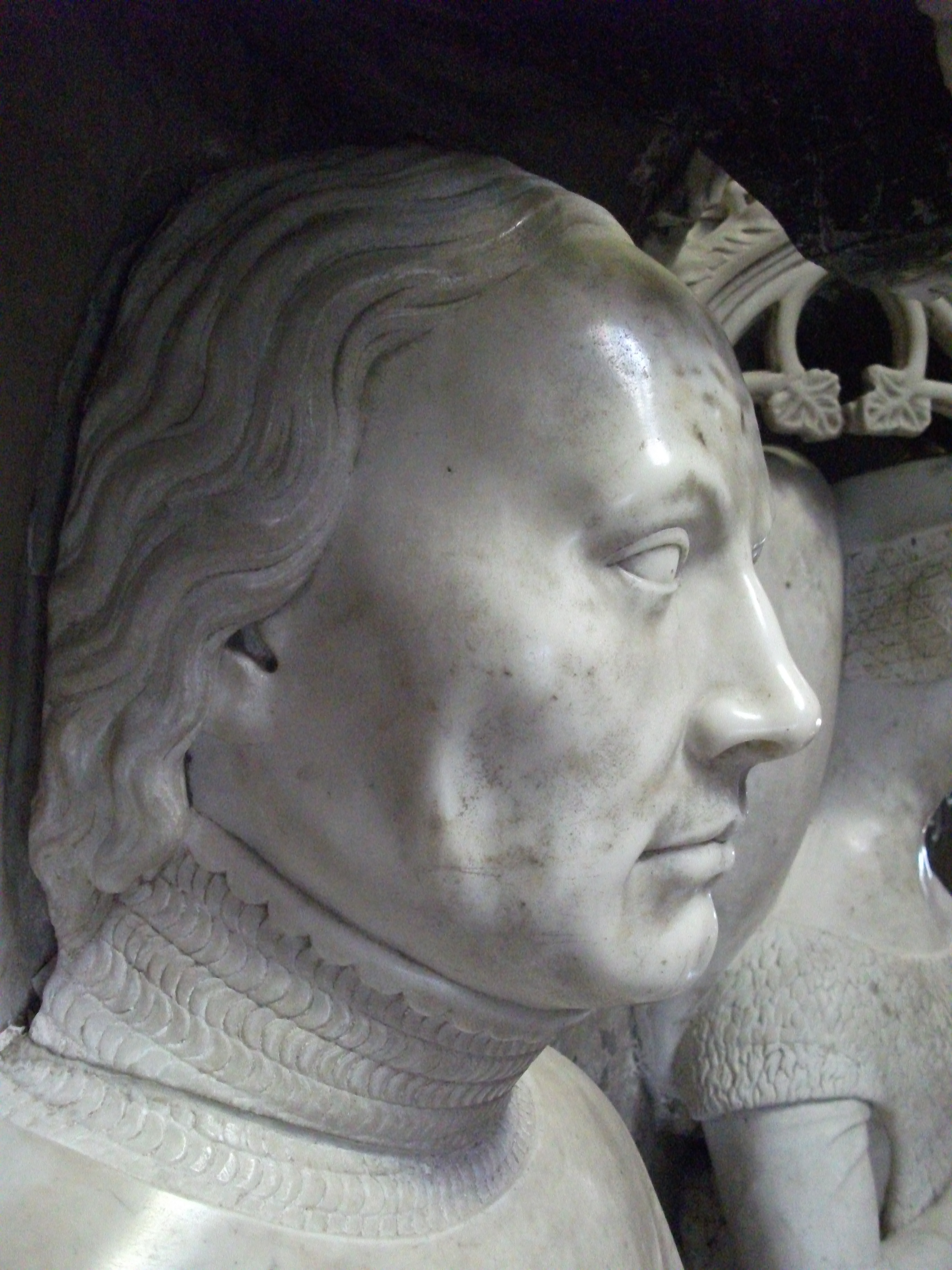
- Detail from Olivier's tomb
- Born: 23 April 1336; Château de Clisson, Brittany
- Died: 23 April 1407 (aged 71); Josselin, Brittany
- Buried: Chapel at Josselin Castle
- Noble family: de Clisson
- Spouses: Catherine of Laval and Chateaubrian; Maguerite de Rohan
- Issue: Beatrice; Marguerite
- Father: Olivier IV de Clisson (Breton Lord)
- Mother: Jeanne de Clisson

Olivier V de Clisson (23 April 1336 – 23 April 1407), nicknamed "The Butcher", was a Breton soldier, the Constable of France, and the son of Olivier IV de Clisson. His father had been put to death by the French in 1343 on the suspicion of having willingly given up the city of Vannes to the English.

== Biography ==
Olivier de Clisson was born on 23 April 1336 at the Château de Clisson in Brittany.

=== Clisson family context ===
Olivier's father chose the camp of Charles de Blois and the King of France in the Breton War of Succession and was the military commander defending the city of Vannes when the English besieged it in 1342. His father was captured by the English and imprisoned, but was released after a relatively low ransom was paid. Because of the amount, the King of France, Philip VI and his advisers suspected Clisson of conspiring with King Edward III.

After a peace treaty was signed, his father was invited to Paris for a tournament, but was arrested, tried and executed by beheading on 2 August 1343. This expeditious execution shocked the nobility as the evidence of guilt was never made public. Moreover, the notion of betrayal does not refer in the same way for nobles of that time: they claimed the right to choose whom to honor. Olivier IV's body received additional posthumous humiliation: his body was hanged by the armpits at the gallows at Montfaucon in Paris, and his head was piked at the Sauvetout gate of Nantes.

Coat of arms of the Clisson family

=== Formative years on the seas and in England ===
Olivier's mother, Jeanne de Clisson née de Belleville, swore Olivier and his brother Guillaume to avenge their father. She raised funds for an army to attack troops loyal to France, stationed in Brittany. Eventually she armed ships and started a piratical war against French ships. These ships were eventually lost and Jeanne with her two sons set adrift for five days. Guillaume died of thirst, cold and exhaustion. Olivier and his mother were finally rescued and taken to Morlaix by Montfort supporters.

It was after these events that Olivier was taken by his mother to England in his youth. Hereafter, he was raised in the court of King Edward III alongside John IV de Montfort, a future claimant of the Ducal throne of Brittany. Olivier's mother Jeanne, eventually married her fourth husband, an English military commander of King Edward III.

=== Breton War of Succession ===
After ten years in England, Olivier, then twenty-three, accompanied King Edward III and John IV de Montfort at the head of a Breton-English force to Brittany in 1359 as part of a guerrilla campaign near Poitou.

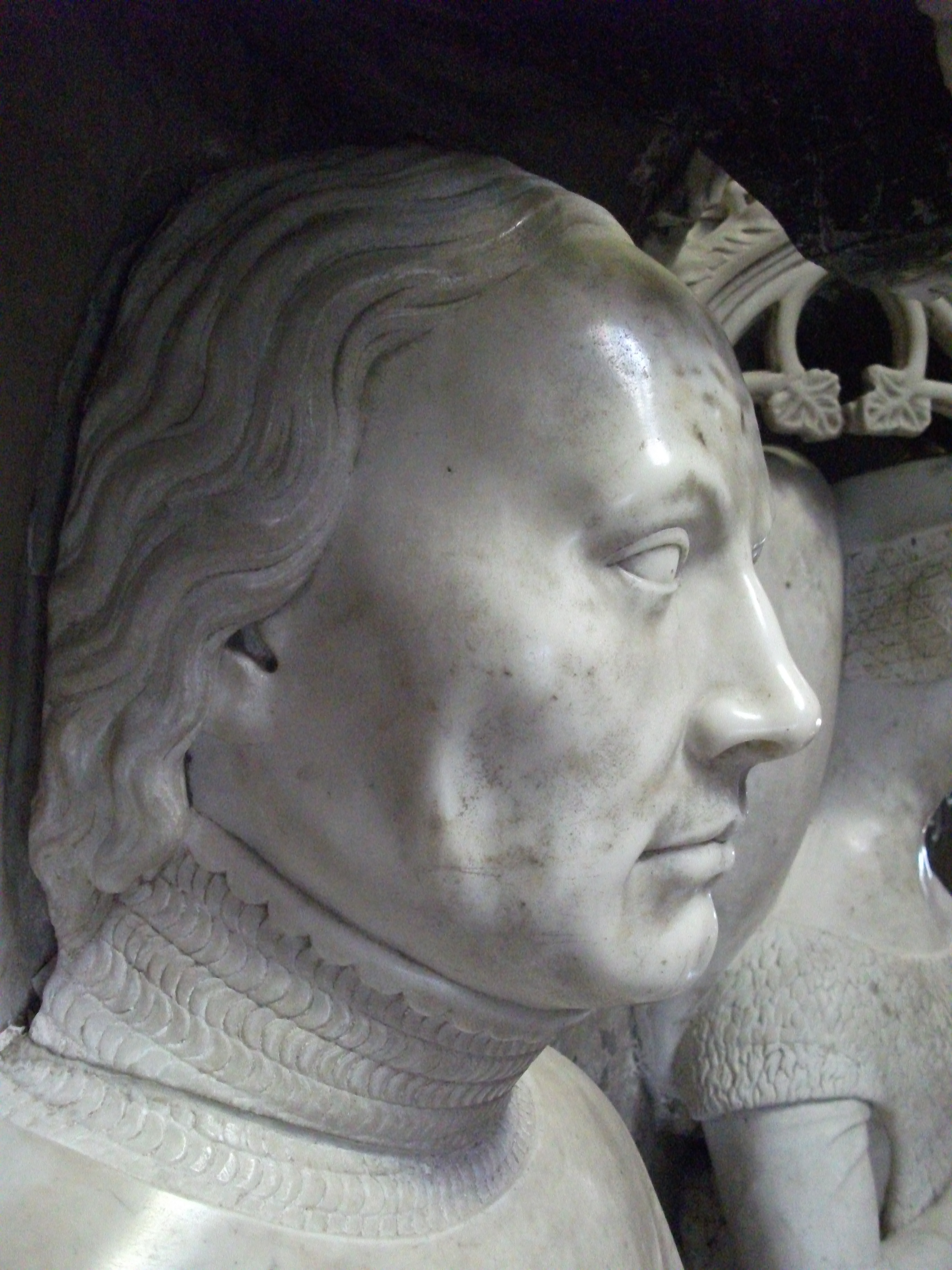
Olivier V de Clisson depicted on his tomb Basilique Notre Dame du Roncier, Josselin, Brittany.

==== Treaty of Brétigny ====
Under the reign of the new King, John II "The Good" of France, Olivier was reconciled to the French Crown in 1360 as part of the Treaty of Brétigny, drafted on 8 May. Officially ratified on 24 October of that year, this treaty, which had been renamed the Treaty of Calais, sought to defuse sources of conflict between France and England, opening a nine-year truce between the two Kingdoms. As a part of its pursuit to eliminate the reasons for the two countries' animosity, such as the grievances Olivier's family had against the French Monarchy, this treaty, in an attempt to rectify these wrongs, posthumously reinstated the honour of Olivier's father, allowing his relatives to regain the rights and privileges their family's nobility had once provided them.

==== First marriage ====
In the same year, Olivier also married Catherine of Laval and Châteaubriant, heiress of the family Laval, and granddaughter of the Duke Arthur II. He therefore became first cousin of both Ducal claimants:

- John IV de Montfort and
- Joan, Duchess of Brittany, wife of Charles de Blois,

This also made Olivier a relative of the King of France. This alliance opened up new political possibilities. The marriage produced two daughters:

- Beatrice of Laval, lady Villemomble
- Margaret

==== War continues ====
In 1363 Olivier was still on the side of the Breton-English Montfortists and one of the commanders of the Montfort troops who failed to take Nantes, but managed to hold Bécherel.

==== Capture of the French king ====
In 1364 several months after the accession of another French king, Charles V, John IV took advantage of the troubled situation in France since the capture of King John II the Good and was assisted by the English under John Chandos, the commander who had decided the battle of Poitiers.

==== Death of Charles de Blois ====
In 1365 John IV besieged the city of Auray. The two opposing Breton armies clashed under the walls of the city on 29 September. Monfortistes were entrenched there and John IV attempted to overcome the numerical inferiority of his army by attacking the Breton-French camp by surprise. The Breton-English commander, however, adopted a proposal from Olivier and waited for the Breton-French army to climb a slope leading to Auray. They managed to divide the troops of Charles de Blois and were fought separately. Isolated from the bulk of his army, Charles de Blois was surrounded and killed in the melee, while Bertrand du Guesclin, the French Commander, was captured but released later with a ransom in 1365. The Breton War of Succession ended with this battle and Olivier had played an important role. Olivier was however injured and lost the use of one eye, earning him the nickname "the one-eyed man of Auray".

==== First Treaty of Guérande ====
The widow of Charles de Blois, Joan, Duchess of Brittany, acceded to these events, and peace talks between the houses of Blois and Montfort started. John IV was nicknamed the Conqueror and was recognized as the only Duke of Brittany. Olivier, while nursing his injury learnt that John IV had given the English commander, John Chandos, the Gâvre castle and forest, a reward Olivier coveted for his loyal service. Olivier expressed his displeasure at the new Duke, but this did not change the matter. Olivier evidently raged "I would rather give myself to the devil than have an English neighbor" A fortnight later, the Gâvre castle was surprisingly burnt down. In response to this, Duke John IV confiscated the lordship of Châteauceaux from Olivier.

In 1366 Olivier was sent to Paris as the Breton ambassador to ensure that Charles V, King of France, complied to the guarantees of the status of an independent Brittany. On 22 May Olivier was received with great fanfare in Paris.

=== Battle of Castile ===
In 1367 Olivier participated, with the English General Robert Knolles under command of the Edward the Black Prince, at the battle of Nájera (Castile) and faced troops commanded by the French Constable du Guesclin. The French lost this battle and du Guesclin was captured for the second time.

=== Change of allegiances ===
In the spring of 1369, Olivier advised the French King in planning a possible invasion of England, to avoid the winter storms of the Channel given the weakness of the French fleet.

In August of the same year, Olivier failed to take Saint-Sauveur-le-Vicomte for the English, since he was forced to decamp and to negotiate on behalf of Duke John IV with King Charles V.

King Charles V apparently secured the full services of Olivier at this stage by paying him with properties in Normandy. It is with these lands that Olivier exchanged for the lordship of Josselin with the Count of Alençon, his cousin in 1370. A few months later, Olivier formalised his change of allegiance, by signing a charter establishing the suzerainty of the King of France over Josselin, even though it was located in the heart of Brittany. For his part, Duke John IV expressed his displeasure with Olivier in this regard.

Coat of arms of France

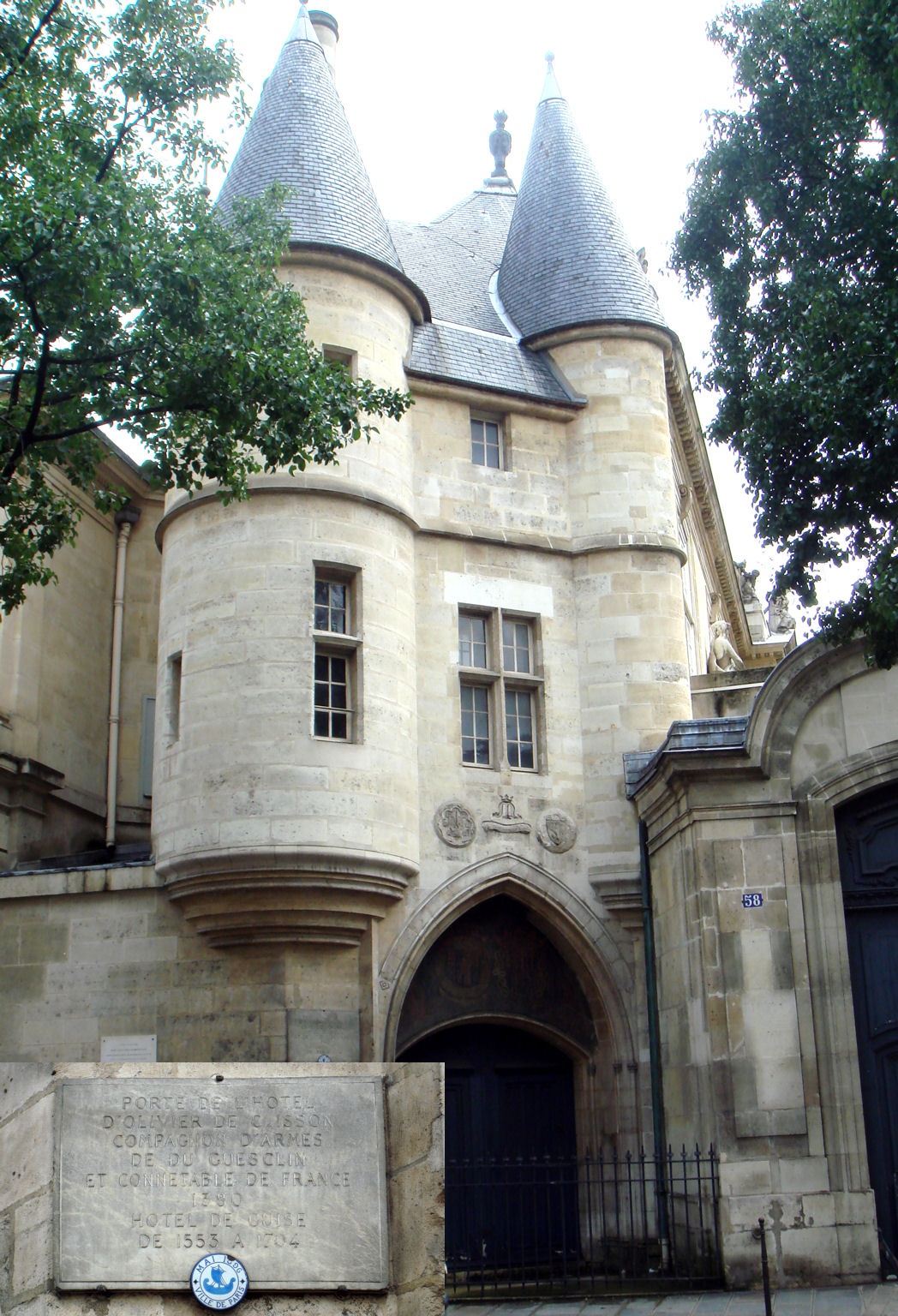
Entrance gate of Clisson's residence, rue des Archives, Paris, with plaque.

Having acquired the lordship of Josselin, Olivier began to build Josselin Castle in 1370, an imposing new fortress with eight towers. In the same year, he joined Bertrand du Guesclin, the constable of France, and followed him in campaigns against the English, including the Siege of Brest in 1373.

In 1370 King Charles V requested Olivier to plunder English-controlled southwest France. On 23 October, Olivier allied now with du Guesclin, by the oath of Pontorson, defeated the English at the Battle of Pontvallain, The oath between the new allies stated that the benefits of any gains would be shared. This alliance was indicative of the general state of vassalage links of the era, leading to situations where these links were intertwined and inextricable, each becoming free to choose sides in the interests of the moment. The brotherhood of arms had become greater than the vassal relationship, Olivier respected the oath with Du Guesclin. From this pact, Olivier formally became a Valois, the murderers of his father.

In the same year, during a raid by the English General Robert Knolles outside Paris, Olivier advised the King in a cautious tactic, a defensive strategy to avoid a pitched battle as the French were not sufficiently prepared; Knowles was eventually turned away from capital.

In 1371 the King of France decided to attack the English in their possessions of Guyenne. The Constable and Olivier shared the military command, the former leading the fight in Auvergne and Rouergue, while the second attacked the English positions of Poitou, Saintonge and Anjou during the summer. The English retaliated by leading an expedition against the stronghold of Moncontour, which fell after ten days of siege.

The English controlled cities of Loudun, Saint Jean d'Angely and Saintes were captured in 1372. The people of La Rochelle themselves opened the gates to the French troops. On several occasions, as with Moncontour, the English did not spare prisoners who could pay ransom. The squire of Olivier who was captured in Benon (Saintonge), was tortured and killed. In revenge, Olivier executed fifteen prisoners and developed a reputation for not hesitating to mutilate captive enemies, cutting off arms or legs. du Guesclin evidently remarked "God! The body of St. Benedict, the English are not wrong when they call you the Butcher!"

=== Breton war debt ===
Brittany was at this stage indebted to the English King Edward III. Thomas Melbourne, Treasurer and Receiver General of the Duchy, and other advisors to the Breton Duke were English. Breton Nobles such as Olivier resented this as well as an increasingly popular discontent over the implementation of a permanent ducal tax, the hearth tax. Duke John IV chose to sign a new treaty of alliance with England explaining to France that he was forced to host English troops in order to counter Olivier's militant presence in Brittany.

In 1373 in response to this, King Charles V ordered the Constable on 1 March to seize the Duchy and ensure the support of Olivier, by giving him the lordship of Guillac. Du Guesclin and Olivier started a propaganda war to discredit the Breton nobility of Duke John IV. English troops were stationed in Derval, Rouge, Brest and Saint-Mathieu. Abandoned by most of the Breton nobility, Duke John IV was forced into exile and crossed the English Channel on 28 April 1373.

=== Olivier as co-regent of Brittany ===
Olivier could have claimed the title of Duke, but King Charles V chose to hand over Brittany to his brother, the Duke of Anjou, who was married to a daughter of Charles Penthievre Blois, to head the Duchy, with the title of "lieutenant of the King" This appointment was however honorific, as the Duke of Anjou never entered Brittany. Olivier was subsequently appointed co-regent with a Vicount, John I of Rohan.

The summer of 1373 began with the siege of the castle of Derval, symbolic as this castle was the property of the English General, Robert Knolles.

During the years 1373 to 1377 Duke John IV re-entered Brittany after attaining the services of the English Duke of Lancaster, John of Gaunt to intervene with about ten thousand troops. Duke John IV retook Saint-Pol-de-Léon and besieged Saint-Brieuc. In southern Brittany, Olivier built up military forces, while Duke John IV tried to capture Quimperlé. A truce between the Kings of France and England, however, prevented Olivier from using this force. The siege of Brest lasted from 1373 to 1377; Olivier then built the fortress of Gouesnou to prohibit access to the city by the sea. At this stage, Brest was the last city under English occupation in Brittany.

In 1378 King Charles V made the political choice to fully annex Brittany to the Kingdom of France in 18 December, causing a reversal of the independence of the Breton nobility, including Joan, Duchess of Brittany, as the Treaty of Guérande had not been respected. King Charles V petitioned four Breton lords to give their opinion on the subject:

- Guy XII de Laval refused to fight against Duke John IV,
- Vicount Rohan timidly promised his help,
- Clisson and du Guesclin affirmed their loyalty to the Valois cause.

Duke John IV on his return from exile found support in Brittany and a Breton provisional government was created to meet with the King of France. Olivier saw an opportunity to take the title of Duke but failed again to convince the King of France as Duke John IV again had a secret arrangements with the then King of England, Richard II. Duke John IV therefore reclaimed his seat of Brittany except the land held by Olivier, including Nantes.

Olivier V de Clisson personal blason

=== Second marriage ===
Widowed, Olivier, in 1378, married his second wife Marguerite de Rohan (1330-1406), a daughter of Alain VII Rohan. Marguerite was the widow of Jean de Beaumanoir, a hero of the Breton nobility, who faced the English at the battle of Trent, she had three daughters. A sister of Clisson, Isabeau, is also united in 1338 to Jean Rieux. With these unions, Olivier V is linked to the largest noble families of Brittany.

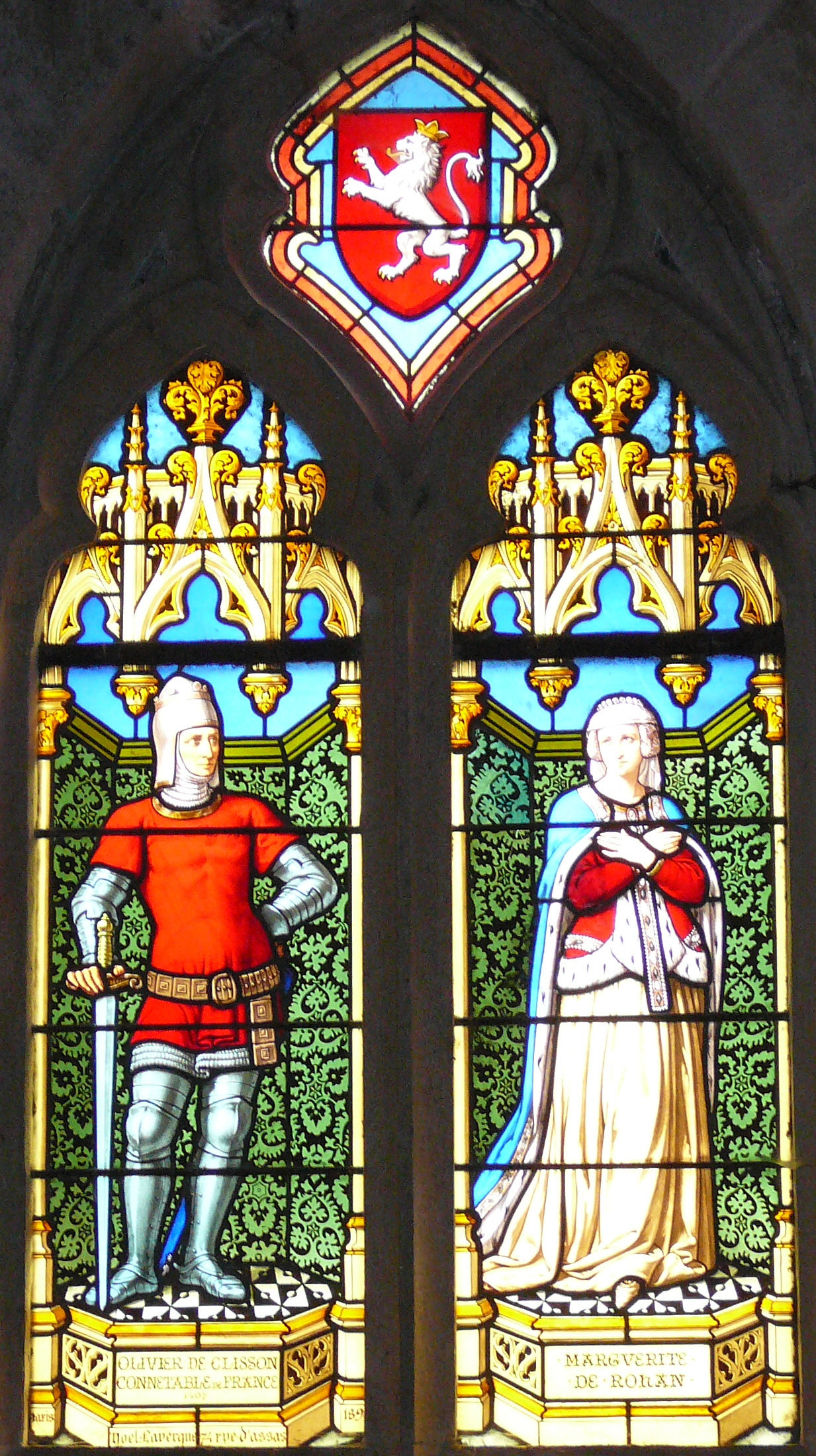
Church window detail of Olivier V and Margaret de Clisson at Josselin, Brittany

=== Constable of France ===
In 1380 after the death of du Guesclin, King Charles VI, crowned at the age of twelve, gave Olivier the rank of Constable of France on 28 November, with the support of the Duke of Anjou, but despite the opposition of the Dukes of Berry and Burgundy, all three uncles of the King. Two other candidates declined the offer considering Olivier's experienced warfaring skills. The role of Constable gave the holder the right to keep loot of war apart from gold, silver, and prisoners. Olivier received the Constable's sword, and held the office from 1380 to 1392.

=== Second Treaty of Guerande ===
In 1381 the second Treaty of Guérande of 4 April normalised relations between the Duchy of Brittany and the Kingdom of France, Duke John IV and Olivier signed a treaty of "good allies" on 30 May 1381, which was reaffirmed on 27 February 1382.

=== Flanders campaign ===
In 1382, following a revolt in Flanders challenging feudal power, King Charles VI of France decided to intervene and assist his ally, the Count of Flanders, Louis de Male. Olivier led the French Royal army on 27 November to victory in the Battle of Roosebeke during which twenty-five thousand men were massacred. The Constable was able to gain a tactical advantage against the inexperienced bourgeois militias, artisans, and merchants who were crushed by the seasoned French troops, who then engaged in massive looting.

The Flemish uprising caused secondary emancipatory desires in Paris itself. A decision to reinstate a tax which had been abolished by the previous King, started a revolt from the citizens of Paris, the Maillotins uprising, in March 1382. King Charles VI's absence from Paris while supporting his troops in Flanders gave hope to the revolters that royal power had weakened. King Charles VI's victory in Flanders and return to Paris, however, changed the situation as the Parisians chose not to confront the King. In February 1383 Olivier stated to them that they appeared to be rich and bourgeois, and stated: "Corps and property, you are in case of forfeiture. See what you choose: justice or mercy." They chose mercy, that is to say, the payment of a large sum depending on the fortunes of each person. The King's entourage was magnanimous and eventually abandoned a portion of these "fines".

=== Marriage of daughter ===
In 1384 the treaty Olivier had with Duke John IV did not prevent him to pay the ransom of John I, Count of Penthièvre, son of Charles de Blois, who was held hostage in England. Moreover, Olivier betrothed his daughter Margaret, to him.

It appears that Olivier was positioning his family as under the terms of the Treaty of Guérande, if Duke John IV had no male child, Jean de Blois, son of Joan, Duchess of Brittany, would then be the Ducal heir apparent.

=== England invasion project ===
In 1384 Olivier conceived a project to invade England using a huge fortified raft. One thousand three hundred ships were gathered and protected by ninety-seven warships. This very expensive operation was not successful: At the time of its completion, in December 1386, the Duke of Berry, one of the King's uncles, delayed and prevented the smooth running of the operation, especially as the main supporter, the Duke of Burgundy, had fallen ill. Bad weather also prevented the project, which was finally abandoned in 1387.

=== First assassination attempt ===
In 1387 Olivier was invited by Duke John IV to attend a session of the Parliament of Brittany in Vannes, to inaugurate the castle of Hermine, which Duke John IV had built. On 27 June 1387 the Constable was seized and imprisoned, and the Duke ordered that Olivier be sealed in a bag and thrown into the water. This order, however, was not followed by Jehan Bazvalan, the weapons master of Duke John IV, who was content to keep him locked up. In the morning, Duke John IV asked about the fate of Olivier, and John Bazvalan admitted the non-execution of the order. Olivier eventually agreed to pay a large sum and to give to Duke John IV the forts of Blain, Josselin and Jugon Le Guildo.

In 1388 the King of France traded with the Duke for Olivier and restored the confiscated lands to the Constable, but not the ransom. This was to spare the Duke from humiliation and again becoming a fulcrum for the English.

=== Government marmousets ===
Since the King was only twelve years old, Olivier played a special role, as the historian Françoise Autrand qualified, as an "uncle". By 1388 at the age of fifteen, King Charles VI decided to govern without his real uncle. The Constable was now part of a group which headed the government, included with Olivier were:

- the chamberlain of Charles V Bureau de La Rivière
- Jean Le Mercier promoted to grand master of Hotel King
- John Montaigu

This political episode is known as the "government of the marmousets".

=== Heir to Brittany ===
In 1389 the King encouraged leaders of noble Breton families such as Olivier to apply for the title of Duke of Brittany, if Duke John IV had no male heir. The Duke of Brittany, however, did produce a son with Jeanne de Navarre, who was also named Jean and was born on 24 December.

=== Second assassination attempt ===
In 1392 on Olivier's return to Paris, an attempt was made to assassinate him by Pierre de Craon, allegedly at the instigation of Duke John IV. Craon waylaid Olivier in a narrow street. Olivier's unarmed servants fled, but Olivier was saved from death by his chainmail coat, and was able to draw his sword and fend off his attackers. In the struggle, he fell from his horse and was knocked out against the door of a baker's shop. Believing him dead, Craon fled Paris for Brittany.

=== Refuge in Brittany ===
In order to punish Duke John IV and Craon, King Charles VI, accompanied by the Constable, marched on Brittany, but it was on this expedition that the King was seized with a bout of madness. The uncles of King Charles VI blamed Olivier for his breakdown. During King Charles VI's dementia phase, the King's uncle was returned to power. The Parliament condemned Olivier on 10 December 1392 for having illegally enriched himself, banished Olivier from the Kingdom, fined him two hundred thousand pounds, and demanded the return of the sword of Constable. Olivier refused to return the sword, and sought refuge in the castle of Montlhéry, and in Brittany in his castle of Josselin.

Duke John IV wanted to ingratiate the favor of France, and thus besieged Josselin. By 1394 King Charles VI however restored confidence in Olivier and although Philip of Artois succeeded him in 1392, the King confirmed his function as the Constable. In 1397 Louis de Sancerre was also appointed Constable, replacing the deceased Philippe of Artois, Count of Eu, but Olivier retained the privilege of being the holder of the Constable sword. By 1397 Olivier had also formed a secondary Royal alliance with Louis d'Orleans, brother of King Charles VI.

=== Reconciliation with Duke John IV and Protector of Brittany ===
After thirty years of conflict, Olivier, through the Duke of Bourgogne, was reconciled in 1396 with his overlord Duke John IV. The latter sent his son as a guarantee of his sincerity. They promised peace and good friendship until death. The promise was kept, the two men were at peace when Duke John IV died in 1399. The Dukes son was only ten years old when the regent Joan of Navarre married King Henry IV of England. Louis of Orleans offered to his brother King Charles VI that the government of Brittany be therefore entrusted to Olivier, to prevent it passing under English domination, however Philip the Bold became regent of the Duchy.

Coat of arms of the Dutchy of Brittany

Marguerite de Clisson, daughter of Olivier, nicknamed Margot, sided with her husband John, Count of Penthièvre, against her father, and claimed the Duchy, which attracted the wrath of Olivier, who predicted: "Perverse, you'll ruin your children". This prediction would come true, since two of her sons would be executed for treason after removing the Duke and the third would be imprisoned for twenty five years. The clash of Olivier and his daughter in 1399 gave rise to a legend. In her flight, Marguerite allegedly broke her leg and became lame earning her the nickname "Lame Margot." This legend was probably invented by an opposing faction of the family after 1420.

=== Death ===
After mentioning in his will a wish to return the sword of the Constable, Olivier de Clisson died in Josselin on 23 April 1407 at the age of 71. He was buried in the chapel of the castle of Josselin. His grave was however desecrated in 1793.

== Descendants ==
Clisson had two daughters, born of his union with Catherine de Laval.

- Beatrice (c. 1366–1448), married in 1407 Alain VIII de Rohan. Their son, Alain IX of Rohan, married Margaret, a sister of John V. This branch of the Rohan family had a flourishing destiny and inherited Castle Josselin.
- Marguerite (1366–1441) married on 20 January 1387 John, son of Joan, Duchess of Brittany, and Charles de Blois. Taking up the claims of the Penthièvre family in terms of the ducal throne, she kidnapped John V, son of John IV, Duke of Brittany. She was defeated and her property was confiscated by John V.
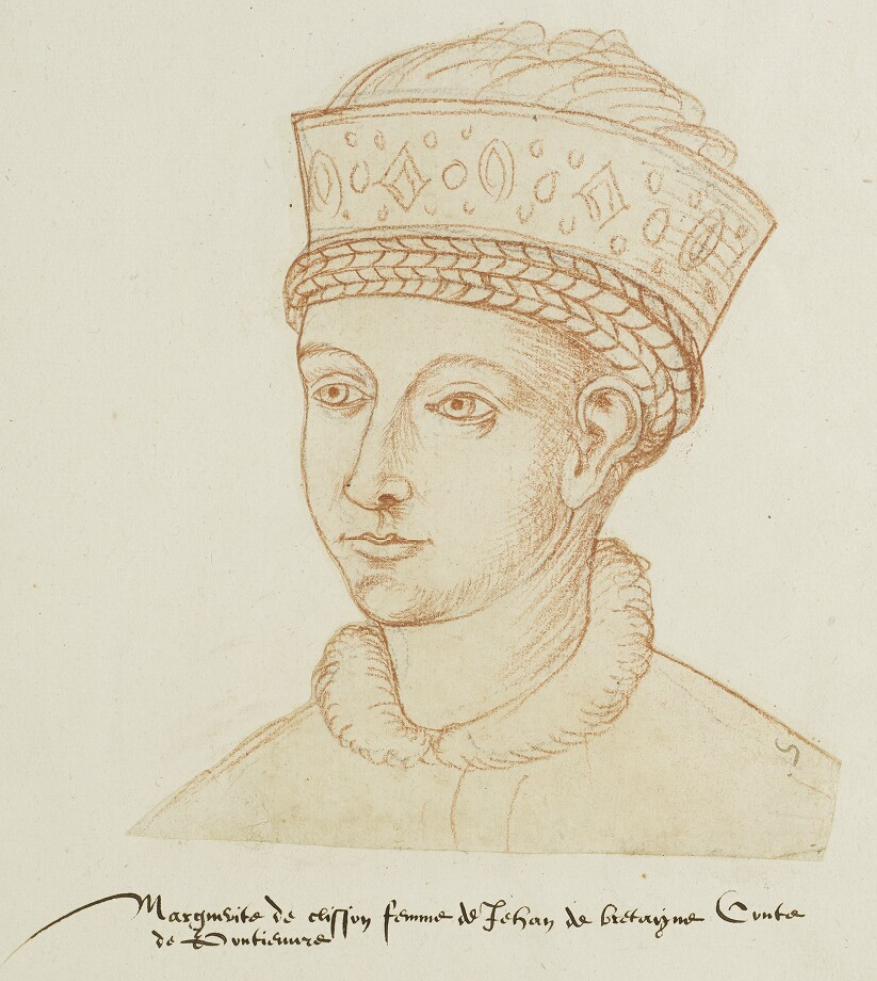
  Marguerite de Clisson

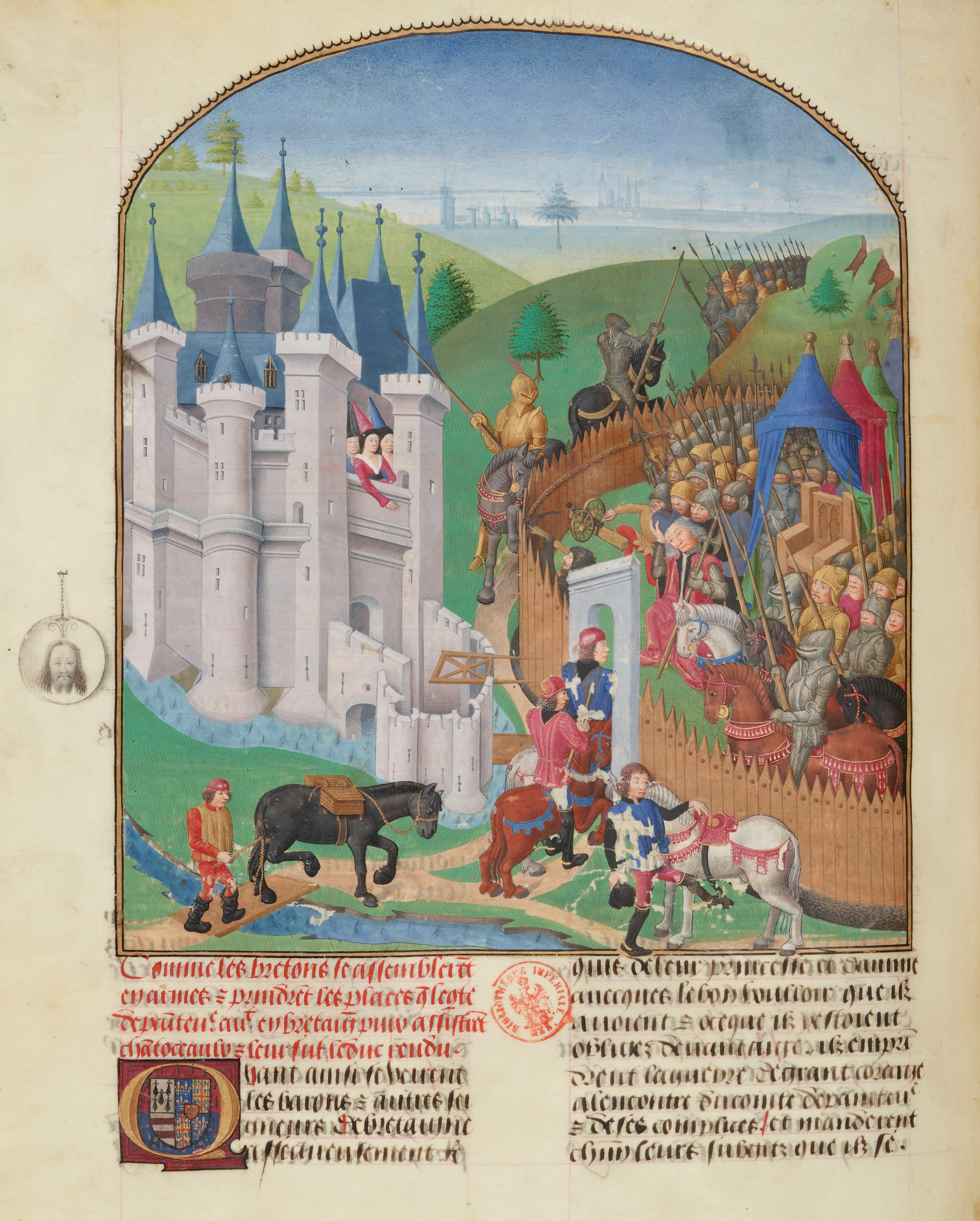
Surrender of Maguerite de Clisson (1420)

== Fortune ==
Depending on the items specified in his will, Yvonig Gicquel estimated that the annual revenues of Olivier in 1400 were around five hundred million Francs, representing about one hundred and eighty million euros in 2013 terms. When estimating his property, his heritage and his fortune was estimated at six tons of gold and sixty tons of silver.

== See also ==
- Robert Knolles

== Sources ==
- Henneman, John Bell (2018). Olivier de Clisson and Political Society in France Under Charles V and Charles VI. University of Pennsylvania Press.
