= Battle of Pontvallain =

1370 Hundred Years' War battle

- Part of the Hundred Years' War
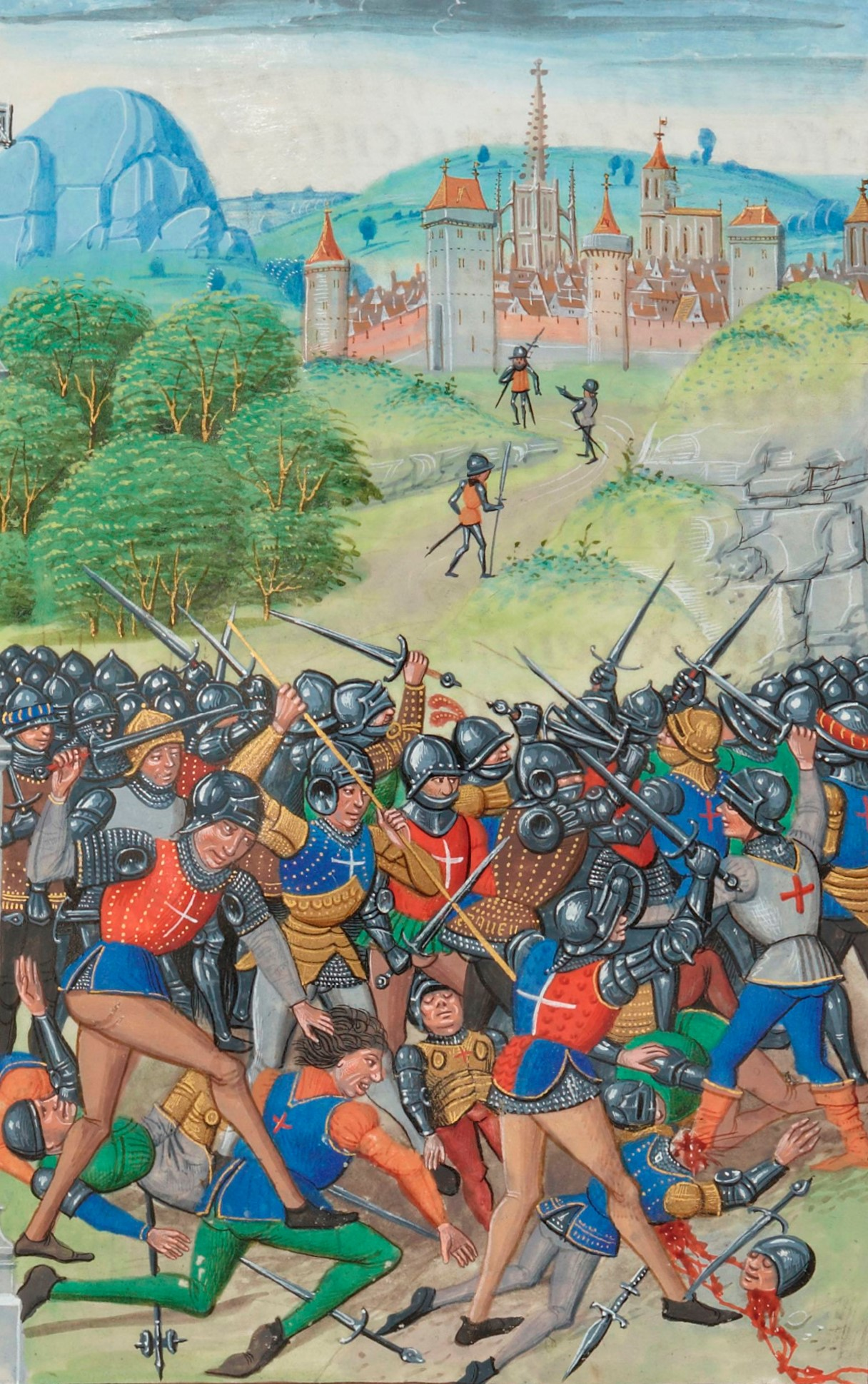
- The Battle of Pontvallain, from an illuminated manuscript of Froissart's Chronicles
Date	4 December 1370
Location	Pontvallain, Sarthe, north-west France 47°46′08″N 00°12′25″E
Result	French victory

Belligerents
France	England

Commanders and leaders
Bertrand Du Guesclin; Louis de Sancerre	Robert Knolles; Thomas Grandison; Walter Fitzwalter; John Minsterworth

Strength
5,200	4,000–6,000

Casualties and losses
Light	Most of the English army

The Battle of Pontvallain, part of the Hundred Years' War, took place in the Sarthe region of north-west France on 4 December 1370, when a French army under Bertrand du Guesclin heavily defeated an English force which had broken away from an army commanded by Sir Robert Knolles. The French numbered 5,200 men, and the English force was approximately the same size.

The English had plundered and burnt their way across northern France from Calais to Paris. With winter coming, the English commanders fell out and divided their army into four. The battle consisted of two separate engagements: one at Pontvallain where, after a forced march, which continued overnight, Guesclin, the newly appointed constable of France, surprised a major part of the English force, and wiped it out. In a coordinated attack, Guesclin's subordinate, Louis de Sancerre, caught a smaller English force the same day, at the nearby town of Vaas, also wiping it out. The two are sometimes named as separate battles.

The French harried the surviving Englishmen into the following year, recapturing much lost territory. Though the engagements were comparatively small, they were significant because the English were routed, ending a reputation for invincibility in open battle they had enjoyed since the war started in 1337.

== Background ==
Following a series of disagreements between Philip VI of France (r. 1328–1350) and Edward III of England (r. 1327–1377), on 24 May 1337 Philip's Great Council in Paris agreed that the lands held by Edward in France should be taken back into Philip's hands on the grounds that Edward was in breach of his obligations as a vassal. This marked the start of the Hundred Years' War, which was to last 116 years. In 1340 Edward claimed the French crown, proclaiming himself the rightful heir through his mother, Isabella of France.

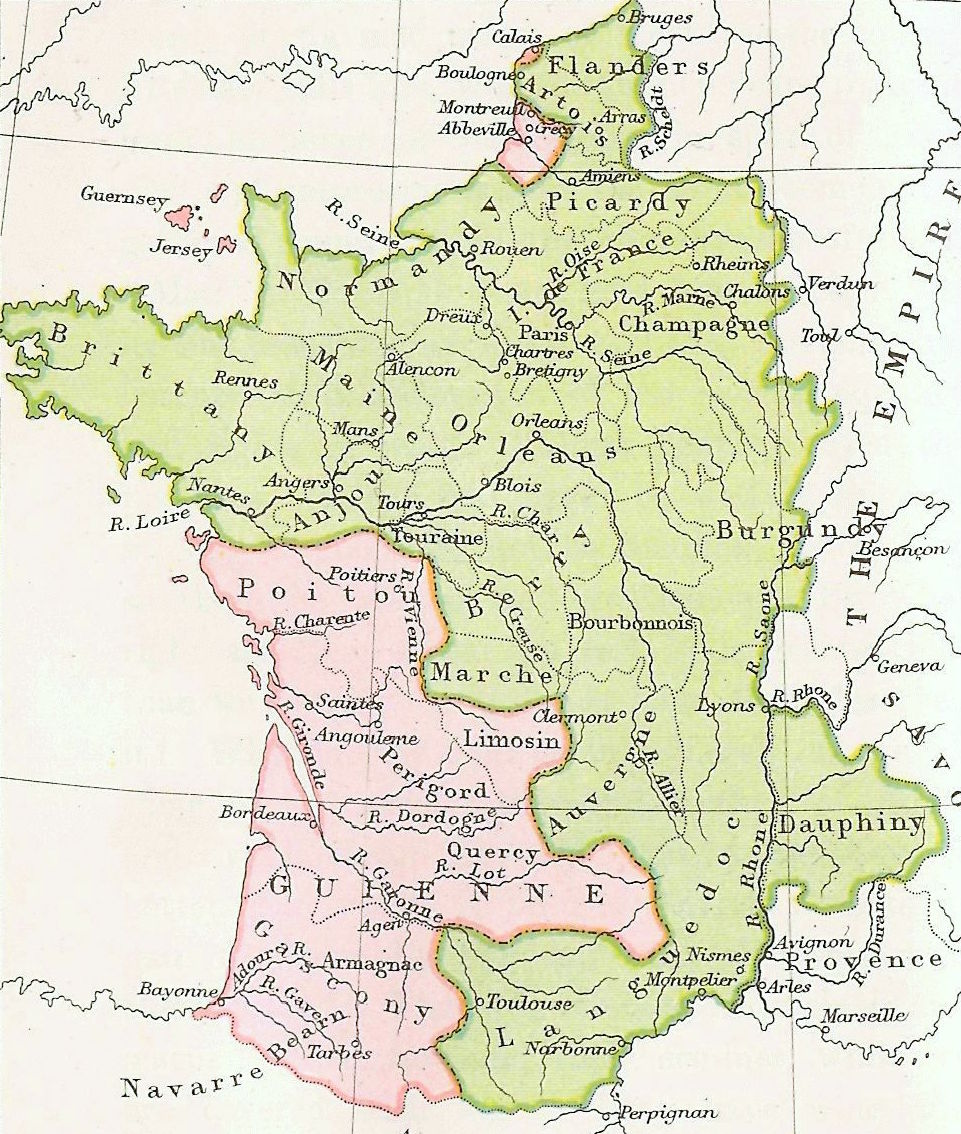
France after the Treaty of Brétigny – French territory in green, English territory in pink

The English campaigned frequently on the continent, gaining a long run of military successes against larger forces across France. In 1356 a large French army was decisively defeated at the Battle of Poitiers, in which King John II of France (r. 1350–1364), the son and successor of King Philip, was captured. This eventually led to peace being agreed, and the Treaty of Brétigny was signed in 1360. It ceded large parts of south-west France to England as its sovereign territory, while Edward renounced all claims to the French throne. The terms of Brétigny were meant to untangle the feudal responsibilities that had caused so much conflict, and, as far as the English were concerned, would concentrate their territory in an expanded version of Aquitaine. This had been part of the English royal estate in France since the reign of Henry II (r. 1154–1189), and by the treaty it and Poitou became fiefdoms of Edward's oldest son, Edward the Black Prince. John was to pay three million écus as his ransom. (Note: Approximately £450,000,000 in 2025 terms. UK Retail Price Index inflation figures are based on data from Clark, Gregory (2019). "The Annual RPI and Average Earnings for Britain, 1209 to Present (New Series)". MeasuringWorth. Retrieved 14 November 2019. To give a very rough idea of earning power, an English foot-soldier could expect to earn £1 in wages for, usually seasonal, military service in approximately three months.) The French were deeply unhappy with this arrangement.

In 1369, on the pretext that Edward had failed to observe the terms of the treaty, Charles V (r. 1364–1380), the son and heir of King John, declared war once again. In August a French offensive attempted to recapture castles in Normandy. Men who had fought in earlier English campaigns, and had already won fortune and fame, were summoned from their retirements, and new, younger men were given commands. Events went poorly for England almost from the start: James Audley and John Chandos, two important English commanders, were killed in the first six months; while the French made territorial gains in the west, re-occupying the strategic provincial capital of Poitiers and capturing many castles.

=== French strategy ===
This period of the Hundred Years' War, starting in 1369 and known as the Carolinian phase, was significantly different from the previous one. The French were well-prepared militarily, and immediately went on the offensive. Charles was well-situated in terms of financial and human resources. Edward III was growing senile, his heir was crippled by illness, and once the turmoil of the previous phase of the war had subsided, Charles was able to benefit from France having three times the population and wealth of England. The French also benefited from technological improvements, such as in barding, the armouring of horses.

Fighting during this phase took place largely in Aquitaine, meaning the English had extremely long borders to defend. These were easy for small French parties to penetrate, which they did to great effect. They relied on Fabian tactics: avoiding pitched battles and using attrition to wear down the English and only attacking dispersed or isolated English forces. This was now an offensive war for the French, and the English were ill-prepared for it.

=== English strategy ===
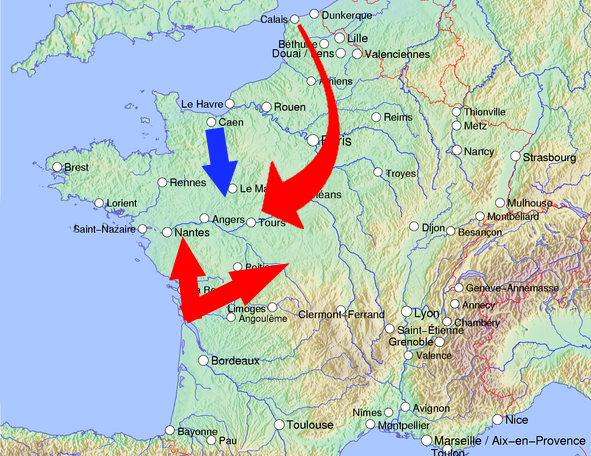
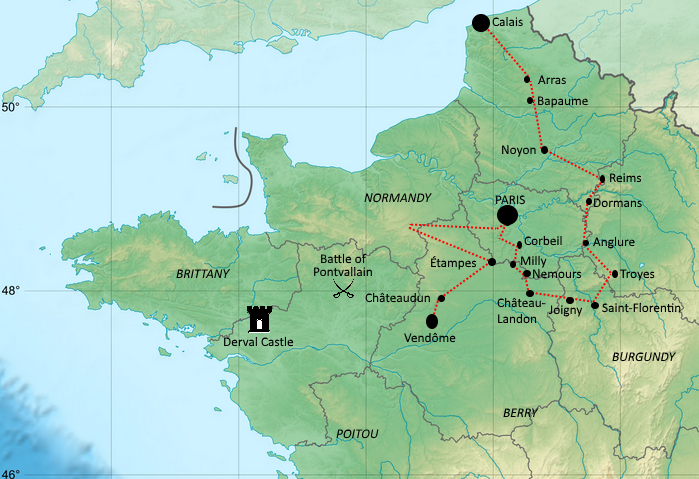
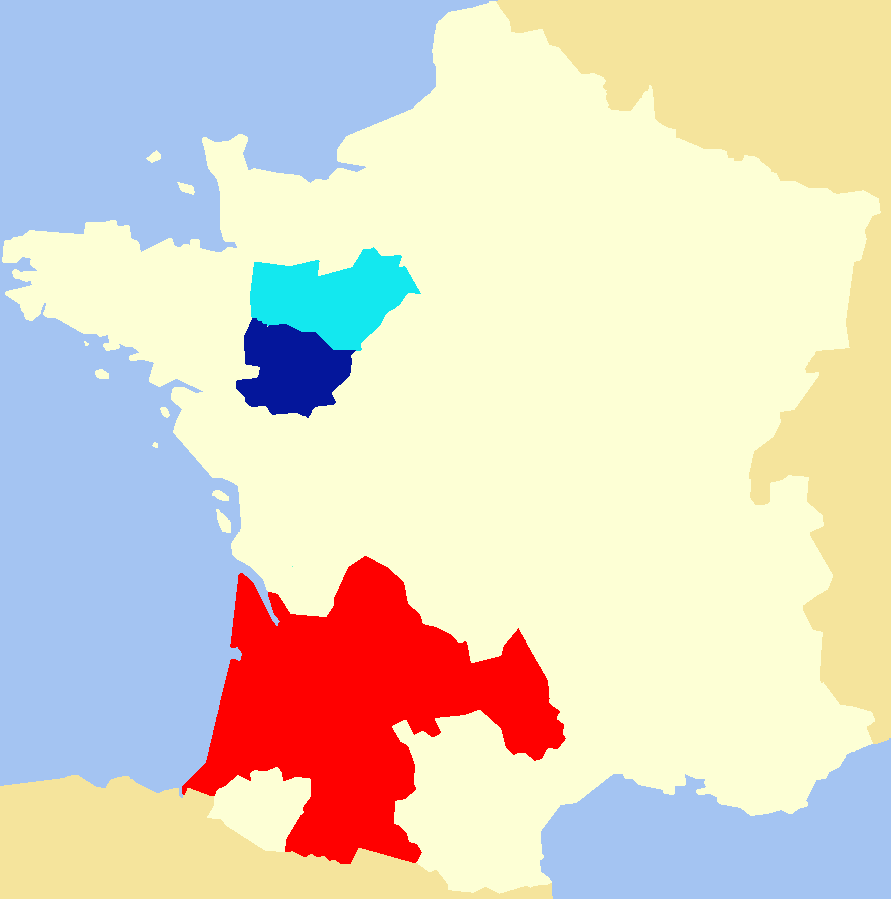

The English planned to use two armies. One would operate out of Aquitaine in south-west France and be commanded by the experienced Black Prince. It would concentrate on reversing recent French gains in Poitou. This force was hampered by the Black Prince being so ill that he had to be transported in a litter. As a result, he was unable to lead the campaign personally and needed to delegate command. The other English force would operate out of the English enclave of Calais in northern France.

The north-eastern army was to be commanded by Sir Robert Knolles, a veteran with considerable experience of independent command in the previous phase of the war and in the Breton War of Succession. Knolles contracted on 20 June to lead the King's army, although a week earlier he had agreed to share the command with Sir Alan Buxhull, Sir Thomas Grandison and Sir John Bourchier. On 1 July they were jointly appointed King's lieutenants. Both the King and his council were aware of the problems that could be caused by giving the overall command to Knolles, whose social status was lower than that of his peers. To prevent the English army from dividing and going separate ways – and in what the historian Jonathan Sumption calls "a prescient precaution" – the captains were required to sign a contract before they left agreeing not only to serve the King faithfully, but also not to allow any divisions to open up between them, and to make decisions collectively.

== Prelude ==
=== English movements ===
Knolles landed at Calais in August 1370 with an army of between 4,000 and 6,000 mounted men. There he awaited further orders from the King. None were forthcoming, so he proceeded on a "meandering" plundering raid through northern France. According to the historian T. F. Tout, the French allowed Knolles and his army "to wander where he would". (Note: He was following, almost exactly, the route of King Edward's great chevauchée of 1359.) Knolles crossed north-eastern France using what by now was a traditional English tactic, the chevauchée – a large-scale mounted raid. This was intended not only to inflict as much destruction as possible on the countryside they passed through, but, by doing so, draw out the French army into a pitched battle. Journeying through the Somme region, Knolles made a show of force outside Reims, marched to Troyes, and then swung west to approach Paris from the direction of Nemours. As they marched, Knolles's army captured many towns, which they would then raze if the French refused to pay the ransoms the English demanded. (Note: On a previous campaign in 1357–1360, Knolles used the same tactic with profitable results. Michael Jones has described how on that occasion Knolles's army "left a trail of ravaged villages, whose charred gables were known as 'Knolles' mitres' "; and how, as a result, Knolles made around £15,000 in booty.) He reached Paris on 24 September, but the city was well garrisoned and well defended. Knolles could not enter, and the French defenders would not leave their positions. He tried to draw them out to fight them in the open, but the French would not take the bait. The contemporary Chronique des Règnes de Jean II et de Charles V describes how, even though "the said English set fire to a great number of villages around Paris ... the King was advised, for the better, that they should not then be fought with."

By October Knolles had moved south and was marching towards Vendôme. He captured and garrisoned castles and monasteries between the Rivers Loir and Loire and positioned himself to be able to march into either Poitou or southern Normandy. The former would enable him to support the Black Prince; the latter might be necessary if Edward concluded an agreement with Charles of Navarre, who was offering his lands in northern Normandy as a base for the English. Many of the subordinate captains, who considered themselves better-born than Knolles, deplored his apparent lack of martial spirit. They found a leader in Sir John Minsterworth, an ambitious but unstable knight from the Welsh Marches, who mocked Knolles as "the old freebooter". Much of Knolles's strategy was based on that employed in the campaigns of the 1340s and 1350s; particularly the capturing of enemy fortresses, to either garrison them with English troops or levy a ransom. (Note: This included the creation of reventions, or ransom districts, especially in the counties of Anjou and Maine. The French behaved similarly when they attacked English-controlled territories.) Meanwhile, the English campaign in the west, which was nominally commanded by the Black Prince and actually by John of Gaunt and the Earl of Pembroke, captured Limoges after a five-day siege, taking many prisoners, whom they held for ransom, and seizing much booty. (Note: This campaign would also suffer from divided leadership: The Earl of Pembroke, young and with "aristocratic arrogance" refused to serve alongside Sir John Chandos, who, although of great military experience and fame, was only a knight banneret in rank. Pembroke's jealousy of Chandos was possibly exacerbated by the fact that as Jonathan Sumption put it, Pembroke "may have had the grander name but his inexperience showed.")

=== Divisions among the English ===
And before the feast of Christmas, the chief men of the army, out of envy and self-importance, split into four parts, to the great harm of England, and great comfort of the enemies: that is to say, the Lord of Grandison with his men in one part, the Lord FitzWalter in another, and Sir John Minsterworth in the third part, and Sir Robert Knolles in the fourth.

— The Anonimalle Chronicle, 64–65.

The English system of shared leadership led to jealousies between their captains regarding how the booty and the many ransoms they had collected should be distributed. (Note: The French chronicler Pierre d'Orgemont wrote in Chroniques des regnes de Jean II et Charles V that as Knolles's army marched through northern France burning the wheat and "great houses", the English "did not, however, burn anything for which a ransom was paid.") In November 1370 acrimony broke out among the English captains over the issue of where to spend the winter. Knolles was aware that the French were closing in, and of the risk this posed. Not wishing to stay encamped in an area where a surprise attack was possible, he proposed withdrawing westward into Brittany. His captains, led by Sir Alan Buxhull, strongly disagreed, preferring to find winter quarters where they were. This would enable them to be able to continue raiding the surrounding countryside. They were confident they could defeat any French attack. Their concern to keep pillaging the countryside was in large part forced upon them: the government had only paid their and their army's wages for thirteen weeks, and they were expected not just to live off the land, but pay themselves from it. (Note: This was an innovative method of recruitment; no English government had attempted "contractual service without pay" before. It has been described as the government attempting to reduce its own cost of making war by relying on "the lure of profits" to make soldiering more attractive. If the system worked, it was because "the prospects of profits was deep-rooted in the military mentality and that the government was well aware of this and keen to take advantage of it.")

Knolles threatened to leave, and when the other English commanders refused to join him, did so, taking the largest retinue from the army with him – "doubtless with considerable booty", remarks the medievalist Kenneth Fowler. With Knolles gone, the remaining 4,000 men of the English force divided into three forces. One was under the dual command of Thomas Grandison and Hugh Calveley, the other two were commanded by Walter Fitzwalter and John Minsterworth. These three forces, in turn, went separate ways, which maximised their opportunities to forage for supplies and to loot. Fowler suggests that Minsterworth was probably the first to leave. On the evening of 3 December, Knolles was some way to the west, Grandison's force of between 600 and 1,200 was spread out along a river between Pontvallain and Mayet, and Fitzwalter was several miles to the south. The location of Minsterworth's force is no longer known.

=== French movements ===
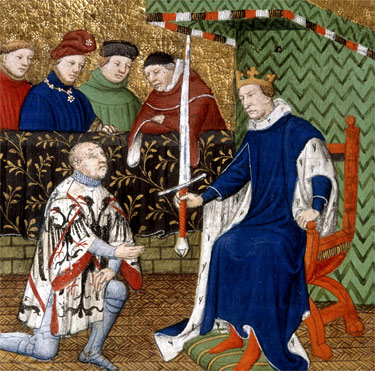
Bertrand du Guesclin is appointed constable of France by King Charles V in 1370; from a contemporary manuscript.

Bertrand du Guesclin was appointed constable of France on 2 October, in direct response to Knolles's campaign. Charles considered that Guesclin had the necessary skills in leading small forces and in irregular warfare to implement the Fabian approach he had decided on. On 24 October, Guesclin sealed a "pact of brotherhood-in-arms" with Olivier de Clisson, an experienced Breton commander, and by 6 November Guesclin was in Caen raising an army. Guesclin concentrated his forces at Caen during November, and was joined there by reinforcements under the Marshals Mouton de Blainville and Arnoul d'Audrehem as well as a Breton contingent under de Clisson. Guesclin thus concentrated about 4,000 men.

A second force of about 1,200 men assembled at Châtellerault, under Marshal Sancerre. This then moved towards the English from the east, while Guesclin began to move on him from the north. On 1 December Guesclin left Caen with his army – "One of those marches of which he had the secret", said a contemporary chronicler, – and marched south. One of the most important aspects of the Pontvallain campaign was the speed with which the French moved: Guesclin and his forces reached Le Mans, a journey of 100 miles (160 km), two days later.

== Battle ==
=== Battle of Pontvallain ===
At Le Mans, Guesclin received intelligence that Grandison's force was nearby at Mayet, but was on the move in an attempt to join with Knolles. Guesclin, however, outmanoeuvred him. Despite his army being near-exhausted, Guesclin commenced a night march, which brought him to Pontvallain by the early morning of 4 December. The French were able to attack Grandison's army with no warning, which was a great psychological advantage to them. The English were taken by surprise and Sumption speculates that Grandison may only have had time to form rough lines with his men before fierce close-quarters fighting began. In the earlier phase of the war, English longbowmen had largely neutralised the French cavalry but in this encounter, the barding (armouring) of the French horses rendered the English archery largely ineffective. The English attempted an escape through the woods, but were unable to retreat northwards, where the slightly higher ground may have provided them with a defensible position. Soon, with heavy losses on both sides, Grandison's force was penned in and wiped out beneath the walls of the Château de la Faigne.

Among the French casualties was the Marshal of France, Arnoul d'Audrehem, who was mortally wounded. The English army died almost to a man. Grandison and his captains, who included Philip Courtenay and Hugh Despenser, were among the few survivors, and were taken prisoner by Guesclin. With Grandison's defeat, the largest remaining English force in the area was Fitzwalter's. Sancerre, who was still "a few hours march away", on receiving news of the battle at Pontvallain turned south to confront Fitzwalter. Guesclin, meanwhile, organised his prisoners, sent a portion of his army to chase Knolles, and moved towards Fitzwalter with the balance. Fitzwalter managed to avoid being surprised in open ground as Grandison had been, and marched south, intending to take refuge within the fortified Vaas Abbey.

=== Battle of Vaas ===
The abbey at Vaas was garrisoned by Knolles's men, and Fitzwalter's men assumed it to be a haven. However, the French forces led by Sancerre reached the abbey at nearly the same time as the English. The garrison were unable to organise a proper defence before they had to attempt to fend off an immediate assault from Sancerre. According to Sumption, it is likely that Fitzwalter's force managed to enter the outer gate, but after bitter fighting Sancerre's troops forced their way into the abbey. The English defence, such as it was, collapsed. The arrival of Guesclin effectively put an end to the battle, which became a rout. What Sumption considers reliable estimates attested the English losses to be over 300, exclusive of prisoners. These included Fitzwalter himself, captured by the seneschal of Toulouse, and most of his lieutenants. Guesclin held Fitzwalter as his personal prisoner; possibly, Sumption adds, like the contemporary Pierre d'Orgemont when he related the tale, Guesclin believed Fitzwalter to be the marshal of England.

== Aftermath ==
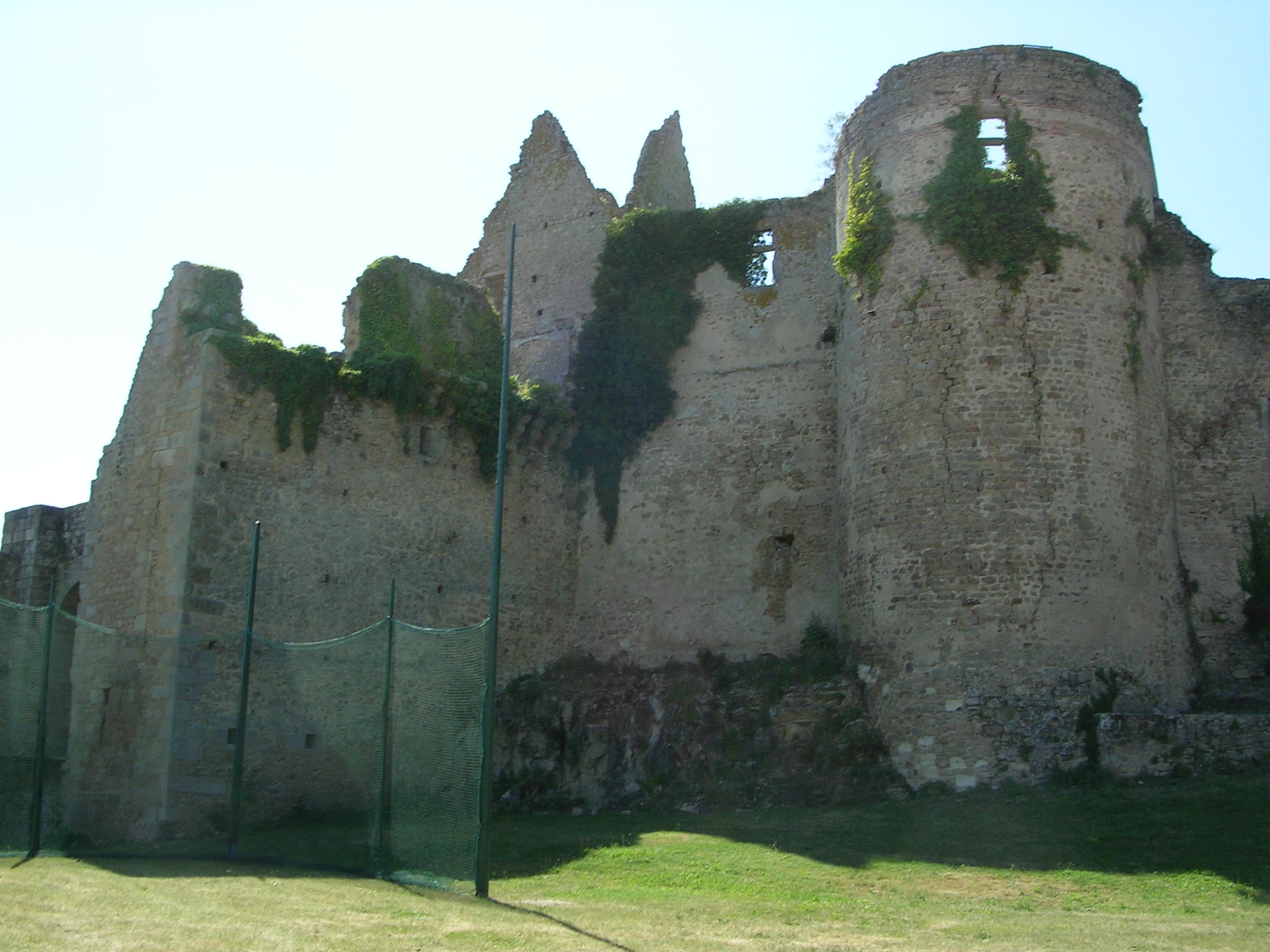
Bressuire Castle in 2006; most of the English survivors of the Battle of Pontvallain died outside its walls.

The few English survivors of the battles still at large scattered in confusion. John Minsterworth's force, which had not been engaged at either battle, immediately removed itself to Brittany. Others made their way to Saint-Sauveur, south of the Loire. Calveley returned to Poitou. Around 300 of the English remnants joined together and overran Courcillon Castle, near Château-du-Loir, and then marched to the Loire, closely pursued by Sancerre. Many of Knolles's men abandoned their positions garrisoning castles, including Rillé and Beaufort la Vallée, and also headed to the Loire. This group, which included many wounded men and pillagers, joined up with the other English force, making it "several hundred" in strength.

Guesclin maintained his close pursuit, and his constant ambushes and raids diminished the English numbers. They eventually reached the relative safe haven of the ford at Saint-Maur. Calveley's force, which had taken no part in either of the battles, had already crossed. A little beyond the ford was a strong English garrison at a fortified abbey. Here, some of the English went east, while the majority continued towards Bordeaux. This group continued to be pursued by Guesclin, now joined again by Sancerre, deep into Poitou, where it was eventually run to ground outside Bressuire Castle. This was also occupied by an English garrison, but, fearing that if they opened the gates they would admit the French army alongside the English, they refused to do so. As a result, what remained of this remnant of the Pontvallain army was wiped out under the walls.

Sancerre proceeded to regain the castles previously captured by Knolles during his chevauchée. Guesclin made his way back to Saint-Maur where he negotiated with the English inside the abbey – led by Sir John Cresswell and Calveley – and arranged their release on payment of a ransom. The price of freedom for the English is unknown. Soon after, Guesclin returned to Le Mans.

There is uncertainty as to exactly where in Brittany Knolles retired to with the booty he had garnered. Whether to Derval, to Concarneau, or to one and then to the other, he was soon joined by Minsterworth. They decided to return to England with most of their force early the following year. They made their way to the port of Pointe Saint-Mathieu, repeatedly ambushed by the French en route. When they arrived there were only two small ships available, inadequate for the several hundred men with Knolles and Minsterworth. Their numbers were swollen by English garrisons which had abandoned their posts and independently made their way to the port. Minsterworth was one of the relative few who could buy a passage; most of those who remained, possibly amounting to around 500 men, were massacred by the French, who soon caught up with them.

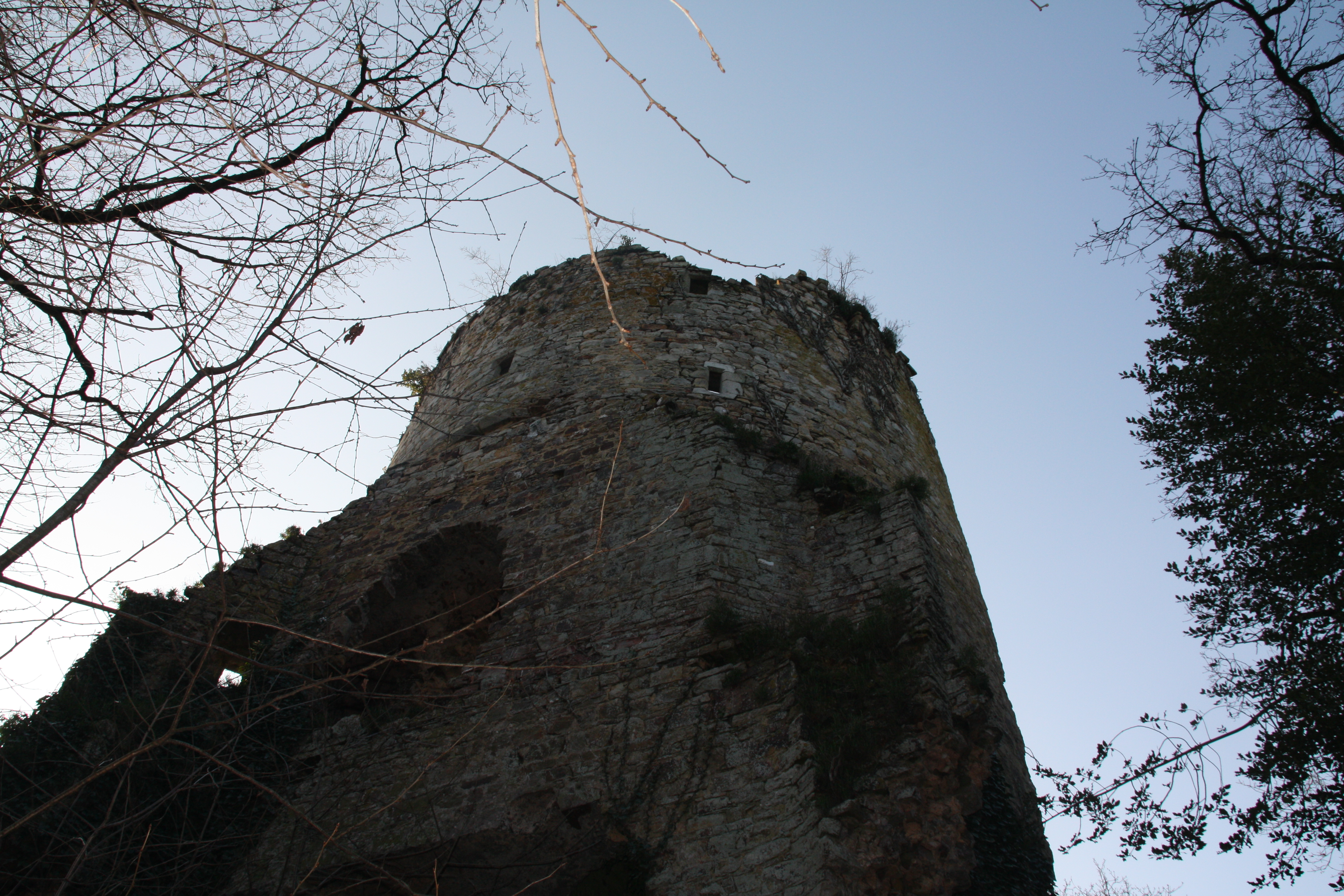
Little remained in 2011 of Knolles's castle at Derval.

The return of Minsterworth to England "began a long period of recrimination", politically. Although he was as culpable as Knolles or any of the other commanders, Minsterworth attempted to avoid almost all the blame for the military disaster that had befallen them by putting the responsibility on to Knolles. In July 1372 the King's council effectively agreed with him, and condemned Knolles for the defeat. The English nobility also blamed Knolles, because of his lower social status. Despite this, Minsterworth was unable to exculpate himself completely, and the council later had him arrested and charged with traducing Knolles.

Sumption argues that the Pontvallain campaign and its aftermath should be seen as a "spectacular demonstration of Guesclin's capacity to be everywhere at once" and an "extraordinary demonstration of [his] unconventional skills as a commander". Many knights were captured by the French, including John Clanvowe, Edmund Daumarle and William Neville, and were conveyed to Paris in open carts and strictly imprisoned. Others spent great sums evading capture, often borrowing money from colleagues to do so. Fitzwalter was held prisoner until he was able to raise a ransom by mortgaging his Cumberland estates to Edward III's mistress Alice Perrers on ruinous terms.

== Legacy ==
Knolles's campaign has been estimated to have cost Edward at least £66,667 (equivalent to £39,000,000 in 2025), based on his known requests for loans. (Note: This surprisingly precise figure is due to the loan being accounted for in marks, which were valued at two-thirds of a pound; the total loan was 100,000 marks – of which the single greatest amount came from the "famously rich" Richard, Earl of Arundel, who lent the King 40,000 marks, or £26,667. (Approximately £16,000,000 in 2025 terms.) To put the cost of Knolles's campaign in perspective, it has been estimated that this whole period of war, from its outbreak in 1369 to the 1375 Treaty of Bruges, may have cost as much as £650,000. (£380,000,000 in 2025 terms.)) The historian May McKisack suggests that the chevauchée that preceded the battle yielded "plunder but little military benefit". Maurice Keen notes that even though Knolles had reached the gates of Paris, "he had little to show for it when he reached Brittany", which illustrated how much the Hundred Years' War had changed in character. According to Christopher Allmand, "the days of Crécy and Poitiers were over". Pontvallain, argues Alexander Gillespie, "destroyed the reputation the English had for invincibility on the battlefield".

England continued losing territory in Aquitaine until 1374, and as they lost land, they lost the allegiance of the local lords. Pontvallain ended King Edward's short-lived strategy of promoting an alliance with Charles, King of Navarre. It also marked the last use of great companies – large forces of mercenaries – by England in France; most of their original leaders had been killed. Mercenaries were still considered useful, but they were increasingly absorbed into the main armies of both sides.

Five hundred years later, when the French lost Alsace-Lorraine to Germany, the Pontvallain campaign was used jingoistically by the French as an example of a spectacular recovery of territory, to keep alive hope of eventually similarly recovering Alsace-Lorraine.

== Notes, references and bibliography ==
=== Bibliography ===
- Allmand, C. (1989). The Hundred Years' War: England and France at War, c. 1300–c. 1450. (Cambridge Medieval Textbooks). Cambridge: Cambridge University Press. ISBN 978-0-521-31923-2.
- Ambühl, R. (2013). Prisoners of War in the Hundred Years War: Ransom Culture in the Late Middle Ages. Cambridge: Cambridge University Press. ISBN 978-1-107-01094-9.
- Barber, R. (2004). "Chandos, Sir John (d. 1370)". Oxford Dictionary of National Biography (online ed.). Oxford University Press. doi:10.1093/ref:odnb/5110. (Subscription, Wikipedia Library access or UK public library membership required.)
- Bell, A. R.; Chapman, A.; Curry, A.; King, A. & Simpkin, D., eds. (2011). The Soldier Experience in the Fourteenth Century. Woodbridge, Suffolk: Boydell Press. ISBN 978-1-84383-674-2.
- Bell, A. R.; Curry, A.; King, A. & Simpkin, D. (2013). The Soldier in Later Medieval England. Oxford: Oxford University Press. ISBN 978-0-19-968082-5.
- Burne, A. H. (1999) [1955]. The Agincourt War. Ware, Hertfordshire: Eyre & Spottiswoode. ISBN 978-1-84022-211-1.
- Carlin, M. & Crouch, D. (2013). Lost Letters of Medieval Life: English Society, 1200–1250. Philadelphia: University of Pennsylvania Press. ISBN 978-0-8122-0756-9.
- Coulton, G. G. (1908). Chaucer and his England. London: Methuen. OCLC 220948086.
- Fowler, K. (2001). Medieval Mercenaries: The Great Companies. Vol. I. Oxford: John Wiley & Sons. ISBN 978-0-631-15886-8.
- Fowler, K. (2004). "Calveley, Sir Hugh (d. 1394)". Oxford Dictionary of National Biography (online ed.). Oxford: Oxford University Press. doi:10.1093/ref:odnb/4407. (Subscription, Wikipedia Library access or UK public library membership required.)
- Galbraith, V. H. (1970). The Anonimalle Chronicle, 1333 to 1381: From a MS. Written at St Mary's Abbey, York (repr. ed.). Manchester: Manchester University Press. ISBN 978-0-7190-0398-1.
- Gillespie, A. (2016). The Causes of War: Volume 2: 1000 CE to 1400 CE. London: Bloomsbury. ISBN 978-1-84946-645-5.
- Gribit, Nicholas (2016). Henry of Lancaster's Expedition to Aquitaine 1345–46. Woodbridge, Suffolk: Boydell Press. ISBN 978-1-78327-117-7.
- Jack, R. I. (2004). "Hastings, John, thirteenth earl of Pembroke (1347–1375)". Oxford Dictionary of National Biography (online ed.). Oxford: Oxford University Press. doi:10.1093/ref:odnb/12580. (Subscription, Wikipedia Library access or UK public library membership required.)
- Jaques, T. (2006). Dictionary of Battles and Sieges: A Guide to 8,500 Battles from Antiquity through the Twenty-first Century: P-Z. Vol. III. Westport, CT: Greenwood. ISBN 978-0-313-33539-6.
- Jones, M. (2017). The Black Prince: The King That Never Was. London: Head of Zeus. ISBN 978-1-78497-293-6.
- Kagay, D. & Villalon, A., eds. (2008). The Hundred Years War: Pt. 2: Different Vistas. (History of Warfare). Leiden: Brill. ISBN 978-9-00416-821-3.
- Keen, M. H. (1973). England in the Later Middle Ages. Bristol: Head of Zeus. ISBN 978-0-416-75990-7.
- McKisack, M. (1991). The Fourteenth Century, 1307–1399 (repr. ed.). Oxford: Oxford University Press. ISBN 978-0-19-285250-2.
- Neillands, R. (1990). The Hundred Years War. Padstow, Cornwall: Routledge. ISBN 978-0-415-00148-9.
- Nicholson, H. A. (2003). Medieval Warfare: Theory and Practice of War in Europe, 300–1500. London: Palgrave. ISBN 978-0-333-76331-5.
- Ormrod, W. M. (2012). Edward III. Yale English Monarchs. New Haven, Connecticut: Yale University Press. ISBN 978-0-300-11910-7.
- Perroy, E. (1965). The Hundred Years War. Translated by Wells, W. B. New York: Capricorn. p. 164. OCLC 773517536.
- Prestwich, M. (1988). Edward I. Berkeley: University of California Press. ISBN 978-0-520-06266-5.
- Prestwich, M. (2003). The Three Edwards: War and State in England, 1272–1377. London: Routledge. ISBN 978-0-415-30309-5.
- Prestwich, M. (2007). Plantagenet England:1225–1360. New Oxford History of England. Oxford: Oxford University Press. ISBN 978-0-19-922687-0.
- Rogers, C. J. (2000). The Wars of Edward III: Sources and Interpretations. Woodbridge, Suffolk: Boydell Press. ISBN 978-0-85115-646-0.
- Rogers, C. J. (2005). "Sir Thomas Dagworth in Brittany, 1346–7: Restellou and La Roche Derrien". In Rogers, C. J. & de Vries, K. (eds.). The Journal of Medieval Military History. Vol. III. Woodbridge, Suffolk: Boydell Press. pp. 127–54. ISBN 978-1-84383-171-6.
- Sherborne, J. W. (1964). "Indentured Retainers and English Expeditions to France, 1369–80". The English Historical Review. 79: 718–746. doi:10.1093/ehr/LXXIX.CCCXIII.718. OCLC 51205098.
- Sumption, J. (2009). The Hundred Years' War: Divided Houses. Vol. III (paperback ed.). London: Faber & Faber. ISBN 978-0-571-24012-8.
- Tout, T. F. (1965). The History of England from the Accession of Henry III to the Reign of Edward III, 1216–1377. Vol. III (repr. ed.). New York: Haskell House. OCLC 499188639.
- Wagner, John A. (2006a). "Brétigny, Treaty of". Encyclopedia of the Hundred Years War. Woodbridge, Suffolk: Greenwood. pp. 250–252. ISBN 978-0-313-32736-0.
- Wagner, John A. (2006b). "Guesclin, Bertrand du, Constable of France". Encyclopedia of the Hundred Years War. Woodbridge, Suffolk: Greenwood. pp. 141–142. ISBN 978-0-313-32736-0.
- Wagner, John A. (2006c). "Hundred Years' War, Causes of". Encyclopedia of the Hundred Years War. Woodbridge, Suffolk: Greenwood. pp. 157–159. ISBN 978-0-313-32736-0.
- Wagner, John A. (2006d). "Hundred Years' War, Phases of". Encyclopedia of the Hundred Years War. Woodbridge, Suffolk: Greenwood. pp. 160–164. ISBN 978-0-313-32736-0.
- Wagner, John A. (2006e). "Philip VI, King of France (1293–1350)". Encyclopedia of the Hundred Years War. Woodbridge, Suffolk: Greenwood. pp. 250–252. ISBN 978-0-313-32736-0.
