= Roger Beauchamp, 1st Baron Beauchamp of Bletso =

English aristocrat

Roger Beauchamp
- Baron Beauchamp of Bletsoe
- Arms of Beauchamp of Bletsoe: Gules, a fess between six martlets or
- Born: c. 1315
- Died: 3 January 1380
- Spouses: Sibyl de Patteshull; Margaret de Carew
- Issue: Sir Roger Beauchamp; Philip de Beauchamp; Margaret de Beauchamp
- Father: Roger de Beauchamp

Roger Beauchamp, 1st Baron Beauchamp of Bletsoe (c. 1315 – 3 January 1380) was an English soldier and peer who served both King Edward III and his wife, Philippa of Hainault.

== Family ==
Roger de Beauchamp, perhaps born about 1315, was the son and heir of Roger de Beauchamp, a younger son of Walter de Beauchamp (Steward to Edward I) and Alice de Tosny, daughter of Roger de Tosny of Flamstead, Hertfordshire.

== Career ==
Beauchamp was a yeoman to Edward III by 24 April 1337, and is described as a bachelor to Philippa of Hainault on 26 October 1340, when she granted him the keepership of Devizes Castle. He served in the wars in France from as early as 1346, and in 1372 was appointed Captain of Calais. He was summoned to Parliament from 1 June 1363 to 20 October 1379 by writs directed Rogero de Bello Campo, whereby he 'may be held to have become Lord Beauchamp'. He was appointed Lord Chamberlain of the Household to Edward III in 1376–77.

He died 3 January 1380. In his will, dated 19 December 1379 and proved 26 February 1380, he requested burial at the Blackfriars, London, beside his first wife.

== Marriages and issue ==
Beauchamp married firstly, before 15 March 1337, Sibyl de Patteshull (d. before 1375), heiress of Bletsoe, one of the four daughters and co-heiresses of Sir John de Pateshull (c.1291–1349) of Bletsoe, by his wife Mabel de Grandison, a daughter of William de Grandison, 1st Baron Grandison, by whom he had two sons and a daughter:

- Sir Roger Beauchamp (d. before 15 May 1374), who married Joan de Clopton, widow of Sir Walter de Walcote, and daughter of William de Clopton. Sir Roger had a son—perhaps by an unknown first wife—Roger Beauchamp, 2nd Baron Beauchamp of Bletsoe (1362–1406), the grandfather of Margaret Beauchamp of Bletso, grandmother of Henry VII. He also had a daughter, Margaret Beauchamp, who married Robert Mauteby, esquire.
- Philip de Beauchamp (born c. 1338), Archdeacon of Exeter. He was a godson of Philippa of Hainault.
- Margaret de Beauchamp, who married, firstly, Sir John de Blanchminster of Wighill, Yorkshire, and, secondly, Sir Gilbert Talbot of Wadley, Berkshire.

He married secondly Margaret de Carew (died c. 2 October 1394), sister of William de Carew, and widow of Thomas de Grandison, 4th Baron Grandison (d. 1375), by whom he had no issue.
