= Robert Knolles =

English knight (c. 1325–1407)

- English Knight
- Blason of Robert Knolles
- Born: 1325; Cheshire, England
- Died: 1407 (aged 81–82); Sculthorpe, England

Sir Robert Knolles or Knollys (c. 1325 – 15 August 1407; aged 81–82) was an English knight of the Hundred Years' War, who, operating with the tacit support of the crown, succeeded in taking the only two major French cities, other than Calais and Poitiers, to fall to Edward III. His methods, however, earned him infamy as a freebooter and a ravager: the ruined gables of burned buildings came to be known as "Knollys' mitres".

== Early life ==
The parentage and early life for Knolles is sparse. It is often erroneously stated that his mother was Eve Calveley, a close relative of Sir Hugh Calveley. His father was possibly Richard, a yeoman from Cheshire. Before taking up the career of a soldier. The French Chronicler Jean le Bel noted that he 'had worked in the cloth trade.’

== Breton war of succession ==
Knolles was more than likely one of the fifteen men that travelled with Sir Hugh Calveley to participate in the ongoing conflict in Brittany, with Knolles almost certainly serving as a longbowman in his company. Knolles first appears as the captain of several castles throughout Brittany in the mid-14th century, including Fougeray, Gravelle and Chateaublanc. He was one of the English champions at the Combat of the Thirty in 1351, where he was captured. He then contributed himself and 800 men to the 1356 chevauchée of Henry of Grosmont, Duke of Lancaster through Normandy, a diversionary campaign to draw King John II of France north and thus leave the Black Prince free to embark on the famous Poitiers campaign. With France in disarray after the Battle of Poitiers, King Charles II of Navarre assumed command of the rebellion in Paris, and Knolles joined up with the army of Charles's brother Philip as they temporarily held the capital against the Dauphin in 1358.

Knolles' finest hours were to come that autumn when he led a Great Company of 2,000–3,000 Anglo-Gascons into the Loire Valley, establishing several forward garrisons at important towns like Châteauneuf-Val-de-Bargis. He then advanced into the Nivernais, which was unsuccessfully defended for Margaret III of Flanders by the Archpriest Arnaud de Cervole, the adventurer who had raised the first Great Company the previous year.

In 1359 Knolles reached Auxerre, which fell after a two-month siege on 10 March. After the city had surrendered, Knolles was knighted by two subordinates, previously he had formally only been ranked as a squire. The sack of Auxerre proceeded with little violence and destruction, Knolles and his soldiers were professionals who intended to maximize their profit. The city was carefully ransacked for valuables and the citizens assessed for ransom. At the end a huge ransom was extorted for not destroying the city, although this was only partly paid. The following month he returned to Chateauneuf to plot the invasion of the Rhône Valley with Hugh Calveley. Marching south, a forward base was established on the Allier at Pont-du-Chateau, from where they launched the invasion of the Velay. Knolles then reunited with Calveley to besiege the important city of Le Puy, which fell in July 1359. As they continued to the Papal city of Avignon, their path was barred by the army of Thomas de la Marche, deputy for Louis II, Duke of Bourbon, at which point both English commanders retreated and dissolved their companies.

At the climax of the Breton War of Succession he participated in John de Montfort's siege of Auray in July 1364, the prelude to John's decisive victory at the Battle of Auray in September. He joined the Black Prince at the Battle of Nájera (Navarrete) of 1367.

== French campaign ==
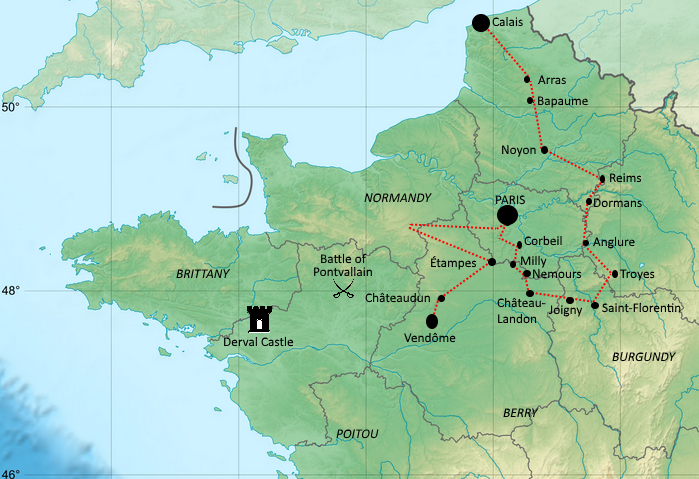
Robert Knolles' compaign in France

In 1370 he was given a large grant of lands and money to raise an army to invade northern France. He landed at Calais in August with 6,000 mounted men and carried out a raid deep into French territory, burning villages on the outskirts of Paris but failing to bring the French king Charles V out to battle. He then turned towards Gascony and began capturing and fortifying castles and churches in the region between the rivers Loir and Loire. However he had to cope with much criticism from his younger subordinate commanders such as Sir John Minsterworth who were spoiling for a fight. When it became known that French armies under the command of Bertrand du Guesclin were closing in on them, Knolles proposed to retreat into Brittany but most of the army refused. He therefore marched away with his own retinue, leaving the bulk of the army where they were, to be comprehensively defeated and slaughtered at the Battle of Pontvallain on 4 December.

Knolles passed the winter in his castle at Derval on the Breton March and afterwards attempted to evacuate his men and those of Minsterworth, who had managed to join him with his surviving troop, from the port of Saint-Mathieu. However, for lack of ships most of the English soldiers had to be left behind on the shore, to be wiped out by the French under Olivier V de Clisson. In 1372 Knolles was found by the King's Council to bear the major responsibility for this disaster. He was stripped of the lands that had been given him as his fee for raising the army and fined 10,000 marks.

== Death and legacy ==
Like many of his contemporaries who made vast fortunes off of the war in France, in the latter years of his life, he sought to make amends for his sins. The pardon that he secured from Edward III in May of 1361 provides a surprising insight into the brutality that defined the career of a soldier of fortune in the early part of the Hundred Years' War:

"Pardon to Robert Knolles, in consideration of his services in the king’s wars, of the kings suit of all homicides, larcenies, robberies, felonies, extortions, oppressions, champerties, maintenances of false quarrels, holding of castles, towns, fortalices and other places against the will and mandates of the king or his ministers, taking of ransoms or fines from all manner of men in any parts beyond the seas, in the king’s dominion or without, assumptions of the royal power in adjudging or death in the said parts men opposing him in places where he was captain, dissolutions and violations of truces between the king or his ministers and his adversaries, goings and progresses without England against the king’s prohibition, and other trespasses whatsoever, whereof he is indicted or appealed, and of any consequent outlawries."

He named Thomas Knollys as one of the executors of his estate in 1389. He died at his seat in Sculthorpe, Norfolk on 15 August 1407.

He also founded Trinity Hospital, Pontefract and helped to suppress the Peasants' Revolt.

Knolles' coat of arms decorates the postern tower of Bodiam Castle, Sussex. It was a statement of loyalty to Knolles by its builder, Edward Dalyngrigge who served under Knolles in a Free Company during the Hundred Years' War.
