= Château de Courcillon =

Castle in Pays de la Loire, France

Coordinates: 47.662°N 0.488°E

Château de Courcillon is a castle in Dissay-sous-Courcillon, Pays de la Loire, France.

== History ==
A castle was built in the eleventh century. The castle was reconstructed and improved in the fourteenth century. An English force of 300 men captured the castle in 1350, after their defeat at the Battle of Pontvallain, while retreating.
