= Jean IV de Mauquenchy =

14th century French nobleman

- Arms of Jean IV de Mauquenchy: Azure, seméé of crosses crosslet or, a cross argent.
- Died: 1391

Jean IV de Mauquenchy (died 1391), Lord of Blainville, also known as Mouton de Blainville, was a French soldier and nobleman. He was a Marshal of France during the Hundred Years' War.

== Biography ==
In 1370, with Bertrand du Guesclin, they defeated an English army beneath the walls of the Château de la Faigne and captured the commander Thomas de Grandison.
