= Pontvallain =

- Commune
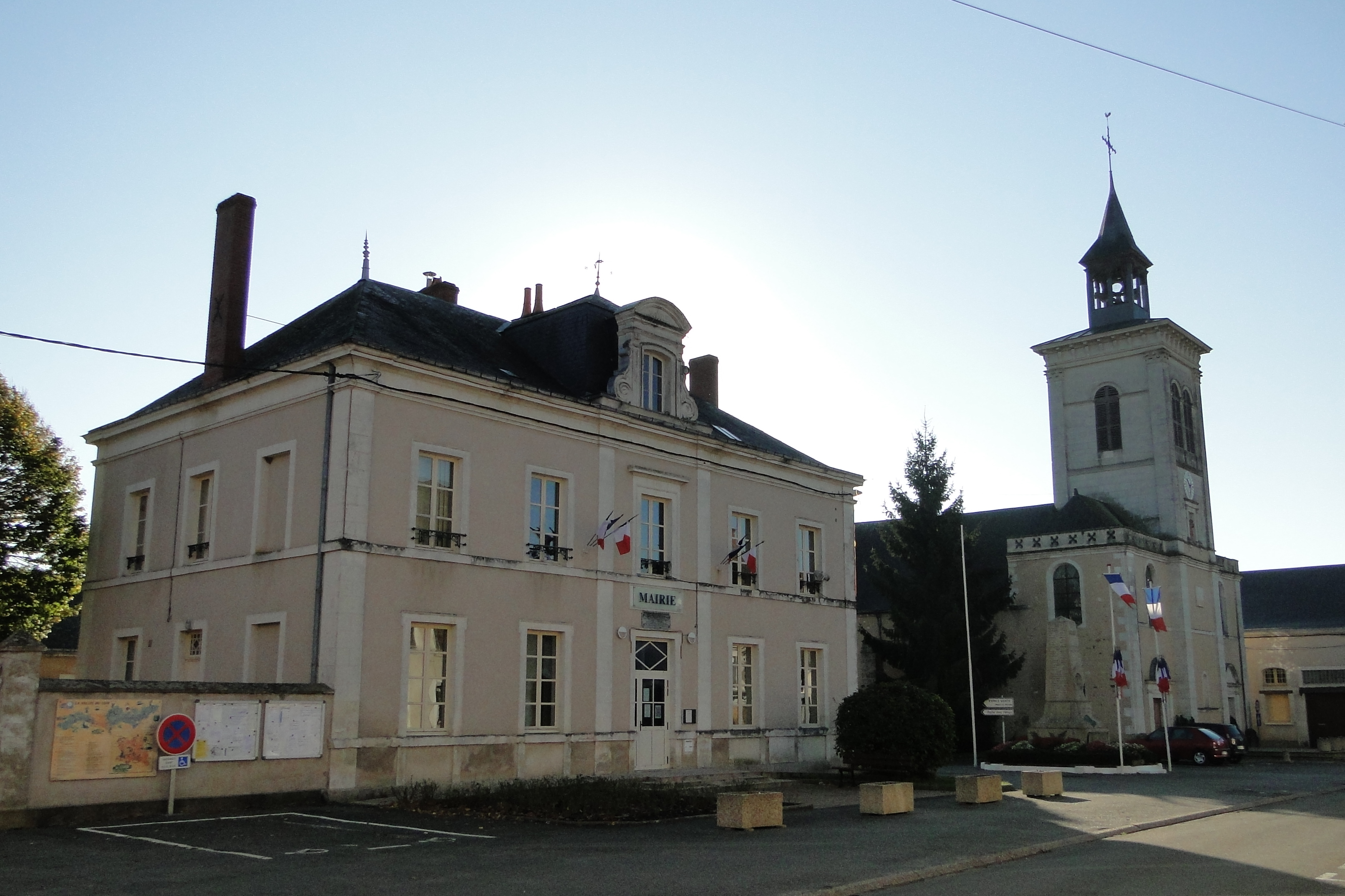
- The town hall and church of Saint-Pierre and Saint-Paul

- Coat of arms
- Location of Pontvallain
- Location within France Location within Pays de la Loire
- Coordinates: 47°45′03″N 0°11′32″E
- Country: France
- Region: Pays de la Loire
- Department: Sarthe
- Arrondissement: La Flèche
- Canton: Le Lude
- Intercommunality: Sud Sarthe

Government
  - Mayor (2020–2026): Xavier Gayat
- Area^{1}: 34.88 km^{2} (13.47 sq mi)
- Highest elevation: 111 m (364 ft)
- Lowest elevation: 42 m (138 ft)
- Population (2023): 1,607
  - Density: 46.07/km^{2} (119.3/sq mi)
- Demonym(s): Vallipontain, Vallipontaine
- Time zone: UTC+01:00 (CET)
  - Summer (DST): UTC+02:00 (CEST)
- INSEE/Postal code: 72243 /72510
- ^{1} French Land Register data, which excludes lakes, ponds, glaciers > 1 km^{2} (0.386 sq mi or 247 acres) and river estuaries.

Pontvallain (French pronunciation: [pɔ̃valɛ̃]) is a commune in the Sarthe department in the region of Pays de la Loire in north-western France.

It was the site, on 4 December 1370, of the Battle of Pontvallain, a significant military engagement between England and France (who had the victory) during the Hundred Years' War.

== See also ==
- Communes of the Sarthe department
