= Roger Beauchamp (1362–1406) =

English politician (1362–1406)

Sir Roger Beauchamp (14 September 1362 – 13 May 1406) was an English politician. He sat as MP for Bedfordshire in 1399.

He was knighted by 18 February 1393.

== Political career ==
He also served as sheriff of Bedfordshire and Buckinghamshire from 8 November 1401 till 29 November 1402; commissioner to prevent the spread of treasonous rumours in Dorset in May 1402; controller of a tax in Bedfordshire in March 1404; and collector in April 1404.

== Family ==
He was born in Bletsoe, the son of Sir Roger Beauchamp, probably by his wife Joan, the daughter and heiress of Willam Clopton and widow of Sir Walter Walcot. He was the grandson and heir of Roger, Lord Beauchamp (died 3 January 1380). He married Mary and had at least one son.
