= John de Pateshull =

Arms of Pateshull: Argent, a fesse sable between three crescents gules

John de Pateshull (c.1291–1349) of Bletsoe in Bedfordshire, was a Member of Parliament.

== Origins ==
He was the son and heir of Simon de Pateshull (d.1295) "the younger", by his wife Isabella de Steyngreve, daughter and heiress of Sir John de Steyngreve. John was about four years old at his father's death, and was in the king's wardship.

== Career ==
He was summoned to a council of magnates in 1335 and received a summons to the Parliament of 1342, but no later parliamentary summons and his name occurs among the knights summoned to military service in 1345.

== Marriage and children ==
He married Mabel de Grandison, daughter and eventually coheiress of William Grandison of Bletsoe, brother of Otto I de Grandison, 1st Baron Grandison (c.1238–1328), by whom he had issue including:

- William de Pateshull (c.1322–1360), who did not receive a summons to Parliament, and died childless in 1360, leaving his four sisters as co-heiresses;
- Sybil de Pateshull, wife of Roger Beauchamp, 1st Baron Beauchamp of Bletsoe (c.1315–1380), who inherited Bletsoe;
- Alice de Pateshull, wife of Thomas Wake;
- Mabel de Pateshull, wife of Walter de Fauconberg, who inherited Pattishall;
- Katherine de Pateshull, wife of Sir Robert de Tudenham.
