= John de Cresswell =

14th century English nobleman

John de Cresswell was an English soldier and nobleman.

== Biography ==
John was a younger son of Alexander de Cresswell. He was engaged in the Hundred Years' War and was Captain of Bordeaux Castle.

After the crushing English defeat at Pontvallain, Cresswell was in charge of an English garrison at Saint-Maur. A French army, led by Bertrand du Guesclin approached and after on assault was defeated negotiations arranged the English release on payment for the town.

During an expedition in Scotland he was taken prisoner, along with Lord Greystoke in 1380. Richard II of England organised his release. He is known to have had two sons, John and George.
