= William de Grandison, 1st Baron Grandison =

English nobleman (died 1335)

Coat of arms of William de Grandison, Paly of six Argent and Azure, on bend Gules, three eagles displayed Or.

William de Grandison (died 1335), was an English noble, and Deputy Justiciar of North Wales.

William was a younger son of Pierre de Grandison and Agnes Neufchâtel. He was the younger brother of a key ally and envoy, for King Edward I of England, Otto de Grandson, Grandison being an anglicisation of Grandson.

He served in the household of Edmund, Earl of Lancaster. He was active in the wars in Gascony and Scotland. During 1292, he was granted a license to crenellate his manor of Ashperton, Herefordshire.

== Marriage and issue ==
William first married Jeanette de Gruyère, daughter of Pierre de Gruyère and Ambrosie, surname unknown. They had the following issue:

- Two sons de Grandison, names unknown, died young.
- Gerard de Grandison.
- John de Grandison.
- Agnes de Grandison, married Thomas Bardolf, a son of Hugh Bardolf, 1st Baron Bardolf.

William secondly married Sybil, daughter of John de Tregoz and Mabel FitzWarin. They had the following issue:

- Edmund de Grandison.
- Piers de Grandison, married Blanche Mortimer.
- John de Grandison, Bishop of Exeter.
- Thomas de Grandison, cleric.
- William de Grandison, Archdeacon of Exeter.
- Otho de Grandison, married Beatrice Malmayns, had issue.
- Mabel de Grandison, married John de Pateshull, had issue.
- Katherine de Grandison, married William Montagu, 1st Earl of Salisbury, had issue.
- Agnes de Grandison, married John Northwode, had issue.
- Maud de Grandison, nun at Aconbury Priory.

== Citations ==
Peerage of England
New creation	Baron Grandison; 1299–1335	Succeeded by Peter de Grandison
