= Louis de Sancerre =

14th-century French military officer

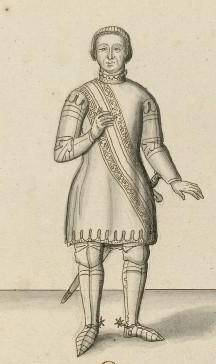
Louis of Sancerre

Louis de Sancerre (1341 or 1342 – 6 February 1402; aged 60-61) was a Marshal of France and Constable of France during the Hundred Years' War.

== Early life ==
Sancerre was born as the second son of count Louis II de Sancerre and Béatrix de Roucy. His father was killed at the battle of Crécy in 1346. After the death of his father King Philip VI of France ordered him to be educated together with the children of the Duke of Normandy. Sancerre had his first experience in war during the Siege of Melun in 1359, where he gained the notice of Bertrand du Guesclin.

== Service under Charles V ==
When Charles V of France became King, Sancerre served in the conquest of Guyenne. The King made him a Marshal of France on 20 June 1368 with the order to protect Paris. In 1369 Sancerre surprised and forced the Earl of Pembroke to retreat to Puyrenon. He aided du Guesclin in winning the Battle of Pontvallain. During the next years, Sancerre fought the English in the Limousin, Languedoc and Guyenne. In 1375 Sancerre captured Cognac and Saint-Sauveur-le-Vicomte. He fought against the Tard-Venus and against the local lords in the Auvergne who had taken to brigandage. In 1377 Sancerre was campaigning again in Guyenne and he took part in the siege of Bergerac, where he distinguished himself in capturing several local lords. After the death of du Guesclin both Coucy and Sancerre were offered the post of Constable but refused. Barbara Tuchman postulated that they both refused the office because they knew the King was ailing and a regency under the Dukes of Anjou, Berry and Burgundy was coming and they didn't want the political enmity the function brought with it.

== Service under Charles VI ==
When Charles V died in 1380, his heir, Charles VI of France was still a minor. Sancerre took part in the siege of Montguyon in 1380. He also took part in the coronation of Charles VI in Reims.

When Louis II of Flanders was driven out of his county by the revolt of Ghent, Sancerre was part of the royal army that was raised to put down the rebellion. At the Lys River near the town of Comines, the French army was held up by 900 Flemish soldiers commanded by Peter van den Bossche. Since the only bridge was broken, a party of 400 French knights led by Sancerre was ferried across the river. These volunteers spent an anxious night, then joined battle in the morning. Soon the bridge was rebuilt, the bulk of the French army crossed and the superior force quickly put the Flemish spearmen to flight. On 27 November 1382, Sancerre was in co-command of the vanguard at the battle of Roosebeke in which the rebels were defeated.

In 1383 Sancerre and Coucy forced the gates of Paris in order to put down the civic troubles in the city. Later that year Sancerre returned to Guyenne to face the English again. In 1384 Sancerre took Marseille and other places in the Provence. In 1385 he went to England as an envoy. In 1386 Sancerre was made captain-general of the King in Limousin, la Marche, Saintonge, Angoulême and Guyenne. The same year he besieged the castle of Bouteville (Charente). In 1387, Louis de Sancerre drove the English out of the castle of La Rochandry and besieged Châteauneuf-sur-Charente, Vibrac and Merpins. In 1389 Sancerre replaced the Duke of Berry as governor of Languedoc.

After the death of the Count of Eu, Sancerre was made Constable of France on 26 July 1397. In 1398 Sancerre lead an army against the captal de Buch and the count of Foix and, after a campaign during which he took several towns and castles, successfully negotiated with them to leave the English camp and to submit to the French King. In 1401 an ailing Sancerre resigned as Governor of the Languedoc. After making his testament, Sancerre died on 6 February 1402 and was interred in the Basilica of St Denis.
