= Pierre d'Orgemont =

French politician (c.1315–1389)

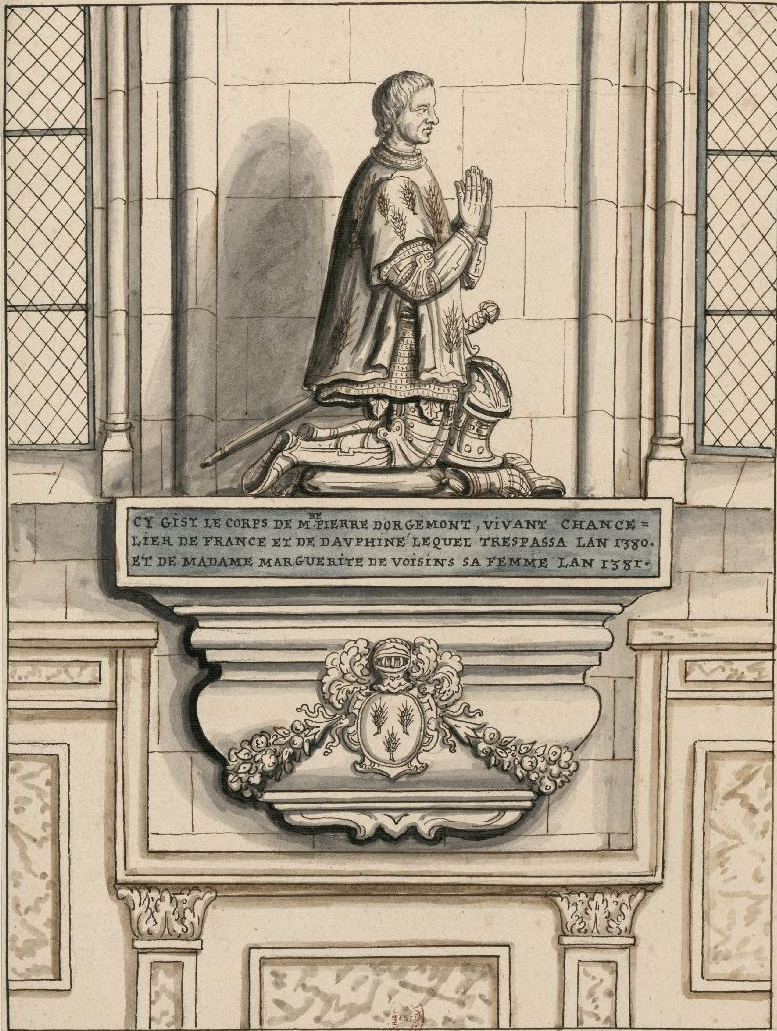

Arms of Pierre d'Orgemont : d’azur à trois épis d’orge d’or mis en pal 2 et 1

Pierre (I) d’Orgemont (c. 1315 – 23 June 1389) was a French politician of the Hundred Years' War era.

== Life ==
Born c. 1315, he seems to have been the son of Jean d’Orgemont, a middle-class man from Lagny who owned buildings on rue Saint-Antoine in Paris, or the son of the Pierre d’Orgemont who appears in the wills of Louis X and Philippe le Long.

Pierre d’Orgemont studied law and began his career as a mere lawyer in 1340 in the Parlement de Paris where he was made master clerk in May 1347 then first president in 1355. He proved loyal to the French crown during John II of France's captivity in France after capture at the battle of Poitiers, notably during the revolt of the Estates General in 1357 led by Étienne Marcel. This gained d'Orgemont recognition from the dauphin, the future Charles V of France. On 20 November 1373 he became the only ever chancellor of France to be elected by a college of electors. This college had been summoned together by Charles V:

In the year one thousand three hundred and seventy three, on Sunday 20th November, our king held his grant and general council at the Louvre, from prelates, from princes of his line, barons and other nobles, from the lords of the Parlement, from the 'requestres de son Hostel', from the 'Comptes', and other councillors up to the number of twenty-six-and-ten persons or thereabouts, to elect the chancellor of France

Such a procedure was never revived by Charles' successors.

At Christmas 1373, Pierre d'Orgemont was made a knight. He remained chancellor until his retirement in 1380, following the death of Charles, who made him executor of his will—he then became maître des requêtes to the parlement de Paris. He also contributed to editing the Grandes Chroniques de France from 1350 to 1380. In 1384, he was made chancellor of the Dauphiné by Charles VI of France. On 26 May 1386, he bought the lordship of Chantilly from the last Bouteillier de Senlis. He soon began to build an impressive moated château, completed after his death by his son Amaury.

== Bibliography ==
- (in French) Léon Mirot, Les d’Orgemont, leur origine, leur fortune, le boiteux d’Orgemont, Champion, Paris, 1913
- (in French) Georges Bordonove, Les Rois qui ont fait la France – Les Valois – Charles V le Sage, vol 1, éditions Pygmalion, 1988.
