= Roger Beauchamp (died 1373) =

Son of the first Baron Beauchamp of Bletsoe

Sir Roger Beauchamp
- Died: c. 1373/4
- Spouse(s): Joan de Clopton
- Issue: Roger
- Father: Roger Beauchamp, 1st Baron Beauchamp of Bletso

Sir Roger Beauchamp of Bletsoe was the son and heir presumptive of his father Sir Roger, 1st Baron Beauchamp of Bletsoe who was one of Edward III’s leading courtiers and had been summoned to Parliament as Lord Beauchamp of Bletsoe.

The younger Sir Roger died vita patris (c. 1373), perhaps while fighting in France as a retainer of John of Gaunt. His father took personal charge of his young son, also Roger (b. 1362), who later became de jure 2nd Baron Beauchamp of Bletso.

Through his descendant and great-granddaughter, Margaret Beauchamp, he was an ancestor of Henry VII.
