= Thomas de Grandison, 4th Baron Grandison =

14th century English nobleman

Arms of Grandison: Paly of six argent and azure, on a bend gules three eagles displayed or

Thomas de Grandison, 4th Baron Grandison (died 1 November 1375), KG, was an English soldier and nobleman.

== Biography ==
Thomas was the son of Otes (also seen as Otho) de Grandison (youngest son of William de Grandison, 1st Baron Grandison) and Beatrix Malemayne. He inherited his uncle's John de Grandison titles in 1369.

Grandison led an English force in northwest France in 1370 and was defeated beneath the walls of the Château de la Faigne, by a French army and was captured. He was created a Knight of the Garter in 1370.

Thomas had married Margaret of Caru, with whom he had no issue. He died on 1 November 1375.
