= Battle of Bois des Caures =

Battle in World War I

- Part of Battle of Verdun
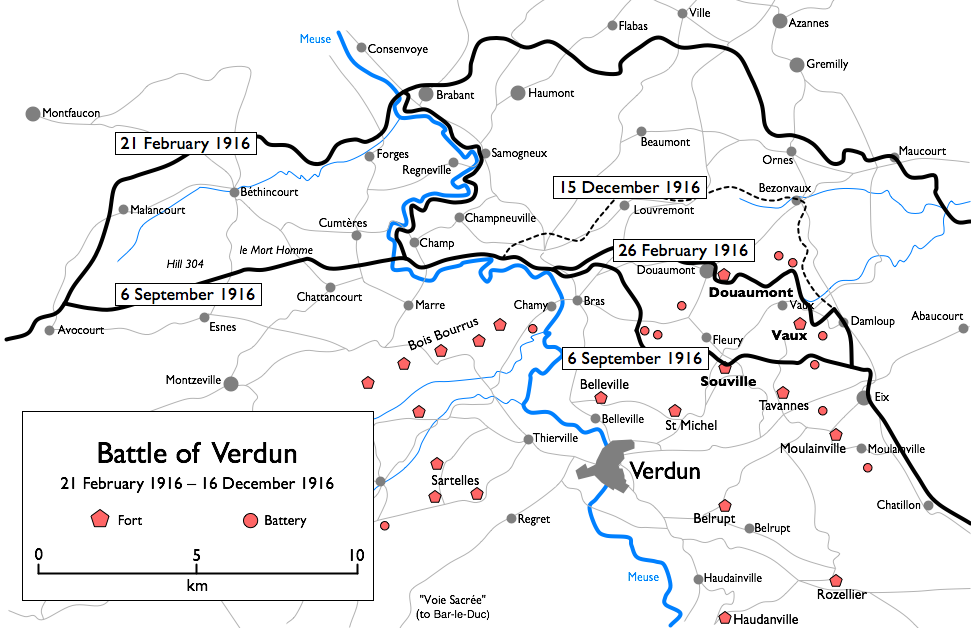
- Battle of Verdun, Flabas is located in the north
Date	21 February 1916 – 22 February 1916
Location	Verdun, France
Result	German defeat

Belligerents
Germany	France

The Battle of Bois des Caures was fought at the beginning of the Battle of Verdun in World War I. The battle was fought in the commune of Moirey-Flabas-Crépion (former commune of Flabas), in the department of Meuse, north of Verdun in France.

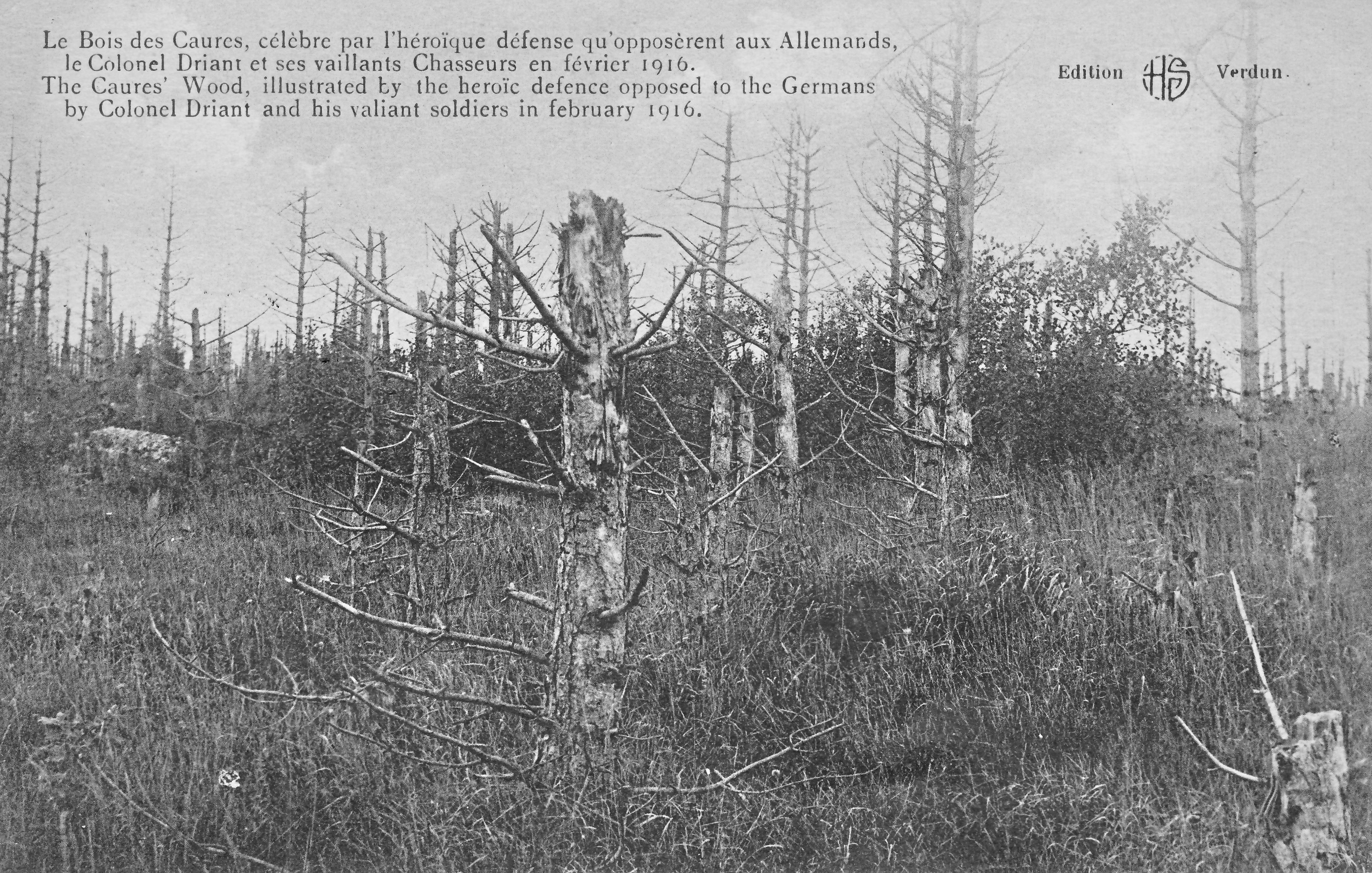
Postcard published after the First World War.

In February 1916, the woods were crossed by the front line. This poorly defended section of the front was defended by Lieutenant-Colonel Émile Driant's light infantry battalions. On 21 February 1916, on the first day of the Battle of Verdun, the woods were destroyed by one of the most impressive artillery barrages. The survivors of the two battalions held out for almost two days against the overwhelmingly superior German troops before being destroyed or captured. This resistance slowed the German advance and allowed reinforcements to reach the front.

== Historical context ==
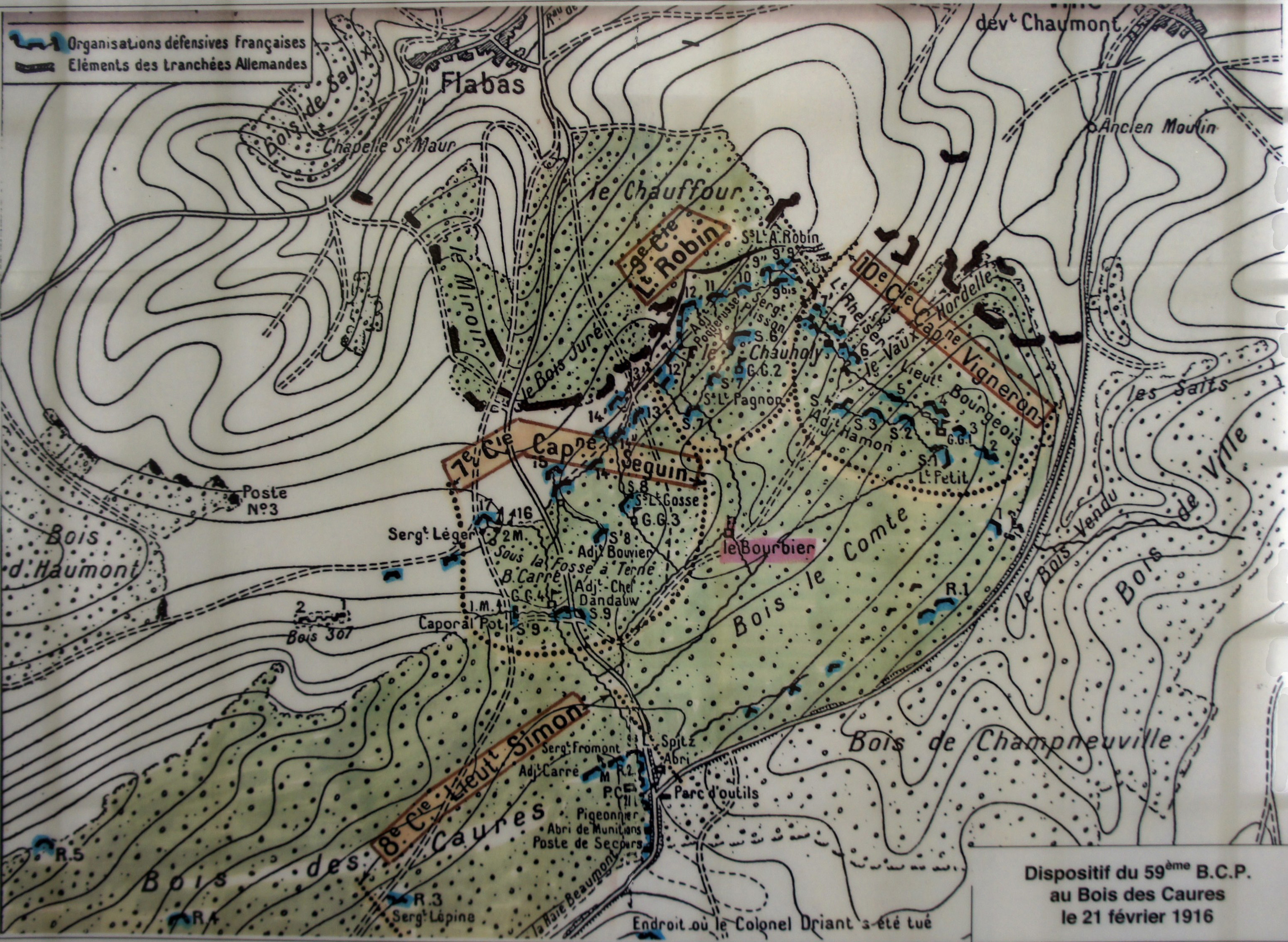
First line at Bois des Caures.

The Bois des Caures was the northernmost position on the Verdun front, on the right bank of the Meuse, between the towns of Flabas, Haumont, and Beaumont; the rest area was at Samogneux. Since the stabilization of the front at the end of 1914, this area had been considered secondary. Despite warnings from Lieutenant Colonel Driant, no reinforcement efforts were ordered by General Headquarters (GQG). From the month of January 1916, faced with the progress of German preparations for an offensive, Driant reinforced the defences in the Bois des Caures on his own initiative. The 56th and 59th battalions of Chasseurs à Pied alternatively occupied the front lines.

On 21 February 1916, facing them was the German 21st Division, made up of three regiments or nine battalions. This division was supported by 40 heavy artillery batteries, seven field batteries and 50 Minenwerfer (trench mortars) for a total of 230 pieces.

== The battle ==
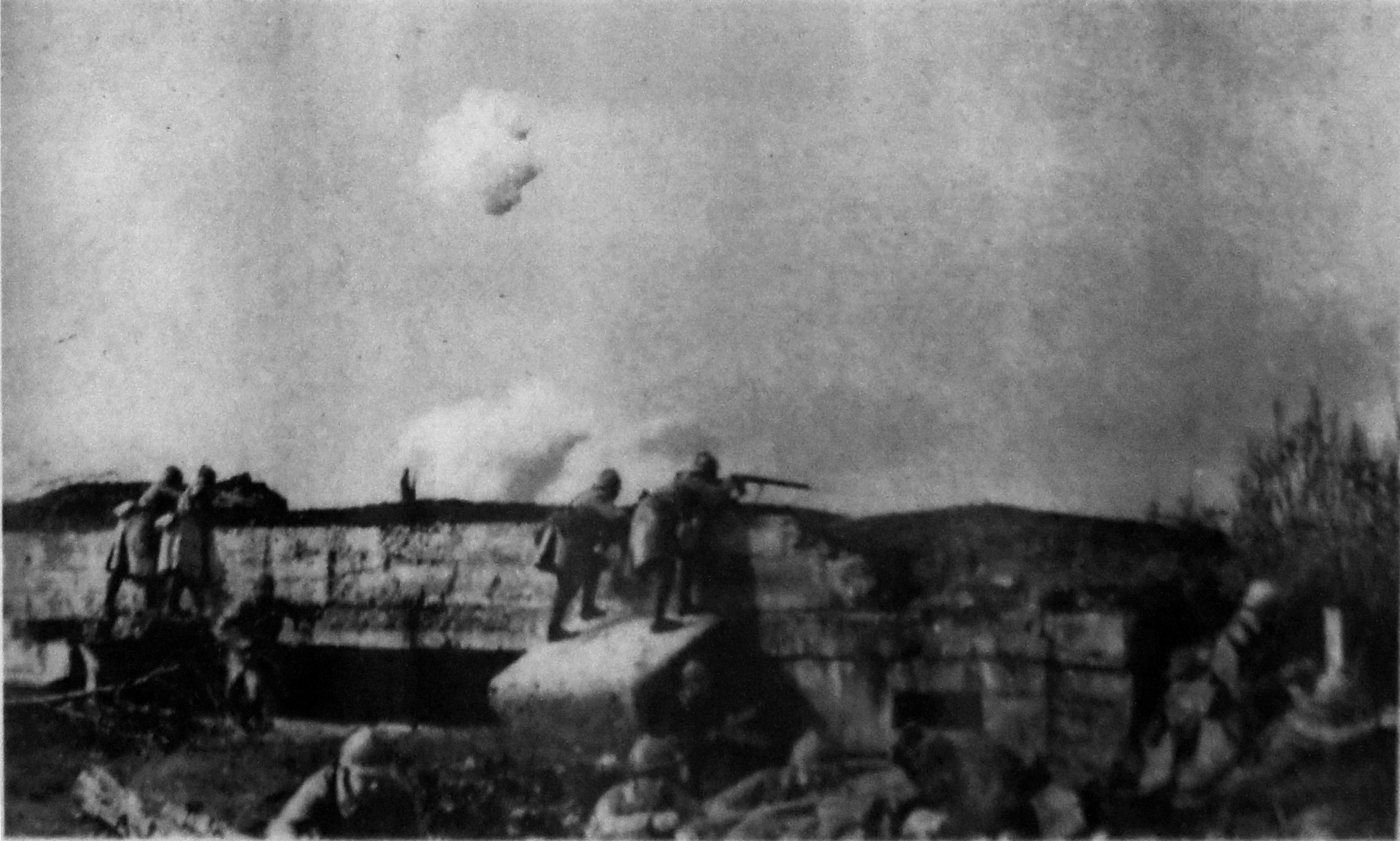
Chasseurs in combat, Bois des Caures.

On 21 February, the Bois des Caures was defended in the first line by the 59th Chasseurs à Pied Battalion and the 56th Chasseurs à Pied Battalion in the second line, totaling approximately 1,200 men, under the command of Lieutenant-Colonel Émile Driant. From 7:30 a.m., the woods and the entire front line were subjected to a particularly intense bombardment, which lasted until 4:00 p.m. It is estimated that approximately 80,000 shells were dropped on the woods — a sector measuring 1,300 meters by 800 meters — during that day.

It is not known for certain how many defenders survived this major attack, but when the bombardment ceased at 4:00 PM, a handful of infantrymen emerged from their shelters and prepared to fight. Their eyes were red and the explosions had deafened them, many were wounded. Most of their machine guns were out of commission, some had nothing left but grenades and their bayonets. While the artillery continued to pound the area behind the woods, German assault columns, flamethrowers in the lead, began their advance through the splintered stumps of the Bois des Caures. These were elements of the 42nd Brigade of the XXI Division, led by five pioneer detachments and flamethrower teams. Daylight was fading, and it began to snow. Only around a quarter of the Chasseurs survived the bombardment, but they clung to their positions and even counterattacked during the night to retake a lost post. Sergeant Léger and five Chasseurs fired until they ran out of ammunition; Léger even managed to exhaust his stock of 40 hand grenades before being wounded and losing consciousness. Not far away, Sergeant Legrand and six Chasseurs had only two rifles left in working order, but they fought to the death. There would be only one survivor, Corporal Hutin, who was wounded and captured. On 22 February, the Germans bombarded the position again, then launched a major attack, capturing post after post and shelter after shelter. Driant burned his documents, evacuated his command post, and was killed shortly afterwards.

== Balance sheet ==
During these battles, both battalions lost 90% of their rifle strength, but their resistance decisively delayed the German advance. It also allowed French reinforcements to arrive in time to prevent a breakthrough towards Verdun. These battles marked the beginning of the Battle of Verdun, which would last until October 1916.

== The Caures woods, a place of remembrance ==
A marked outdoor walking trail allows visitors to explore the Bois des Caures site. Information panels are placed along the 800m route. Visitors can discover the command post, the tomb of Lieutenant-Colonel Driant, and the memorial to the 56th and 59th battalions of Chasseurs à Pied (light infantry).

=== The monument ===
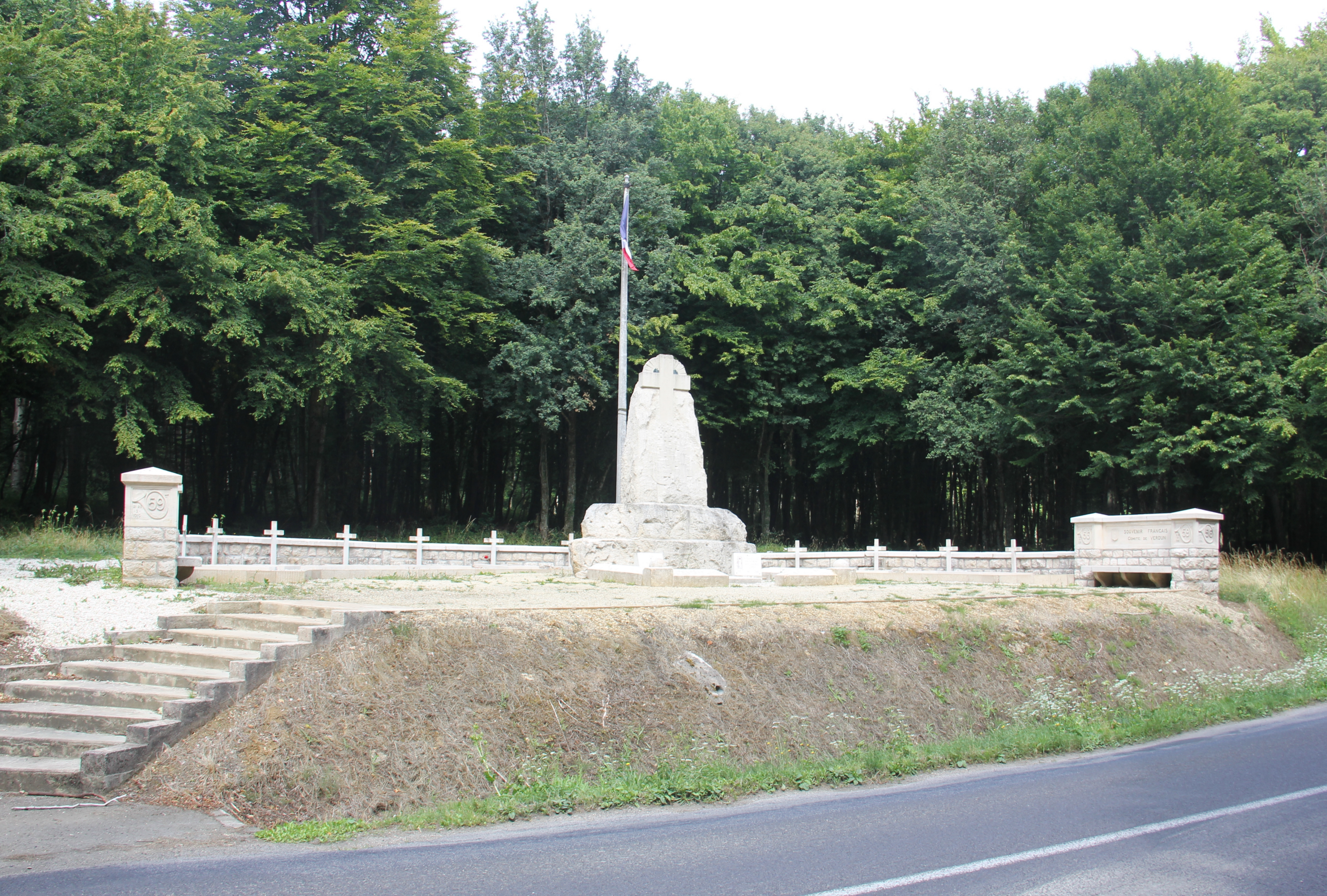
Driant Memorial (pictured in 2015)

==== History ====
In 1922, Le Souvenir français decided to pay homage, on the battlefield, to the soldiers of the 56th and 59th battalions of light infantry and to their leader, Lieutenant-Colonel Driant.

==== Description ====
A monument was erected at the fork of the road to Flabas and the road to Ville-devant-Chaumont, 20km north of Verdun. This monument was sculpted by Grégoire Calvet. An imposing monolith carved from Meuse limestone rises above a block of rock. At the top emerges a haloed Latin cross. Below, one can see a series of funerary crosses. The first cross is surrounded by a hunting horn, the symbol of the infantry. The following dedication is engraved on the base:

Au Colonel Driant et à ses chasseurs.

Around the monument are the graves of thirteen unidentified soldiers. From the monument, one can reach the destroyed village of Beaumont-en-Verdunois located approximately 2.5km away.

== Commemorations ==
A memorial ceremony is held every 21 February in front of the memorial to the hunters. The 12th class (1965–1966) of active non-commissioned officers of the 'ENSOA de Saint-Maixent and of the EAENSOA of the EMI de Montpellier bears the name of VERDUN-BOIS DES CAURES. The 2016 class of the Higher School of Reserve Staff Officers was named the Lieutenant-Colonel DRIANT class.

== Bibliography ==
- 59e Bataillon de Chasseurs à pied, Historique 1914 - 1918, Paris, Librairie Chapelot
- Historique du 56e bataillon de Chasseurs à pied, Metz, Imprimerie Lorraine
- Lefebvre, Jacques-Henri (2005). Verdun : la plus grande bataille de l'histoire racontée par les survivants. mémorial de Verdun (in French). France: Les Éditions de Riaux. p. 555. ISBN 978-2-84901-021-1. OCLC 314766721.
- Pierre Miquel, Le Serment de Verdun, tome 3 de la suite romanesque Les enfants de la patrie, Paris, Fayard, 2002
- Mari, Pierre (2013). Les grands jours (in French). Paris: Fayard. p. 154. ISBN 978-2-213-67065-2. OCLC 829991225.,

== See also ==
- List of military engagements of World War I
- Offensive à outrance
- Battle of Verdun
- Lieu de mémoire
- World War I memorials
