= Émile Driant =

French writer and soldier (1855–1916)

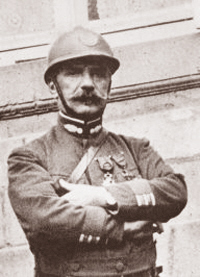
- Born: Émile Augustin Cyprien Driant; 11 September 1855; Neufchâtel-sur-Aisne, France
- Died: 22 February 1916 (aged 60); Bois des Caures, Flabas, Meuse, France
- Burial place: Moirey-Flabas-Crépion, France
- Military career
- Allegiance: France
- Branch: French Army
- Service years: 1877–1906; 1914–1916
- Rank: Lieutenant colonel
- Nickname: "Father Driant"
- Conflicts: World War I
- Awards: Knight of the Légion d'honneur Officer of the Légion d'honneur Croix de guerre 1914–1918; Officier d'Académie; Commander of the Order of Glory; Commander of the Order of Saint Stanislaus; Knight of the Order of the Dragon of Annam; Knight of the Order of the Crown of Italy; Knight of the Order of the Liberator; Knight of the Royal Order of Cambodia; Officer of the Royal Order of Cambodia; Officer of the Order of St Alexander

Émile Augustin Cyprien Driant (French pronunciation: [emil dʁiɑ̃]; 11 September 1855 – 22 February 1916) was a French writer, politician, and army officer. He was a deputy for Meurthe-et-Moselle from 1910 until he was killed in 1916 at Flabas by German invading forces, making him the first high-ranking casualty of the Battle of Verdun during World War I.

== Biography ==
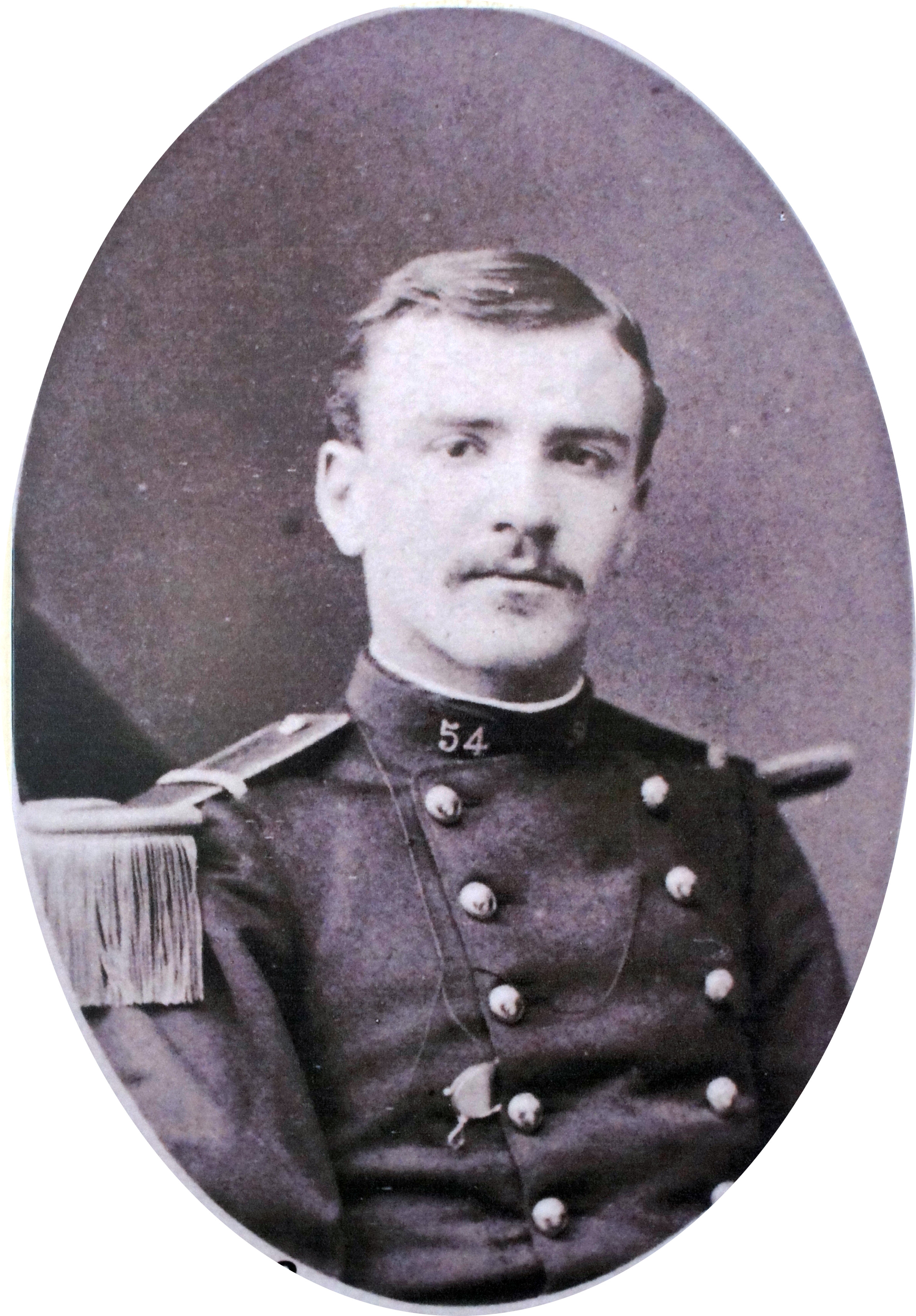
Second lieutenant Driant graduated from Saint-Cyr

Born at Neufchâtel-sur-Aisne in the Picardy region, Driant graduated from the Saint-Cyr military academy and became an Army officer in 1877. Appointed to infantry, he joined the 4th Regiment of Zouaves in North Africa as a Captain in 1886. In 1888 Driant married the daughter of nationalist General Boulanger. He spent the years 1892–1896 as an instructor at the Saint-Cyr military academy, and from 1899–1905 commanded the 1st Battalion of Chasseurs.

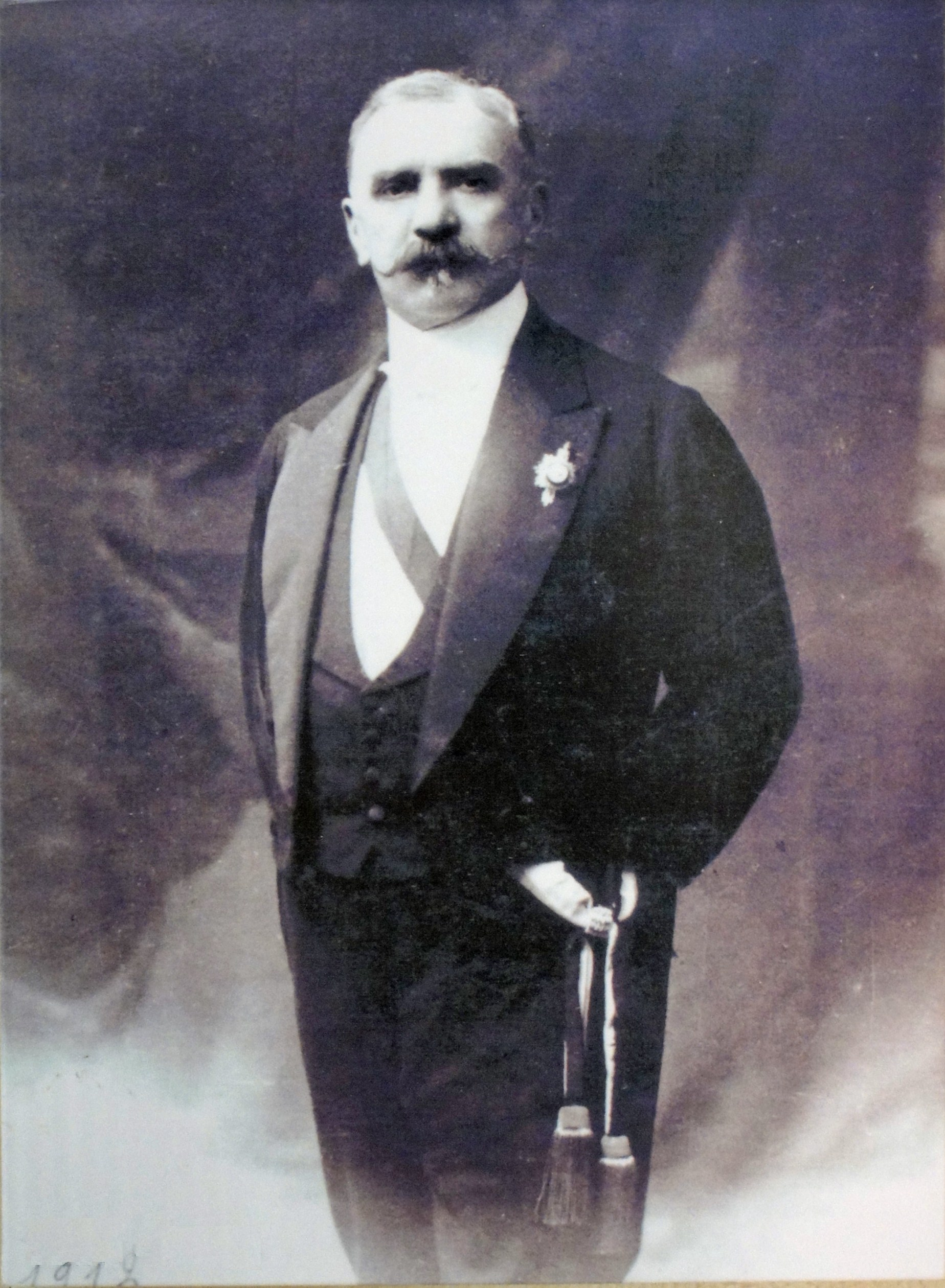
Driant as a deputy in 1912.

He resigned his commission in 1906, as he was banned from achieving higher rank due to his controversial father-in-law and by his strong nationalist and Catholic sentiments. He devoted his time to journalism and politics and was elected to the Chamber of Deputies as a representative for Nancy in 1910 as a member of the Popular Liberal Action party. Driant devoted his efforts to strengthening France's defenses.

== Writing ==
In 1888 Driant began writing his first guerre imaginaire ("imaginary war") novel, which he was to publish using the pseudonym "Capitaine Danrit". This was La Guerre de demain ("The War of Tomorrow"), comprising three stories which told the tale of: La Guerre en forteresse ("Fortress Warfare"), La Guerre en rase campagne ("War in Open Country"), and La Guerre en ballon ("Balloon Warfare"). The action begins with La Guerre en fortresse, as reports arrive of a surprise German attack upon France.

Driant gave his readers heroic episodes, great victories over the Germans, and in the 1192 pages of his Guerre fatale: France-Angleterre ("The Fatal War: France-England", 1902), the total defeat of the British by the French.

Driant possibly wrote more future-war novels than any other writer before 1914. He published so much fiction, and his stories were so long, that half a century later Pierre Versins said in his Encyclopédie de l'utopie et de la science fiction (1972) that the hundred pages of Chesney's Battle of Dorking were much more important and revealing "than the thousands of white pages soiled day after day by a national hero of France" (Driant had a postage stamp dedicated to him in 1956, Scott #788, Yvert et Tellier #1052).

== World War I ==
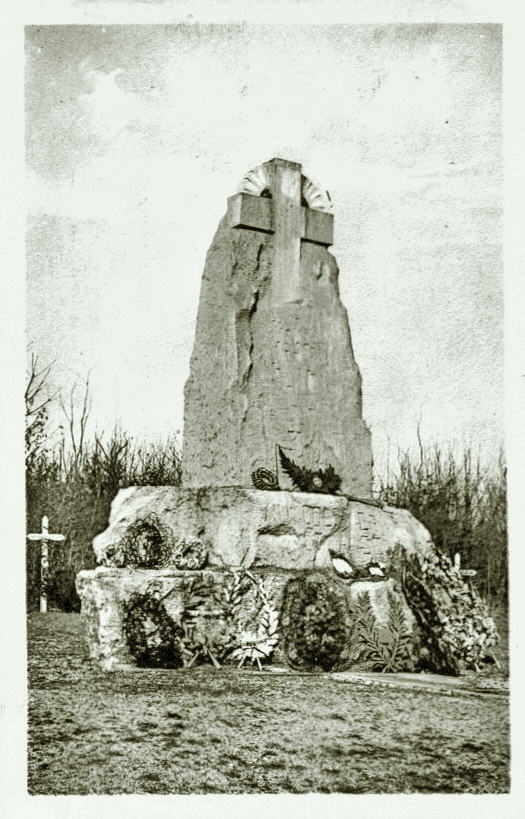
Memorial to Émile Driant and his battalion in the Bois des Caures, Flabas, France.

Soon after the beginning of World War I in 1914, Driant was recalled to the Army as a captain. He was promoted to lieutenant colonel and given command of two infantry battalions, the 56th and 59th chasseurs reservists battalions. He still kept his seat in Parliament and was, among other things, involved in the drafting of the legislation to create the Croix de Guerre.

In December 1915, he criticised Joseph Joffre for removing artillery guns and infantry from fortresses around Toul and Verdun in order to strengthen other areas of the now-deadlocked Western Front. Despite the support of the Minister for War Joseph Gallieni, no troops or guns were returned. What were supposed to be formidable defences were reduced to a small number of guns and soldiers to man them. Driant claimed that the area was threatened; Joffre denied this.

Driant was proved right on 21 February 1916, when the German Army initiated a massive attack on French forces in the Verdun sector. As the French defences crumbled all around them, Driant's two battalions – 1,200 men in total – began a desperate defence of the Bois des Caures in Flabas. Under his command, the battalions managed to resist the German onslaught until the afternoon of the next day, helping to gain the time that the French High Command needed to rush troops to the threatened sector. When his battalions were outflanked and the position was untenable, Driant ordered the survivors to withdraw. During the withdrawal, he was killed. He was regarded as a hero among the French at the time, and he and his men are still commemorated at a ceremony on 21 February every year.

He was buried initially by the Germans, who also wrote to his widow (via Switzerland) to assure her that he had been accorded full military honours. He was re-interred by the French where he fell in the Bois des Caures, where a memorial now stands to him and his men.

== Bibliography ==
A selection of books by the author:

- Capitaine Danrit (1895). L'Invasion noire. E. Flammarion.
- Capitaine Danrit; P. de Pardiellan (1896). La Guerre de Demain. Le Journal de Guerre Du Lieutenant Von Piefke. Illustrations by Paul de Sémant.
- Capitaine Danrit (1889). La Guerre de Demain. Grand Récit Patriotique & Militaire. Illustrations by Paul Cousturier.
- Capitaine Danrit (1891). La guerre en rase campagne. Flammarion.
- Capitaine Danrit (1894). La guerre au vingtième siècle: l'invasion noire.
- Capitaine Danrit (1902). Les exploits d'un sous-marin.
- Émile Augustin Cyprien Driant (1904). La guerre fatale, France-Angleterre. E. Flammarion.
- Capitaine Danrit (1905). L'Invasion Jaune. Illustrated by G. Dutriac.
- Capitaine Danrit (1905). Ordre du Tzar: de Samarcande à L'hassa. Flammarion.
- Émile Driant (1906). Vers un nouveau Sedan. Juven.
- Paul Combes; Émile Driant (1906). La Guerre possible. J. Tallandier.
- Émile Augustin Cyprien Driant (1908). Guerre maritime et sous-marine. E. Flammarion.
- Émile Augustin Cyprien Driant (1909). L'aviateur du Pacifique. E. Flammarion.
- Émile Augustin Cyprien Driant (1909). Un dirigeable au Pole Nord. Flammarion.
- Capitaine Danrit (1910). La Guerre Fatale. Les Exploits D'un Sous-marin. The Sunken Submarine ... Translation by Frederick Lawton. With Forty-eight Illustrations. London.
- Émile Augustin Cyprien Driant (1910). L'Alerte. Illustrated by G. Dutriac. E. Flammarion.
- Capitaine Danrit (1912). Robinsons souterrains. Flammarion.
- Émile Augustin Cyprien Driant (1912). Jean Tapin: histoire d'une famille de soldats, 1re période, 1792–1830. Librairie Delagrave.
- Émile Augustin Cyprien Driant (1913). Le grand pèlerinage a la Mecque. E. Flammarion.
- Émile Augustin Cyprien Driant (1913). Fin de l'islam devant Paris. E. Flammarion.
- Émile Augustin Cyprien Driant (1913). La mobilisation Africaine. E. Flammarion.
- Émile Augustin Cyprien Driant (1917). Filleuls de Napoléon: histoire d'une famille de soldats, 2e période, 1830–1870. Librairie Delagrave.
- Émile Augustin Cyprien Driant (1920). Petit Marsouin: histoire d'une famille de soldats, 3e période, 1870–1886. Librairie Delagrave.
