= Siege of Rennes =

Siege of Rennes may refer to:

- Siege of Rennes (1356–57), during the War of the Breton Succession
- Siege of Rennes (1491), during the French–Breton War
