= Treaty of Libourne =

The Treaty of Libourne was signed at Libourne on 23 September 1366 between King Peter I of Castile, Edward the Black Prince, heir to the English crown, and King Charles II of Navarre. It led to the English involvement against France in the Castilian Civil War as part of the Hundred Years War.

== Background ==
In 1366, Henry of Trastamara, half-brother of King Peter I and claimant to his throne, invaded the kingdom of Castile at the head of a Franco-Aragonese army, deposed his half-brother and was proclaimed "king of Castile". Henry relied on the French free companies, dispatched by King Charles V of France and led by Bertrand Du Guesclin, and on the troops of the Kingdom of Aragon, which has been at war against Castile for ten years. Peter I therefore turned for help to the enemies of France: Edward the Prince of Wales known as the Black Prince, heir to the English crown at war with the kingdom of France, and Charles the Bad, King of Navarre, who supported the English claims to the crown of France.

The treaty stipulated that the Black Prince and the King of Navarre will provide military and financial assistance to Peter I to retake his throne and will receive Castilian territories in exchange for their help. The Black Prince was supposed to receive the Lordship of Biscay, the city of Castro-Urdiales as well as 550,000 gold florins. For his part, Charles the Bad was to receive the Basque provinces of Gipuzkoa and Álava as well as a county located in the region of Burgos.

To guarantee his side of the treaty, Peter I left his three daughters to reside as hostages at Saint-Émilion and gave the Black Prince a big ruby (actually a spinel) which still adorns the imperial crown of the British monarch.

Despite the victory of the Anglo-Castilian camp at Nájera, Peter I proved unable to hold up his side bargain. The military bill alone amounted to 2.7 million gold florins. Relations between the allies soured after the Black Prince insisted on ransoming the captives, leaving Henry's supporters to fight another day. Edward distanced himself from Peter of Castile and returned to his lands in Aquitaine empty-handed.

== Sources ==
- G.L. Harriss, Shaping the Nation: England 1360-1461, 2005.
