= List of Hundred Years' War battles =

This is a list of major battles in the Hundred Years' War, a conflict between France and England that lasted 116 years from 1337 to 1453. There were 62 of them.

Year	Battle	Victor	Details
1337	Battle of Cadzand	England
1338	Battle of Arnemuiden	France	The first naval battle using artillery, as the English ship Christofer had three cannons and one hand gun.
1340	Battle of Sluys	England	24 June Edward III destroys the Franco-Genoese fleet of Philip VI of France off the coast of Flanders ensuring England will not be invaded and that the majority of the war will be fought in France.
1340	Battle of Saint-Omer	France	The battle of Saint-Omer was the culmination of the northern fork of Edward's campaign and resulted in a tactical stalemate but forced a strategic withdrawal for the Anglo-Flemish forces.
1340	Siege of Tournai (1340)	France	Tournai was relieved.
1341	Battle of Champtoceaux	France
1342	Battle of Brest	England
1342	Battle of Morlaix	England
1345, August	Battle of Bergerac	England	English attack by Earl of Derby against a French army moving towards Bergerac from Montcoq in Gascony. After a running battle, the English stormed the city and sacked it, taking many prisoners and goods. The French reported heavy losses.
1345, October	Battle of Auberoche	England	English surprise attack by Earl of Derby against a French army at Auberoche in Gascony.
1346	Battle of St Pol de Léon	England
1346	Battle of Caen	England	Caen was sacked.
1346	Battle of Blanchetaque	England	English army successfully forded the river.
1346	Battle of Crécy	England	26 August English longbowmen soundly defeat French cavalry near the river Somme in Picardy. An estimated 4,000 French are killed.
1346	Battle of Neville's Cross	England
1346–1347	Siege of Calais	England	On 1 August 1347, the city surrendered. Edward allowed the surviving citizenry to live, so, after providing them with some provisions, he allowed them to leave the city.
1347	Battle of La Roche-Derrien	England	Smaller English force defeated a French force 4-5 times larger, featuring the leadership of Sir Thomas Dagworth.
1350	Battle of Winchelsea	England	English fleet defeats Castilian fleet in a close fight.
1351	Siege of Saint-Jean-d'Angély	France	The French army starts a siege on Saint-Jean-d'Angély and with the personal appearance of King John II of France at the siege, the English garrison surrendered
1351	Battle of Ardres	France
1351	Combat of the Thirty	France	Thirty French Knights from Chateau Josselin under Beaumanoir call out and defeat thirty English Knights under Pembroke and Robert Bramborough.
1352	Battle of Mauron	England	10 August, small victory of Brittany-English forces against Brittany-French ones.
1353	Capture of Lusignan	France
1353	Battle of Comborn	England
1354	Battle of Montmuran	France	Easter 1354, victory of Brittany-French forces against English ones.
1356	Battle of Poitiers	England	Edward the Black Prince captures King John II of France, France plunged into chaos.
1364	Battle of Cocherel	France	16 May, near Houlbec-Cocherel, victory of Brittany-Burgundy-Gascony forces against Navarrese-English ones.
1364	Battle of Auray	England	29 September, end of Breton War of Succession Du Guesclin captured.
1367	Battle of Nájera (Navarette)	England	Black Prince defeats a Castilian / French army at Nájera in Castile.
1369	Battle of Montiel	France	14 March, in Castille, Castilian / French army defeats a Castilian / Portuguese force.
1370	Siege of Limoges	England
1370	Battle of Pontvallain	France	4 December, the Brittany-French army defeats English forces.
1372	Battle of La Rochelle	Castille	Castilian fleet defeats the English fleet, leading to loss of dominance at sea and French piracy and coastal raids.
1373	Battle of Chiset	France
1382	Battle of Roosebeke	France	27 November, a French-Burgundy-Brittany-Norman army defeats a Flemish force twice more numerous.
1383	Siege of Ypres	France	8 June - 8 August, occurs during Despenser's Crusade. The English are routed.
1385	English invasion of Scotland	England	July, Jean de Vienne, having successfully strengthened the French naval situation, lands an army in Scotland, but is forced to retreat.
1385	Battle of Aljubarrota	Portugal	14 August, heavy defeat of Franco-Castilian forces by Portugal, strengthened by English longbowmen. Marks the end of 1383–1385 Portuguese interregnum.
1387	Battle of Margate	England	English fleet defeats Franco-Castilian-Flemish fleet, ending the threat of a French invasion of England.
1404	Battle of Blackpool Sands	England
1415	Siege of Harfleur	England
1415	Battle of Agincourt	England	25 October, English longbowmen under Henry V defeat French under Charles I d'Albret. 6000 French died. 400 English died.
1418–1419	Siege of Rouen	England	31 July - 19 January 1419, Henry V of England re-gains a foothold in Normandy.
1419	Battle of La Rochelle	Castille	Castilian fleet defeats the English fleet.
1420	Battle of Fresnay	England	3 March, the Battle resulted in the defeat of a large Franco-Scottish army.
1421	Battle of Baugé	France	22 March, the French and Scottish forces of Charles VII commanded by the Earl of Buchan defeat an outmanoeuvred English force commanded by the Henry V's brother, the Duke of Clarence, who is killed, forcing Henry to return to France where he will die.
1422	Siege of Meaux	England	Henry V falls ill during the siege. He is taken to Chateau de Vincennes, where he dies aged 35yrs
1423	Battle of Cravant	England	31 July, the French and Scottish army is defeated at Cravant on the banks of the river Yonne.
1423	Battle of La Buissière	France	September, French and Milanese forces defeat a Burgundian army.
1423	Battle of La Brossinière	France	26 September, Brittany-French forces annihilates an English army.
1424	Battle of Verneuil	England	17 August, the French, Scottish, and Milanese forces are decisively defeated in what becomes a ‘second Agincourt’ for the French.
1426	Battle of St. James	England	6 March, a French besieging army under Arthur de Richemont was dispersed by a small force under Sir Thomas Rempstone in Brittany.
1428	Siege of Orléans	France	12 October - 8 May 1429 English forces commanded by the Earl of Salisbury, the Earl of Suffolk, and Talbot (Earl of Shrewsbury) lay siege to Orleans, and are forced to withdraw after a relief army accompanied by Joan of Arc arrives at the city.
1429	Battle of the Herrings	England	English force under Sir John Fastolf defeats French and Scottish armies.
1429	Battle of Jargeau	France	12 June. French forces recaptured the neighboring district along the Loire river. The English suffered heavy losses.
1429	Battle of Meung-sur-Loire	France
1429	Battle of Beaugency	France	English surrendered the town.
1429	Battle of Patay	France	18 June, a French army under La Hire, Richemont, Joan of Arc, and other commanders break through English archers under Lord Talbot and then pursue and mop up the other sections of the English army, killing or capturing about half (2,200) of their troops. The Earl of Shrewsbury (Talbot) and Hungerford are captured.
1430	Siege of Compiègne	France	Otherwise a minor siege, both politically and militarily, and ultimately ended in a defeat for the Burgundians, the capture of Joan of Arc was an important event of this phase of the war.
1435	Battle of Gerberoy	France	La Hire defeats an English force under Arundel.
1449	Battle of Rouen	France	29 October, Rouen is regained from the English by a Brittany-French force.
1450	Battle of Formigny	France	A French force under the duke of Bourbon and Richemont defeats an English force under Thomas Kyriell. 3,774 English deaths and 1,500 captured. Thomas Kyriel, the English general, was captured in action.
1453	Battle of Castillon	France	A French army, under Jean Bureau, defeats an English army under John Talbot to end the Hundred Years' War. This was also the first battle in European history where the use of cannon was a major factor in determining the victor. John Talbot was killed in action. 4,000 English killed in this battle.
