= Tiphaine Raguenel =

Breton noblewoman and astrologer (1335–1373)

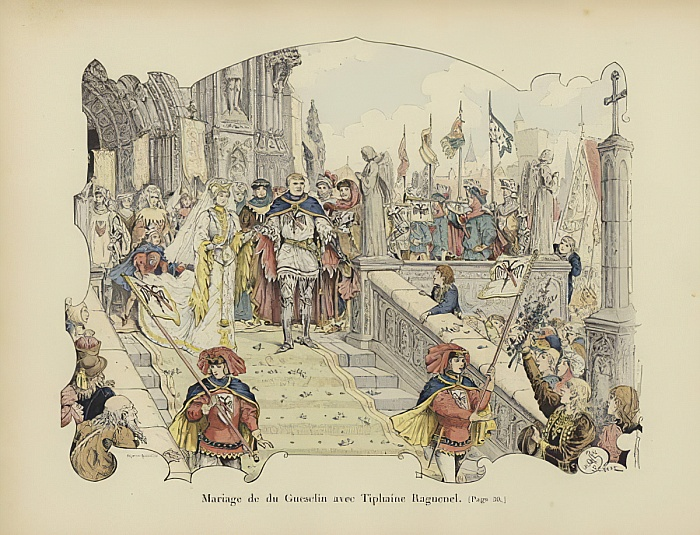
- Marriage of du Guesclin and Tiphaine Raguenel by Paul de Sémant
- Born: 1335
- Died: 1373 (aged 37–38)
- Spouse: Bertrand du Guesclin (m. 1363)
- Parents: Robin Raguenel (father); Jeanne de Dinan (mother)

Tiphaine Raguenel (c. 1335 – 1373) was a Breton noblewoman and astrologer. She was the first wife of Bertrand du Guesclin.

== Life ==
She was the oldest daughter of Robin Raguenel, seigneur de Chatel-Ogier and a veteran of the Combat of the Thirty. Her mother was Jeanne de Dinan, vicomtesse de La Bellière.

In 1363, she married Bertrand du Guesclin in a grand ceremony at the cathedral in Vitré. The marriage was later depicted in a sketch by Paul de Sémant.

Raguenel had a reputation as a learned woman, and as an accomplished astrologer. In 1359, before marrying her husband, she had predicted his victory against Thomas of Canterbury. She is said to have also predicted other results of his battles. While initially treating Raguenel's predictions with contempt, he gave them credit following the French loss in the Battle of Auray, which occurred on a date Raguenel claimed was unfavorable. She and her husband lived in Mont-Saint-Michel. Her former home has been restored and converted into a monument, Logis Tiphaine.

In 2012, a skull attributed to her was found in a reliquary box in an old house in Dinan, and given to the library in Dinan by an anonymous donor.

== Sources ==
- Vernier, Richard (2007). The Flower of Chivalry: Bertrand Du Guesclin and the Hundred Years War. D.S. Brewer.
