= Battle of Montmuran =

Part of the Breton succession war

- Part of the Breton War of Succession
| Date | 10 April 1354 |
| Location | Montmuran (Les Iffs) |
| Result | Blois Party Victory |

Belligerents
| House of Montfort, Brittany; Kingdom of England | House of Blois, Brittany; Kingdom of France |

Commanders and leaders
| Hugh Calveley | Bertrand du Guesclin |

Following the defeat of Mauron during the Breton War of Succession, the Franco-Bretons, led by Bertrand Du Guesclin, took their revenge at the Battle of Montmuran on April 10, 1354.

== The battle ==
Along with many other Englishmen, the young Hugh Calveley served in Brittany, supporting Jean de Montfort's English-backed bid to become Duke of Brittany against the French-backed claimant, Charles de Blois, during the Breton War of Succession.

In 1354, Calveley was captain of the English-held fortress of Bécherel. He planned a raid on the castle of Montmuran on 10 April, to capture Arnoul d'Audrehem, Marshal of France, who was a guest of the lady of Tinteniac. Bertrand du Guesclin, in one of the early highlights of his career, anticipated the attack, posting archers as sentries. When the sentries raised the alarm at Calveley's approach, du Guesclin and d'Audrehem hurried to intercept. In the ensuing fight, Calveley was unhorsed by a knight named Enguerrand d'Hesdin, captured, and later ransomed.

== Historicity ==
The only source for the ambush is oral tradition of the local seignours, the Laval-Tinteniac family. This was first document in the 16th century by the historian Bertrand d'Argentré. The earliest biography of Bertrand du Guesclin, published shortly after his death, does not record the battle and instead notes he was knighted in 1357 by Charles de Blois in the aftermath of the Siege of Rennes. Charles de Blois was Bertrand du Guesclin's natural overlord so it would be normal practice for him to have knighted him. However the battle would have brought together du Guesclin, d'Audrehem and Calveley who later enjoyed a rather friendly association. Du Guesclin also went on to marry Jeanne de Laval-Tinteniac who was grand-daughter of the chatelaine of Montmuran at the time of the battle. Richard Vernier, writing in 2007, considers the case for either origin of du Guesclin's knighthood to be equally likely.

== See also ==
- List of Hundred Years' War battles
