= Castilian Civil War of 1351–1369 =

14th-century war of succession in the Kingdom of Castile

First Castilian Civil War
- Part of the Hundred Years' War
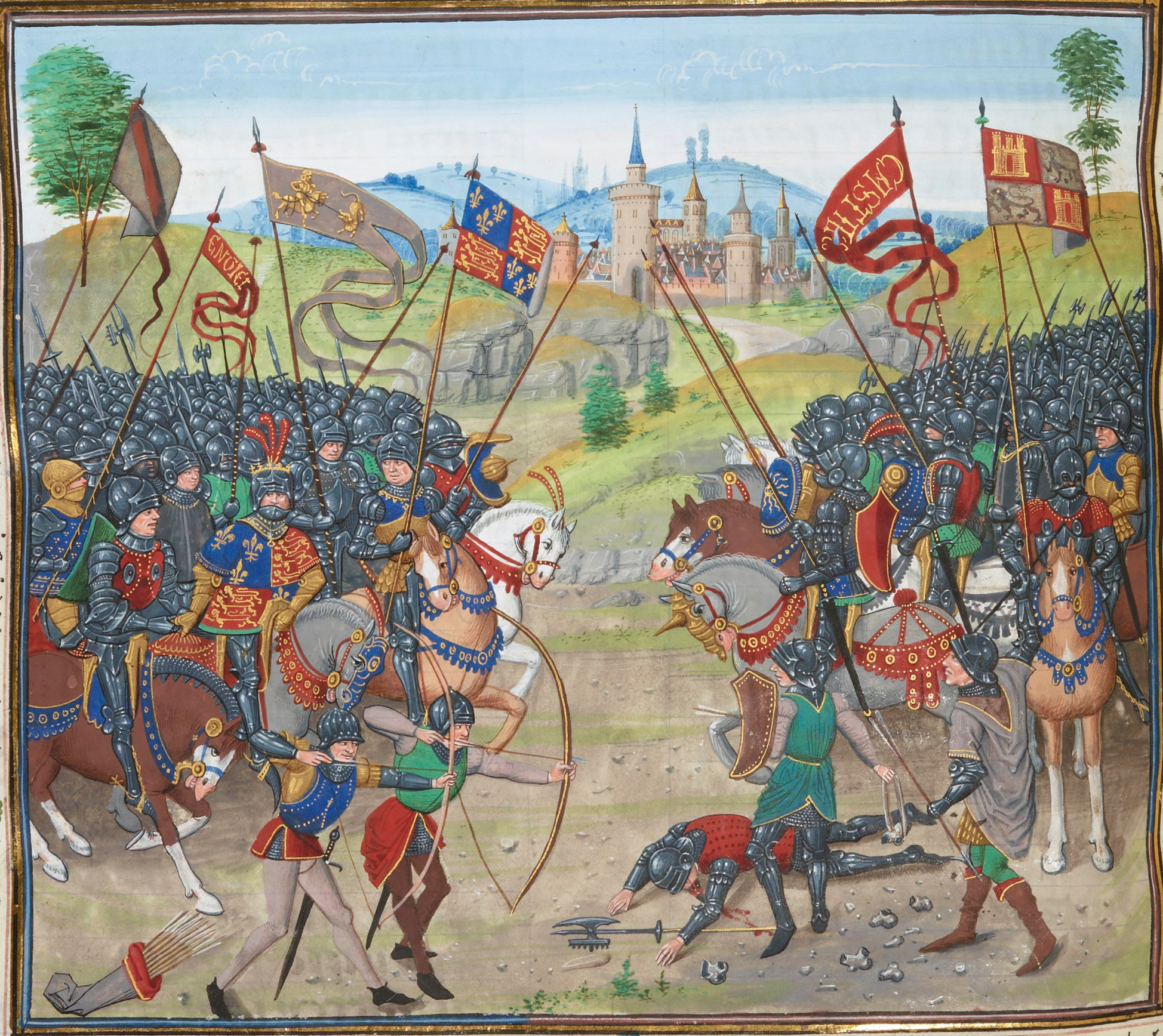
- Battle of Nájera, from a fifteenth-century manuscript, the English and Pedro are on the left while the French and Henry are on the right.
Date	1351–1369
Location	Crown of Castile
Result	Victory for Henry of Trastámara

Belligerents
Pedristas; Supported by: England (until 1367): Aquitaine; Genoa; Portugal; Navarre; Granada	Enriquistas; Aragon; Supported by: France

Commanders and leaders
Peter of Castile X Edward the Black Prince; John of Gaunt; John Chandos; Jean III de Grailly; James IV of Majorca	Henry of Trastámara; Peter IV of Aragon; Bertrand du Guesclin; Tello Alfonso of Castille; Alfonso of Ribagorza

The First Castilian Civil War was a war of succession over the Crown of Castile that lasted from 1351 to 1369. The conflict started after the death of king Alfonso XI of Castile in March 1350. It became part of the larger conflict then raging between the Kingdom of England and the Kingdom of France: the Hundred Years' War. It was fought primarily in Castile and its coastal waters between the local and allied forces of the reigning king, Peter, and his illegitimate brother Henry of Trastámara over the right to the crown.

== Causes ==
Peter was called by his supporters "The Just" and by his detractors "The Cruel". To the higher ranks of the nobility, he was a tyrant, forcing the royal will on hitherto free men. He had greatly extended the royal authority and had entered into a war with the Crown of Aragon (called "The War of the Two Peters").

His illegitimate brother Henry quickly obtained the support of not only the upper noblesse, but France, Aragon, and the Papacy. In 1366, he officially deposed his brother as king of Castile, León, Toledo, and Seville and had himself proclaimed king in the monastery of Las Huelgas.

== Conflict ==
In 1366, Henry, then living in France, assembled a large army, with both French and Aragonese components, at Montpellier and invaded Castile with the support of the kings of France and Aragon (Charles V and Peter IV respectively). He successfully forced Peter to flee.

Peter fled to Bayonne, a city in English-held Gascony. There, he petitioned Edward, the Black Prince, for aid and, in exchange for lands in Castile, received it. With English troops led by the prince, he returned to Castile and reasserted his royal power in 1367, forcing Henry to return to France after the successful Battle of Nájera (Navarette) and retook the crown. However, he refused to make good on his dealings with the English and his allies, including the Prince of Wales himself, who soon left. In 1368, Henry and Charles V of France signed the Treaty of Toledo whereby the Castilians lent a fleet in the Bay of Biscay to the French in return for military aid on land.

Henry entered Galicia, took some towns and then took the city of León in April. After this, the whole province of Galicia took sides with Henry. He reentered Castile in 1369, captured and murdered Peter after the Battle of Campo de Montiel. He was acclaimed Henry II and immediately solidified his rule by removing Jews from high office. Castile became, at this time, a stern ally of the French in their ongoing wars.

== Sources ==
- Wintle, Justin. The Rough Guide History of Spain. Penguin Group, 2003.
