= Siege of León (1368) =

Spanish siege of León in the Castilian Civil War

Coordinates: 42°35′57″N 5°34′02″W

- Part of the Castilian Civil War
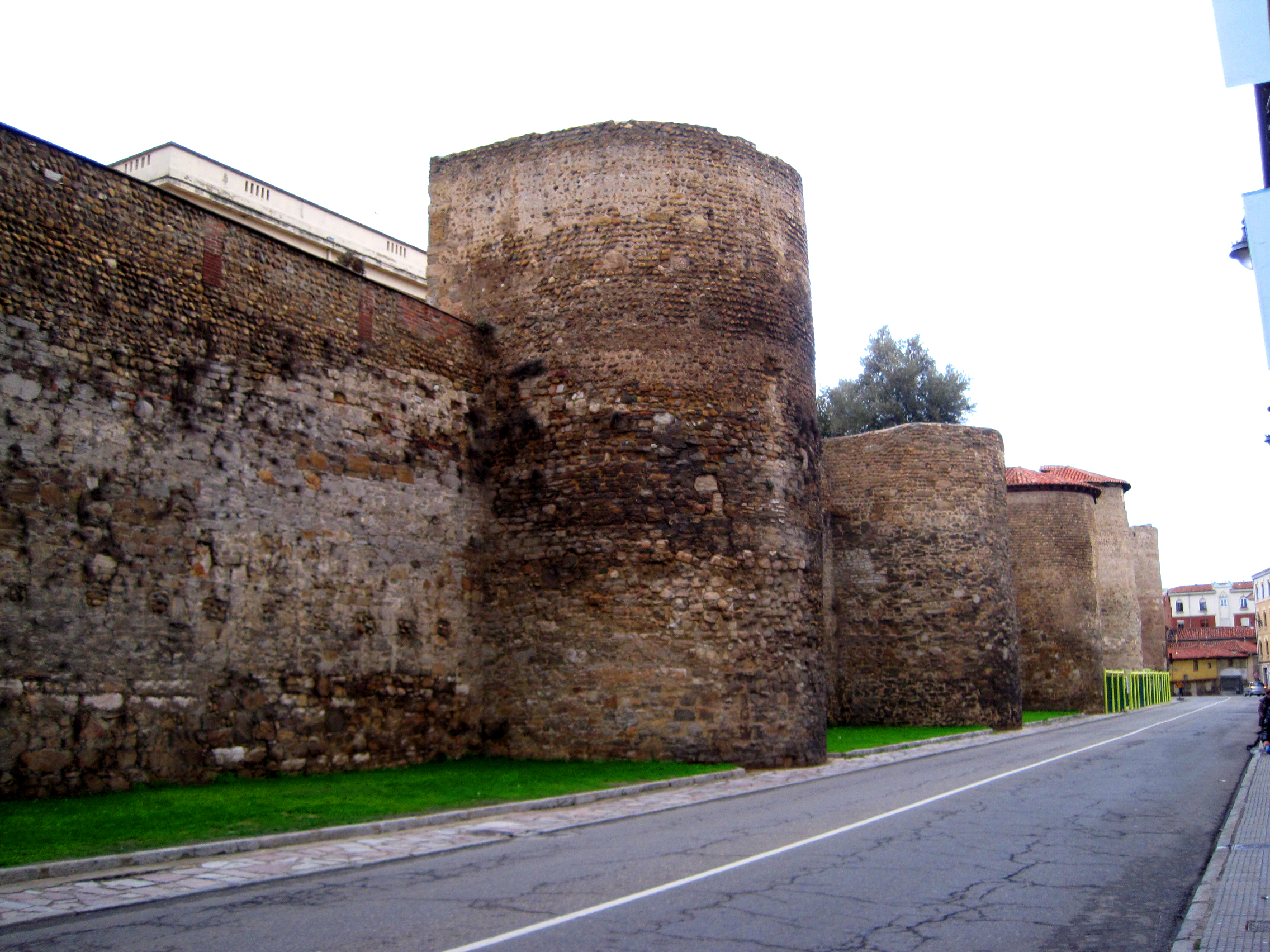
- Walls of León
Date	January – 30 April 1368
Location	León, Spain
Result	Henry victory

Belligerents
Castilians supporting Henry	Castilians supporting Pedro

Commanders and leaders
Henry of Trastámara	Unknown

The siege of León of 1368 was a successful siege of the city by the pretender Henry of Trastámara, in the course of the Castilian Civil War.

== History ==
In 1367, Henry of Castile, resoundingly defeated in the Battle of Nájera, went back to the Peninsula leading an army and taking Burgos. After seizing the town of Dueñas and its castle in mid-January 1368, Henry headed for the city of León, one of the capitals of the kingdom. León had remained loyal to King Pedro of Castile, and received his favors. Therefore, the city presented a strong resistance for several months, until the besiegers succeeded in seizing the convent of Santo Domingo, near the walls, and placed there a siege tower. Given the inability to defend the city, its defenders decided to surrender.

Upon the surrender of the city of León to king Henry, the whole Kingdom of Galicia did the same, and took sides with Henry.
