= Estrella Castle =

Castle in Montiel (Ciudad Real Province, Spain)

Coordinates: 38.6908°N 2.8700°W

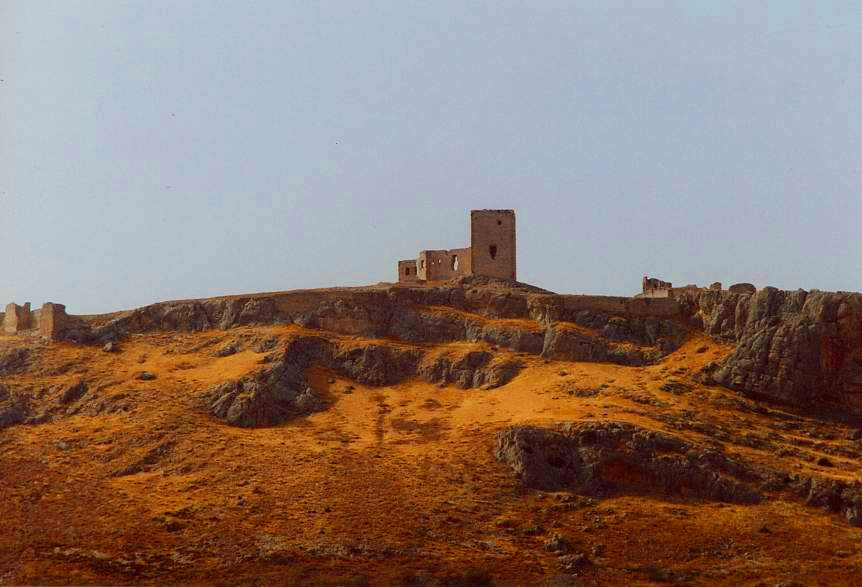
Castillo de la Estrella

Estrella Castle is a castle in Montiel, province of Ciudad Real, Spain. It was built by the Arabs in the 9th century and was renovated in 1226, after being reconquered by the Christians.
