= Bertrand du Guesclin =

Constable of France (1320–1380)

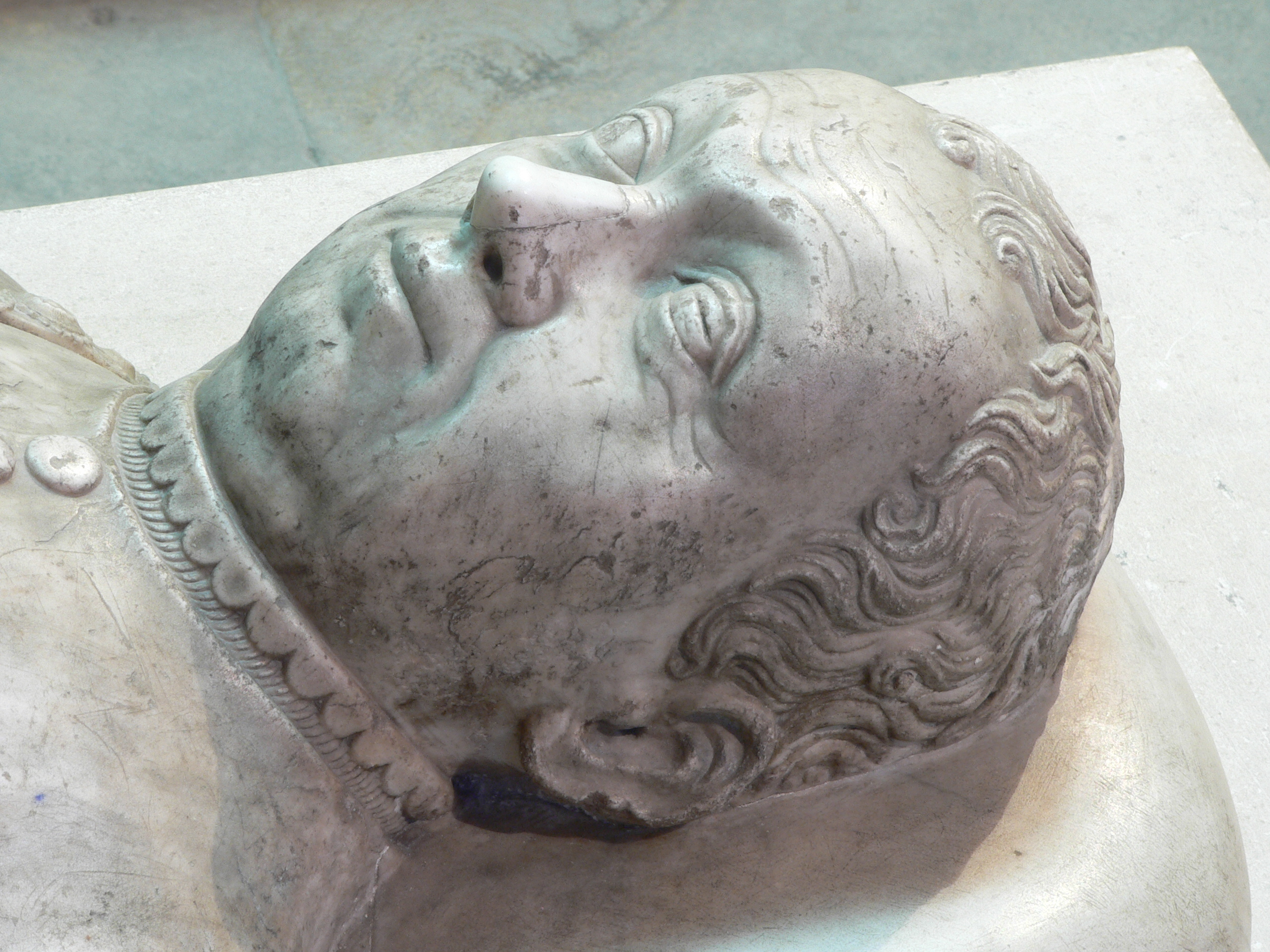
- Head detail of Bertrand du Guesclin's gisant (tomb effigy) in the Basilica of Saint-Denis in northern Paris, sculpted during the last quarter of the 14th century. The effigy was commissioned after du Guesclin's death by King Charles V of France
- Born: c. 1320; Broons
- Died: 13 July 1380 (aged c. 60); Châteauneuf-de-Randon
- Burial place: Saint-Denis
- Spouse: Tiphaine Raguenel (1363 - 1373)
- Military career
- Allegiance: House of Blois; Kingdom of France
- Rank: Constable of France
- Conflicts Battles: Hundred Years' War; War of the Breton Succession; Castilian Civil War Battle of Montmuran (1354); Battle of Cocherel (1364); Battle of Auray (1364) (POW); Battle of Nájera (1367) (POW); Battle of Montiel (1369); Battle of Pontvallain (1370); Battle of Chiset (1373)

Bertrand du Guesclin (Breton: Beltram Gwesklin; c. 1320 – 13 July 1380), nicknamed "The Eagle of Brittany" or "The Black Dog of Brocéliande", was a Breton knight and an important military commander on the French side during the Hundred Years' War. From 1370 to his death, he was Constable of France for King Charles V. Well known for his Fabian strategy of avoiding major battles where possible, he took part in seven pitched battles and won the five in which he held command.

== Origins ==
Bertrand du Guesclin was born at Motte-Broons near Dinan, in Brittany, first-born son of Robert du Guesclin and Jeanne de Malmaines. His date of birth is unknown, but is thought to have been sometime in 1320. His family was of minor Breton nobility, the seigneurs of Broons. His native language was Gallo, a langue d'oïl.

Bertrand's family may have claimed descent from Aquin, the legendary Muslim king of Bougie in Africa (Viking in effect, the legend conflates Saracens and Arabs with Normans and places Aiquin's origins in the north country) a conceit derived from the Roman d'Aquin, a thirteenth-century French chanson de geste from Brittany.

== Career ==
=== Service in Brittany ===
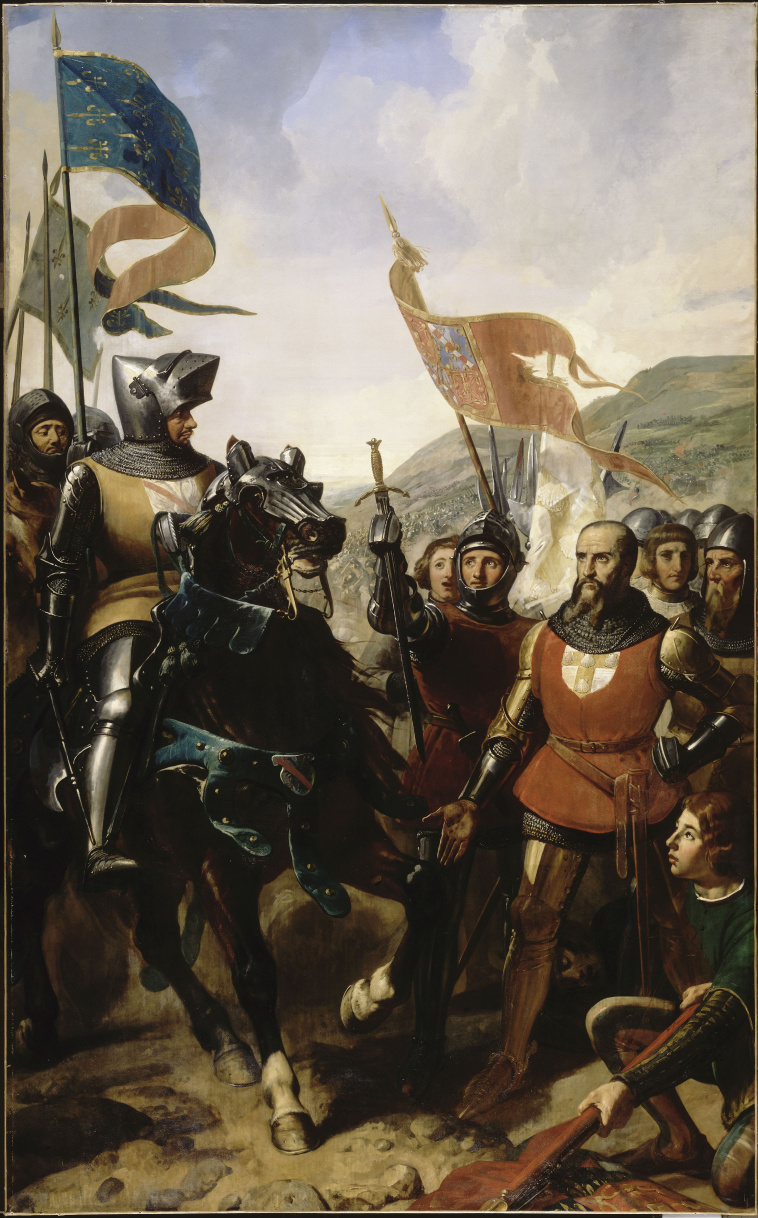
Guesclin at the Battle of Cocherel, by Charles-Philippe Larivière (1839)

He initially served Charles of Blois in the Breton War of Succession (1341–1364). Charles was supported by the French crown, while his rival, Jean de Montfort, was allied with England.

Du Guesclin was knighted in 1354 while serving Arnoul d'Audrehem, after countering a raid by Hugh Calveley on the Castle of Montmuran. In 1356–57, Du Guesclin successfully defended Rennes against a Breton-English siege by Henry of Grosmont, using guerrilla tactics. During the siege, he killed the English knight William Bamborough who had challenged him to a duel.

The resistance of du Guesclin helped restore Breton-French morale after Poitiers, and du Guesclin came to the attention of the Dauphin Charles.

When he became King in 1364, Charles sent Du Guesclin to deal with Charles II of Navarre, who hoped to claim the Duchy of Burgundy, which Charles hoped to give to his brother, Philip. On 16 May, he met an Anglo-Navarrese army under the command of Jean de Grailly, Captal de Buch at Cocherel and proved his ability in pitched battle by routing the enemy. The victory forced Charles II into a new peace with the French king, and secured Burgundy for Philip.

On 29 September 1364, at the Battle of Auray, the army of Charles of Blois was heavily defeated by John IV, Duke of Brittany and the English forces under Sir John Chandos. De Blois was killed in action, ending the pretensions of the Penthievre faction in Brittany. After chivalric resistance, Du Guesclin broke his weapons to signify his surrender. He was captured and ransomed back to Charles V for 100,000 francs.

=== Service in Castile ===
In 1366, Bertrand persuaded the leaders of the "free companies", who had been pillaging France after the Treaty of Brétigny, to join him in an expedition to Castile to aid Count Henry of Trastámara against Pedro I of Castile. In 1366, du Guesclin, with Guillaume Boitel, his faithful companion, leader of his vanguard, captured many fortresses (Magallón, Briviesca and finally the capital Burgos).

After Henry's coronation at Burgos, he proclaimed Bertrand his successor as Count of Trastámara and had him crowned as King of Granada, although that kingdom was yet to be reconquered from the Nasrids. Bertrand's elevation must have taken place at Burgos between 16 March and 5 April 1366.

Henry's army was however defeated in 1367 by Pedro's forces, now commanded by Edward, the Black Prince, at Nájera. Du Guesclin was again captured, and again ransomed to Charles V, who considered him invaluable. However, the English army suffered badly in the battle as four English soldiers out of five died during the Castilian Campaign. The Black Prince, affected by dysentery, soon withdrew his support from Pedro.

Du Guesclin and Henry of Trastámara renewed the attack, defeating Pedro at the decisive Battle of Montiel (1369).

After the battle, Pedro fled to the castle at Montiel, from whence he made contact with du Guesclin, whose army was camped outside. Pedro bribed du Guesclin to obtain escape. Du Guesclin agreed, but also told it to Henry who promised him more money and land if he would only lead Pedro to Henry's tent. Once there, after crossed accusations of bastardy, the two half-brothers started a fight to the death, using daggers because of the narrow space. At a moment when they fought on the floor, Pedro got the upper hand and was about to finish Henry. But then Du Guesclin, who had stayed inactive for he was compromised to both, made his final choice. He grabbed Pedro's ankle and turned him belly-up, thus allowing Henry to stab Pedro to death and gain the throne of Castile. While turning Pedro down, du Guesclin is claimed to have said "Ni quito ni pongo rey, pero ayudo a mi señor" (I neither remove nor put a King, but I do help my Sire), which has since that moment become a common phrase in Spanish, to be used by anyone of lesser rank who does what he is ordered or expected to do, avoiding any concern about the justice or injustice of such action, and declining any responsibility.

Bertrand was made Duke of Molina, and the Franco-Castilian alliance was sealed.

=== Constable of France ===
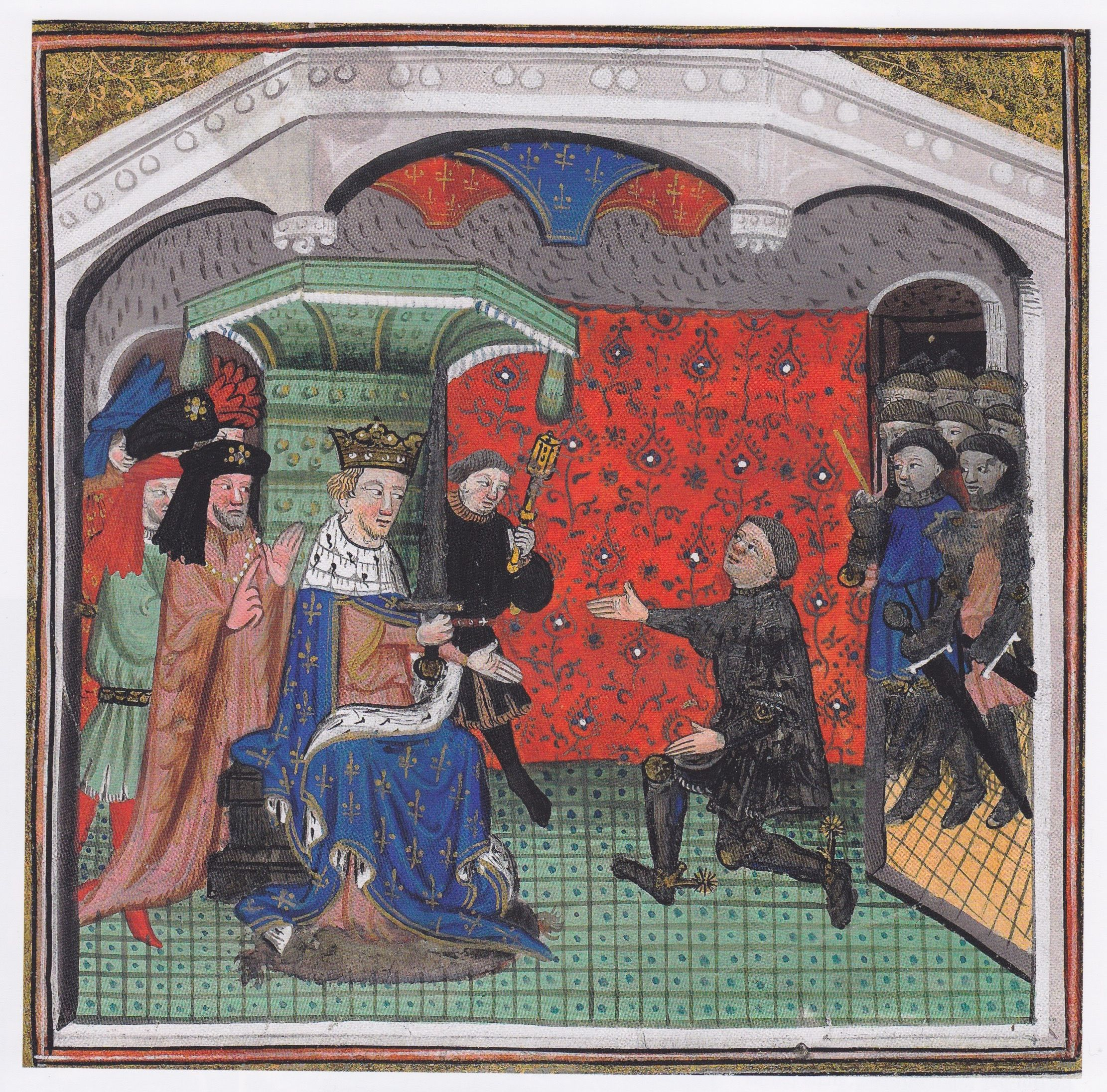
Miniature of du Guesclin being made Constable of France by Charles V, in the 15th-century Chronique de Bertrand du Guesclin

Du Guesclin's coat of arms.

War with England was renewed in 1369, and Du Guesclin was recalled from Castile in 1370 by Charles V, who had decided to make him Constable of France, the country's chief military leader. By tradition, this post was always given to a great nobleman, not to someone like the comparatively low-born du Guesclin, but Charles needed someone who was an outstanding professional soldier. In practice, du Guesclin had continual difficulties in getting aristocratic leaders to serve under him, and the core of his armies was always his personal retinue. He was formally invested with the rank of Constable by the King on 2 October 1370.

He immediately defeated the remnant of an English army, which had been led by Robert Knolles until his retreat at Du Guesclin's coming, at the Battle of Pontvallain, and then reconquered Poitou and Saintonge, forcing the Black Prince to leave France.

In 1372, the Franco-Castilian fleet destroyed the English fleet at the Battle of La Rochelle, where more than 400 English knights and 8000 soldiers were captured. Master of the Channel, du Guesclin organized destructive raids on the English coasts in retaliation for the English chevauchées.

Du Guesclin pursued the English into Brittany from 1370 to 1374 and again defeated the English army at the Battle of Chizé in 1373.

He disapproved of the confiscation of Brittany by Charles V in 1378, and his campaign to make the independent duchy submit to a French king was halfhearted.

==== Death and burial ====
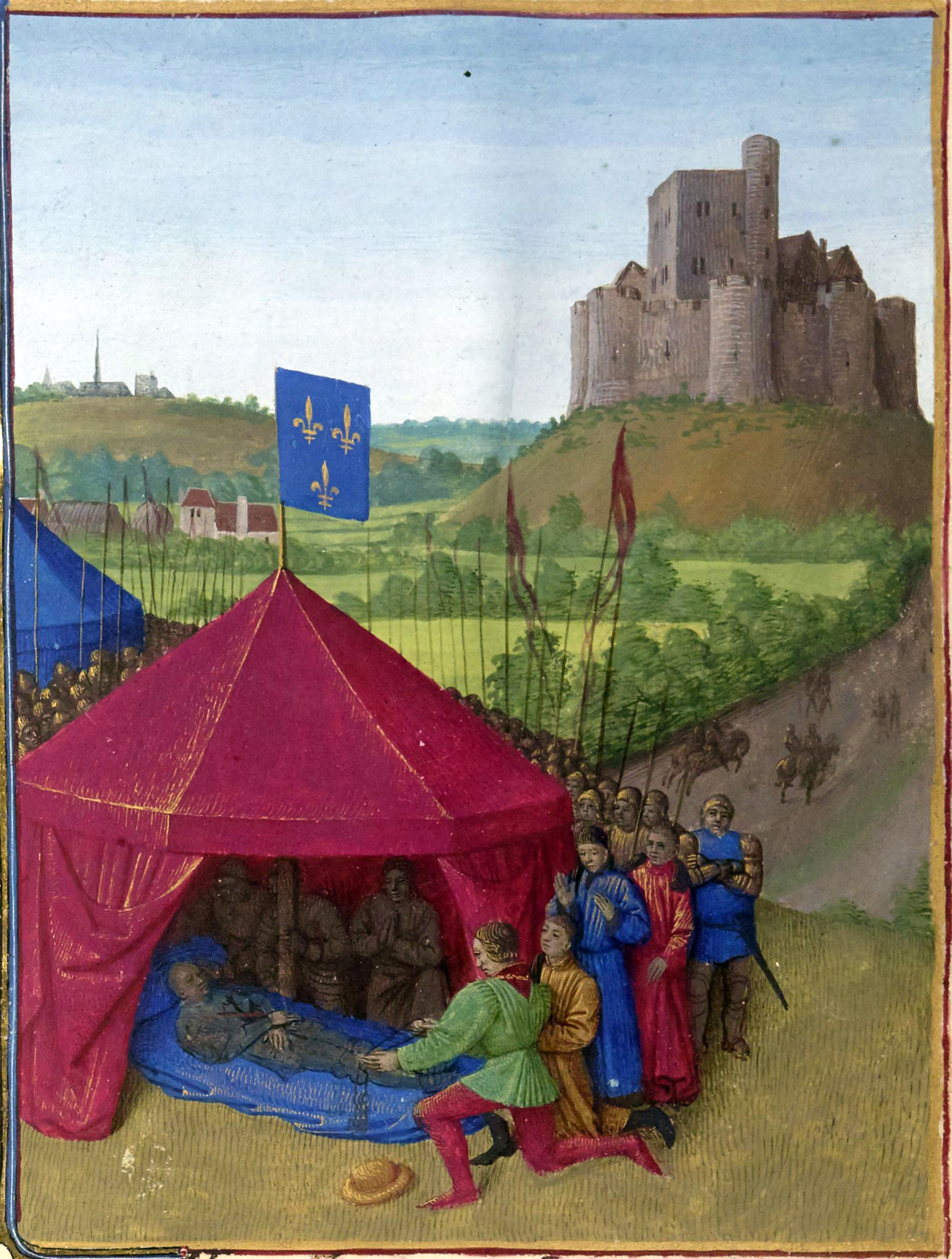
Death of Bertrand du Guesclin, by Jean Fouquet

An able tactician and a loyal and disciplined warrior, Du Guesclin had reconquered much of France from the English when he died of illness at Châteauneuf-de-Randon while on a military expedition in Languedoc in 1380. He was buried at Saint-Denis in the tomb of the Kings of France, which was later sacked and destroyed during the French Revolution. His heart is kept at the basilica of Saint-Sauveur at Dinan.

== Later reputation ==
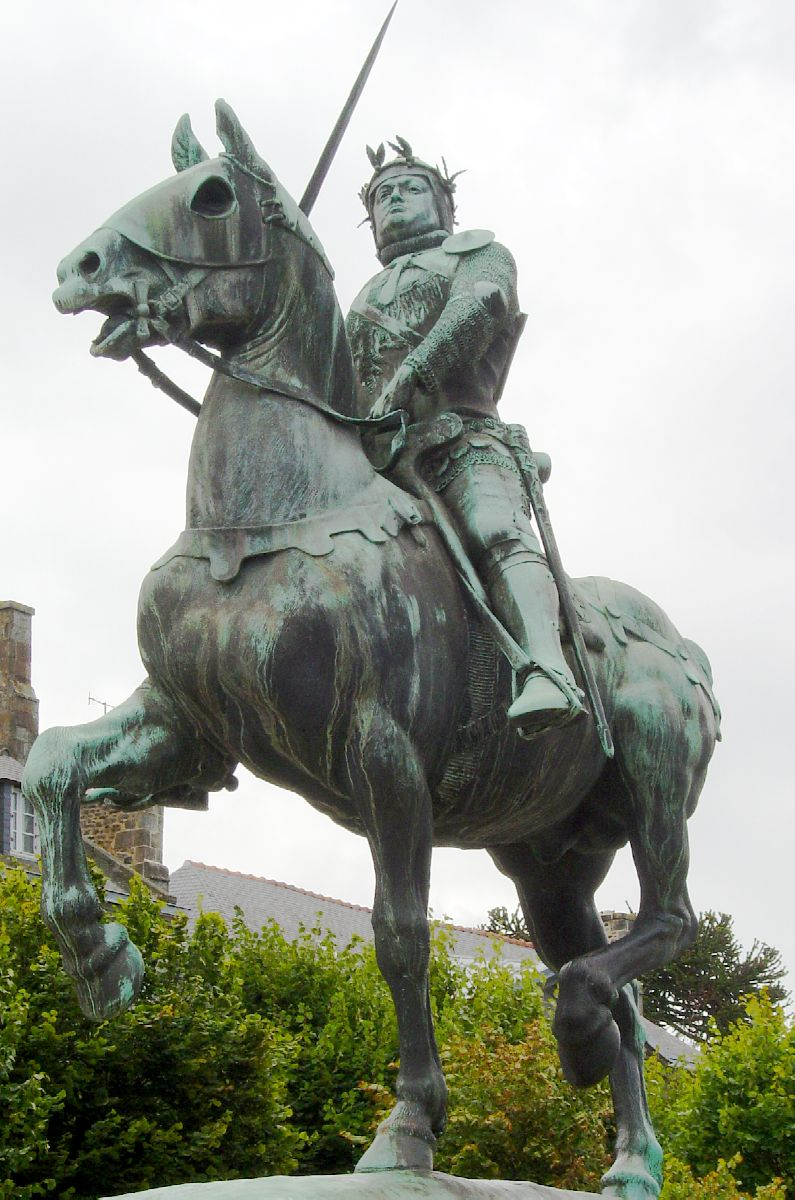
Statue of Bertrand du Guesclin in Dinan

Because of du Guesclin's allegiance to France, the 20th century Breton nationalists considered him to be a 'traitor' to Brittany. During World War II, the pro-Nazi Breton Social-National Workers' Movement destroyed a statue of him in Rennes. In 1977 the Breton Liberation Front destroyed a statue of him in Broons.

Bertrand du Guesclin appears as a character in Arthur Conan Doyle's 1891 historical novel The White Company, set in 1366. The protagonists first encounter him in Chapter 24, "How a Champion Came Forth From the East to the Lists", and again in Chapter 28, "How the Comrades Came over the Marches of France".

He is also a major character in a trilogy of Dutch historical youth novels, by Thea Beckman, the first part of which, Geef me de ruimte, was published in 1976. The main protagonist, a free-spirited young Flemish woman, ends up in Brittany during the 100 Years' War. She and her husband first meet Bertrand in 1353, and become his Trouvères in 1354 after the Battle of Montmuran.

Bertrain du Guesclin gets a favorable two-paragraph treatment in B. H. Liddell Hart's book Strategy. In the chapter Medieval Wars, Liddell Hart asserts "Other generals have maintained, in common with moneylenders, the principle 'no advance without security'; du Guesclin's principle was: 'No attack without surprise'."
