= Siege of Rennes (1356–1357) =

Siege of Rennes (1356-1357)
- Part of the War of the Breton Succession
Map of Rennes during the siege
A.	Mordelaise Gate
B.	Old Castle
C.	Church of St. Saviour
D.	Approximate location of the Raoul pasture)
Date	3 October 1356 – 5 July 1357
Location	Rennes, Brittany, France
Result	French victory

Belligerents
House of Montfort, Brittany; Kingdom of England	House of Blois, Brittany; Kingdom of France

Commanders and leaders
Henry of Grosmont	Guillaume de Penhoët; Bertrand de Saint-Pern; Bertrand Du Guesclin

Strength
1,500–4,000 men (Note: 1,000 armed men and 500 archers from Jean Froissart 4,000 from Cuvelier, figures reported by de Mauny (1974, p. 12))	Weak garrison

Casualties and losses
Unknown	Unknown

The siege of Rennes was an episode in the War of the Breton Succession during 1356-1357.

It was the third siege of the town during that war: between April and mid-May 1341, Rennes was besieged by Jean of Montfort, who finally managed to capture it. The city was repaired the following year by Blesist troops after several days of siege. Between the two events, Rennes had kept itself apart from the conflicts, until after the battle of Poitiers, when Henry of Grosmont, duke of Lancaster, came to besiege Rennes in October 1356, hoping thus to precipitate the end of the War of Succession.

== Unfolding ==
Rather than attempt to take the city by force, and despite its great numerical superiority, Lancaster preferred to establish a blockade to starve the inhabitants. At the time, the ramparts had not yet been extended to the suburbs that had developed outside the Gallo-Roman walls. It was the latter (renovated in the preceding century) that were besieged, the suburbs themselves ending up largely ruined.

After the Battle of Poitiers in 1356, in which Jean II the Good was taken prisoner, Guy XII de Laval hurled himself into Rennes with Viscount de Rohan and other lords, to defend the town which was besieged by Henry of Grosmont. This operation was doubtless carried out by Couanier de Launay at the request of his uncle Pierre de Laval, Archbishop of Rennes.

The defence of Rennes was undertaken by Guillaume de Penhoët, nicknamed the Twisted Lame One, who lived in the castle, helped by Bertrand de Saint-Pern, the commander of the town and godfather of Bertrand de Guesclin.

Because of the method used by the assailants, the siege dragged on, without glamorous military action. If it has remained famous, it is mostly thanks to the ruses deployed by the defenders.

=== The "miracle" of the St. Savior Church ===
In February 1357, some residents of Rennes heard underground sounds which made them understand that Lancaster had ordered the digging of a tunnel under the ramparts, hoping to make troops quietly emerge into the heart of the city. Informed, Penhoët ordered the residents of houses near the city walls to hang in their homes copper basins containing metal balls so as to determine the exact location of the gallery thanks to the vibrations caused by the mining work. Once the location had been established, a counter-mine was dug, and a troop of soldiers commanded by Saint-Pern massacred the sappers before setting on fire the beams that supported the gallery.

Alain Bouchart, in his Great Chronicles of Brittany, places the site of the counter-mine inside the church of Saint-Sauveur just under the crucifix. A later legend asserts that the statue of the Virgin and Child, situated in a chapel of the church, miraculously came to life and showed with its finger where they need to dig. A cult of this statue then developed, called Notre-Dame of the Miracles and Virtues.

=== The herd of pigs ===
An even more famous episode in this siege involved a herd of pigs (2000 to 4000 according to Michel de Mauny) which Lancaster, knowing the state of famine within the walls, made to feed in front of the Mordelais gates in order to lure the people of Rennes out of the town (Note: Michel de Mauny specifies the exact location : the Raoul meadow, which is now la rue Nantaise.) The captain of Penhoët again distinguished himself by having a sow suspended to a postern of the gate; its calls attracted the pigs, which ran into the town before the English could react. The townspeople, bursting with laughter from the ramparts, took advantage of the occasion to mock their besiegers, who were flabbergasted by the trick: 'You owe us wages, because we are now your pig-keepers'!

=== Du Guesclin enters the town ===
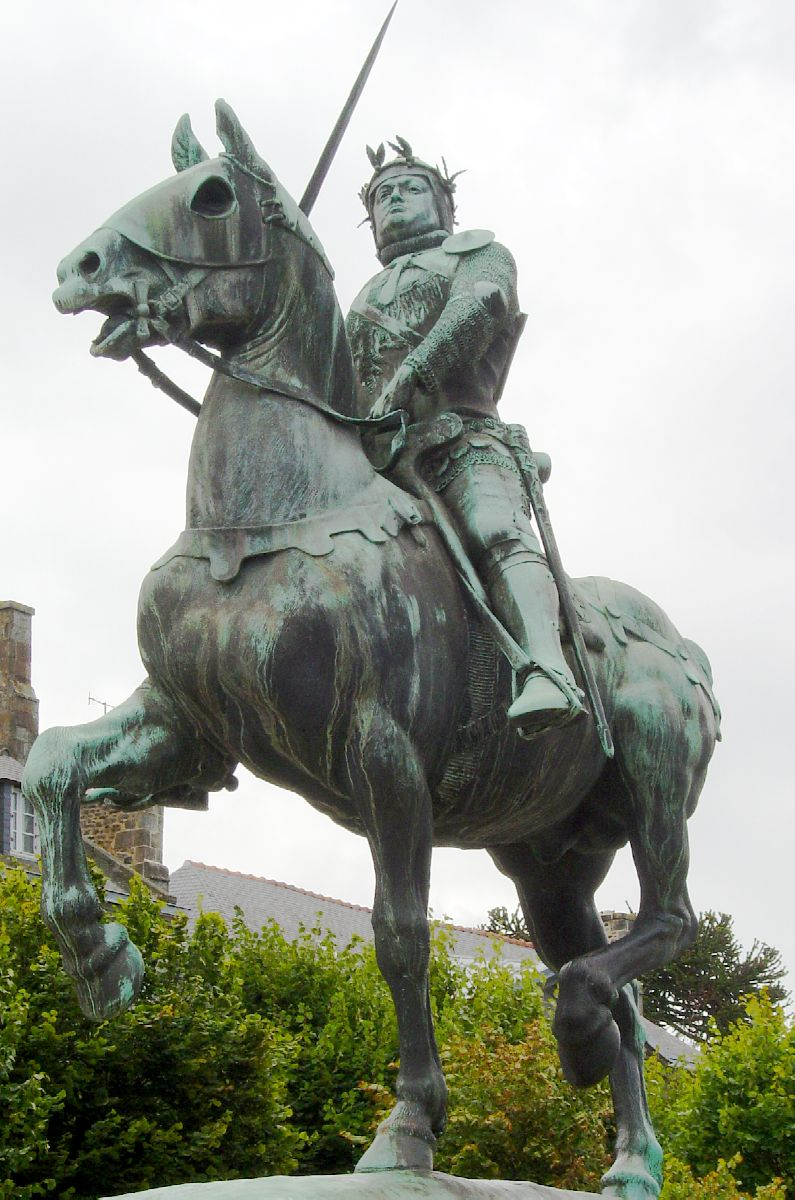
Bertrand Du Guesclin.

A little later, another reprovisioning was brought by Bertrand Du Guesclin, who entered the town with carts full of rations, distracting the attention of the English duke by this trick, making him think that this was the arrival of a troop of German mercenaries. His arrival galvanised the besieged people, and the following weeks saw a series of assaults and duels, Du Guesclin again distinguishing himself in one of these, against the English Bramborc.

== Outcome ==
If according to Michel de Mauny the siege was raised in February or March 1357 by relief forces led by one Thibaud de Rochefort, the other sources agree that the city was held to ransom by Lancaster. However, they differ on the conclusion which should be drawn from this.

The history of Brittany by Henri Poisson and Jean-Pierre le Mat states that the siege was lifted following a treaty between France and England, but indicates neither the date, nor the amount taken by the Duke from the residents. Jean-Pierre Leguay for his part specifies both: on 5 July 1357, the siege was raised at the cost of a ransom of 100,000 ecus, of which 20,000 were paid immediately in cash. He also indicates that this was a compromise between Lancaster and the residents of Rennes. The History of Rennes published in 2006, on the other hand, sees this as straight capitulation, the city's honorable defense being the only thing that spared it from all-out plunder.

== See also ==
- List of Hundred Years' War battles

== Sources ==
- Dom Morice [in French] (1742). Charles Osmont (ed.). L'Histoire de Bretagne. Vol. I. Paris.
- Leguay, Jean-Pierre (1972). "IV. Rennes aux XIVe et XVe siècles / Rennes in the 14th and 15th centuries". Histoire de Rennes / History of Rennes (in French). Collection Univers de la France. ISBN 978-2708947504.
- de Mauny, Michel (1974). L'ancien comté de Rennes, ou Pays de Rennes. La Grande et la petite histoire des communes françaises (in French). Vol. 9. Paris: Roudil. p. 135.
- Pichot, Daniel (2010). "La naissance d'une capitale / Birth of a capital". Histoire de Rennes. PUR. ISBN 978-2843983788.
- Poisson, Henri; Le Mat, Jean-Pierre (2000). Histoire de Bretagne (in French). illustrator Xavier de Langlais. Coop Breizh. p. 654. ISBN 978-2843460913.
