= Broons =

Broons Bronn
- Commune
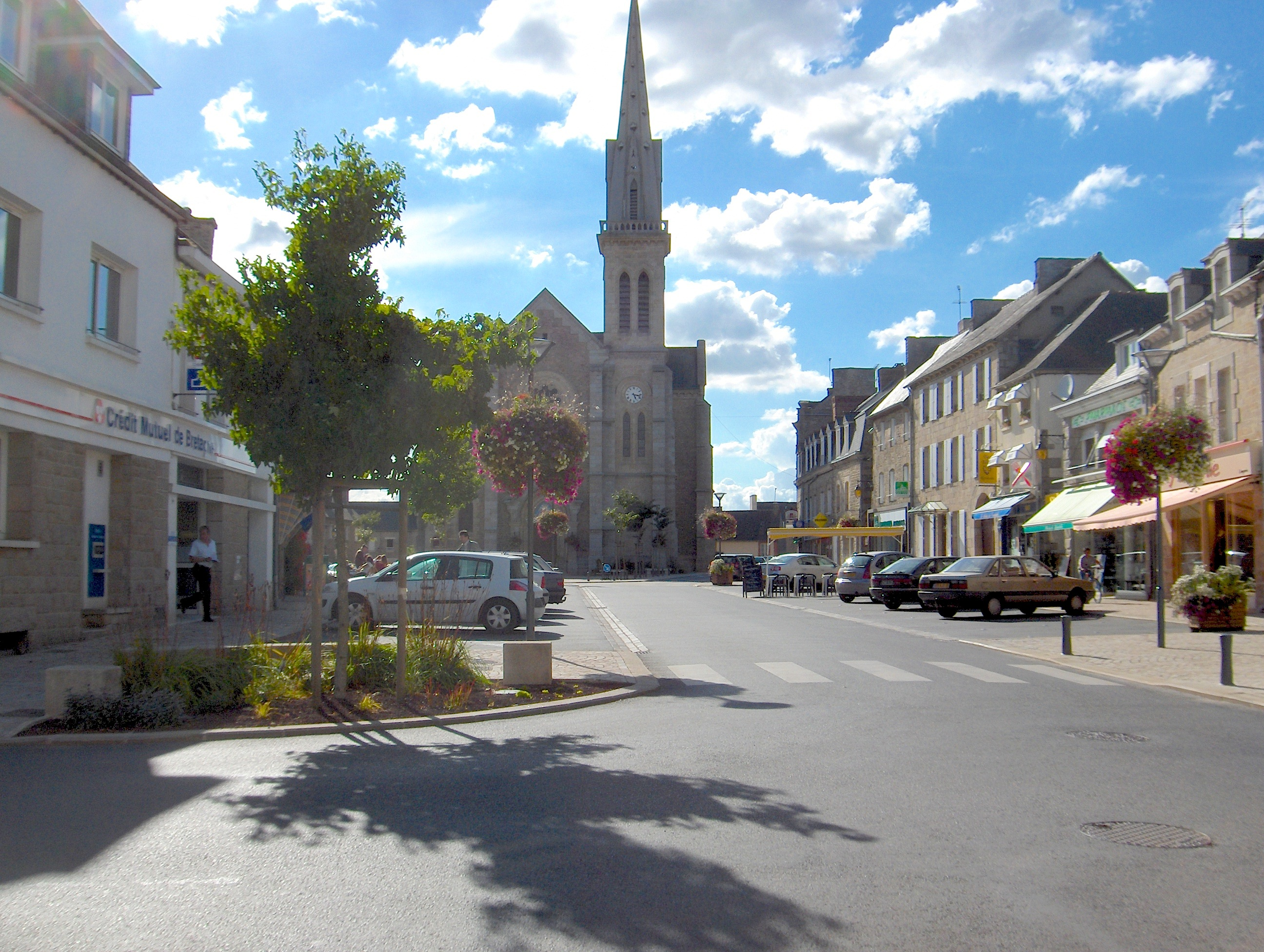
- The main thoroughfare of Broons

- Coat of arms
- Location of Broons
- Location within France Location within Brittany
- Coordinates: 48°19′05″N 2°15′34″W
- Country: France
- Region: Brittany
- Department: Côtes-d'Armor
- Arrondissement: Dinan
- Canton: Broons
- Intercommunality: Dinan Agglomération

Government
  - Mayor (2020–2026): Denis Laguitton
- Area^{1}: 35.21 km^{2} (13.59 sq mi)
- Highest elevation: 143 m (469 ft)
- Lowest elevation: 45 m (148 ft)
- Population (2023): 2,943
  - Density: 83.58/km^{2} (216.5/sq mi)
- Time zone: UTC+01:00 (CET)
  - Summer (DST): UTC+02:00 (CEST)
- INSEE/Postal code: 22020 /22250
- ^{1} French Land Register data, which excludes lakes, ponds, glaciers > 1 km^{2} (0.386 sq mi or 247 acres) and river estuaries.

Broons (French pronunciation: [bʁɔ̃]; Breton: Bronn; Gallo: Bron) is a commune in the Côtes-d'Armor department in Brittany in northwestern France.

The commune is listed as a Village étape.

== International relations ==
Broons is twinned with the town Neufahrn i.NB in Bavaria since 1971.

== Population ==
Inhabitants of Broons are called Broonais in French.

Historical population

Year	Pop.	±% p.a.
1793	2,099	—
1800	2,101	+0.01%
1806	1,857	−2.04%
1821	2,232	+1.23%
1831	2,455	+0.96%
1836	2,527	+0.58%
1841	2,502	−0.20%
1846	2,559	+0.45%
1851	2,506	−0.42%
1856	2,463	−0.35%
1861	2,569	+0.85%
1866	2,738	+1.28%
1872	2,644	−0.58%
1876	2,832	+1.73%
1881	2,757	−0.54%
1886	2,733	−0.17%
1891	2,756	+0.17%
1896	2,816	+0.43%
1901	2,812	−0.03%

Year	Pop.	±% p.a.
1906	2,867	+0.39%
1911	2,835	−0.22%
1921	2,511	−1.21%
1926	2,520	+0.07%
1931	2,408	−0.91%
1936	2,447	+0.32%
1946	2,442	−0.02%
1954	2,430	−0.06%
1962	2,340	−0.47%
1968	2,256	−0.61%
1975	2,432	+1.08%
1982	2,389	−0.25%
1990	2,327	−0.33%
1999	2,382	+0.26%
2007	2,786	+1.98%
2012	2,983	+1.38%
2017	2,886	−0.66%
2023	2,943	+0.33%

Source: EHESS and INSEE (1968-2023)

== Heraldry ==
Arms of Broons, derived from the arms of Bertrand du Guesclin	The current Arms of Broons, derived from the arms of Bertrand du Guesclin: Argent a double-headed eagle displayed Sable beaked and armed Gules, overall a bendlet Gules.

Ancient Arms of Broons	Ancient Arms of Broons. These arms are also found on blazons of the lords of Derval. Such arms are attested for a family surnamed Bron, originally of Lutry (Vaud, Suisse), in the 17th century.

Blazon: Azure a cross Argent fretty Gules.

== Personalities ==
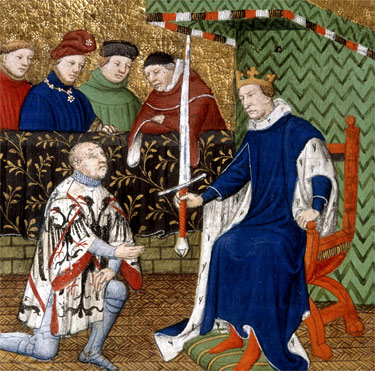
Bertrand du Guesclin, made Constable of France by the King of France.

- Bertrand du Guesclin, French knight and constable of France during the Hundred Years' War, born in Broons in 1320.
- Olivier de Clisson, French knight and constable of France.

== See also ==
- Communes of the Côtes-d'Armor department
