= Cuvelier =

Cuvelier is a surname. Notable people with the surname include:

- Florent Cuvelier (born 1992), Belgian footballer
- Henri Cuvelier (1908–1937), French water polo player
- Jean Cuvelier (1882–1962), bishop of Matadi
- Jehan le Cuvelier d'Arras (13th century), French trouvère
- Johannes Cuvelier (14th century), French writer
- Joseph Cuvelier (1869–1947), Belgian archivist and historian.
- Marcel Cuvelier (1924–2015), French actor
- Paul Cuvelier, Belgian comics artist
