= Battle of Montiel =

1369 battle in La Mancha, Castile

Coordinates: 39°0′N 4°0′W

- Part of the Castilian Civil War
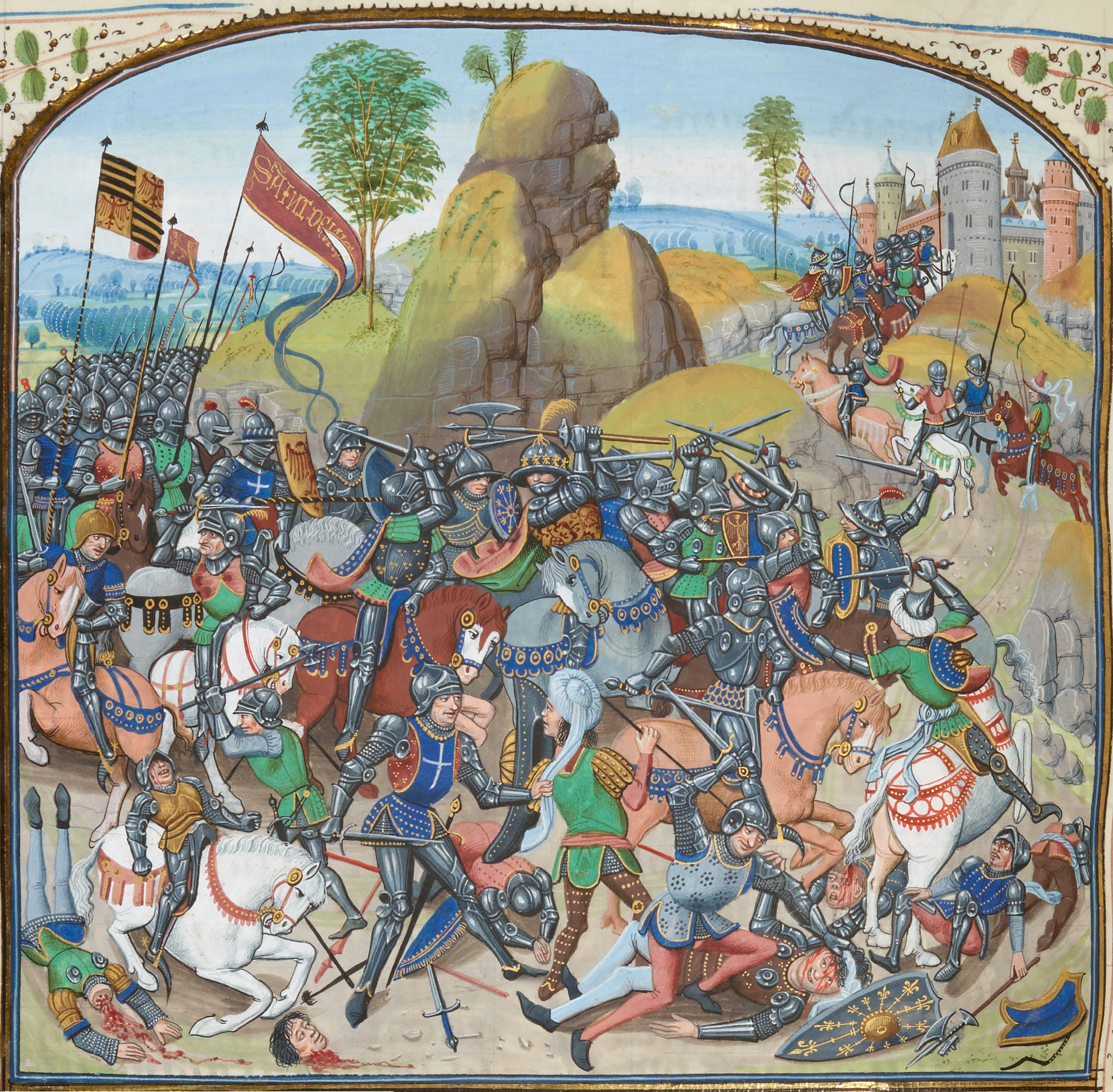
- Miniature of the Battle of Montiel from the "Chronicles" of Jean Froissart (15th century)
Date	14 March 1369
Location	Montiel, La Mancha, Castile
Result	Franco–Castilian victory

Belligerents
Castilians supporting Henry; France	Castilians supporting Peter; Granada

Commanders and leaders
Henry of Trastámara; Bertrand Du Guesclin	Peter of Castille †

The Battle of Montiel was fought on 14 March 1369 between the Franco-Castilian forces supporting Henry of Trastámara and the Granadian-Castilian forces supporting the reigning Peter of Castile.

== Background ==
In 1366 there was a civil war of succession in Castile. The ruling Peter of Castile's forces were pitched against those of his half brother Henry of Trastámara, a bastard of the former king. Peter was supported by England, Trastámara by the French. Edward, Prince of Wales (known as the Black Prince), in his capacity as Prince of Aquitaine, led the English forces and the French were led by Bertrand du Guesclin. The reason Edward represented Aquitaine rather than England, was to avoid the breach of a peace treaty between the French and English that was in place at the time.

The armies in support of Trastámara were defeated at the battle of Nájera in 1367, but Peter of Castile lost the advantage because he did not remunerate his ally the Black Prince. The Black Prince, also affected by dysentery, withdrew his support from Peter and returned to Aquitaine.

== Battle ==
The Franco-Castilian force was led by Bertrand du Guesclin, while Peter of Castile led a Castilian-Granadine force.

== Aftermath ==
After the battle, Peter fled to the castle of Montiel, where he became trapped. In an attempt to bribe Bertrand du Guesclin, Peter was lured into a trap outside his castle refuge. In the confrontation his half-brother Henry stabbed Peter multiple times. His death on 23 March 1369 marked the end of the Castilian Civil War. His victorious half-brother was crowned Henry II of Castille.

Henry made du Guesclin Duke of Molina and formed an alliance with the French King Charles V. Between 1370 and 1376, the Castilian fleet provided naval support to French campaigns against Aquitaine and the English coast while du Guesclin recaptured Poitou and Normandy from the English.
