= Battle of Chiset =

Battle during the Hundred Years' War

- Part of the Hundred Years' War
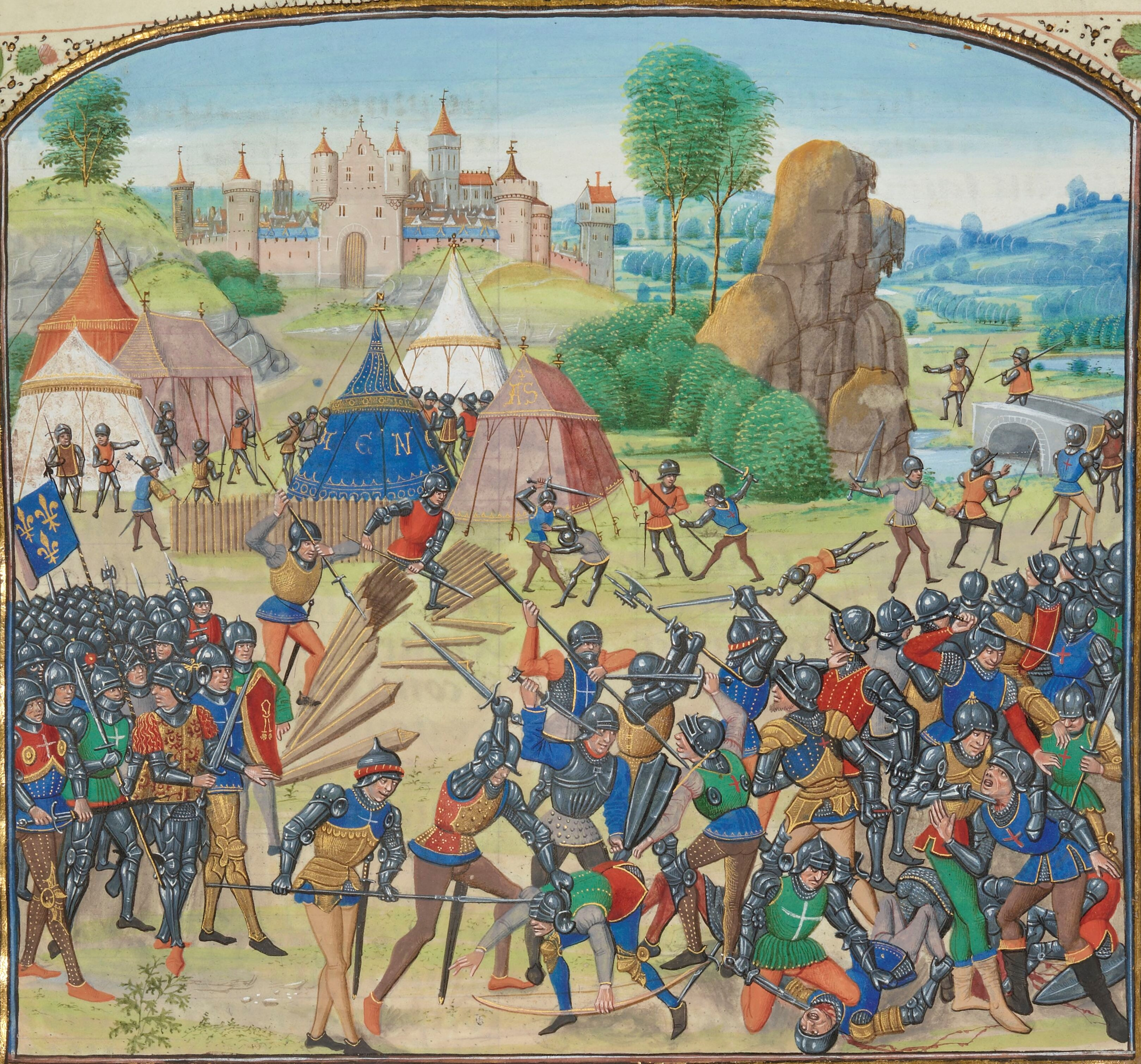
- Battle of Chiset, miniature from Louis of Gruuthuse's manuscript of Froissart's Chronicles
Date	21 March 1373
Location	Chizé, France 46°06′59″N 0°20′47″W
Result	French victory

Belligerents
Kingdom of France	Kingdom of England

Commanders and leaders
Bertrand du Guesclin	John Devereux (POW)

Strength
1,500	700

The Battle of Chiset also known as the Battle of Chizai or Battle of Chizé was fought at Chizé on 21 March 1373 between English and French forces during the Hundred Years' War. The French had laid siege to the town and the English sent a relief force. The French, led by Bertrand du Guesclin, met the relief force and defeated it.

It was the last major battle in the Valois campaign to recover the county of Poitou, which had been ceded to the English by the Treaty of Brétigny in 1360. The French victory put an end to English domination in the area.
