= Montiel =

- Municipality
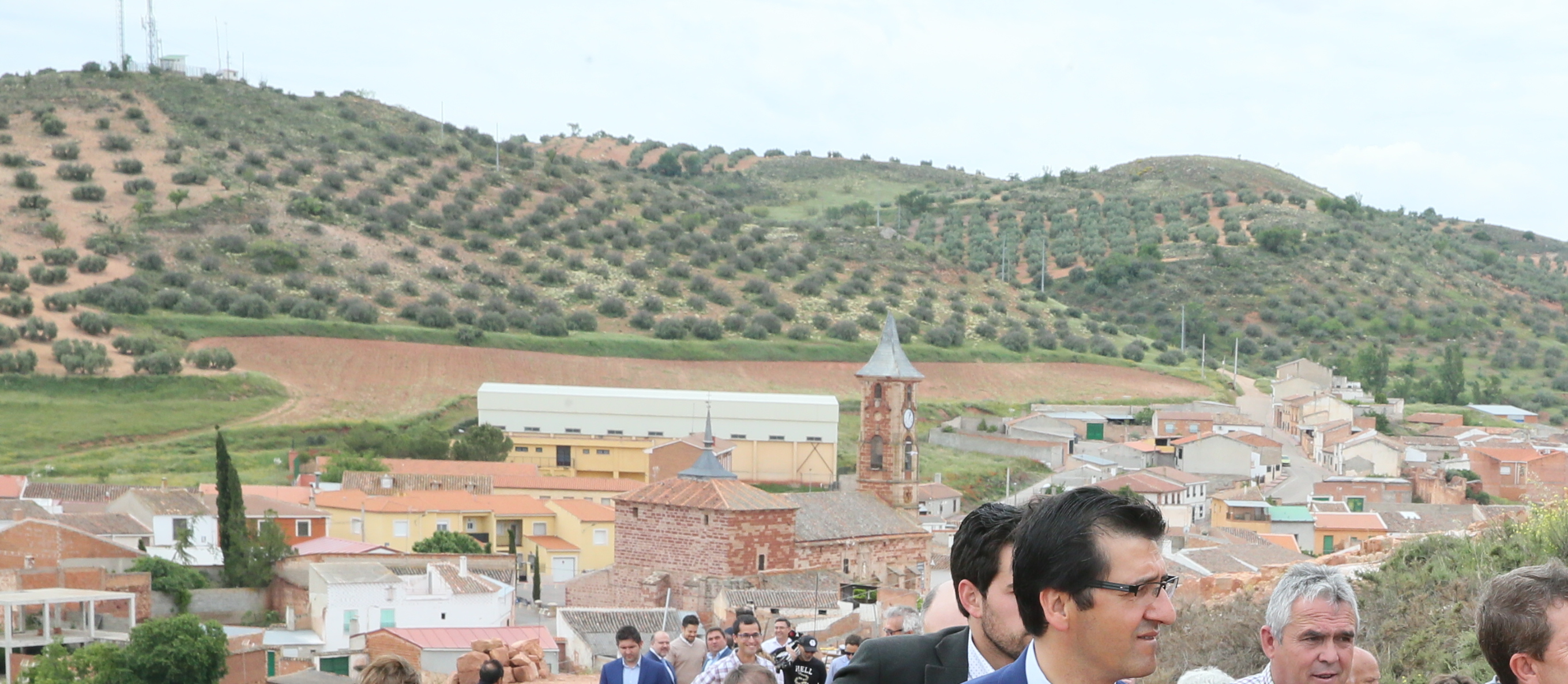

- Flag Coat of arms

- Location within Castilla-La Mancha Location within Spain
- Coordinates: 38°42′N 2°52′W
- Country: Spain
- Autonomous community: Castilla–La Mancha
- Province: Ciudad Real

Area
  - Total: 271.22 km^{2} (104.72 sq mi)
- Elevation: 900 m (3,000 ft)

Population (2025-01-01)
  - Total: 1,167
  - Density: 4.303/km^{2} (11.14/sq mi)
- Demonym: Montieleños
- Postal code: 13326
- Website: Official website

Montiel is a municipality of Spain located in the province of Ciudad Real, Castilla–La Mancha. The municipality spans across a total area of 271.22 km^{2} and, as of 1 January 2020, it has a registered population of 1,294.

== History ==
On 5 March 1227, Ferdinand III donated the Estrella Castle to Pedro González, Grand Master of the Order of Santiago, so Montiel eventually became the head of the Campo de Montiel lands. In 1243, Montiel was granted a fuero (a copy of Cuenca's) and a number of privileges by Grand Master Paio Peres Correia.

The Battle of Montiel occurred at the town. It was also the place where Peter of Castile was killed by Henry of Trastamara.

Historically, Montiel was home to a Jewish community in the Middle Ages, up until the 1492 expulsion of the Jews.
