= Attaque à outrance =

Military strategy

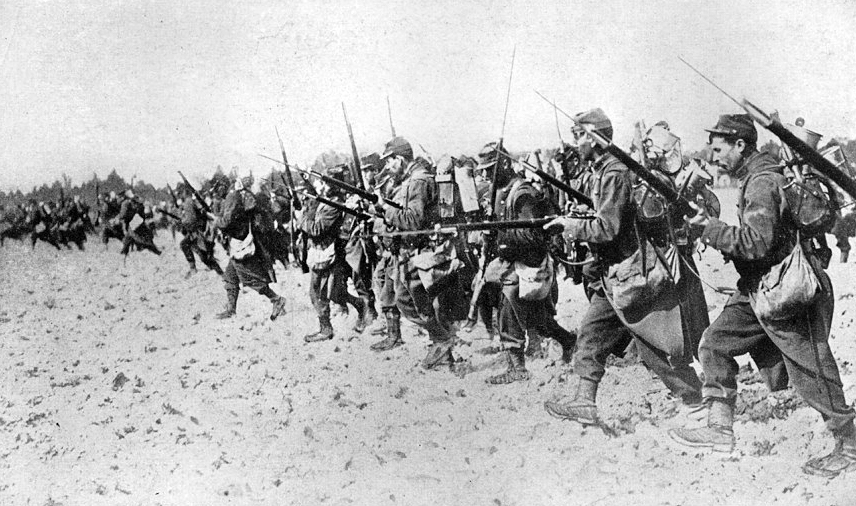
A French bayonet charge in 1913.

Attaque à outrance (French for "attack to excess") was the expression of a military philosophy common to many armies in the period before and during the earlier parts of World War I.

This philosophy was a response to the increasing weight of defensive firepower that accrued to armies in the nineteenth century, as a result of several technological innovations, notably breech-loading rifled guns, machine guns, and light field artillery firing high-explosive shells. It held that the victor would be the side with the strongest will, courage, and dash/energy (élan), and that every attack must therefore be pushed to the limit. The lethality of artillery, combined with the lack of mobility of infantry, as well as the subsequent development of trench warfare, rendered this tactic extremely costly and usually ineffective.

The philosophy is particularly associated with the French, due to its adoption by Noël de Castelnau in the First Battle of Champagne (1914), and by Robert Nivelle in the Nivelle offensive (1917). Joseph Joffre, French chief of general staff from 1911 on, had originally adopted the doctrine for the French military and purged the army of 'defensively-minded' commanders. However, all sides launched large, costly and futile frontal offensives in this style: the British at the Battle of the Somme (1916), the Germans in the First Battle of Ypres (1914), the Russians in the Brusilov offensive (1916), and so on.

The origins of this doctrine are traced back to the increasingly militarized 'Warrior Culture' that most European nations developed during the 19th century, where the ideal citizen was the soldier employed by his homeland. This predisposed officers and soldiers towards narrow ideals focusing on blind courage in the face of war's adversity.

== See also ==
- Cult of the offensive
- Human wave attack
