= Paul de Sémant =

French novelist and illustrator (1855–1915)

- Born: Paul Cousturier; 1855
- Died: 1915 (aged 59–60)
- Occupations: Editor, cartoonist, writer and illustrator

Paul de Sémant (1855–1915), whose real name was Paul Cousturier, was a French magazine editor and cartoonist; and a writer and illustrator of children's books.

He was one of the illustrators of the books written by Émile Driant under the pen name of "Danrit".

De Sémant also published political cartoons and illustrated books by Théodore Cahu and others.

== Cartoons ==
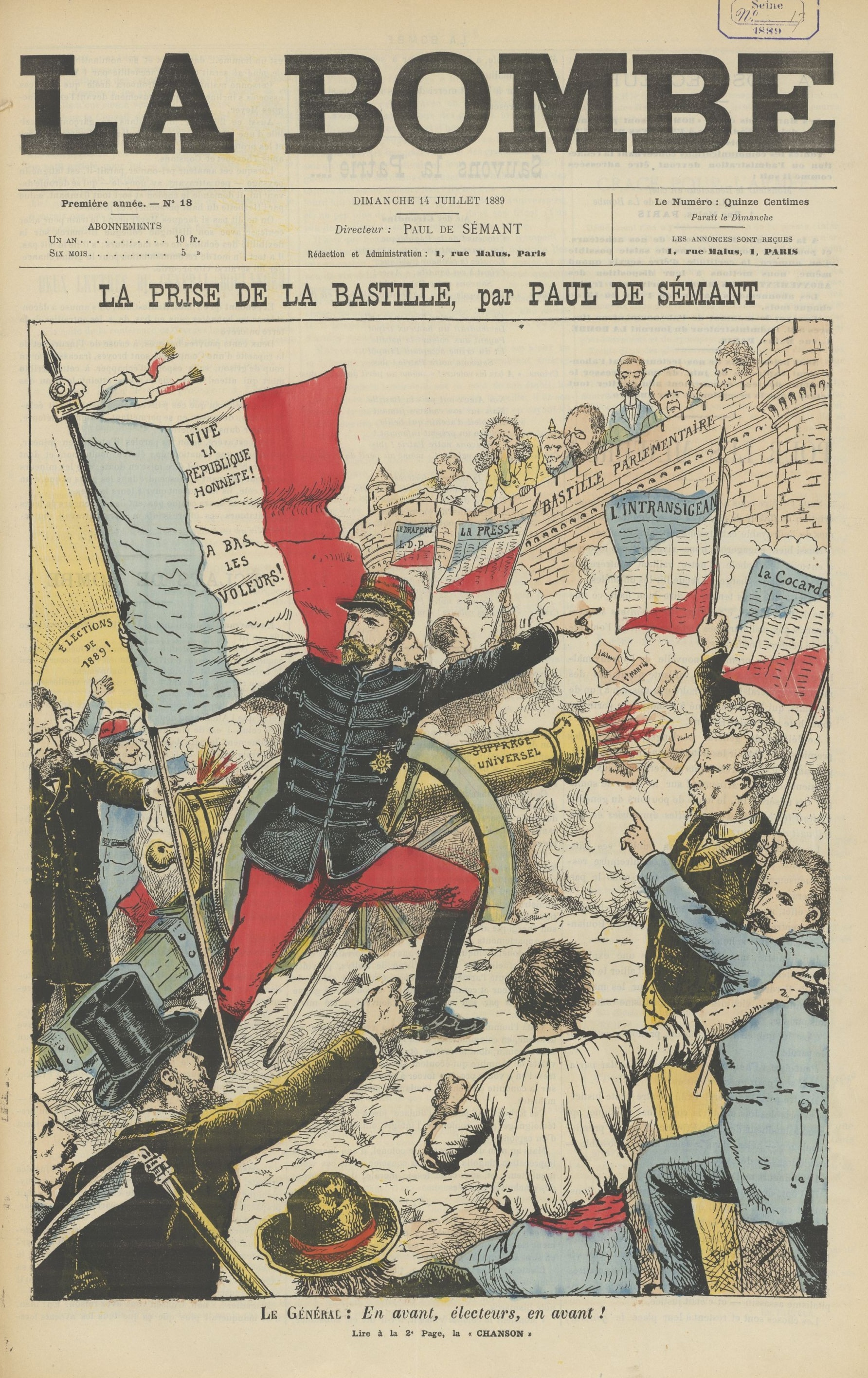
The Taking of the Bastille. Cartoon of Georges Boulanger from the La Bombe, 14 July 1889.

Paul de Sémant became an editor of La Bombe magazine, which supported General Boulanger to the consternation of the government, who feared Boulanger was planning a coup-d'etat. Some of de Sémant's works were published in the magazine.

On 7 April 1889, the Bombe published his cartoon Trop dure, trop haute, supporting Boulanger. On 2 June 1889, the Bombe published his L'Arme au pied in which he commented on the close relationship between prime minister Francesco Crispi of Italy and the Emperor of Germany.

On 14 July 1889, his cartoon La Prise de la Bastille again depicted Boulanger in heroic posture. On 28 July 1889, La Bombe published an open letter from de Sémant complaining of illegal harassment of the journal's vendors and seizures of issues by police. The 15 September 1889 issue of the Bombe was seized for a cartoon Vive Boulanger. Later that month, his cartoon A bas Ferry, vive Boulanger caused the magazine to again be seized because of injuries to the ministers Constans and Yves Guyot.

== Novels ==
Paul de Sémant began the series of African adventures of his hero "Gaëtan Faradel" with one that described the Trans-continental Nord-Sud-Africain, a railway project that had been advocated by the press. The stories alternate between the views of Africa as a place where wealth can be gained through colonial exploitation and the more romantic "hidden treasure" theme in the tradition of The Count of Monte Cristo or Treasure Island. Faradel and his friends destroy a troop of elephants and gain a great haul of ivory, they find a gold mine, and so on. They take these treasures with no thought of rights of the Africans to whom the resources belong.

His Les merveilleuses aventures de Dache, perruquier des zouaves is written for a younger audience than Faradel, but is also largely set in Africa, where the hero has series of adventures that are sometimes comical, sometime morally edifying. The hero, Dache, is orphaned at the age of one and adopted by a regiment of Zouaves who have saved his life. His adventures include fighting the Russians in the Crimea, the Austrians at the Battle of Magenta and the Prussian in 1870. However, most of the book concerns the colonial campaigns in North Africa, then closer to the equator in 1856–57, where he becomes ruler of an African tribe.

The book presents the nationalities whom Dache meets – German, English or African – in standard stereotypes of his day. The Africans in particular are treated almost as cartoon characters. The daily life of an African village is described in idyllic terms. The people simply gather the fruits and crops that grow wild or with little cultivation, raise cattle, sheep and pigs, and supplement their diet by hunting gazelles and antelopes. Ivory lets them purchase whatever else they need.

Paul de Sémant considered that Africa had no indigenous culture, and therefore it was right for France to forcibly impose civilization and moral values.

== Bibliography ==
Text and illustrations by Paul de Sémant

- Paul de Sémant. Les merveilleuses aventures de Dache, perruquier des zouaves. Illustrated by Paul de Sémant. Paris: Flammarion. p. 424.
- Paul de Sémant (20 May 2008). Le Fulgur. La Découvrance. ISBN 978-2-84265-572-3.
- Paul de Sémant (1891). Bébé sera soldat. Illustrated by Paul de Sémant. Paris: Emile Guérin. p. 48.
- Paul de Sémant (1900). Ce sacré Poilut !. E. Flammarion.
- Paul de Sémant (1900). Le Lac d'or du docteur Sarbacane. E. Flammarion.
- Paul de Sémant (1907). Le Dernier raid de Nelly Sanderson. Illustrated by Paul de Sémant. E. Flammarion.
- Paul de Sémant (1907). Gaëtan Faradel champion du tour du monde. Paris: Flammarion. p. 304.
- Paul de Sémant (1907). Gaétan Faradel explorateur malgré lui. Flammarion. p. 277.

Illustrations by Paul de Sémant

- Bidel (1888). Les Memoires d'un dompteur. Illustrated by Paul Cousturier. Libraire de l'Art. A reviewer described the illustrations as "very spiritual", saying they were not the least attraction of the work.
- Hector Malot (1891). Un beau-frere. illustrated by Paul Cousturier. Dentu.
- Théodore Cahu : Du Guesclin, Jeanne d'Arc, Bayard, Le conscrit de 1870
- Danrit : Histoire d'une famille de soldats 3 volumes : Jean Tapin; Filleul de Napoléon; Petit marsouin
- Danrit : La Guerre de Demain
- Lt. Burkard : Le quatrième Zouaves et les zouaves de la Garde. Flammarion ca 1890
- Edgar Monteil: Mémoires de jeunesse de Benjamin Canasson, notaire. Jouvet et Cie Editeurs 1897
- Theodore Cahu (1898). Histoire du chevalier Bayard. Illustrated by Paul de Semant. Societe d'Edition & de Librarie.
