= Moirey-Flabas-Crépion =

- Commune
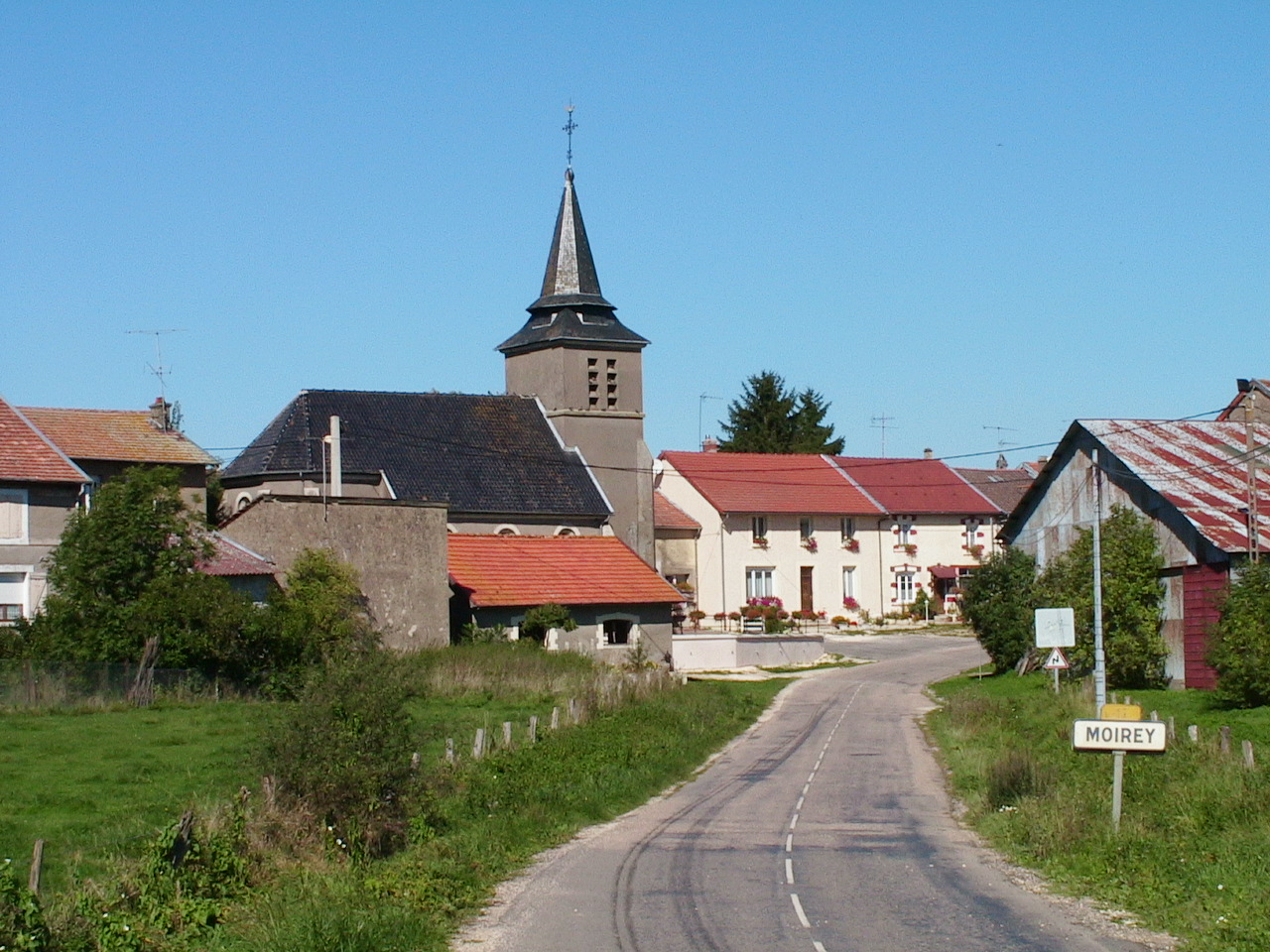
- The church and surroundings in Moirey
- Location of Moirey-Flabas-Crépion
- Location within France Location within Grand Est
- Coordinates: 49°18′25″N 5°24′13″E
- Country: France
- Region: Grand Est
- Department: Meuse
- Arrondissement: Verdun
- Canton: Montmédy
- Intercommunality: CC Damvillers Spincourt

Government
  - Mayor (2020–2026): Philippe Jacque
- Area^{1}: 14.62 km^{2} (5.64 sq mi)
- Elevation: 220 m (720 ft)
- Highest elevation: 362 m (1,188 ft)
- Lowest elevation: 211 m (692 ft)
- Population (2023): 109
  - Density: 7.46/km^{2} (19.3/sq mi)
- Time zone: UTC+01:00 (CET)
  - Summer (DST): UTC+02:00 (CEST)
- INSEE/Postal code: 55341 /55150
- ^{1} French Land Register data, which excludes lakes, ponds, glaciers > 1 km^{2} (0.386 sq mi or 247 acres) and river estuaries.

Moirey-Flabas-Crépion is a commune in the Meuse department in Grand Est in north-eastern France. It was created in 1973 by the merger of three former communes: Moirey, Flabas and Crépion.

== See also ==
- Communes of the Meuse department
