= 1312 =

1312 in various calendars
- Gregorian calendar: 1312; MCCCXII
- Ab urbe condita: 2065
- Armenian calendar: 761; ԹՎ ՉԿԱ
- Assyrian calendar: 6062
- Balinese saka calendar: 1233–1234
- Bengali calendar: 718–719
- Berber calendar: 2262
- English Regnal year: 5 Edw. 2 – 6 Edw. 2
- Buddhist calendar: 1856
- Burmese calendar: 674
- Byzantine calendar: 6820–6821
- Chinese calendar: 辛亥年 (Metal Pig); 4009 or 3802 — to — 壬子年 (Water Rat); 4010 or 3803
- Coptic calendar: 1028–1029
- Discordian calendar: 2478
- Ethiopian calendar: 1304–1305
- Hebrew calendar: 5072–5073
- Hindu calendars
- Vikram Samvat: 1368–1369
- Shaka Samvat: 1233–1234
- Kali Yuga: 4412–4413
- Holocene calendar: 11312
- Igbo calendar: 312–313
- Iranian calendar: 690–691
- Islamic calendar: 711–712
- Japanese calendar: Ōchō 2 / Shōwa 1 (正和元年)
- Javanese calendar: 1223–1224
- Julian calendar: 1312; MCCCXII
- Korean calendar: 3645
- Minguo calendar: 600 before ROC 民前600年
- Nanakshahi calendar: −156
- Thai solar calendar: 1854–1855
- Tibetan calendar: ལྕགས་མོ་ཕག་ལོ་ (female Iron-Boar); 1438 or 1057 or 285 — to — ཆུ་ཕོ་བྱི་བ་ལོ་ (male Water-Rat); 1439 or 1058 or 286

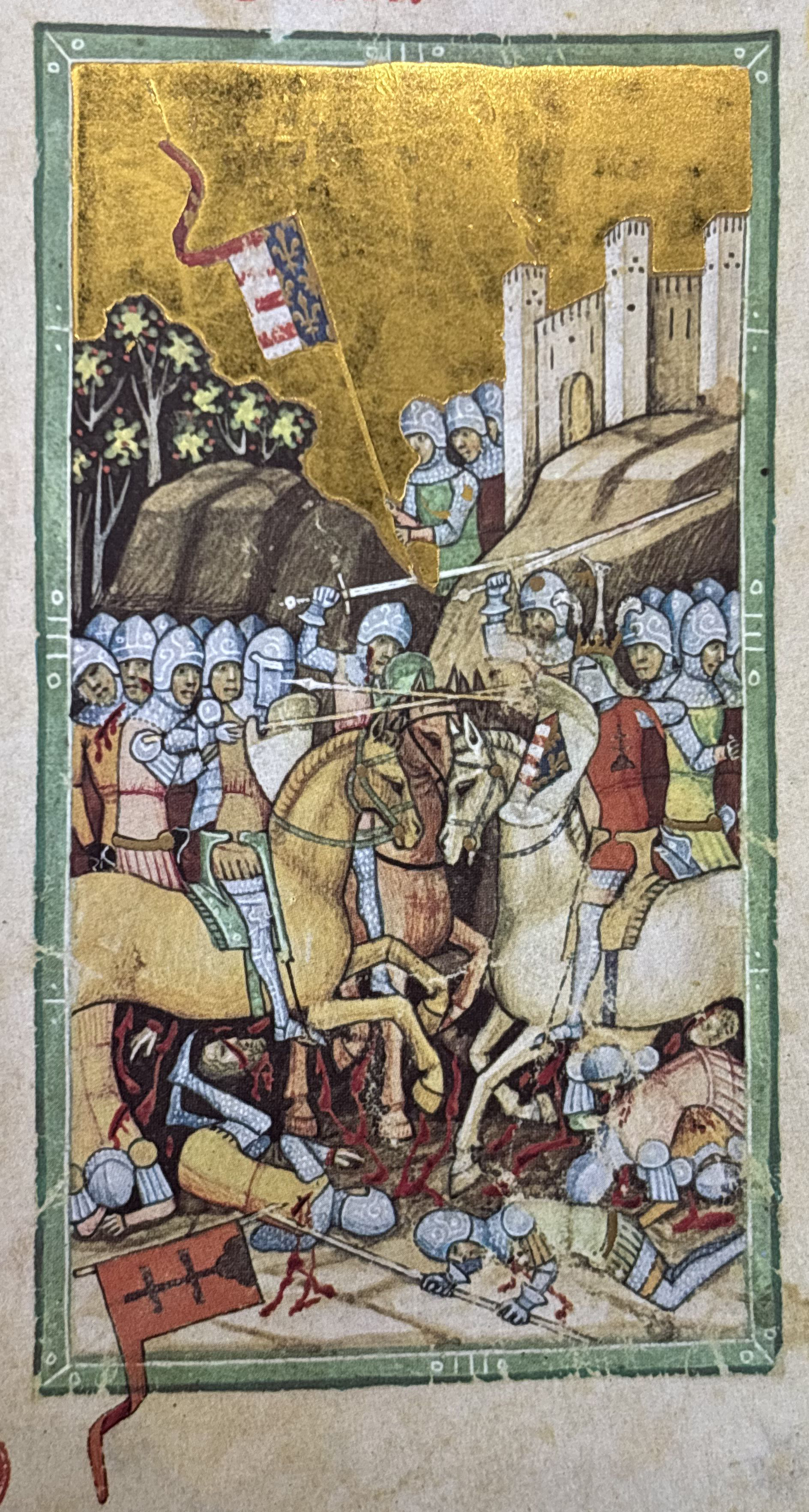
Battle of Rozgony, Chronicon Pictum

Year 1312 (MCCCXII) was a leap year starting on Saturday of the Julian calendar.

== Events ==
=== January – March ===
- January 13 – English royal favourite Piers Gaveston, having returned secretly from two months exile on the continent, is reunited, probably at Knaresborough Castle, with King Edward II, who on January 18 restores all Gaveston's confiscated lands to him. They plan to travel to Scotland to seek help from King Robert the Bruce.
- February 7 – In Scotland, Dungal MacDouall is forced to surrender Dumfries Castle to the forces of King Robert the Bruce. Despite having helped in the murder of King Robert's brothers in 1308, Dungal is allowed to go into exile rather than being put to death.
- February 20 – Öljaitü, the Ikhanate of the Mongol Empire's territory in the Middle East, carries out a purge of corrupt officials, with the arrest and execution of his vizier, Sa'd al-Din Savaji and one of Sa'd al-Din's closest aides, Taj al-Din Avaji,
- February 29 – The division of Greater Poland (Wielkopolska) is carried out by the sons of Henry III, Duke of Silesia-Glogau, with Konrad I and Bolesław receiving the eastern portion of Henry III's lands, and Henry IV, Jan and Przemko II retaining the rest.
- March 9 – Beatrice, Countess of Montfort, French noblewoman and co-ruler of Montfort, dies and is succeeded as Countess by her daughter Yolande of Dreux, former Queen consort of Scotland and wife of Arthur II, Duke of Brittany.
- March 22 – Pope Clement V, under pressure from King Philip IV of France, officially disbands the Order of the Knights Templar at the Council of Vienne, issuing the bull Vox in excelso. The Order's property and monetary assets are given to a rival order, the Knights Hospitaller. Meanwhile, Jacques de Molay, last Grand Master of the Knights Templar, is held in prison in Paris, where he is forced to commit false confessions.

=== April – June ===
- April 4 – At the Council of Vienne in France, a future Christian Crusade against a Muslim nation is approved by the 180 participants in the 15th Roman Catholic ecumenical council (including 20 cardinals and 122 bishops), convened by Pope Clement V. While agreeing that a Crusade should take place within one year, the parties disagree over where it should take place, with suggestions of attacking the Spanish Emirate of Granada, the Armenian Kingdom of Cilicia, or the Sultanate of Egypt. Although tithes will be collected from Catholic churches to support the venture, the proposed crusade never takes place.
- April 10 – The threat of a takeover by the Kingdom of France against the sovereign French Archdiocese of Lyon is ended when the Archbishop Pierre de Savoie signs a treaty granting King Philip the Fair the authority to administer the Lyon courts and law enforcement system.
- April 14 – In Germany, Frederick I, Margrave of Meissen signs the Treaty of Tangermünde after having been captured by Waldemar the Great of Brandenburg. Under the treaty, Meissen cedes its territory between the Elbe River and the Elster River to Brandenburg, and Frederick the Brave pays 32,000 silver coins to Waldemar.
- May 1 – Mladen II Šubić of Bribir becomes the new Ban of Croatia upon the death of his father, Paul I Šubić.
- May 2 – Pope Clement V orders the confiscation of all property of the Knights Templar in the papal bull Ad providam.
- May 4 – Edward II and Piers Gaveston are at Newcastle upon Tyne when they are alerted to the news of an English force under Henry Percy and Robert Clifford is heading for them. They manage to escape to Scarborough Castle.
- May 6 – The Council of Vienne (convened in the southeastern French town of Vienne, in the modern-day département of Isère) is closed by Pope Clement V almost seven months after opening on October 16. During its session, the Knights Templar organization was outlawed, the matter of a posthumous trial against the late Pope Boniface VIII was tabled and forgotten about, and a pledge was made to raise tithes and offerings for a new crusade to someday be made against the Muslims. A medieval historian, John of Saint-Victor, writes later that "It was said by many that the council was created for the purpose of extorting money."
- May 13 – Frederick IV becomes the new Duke of Lorraine upon the death of his father, Theobald II.
- May 19 – Scarborough Castle is captured by English forces under the command of Aymer de Valence, 2nd Earl of Pembroke after a two-week siege with the surrender of Piers Gaveston, 1st Earl of Cornwall, after Aymer gives his word that Gaveston will not be harmed.
- May 28 – After the Emir Abu al-Juyush Nasr of Granada asks for help from King Ferdinand IV of Castile, the Kingdom of Castile's forces, commanded by Peter of Castile, Lord of Cameros, Ferdinand's son of King Sancho IV, defeats the rebel Granadan Governor of Malaga, Abu Said Faraj in battle. Abu Said is allowed to retain his post as Governor of Málaga and resumes paying tributes to the Emir.
- June 15 – Battle of Rozgony: Hungarian forces led by King Charles I defeat the family of Palatine Amadeus Aba near Rozgony. During the battle, Charles losses his royal standard, but is reinforced by German mercenaries from Košice (now part of the Republic of Slovakia). The rebel army is routed, and Charles extends his power base in Hungary. His position is secured and resistance (reduced by the magnates' opposition) against Charles' rule comes to an end.
- June 19 – One month after surrendering Scarborough Castle to the Earl of Pembroke and having his life spared, Piers Gaveston, 1st Earl of Cornwall is executed at Blacklow Hill after having been taken hostage by Guy de Beauchamp, 10th Earl of Warwick and put in a dungeon at Warwick Castle.
- June 29 – Henry VII is crowned emperor of the Holy Roman Empire in the Lateran Palace, since St Peter's Basilica is occupied by Romans hostile to him.

=== July – September ===
- July 6 (1 Showa, 2nd day of 6th month) – Hirotoki Hojo becomes the regent for the Kamakura shogunate in Japan.
- July 8 – In Italy, Francesco I Pico, Lord of Mirandola, is captured at Baggiovara by Guelph rebels in Bologna, while on his way home to Mirandola after being invested by the Holy Roman Emperor, Henry VII as imperial vicar. Pico is imprisoned for the next nine months before being released to resume his Lordship.
- July 13
  - Giovanni Soranzo is elected as the new Doge to lead the Republic of Venice, 10 days after the death of the Doge Marino Zorzi and will serve for the next 18 years.
  - King Ferdinand IV of Castile leaves his palace at Ávila for the last time, placing his son Prince Alfonso in charge, and arrives in Toledo before proceeding to the province of Jaén to join his younger brother.
- August 27 – In France, Jean III, nicknamed "John the Good" becomes the new Duke of Brittany upon the death of his father, Arthur II.
- September 7 – King Ferdinand IV of Castile dies after a 17-year reign and is succeeded by his one-year-old son Alfonso XI. King Alfonso's mother, Queen consort Constance, becomes regent.
- September 27 – The Charter of Kortenberg is signed, and is possibly the first constitution which allows democratic decisions in feudal mainland Europe.

=== October – December ===
- October 13 – Özbeg Khan, the Mongol ruler of much of Russia, demands that the Middle East Mongol ruler Öljaitü cede to him the Azerbaijan territory of modern-day Iran.
- October 31 – Henry VII, Holy Roman Emperor abandons his campaign against Florence.
- November 9 – Otto III, Duke of Lower Bavaria and former King of Hungary, dies at his capital at Landshut (Niederbayern). Otto had shared power with his two brothers Louis III (who died in 1296) and Stephen I (who died in 1310), and the only heirs are the minor children of Stephen, 7-year-old Henry XIV and 5-year-old Otto IV, and Otto's 2-month-old son Henry XV, Duke of Bavaria.
- November 13 – Four years after the marriage of King Edward II of England and Queen consort Isabella, an heir to the throne is born at Windsor Castle, and will be christened four days later. Prince Edward. Upon the death of Edward II in 1327, his son will be crowned King Edward III at the age of 14.
- December 7 – Michael II, Syrian Orthodox patriarch of Antioch, dies after a service of 20 years. Michael III Yeshu will be elected his successor.
- December 13 – John Hotham is appointed as the new Chancellor of the Exchequer in England by King Edward and serves for three and a half years.
- December 15 – In Germany, Henry II the Lion, ruler of Mecklenburg, succeeds in his conquest of the Lordship of Rostock, at the time a protectorate of King Eric VI Menved of Denmark.
- December 23 – At Avignon in France, Pope Clement V elevates nine bishops, all French, to the position of Roman Catholic cardinals. The nine include Jacques d'Euse, Bishop of Avignon, who will be elected Pope John XXII as Clement's successor in 1316.

== By place (date unknown) ==
=== Europe ===
- Battle of Amorgos: A Knights Hospitaller fleet intercepts and destroys a Turkish fleet near the island of Amorgos. During the battle, all 23 Turkish ships are burnt.
- Winter – Battle of Gallipoli: A combined Byzantine-Serbian force (supported by a Genoese fleet) defeats the Turcopoles (some 2,000 men) at Gallipoli.

==== Middle East ====
- Öljaitü of the Ilkhanate briefly raids into Syria, with Siege of Al-Rahba. He withdraws in the same year, ending the Mongol invasions of the Levant

==== Africa ====
- Mansa Musa becomes ruler of the Mali Empire, guiding his realm through its prosperous years, enhancing trade, expanding borders and sponsoring mosques (approximate date).
- The Canary Islands are "rediscovered" by Lancelotto Malocello, Genoese navigator, who sails to Lanzarote, and remains there for almost two decades.

== Births ==
- September 17 – William Donn de Burgh, Irish nobleman (d. 1333)
- November 13 – Edward III, king of England and Ireland (d. 1377)
- William II, Latin prince and knight (House of Barcelona) (d. 1338)

== Deaths ==
- January 23 – Isabella of Villehardouin, Latin princess (b. 1263)
- March 9 – Beatrice, French noblewoman and co-ruler (b. 1249)
- March 10 – Casimir of Bytom, Polish nobleman (House of Piast)
- May 1 – Paul I, Croatian nobleman, knight and oligarch (b. 1245)
- May 13 – Theobald II, Duke of Lorraine, German nobleman (b. 1263)
- June 19 – Piers Gaveston, 1st Earl of Cornwall, English nobleman and knight (b. 1284)
- August 27 – Angelo da Foligno, Italian priest (b. 1226)
- September 7 – Ferdinand IV, king of Castile and León (b. 1285)
- October 27
  - Gentile Portino da Montefiore, Italian cardinal-priest (b. 1240)
  - John II, Duke of Brabant, Dutch nobleman and knight (b. 1275)
- October 28 – Elisabeth of Carinthia, queen of Germany (b. 1262)
- October 29 – Landolfo Brancaccio, Italian aristocrat and cardinal
- November 2 – Afonso of Portugal, Portuguese prince (b. 1263)
- November 6 – Christina von Stommeln, German nun (b. 1242)
- November 9 – Mujū Dōkyō, Japanese Buddhist monk (b. 1227)
- December 7 – Michael II, Syrian Orthodox patriarch of Antioch
- December 13 – John the Parricide, German nobleman (b. 1290)
- Eschiva of Ibelin, Outremer noblewoman and co-ruler (b. 1253)
- Guido della Torre, Italian nobleman and rebel leader (b. 1259)
- Malatesta da Verucchio, Italian nobleman and knight (b. 1212)
- Reginald le Chen, Scottish nobleman and high sheriff (b. 1235)
- Siemowit of Dobrzyń, Polish prince and knight (House of Piast)
- Valdemar IV, Danish nobleman and knight (House of Estridsen)
- Xenia of Tarusa, Russian noblewoman and princess (b. 1246)
- Zayn al-Din al-Amidi, Arab scholar, academic, jurist and writer
