= Beatrice, Countess of Montfort =

French noblewoman (1249–1312)

Beatrice de Montfort
- suo jure Countess of Montfort-l'Amaury; Countess of Dreux; Countess of Braine
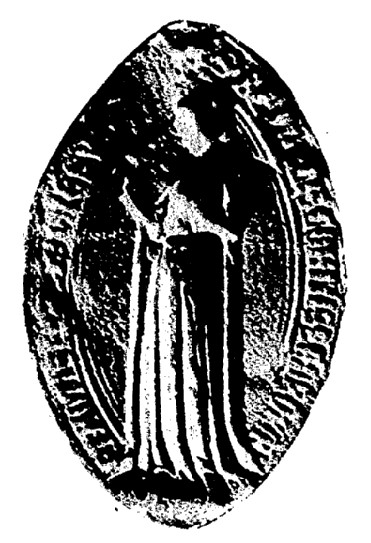
- Born: December 1248 – December 1249; France
- Died: 9 March 1312
- Noble family: House of Montfort
- Spouses: Robert IV, Count of Dreux, Braine and Montfort-l'Amaury
- Issue: Marie of Dreux; Yolande of Dreux, Queen of Scotland; John II, Count of Dreux and Braine; Jeanne of Dreux, Countess of Braine; Beatrice of Dreux, Abbess of Port-Royal; Robert of Dreux, Seigneur of Chateau-du-Loire
- Father: John I of Montfort
- Mother: Jeanne, Dame de Chateaudun

Coat of arms of the counts of Montfort-l'Amaury

Beatrice de Montfort, Countess of Montfort-l'Amaury (December 1249 – 9 March 1312) was a ruling sovereign countess of Montfort from 1249 until 1312. She was also countess of Dreux by marriage to Robert IV, Count of Dreux. She was the ancestor of the Dukes of Brittany from the House of Montfort-Dreux which derived its name from her title.

== Life ==
Beatrice was born sometime between December 1248 and 1249, the only child of John I of Montfort, Count of Dreux and Jeanne, Dame de Chateaudun.

=== Reign ===
In 1249, Beatrice's father died in Cyprus, while participating in the Seventh Crusade. Thus, Beatrice succeeded her father as ruling countess of Montfort at the age of about one year old.

In 1251, Jeanne married her second husband, John II of Brienne, Grand Butler of France. Jeanne and John had a daughter, Blanche de Brienne, Baroness Tingry (1252–1302); Blanche married William II de Fiennes, Baron of Tingry. Jeanne died sometime after 1252, leaving Beatrice and her half-sister Blanche as her co-heiresses.

Beatrice was married to Robert IV, Count of Dreux, Braine and Montfort-l'Amaury in 1260, when she was about eleven years old. He was the son of John I, Count of Dreux and Braine, and Marie de Bourbon. As was the custom for female rulers at this point in time, he became the co-ruler with Beatrice and Count of Montfort by right of his wife after their wedding.

=== Death ===
Beatrice died on 9 March 1312 at the age of around sixty-three. She was buried in the Abbaye de Haute-Bruyère.

== Issue ==
Beatrice and Robert had:

- Marie of Dreux (1261/62–1276), in 1275 married Mathieu de Montmorency
- Yolande de Dreux (1263–1323), Countess of Montfort, married, firstly, on 15 October 1285, King Alexander III of Scotland, and, secondly, in 1292, Arthur II, Duke of Brittany
- John II of Dreux (1265–1309)
- Joan of Dreux, Countess of Braine, married, firstly, Jean IV de Roucy, and, secondly, John of Bar
- Beatrice of Dreux, abbess of Port-Royal-des-Champs (1270–1328)
- Robert of Dreux, seigneur of Chateau-du-Loire.

== Ancestry ==
Ancestors of Beatrice, Countess of Montfort

Simon de Montfort
Simon de Montfort, 5th Earl of Leicester
Amicia de Beaumont
Amaury de Montfort
Bouchard III de Montmorency
Alix de Montmorency
Laurence of Hainault
John I of Montfort
Hugh III, Duke of Burgundy
André Guigues VI, Dauphin of Viennois
Beatrice of Albon, Countess of Albon and Dauphine of Viennois
Beatrice of Burgundy
Rainon I de Sabran
Beatrix de Sabran
Garsende de Forcalquier
Beatrice de Montfort
Hughes V, Viscount of Chateaudun
Geoffrey V, Viscount of Châteaudun
Jeanne de Preuilly
Geoffrey VI, Viscount of Châteaudun
Ursion II, Seigneur de Fréteval
Alix de Fréteval
Gracia, Dame de Faye
Jeanne, Dame de Chateaudun
Baudoin des Roches
William des Roches, Seneschal of Anjou
Alix de Châtellerault
Clémence des Roches
Robert IV of Sablé
Marguerite de Sablé
Clémence de Mayenne

== Sources ==
- de Boos, Emmanuel (2004). L'armorial le Breton (in French). Somogy editions d'art.
- Bubenicek, Michelle (2002). Quand les femmes gouvernent: droit et politique au XIVe siècle:Yolande de Flandre, Droit et politique au XIV siecle (in French). Ecole des Chartes.
- Connolly, Sharon Bennett (2017). Heroines of the Medieval World. Amberley Publishing.
- Newman, William Mendel (1935). Les seigneurs de Nesle en Picardie (XIIe-XIIIe siècle): leurs chartes et leur histoire (in French). Vol. 91, Part 2. American Philosophical Society.
- Pollock, M. A. (2015). Scotland, England and France After the Loss of Normandy, 1204-1296: "Auld Amitie". The Boydell Press.
- Richardson, Douglas (2004). Everingham, Kimball G.; Faris, David (eds.). Plantagenet Ancestry: A Study in Colonial and Medieval Families, Royal Ancestry series. Genealogical Publishing Co.

Beatrice, Countess of Montfort House of Dreux Born: 1248 Died: 1312
Regnal titles
| Preceded by John I | Countess of Montfort; 1249–1312 with Robert (1260–1282) | Succeeded by Yolande |
