= Edmund Mortimer (died 1331) =

English nobleman (1302/3–1331)

Sir Edmund Mortimer
- Born: 1302/1303
- Died: 16 December 1331
- Noble family: Mortimer
- Spouse: Elizabeth de Badlesmere (m. 1316)
- Issue: Roger Mortimer, 2nd Earl of March; John Mortimer
- Father: Roger Mortimer, 1st Earl of March
- Mother: Joan de Geneville, 2nd Baroness Geneville

Sir Edmund Mortimer (1302/1303 – 16 December 1331) was the eldest son of Roger Mortimer, 1st Earl of March, and Joan de Geneville, 2nd Baroness Geneville. By his wife Elizabeth de Badlesmere, he was the father of Roger Mortimer, 2nd Earl of March. Though Edmund survived his father by one year, he did not inherit his father's lands and titles, as they were forfeited to the Crown, and his son only reacquired them gradually.

== Family and early life ==
Edmund's father, Lord Roger, married the great heiress Joan de Geneville on 20 September 1301. Edmund and another sibling were born within three years of the marriage. Ian Mortimer places Edmund's birth in late 1302 or early 1303, with the earliest possible date being nine months after the wedding. As evidence, Mortimer writes that Edmund would probably have married at a similar age to his father, who was fourteen when he married Joan. The Wigmore Abbey Annals, however, did not record his birth, so it is possible that the boy was born nearer to 1305, after the birth of his eldest sister, Margaret.

=== Marriage and issue ===
In the spring of 1316 at Westminster, Bartholomew de Badlesmere, 1st Baron Badlesmere, negotiated an alliance with Roger, which took place at the same time that they undertook Edward II's order to attack the town of Bristol and seize eighty men who had been indicted. In mid-May, Roger and his household travelled to Wigmore to celebrate the marriage of his eldest son, fourteen-year-old Edmund, to the three-year-old Elizabeth de Badlesmere. With Bartholomew de Badlesmere agreeing to pay Roger the "substantial sum" of £2,000, the two were married at Kinlet, Shropshire, on 27 July 1316. Edmund and Elizabeth's eldest son, Roger, would be born at Ludlow Castle on 11 November 1328. A short-lived brother, John, soon followed.

During the time of Edmund's marriage, his father named him the heir to his mother Margaret's estates in Somerset and Buckinghamshire, which included Bridgwater Castle. During their father's later exile abroad, Edmund and his younger brother Roger were imprisoned at Windsor Castle, along with the sons of the Earl of Hereford. Edmund and his two brothers were moved to the more secure Tower of London on 1 October 1326. Once freed, a triumphant Roger had Edmund and his brothers wear earls' attire as they were knighted by the young king Edward III on 1 February 1327. Roger was made Earl of March in September 1328, and Edmund's eldest son Roger, was born eleven days later. The Earl of March was executed for treason by hanging in 1330, one year before the death of his son Edmund. Edmund did not inherit his father's lands and titles, as they were forfeited to the Crown.

Alison Weir cites Edward III's behaviour towards Edmund as evidence of the young king's sense of justice. In October 1331, Edmund was restored to the family lands at Wigmore as well as to other lordships. He died several months later from a fever, on 16 December 1331, and was survived by his three-year-old son, Roger. Four years later, Elizabeth remarried to William de Bohun, a close companion of Edward III and future Earl of Northampton. Edmund's son Roger was allowed to succeed as the 2nd Earl of March in 1354.

== Ancestry ==
Ancestors of Edmund Mortimer (died 1331)

Ralph de Mortimer
Roger Mortimer, 1st Baron Mortimer
Gladys the Dark
Edmund Mortimer, 2nd Baron Wigmore
William de Braose
Maud de Braose
Eva Marshal
Roger Mortimer, 1st Earl of March
Infelram de Fiennes
William de Fiennes
Isabelle Conde
Margaret de Fiennes
John II of Brienne, Grand Butler of France
Blanche de Brienne
Jeanne, Dame de Chateaudun
Edmund Mortimer
Simon de Joinville
Geoffrey de Geneville, 1st Baron Geneville
Beatrix d'Auxonne
Peter de Geneville
Gilbert de Lacy, of Ewyas Lacy
Maud de Lacy
Isabel Bigod
Joan de Geneville, 2nd Baroness Geneville
Hugh XI of Lusignan, Count of La Marche
Hugh XII, Count of La Marche
Yolande de Dreux, Countess of Penthièvre and of Porhoet
Joan of Lusignan
Raoul III, Sire de Fougères
Jeanne de Fougères
Isabelle de Craon
