= Edmund Mortimer =

Edmund Mortimer is the name of:

== Members of the Marcher family of Mortimer ==
- Edmund Mortimer, 2nd Baron Mortimer (1251–1304)
- Sir Edmund Mortimer (1302–1331) (1300s–1331)
- Edmund Mortimer, 3rd Earl of March (1351–1381), and his second son (1352–1381)
- Edmund Mortimer, son of the 3rd Earl (1376–1409)
- Edmund Mortimer, 5th Earl of March (1391–1425)

== Other ==
- Edmund Mortimer (actor) (1874–1944), American actor and film director
