= Roger Mortimer, 2nd Earl of March =

English nobleman and soldier (1328–1360)

Roger Mortimer
- Earl of March; Baron Mortimer of Wigmore
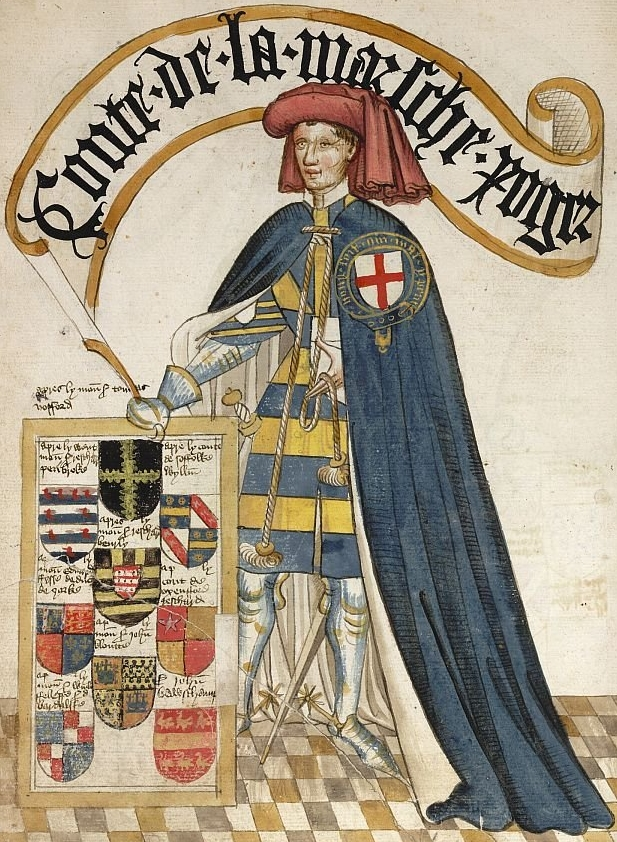
- Conte de la Marsche, Roger, illustration from the Bruges Garter Book, c.1450. He displays the arms of Mortimer on his tabard.
- Born: 11 November 1328; Ludlow Castle, Shropshire
- Died: 26 February 1360 (aged 31); Rouvray
- Buried: Wigmore Abbey
- Noble family: Mortimer
- Spouse: Philippa Montagu
- Issue: Roger Mortimer; Edmund Mortimer, 3rd Earl of March; Margery Mortimer; Janet Mortimer; Thomas Mortimer (illegitimate)
- Father: Sir Edmund Mortimer
- Mother: Elizabeth de Badlesmere

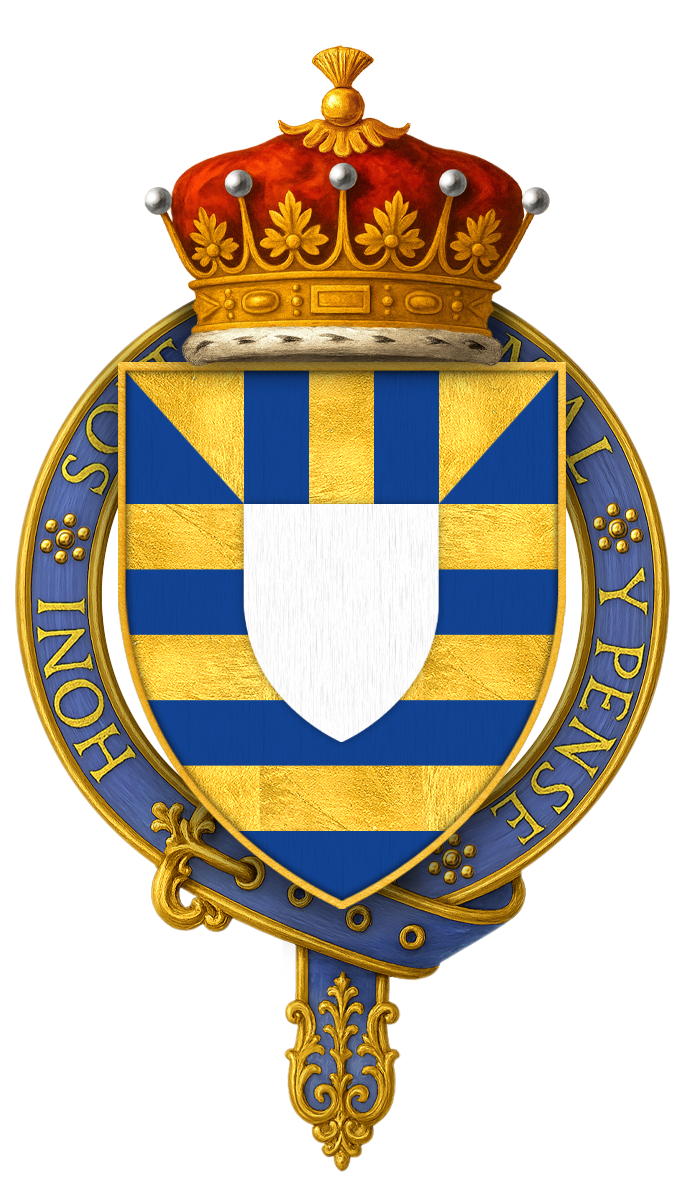
Arms of Sir Roger Mortimer, 2nd Earl of March, KG -- Barry or and azure, on a chief of the first two pallets between two base esquires of the second over all an inescutcheon argent

Roger de Mortimer, 2nd Earl of March, 4th Baron Mortimer of Wigmore, KG (11 November 1328 – 26 February 1360) was an English nobleman and military commander during the Hundred Years' War.

He was the son of Sir Edmund Mortimer (d. 1331) and Elizabeth de Badlesmere, and grandson of Roger Mortimer, 1st Earl of March.

== Inheritance ==
The Mortimer family lands and titles were lost after the first Earl of March's revolt and death by hanging in 1330, which was followed the next year by the death of Roger's father. Roger thus grew up with uncertain prospects, and re-acquired the family honours only gradually.

Around 1342, he received back Radnor, and the next year the old family baronial seat at Wigmore, Herefordshire.

== Military career ==
As a young man, he distinguished himself in the wars in France, fighting at Crécy and elsewhere in the campaign of 1347. Afterwards, he was given livery of the rest of his lands, was one of the knights admitted at the foundation of the Order of the Garter, and was summoned to parliament as a baron both in 1348. He was knighted on 12 July 1346 at La Hogue by Edward the Black Prince.

== Earldom ==
In 1354, the sentence passed against Mortimer's treacherous grandfather, the first earl, was reversed, and the next year he was summoned to parliament as Earl of March. Also in 1355, he received a number of important appointments, including Constable of Dover Castle and Warden of the Cinque Ports, and he accompanied an expedition of Edward III to France.

== Other honours ==
On 19 October 1356, his grandmother Joan de Geneville, 2nd Baroness Geneville, widow of the first earl, died, and Roger inherited her vast estates, including Ludlow Castle, which was thereafter the Mortimer family seat and power base.

In the following years, he became a member of the Royal Council and was appointed Constable at the castles of Montgomery, Bridgnorth in Shropshire, and Corfe in Dorset.

In 1359, and continuing into 1360, he was Constable of Edward III's invasion of France. He fought in the failed siege of Reims and captured Auxerre. The English forces then moved into Burgundy, where Roger died suddenly at Rouvray, near Avallon.

== Marriage and children ==
Roger married Philippa de Montagu (1332–1381), daughter of William Montagu, 1st Earl of Salisbury, and Catherine Grandison and had by her two sons:

- Roger Mortimer, who died young;
- Edmund Mortimer, 3rd Earl of March;

Mortimer also had at least one illegitimate child:

- Sir Thomas Mortimer, who acted as deputy for his nephew Roger Mortimer, 4th Earl of March, in Ireland (1382–1383) and stood trial for the slaying of Richard II's commander, Sir Thomas Molineux after the Battle of Radcot Bridge (1387).

== Arms ==
Heraldic Coat of Arms: Barry Or and azure, on a chief of the first three pallets between two gyronnies based on the second, over all an inescutcheon argent.

== Ancestry ==
Ancestors of Roger Mortimer, 2nd Earl of March

8. Edmund Mortimer, 2nd Baron Mortimer of Wigmore
4. Roger Mortimer, 1st Earl of March
9. Margaret Mortimer, Baroness Wigmore
2. Sir Edmund Mortimer
10. Sir Piers de Geneville
5. Joan de Geneville, 2nd Baroness Geneville
11. Jeanne of Lusignan
1. Roger Mortimer, 2nd Earl of March
12. Gunselm de Badlesmere
6. Bartholomew de Badlesmere, 1st Baron Badlesmere
13. Joan FitzBernard
3. Elizabeth de Badlesmere, Countess of Northampton
14. Thomas de Clare, Lord of Thomond
7. Margaret de Clare, Lady Badlesmere
15. Juliana FitzGerald, Lady of Thomond

== Footnotes ==
Roger Mortimer, 2nd Earl of March House of Mortimer Born: 11 November 1328 Died: 26 February 1360
Peerage of England
Preceded by Roger Mortimer (forfeit in 1330)	Earl of March (restored); 1355–1360	Succeeded by Edmund Mortimer
