= Blanche de Brienne, Baroness Tingry =

Blanche de Brienne
- Baroness Tingry suo jure Dame de La Loupelande
- Born: c. 1252; France
- Died: c. 1302
- Noble family: House of Brienne
- Spouses: William II de Fiennes, Baron of Tingry; William de la Planche
- Issue: Jean de Fiennes, Seigneur of Fiennes and Tingry; Joan de Fiennes; Margaret de Fiennes
- Father: Jean de Brienne, Grand Butler of France
- Mother: Jeanne, Dame de Chateaudun

Blanche de Brienne, Baroness Tingry (c. 1252 – c. 1302) was the wife of William II de Fiennes, Baron of Tingry (c. 1250 – 11 July 1302). She was also known as Dame de La Loupelande, and Blanche of Acre.

== Family ==
Blanche was born in about the year 1252 in France. She was the only child and heiress of Jean de Brienne, Grand Butler of France, and his first wife, Jeanne, Dame de Chateaudun, widow of Jean I de Montfort. Her paternal grandparents were John of Brienne, King of Jerusalem, Emperor of Constantinople, and Berenguela of Leon, and her maternal grandparents were Geoffrey VI, Viscount de Chateaudun and Clémence des Roches. Blanche had a uterine half-sister Beatrice de Montfort, Countess of Montfort-l'Amaury from her mother's first marriage to Jean I de Montfort (died 1249 in Cyprus). In 1260, Beatrice married Robert IV of Dreux, Count of Dreux, by whom she had six children.

Blanche was co-heiress to her mother, by which she inherited Loupeland in Maine.

== Marriage and issue ==
In the year 1269, Blanche married William II de Fiennes, Baron of Tingry and Fiennes, son of Enguerrand II de Fiennes and Isabelle de Conde. His other titles included Lord of Wendover, Buckinghamshire, of Lambourne, Essex, of Chokes and Gayton, Northamptonshire, of Martock, Somerset, of Carshalton and Clapham, Surrey, and custodian of the county of Ponthieu. The settlement for the marriage had been made in February 1266/67. William and Blanche had at least one son and two daughters:

- Jean de Fiennes, Seigneur of Fiennes and Tingry (b. before 1281 in France – 1340), in 1307 married Isabelle de Dampierre, daughter of Guy de Dampierre, Count of Flanders and Isabelle of Luxembourg. They had a son, Robert, who was Constable of France, and two daughters, Jeanne de Fiennes, who married Jean de Châtillon, Count of Saint-Pol, and Mahaut de Fiennes, who married Jean de Bournonville.
- Joan de Fiennes (d. before 26 October 1309), in 1291 married John Wake, 1st Baron Wake of Liddell. Had issue, including Margaret Wake, 3rd Baroness Wake of Liddell, mother of Joan of Kent and grandmother of Richard II of England.
- Margaret de Fiennes (b. after 1269 – 7 February 1333), in September 1285, married Edmund Mortimer, 2nd Baron Wigmore. They had eight children, including Roger Mortimer, 1st Earl of March.

She married William de la Planche (1240–1302) and had at least one son:

- James de la Planche (1265–1306)

In 1285, Blanche received the gift of twelve leafless oak stumps from Selwood Forest from King Edward I for her fuel.

Blanche de Brienne died on an unknown date around the year 1302. Her husband William was killed on 11 July 1302 at the Battle of Courtrai.

== Sources ==
- Parsons, John Carmi (1977). The Court and Household of Eleanor of Castile in 1290. Pontifical Institute of Mediaeval Studies.
