= War of the Breton Succession =

Part of the Hundred Years' War (1341 to 1365)

- Part of the Hundred Years' War
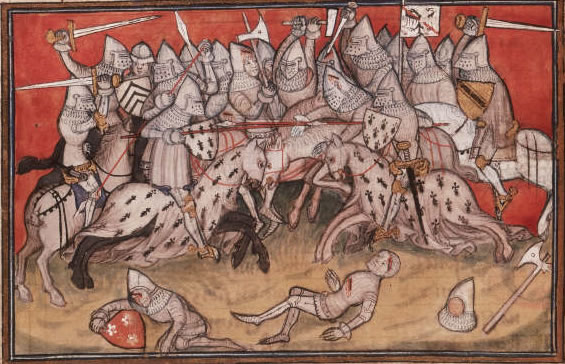
- Battle of Auray
Date	1341 – 12 April 1365
Location	Brittany
Result	Treaty of Guérande

Belligerents
House of Montfort-Brittany; Kingdom of England	House of Châtillon-Blois; Kingdom of France; Kingdom of Castile

Commanders and leaders
John of Montfort #; Joan of Flanders; John IV, Duke of Brittany; Thomas Dagworth †	Charles of Blois †; Joan of Penthièvre

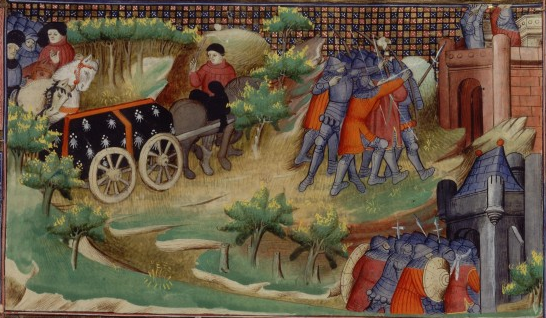
Funeral of John III, Duke of Brittany, depicted in the Chronicles of Jean Froissart

The War of the Breton Succession (Note: (French: guerre de Succession de Bretagne; Breton: Brezel hêrezh dugelezh Breizh)) or Breton Civil War was a conflict between the Counts of Blois and the Montforts of Brittany for control of the Duchy of Brittany. It was fought between 1341 and 12 April 1365. It is also known as the War of the Two Joans (French: guerre des deux Jeannes) due to the involvement of two rival duchesses of that name, Joan of Flanders and Joan of Penthièvre.

The war formed an integral part of the early Hundred Years' War due to the proxy involvement of the French and English monarchs in the conflict; the French supported the Blois (female heir) whilst the English backed the Montforts (male heir). The rival kings supported the duke of the principle opposite to their own claims to the French throne—the Plantagenets having claimed it by female succession, and the Valois by male succession. Montfort was ultimately successful following the Battle of Auray in 1364 but, in a surprising turn of events, the Montfortist duke pledged his loyalty to the king of France and not to the Plantagenet king of England who had supported him.

== Background ==
The Breton dukes had both a historical and ancestral connection to Britain and were also earls of Richmond in Yorkshire. Duke Arthur II of Dreux married twice, first to Mary of Limoges (1275–1291), then to Yolande of Dreux (1263–1322), countess of Montfort and widow of King Alexander III of Scotland. From his first marriage, he had three sons, including his heir John III and Guy, count of Penthièvre (d. 1331). From Yolande, Arthur had another son, also named John, who became Count of Montfort. (See Dukes of Brittany family tree.)

John III strongly disliked the children of his father's second marriage. He spent the first years of his reign attempting to have this marriage annulled and his half-siblings bastardized. When this failed, he tried to ensure that John of Montfort would never inherit the duchy. Since John III was childless, his heir of choice became Joan of Penthièvre, la Boiteuse, daughter of his younger brother Guy. In 1337 she married Charles of Blois, the second son of a powerful French noble house whose mother's brother was King Philip VI of France. But in 1340, John III reconciled himself with his half-brother, and made a will that appointed John of Montfort the heir of Brittany. On 30 April 1341, John III died.

== First stage of the war ==
Most of the nobility supported Charles of Blois, so if John of Montfort was to have any chance, it was dependent upon swift action before organized resistance could be made. John quickly took possession of the ducal capital Nantes and then seized the Ducal treasury at Limoges. By the middle of August, John of Montfort was in possession of most of the Duchy, the three principal cities of Nantes, Rennes and Vannes.

Up to this point, the succession crisis had been a purely internal affair. But to complicate things further, the Hundred Years' War between England and France had broken out four years earlier, in 1337. In 1341, there was a truce between the two countries, but there was little doubt that hostilities would be renewed when the truce ended in June 1342. Thus, when rumours reached Philip VI of France that John of Montfort had received English agents, the French Crown naturally took a more direct interest in their small neighbours situation. Charles of Blois became the official French candidate. Whatever had been his original intentions, John of Montfort was now forced to support through force, Edward III of England as King of France.

Edward III was bound by the truce not to take any offensive action in France. Nothing in it, however, impeded France from subduing rebellious vassals. In November, after a short siege and defeat at the Battle of Champtoceaux, John of Montfort was compelled to surrender at Nantes by the citizens. He was offered safe conduct to negotiate a settlement with Charles of Blois, but when this led nowhere he was thrown in prison.

It now fell upon John's wife, Joan of Flanders, to lead the Montfortist cause. Deeming her possessions in the east indefensible, she set up headquarters at Hennebont in western Brittany but was driven into Brest and besieged, the siege being broken by the arrival of an English army under the Earl of Northampton at the naval battle of Brest on 18 August 1342. Northampton then made his way inland and besieged Morlaix after an unsuccessful initial attack. The siege was lifted after the battle of Morlaix on 30 September. In Paris it was feared that Edward III would land at Calais once the truce ran out. The major part of the French army was therefore withdrawn, and Charles of Blois was left to pursue his claim on his own. Charles soon proved himself to be an able soldier: Rennes and Vannes were taken and many of the Montfortist captains defected.

In late November, Edward III arrived with his army at Brest. He almost at once marched against Vannes. The siege dragged on and a French army was assembled to meet him, but on 19 January 1343, before any major engagements could be fought, the two kings agreed the Truce of Malestroit. Vannes was taken into papal custody. With John of Montfort in prison, his son an infant, and his wife recently gone mad, the places under Montfortist control were in practice administered from London, with a large permanent English garrison at Brest.

The truce was to last until 29 September 1346 with the hopes that in the meantime the disputes between the two kingdoms could be permanently settled, but in Brittany it made little difference. The truce bound the two kings and their followers, but Charles of Blois claimed to be fighting his own separate war and was therefore not bound by any truce. The brutal small-scale fighting continued at the same pace.

In Paris, John of Montfort was released from prison on 1 September 1343 in return for a huge bond and a promise to stay on his estates in the east. The English coastal garrisons held firm, but the Montfortist party continued to crumble. They had some successes, such as the expulsion of the papal custodians from Vannes, but with no unifying leadership, mostly they were reduced to pleading for men and money from London.

To hamper communication between Brest and Vannes, Charles of Blois laid siege to Quimper in early March 1344. The city fell by assault on 1 May and, as usual at that time, this meant the slaughter of civilians in huge numbers, estimated between 1,400 and 2,000. The English prisoners were held for ransom, but the Breton and Norman captives were dispatched to Paris where they were executed for treason. During the summer and autumn, the Montfortist party fell apart. Even those who had been John of Montfort's staunchest allies now considered it futile to continue the struggle. It, therefore, mattered little that in March 1345 John finally managed to escape to England. With no adherents of note of his own, he was now little more than a figurehead for English ambitions in Brittany.

Edward III decided to repudiate the truce in summer 1345, a year before it was due to run out. As part of his larger strategy, a force was dispatched to Brittany under the joint leadership of the Earl of Northampton and John of Montfort. Within a week of their landing in June, the English had their first victory when Sir Thomas Dagworth, one of Northampton's lieutenants, raided central Brittany and defeated Charles of Blois at Cadoret near Josselin.

The follow-up was less impressive. Further operations were delayed until July when Montfort attempted the recapture of Quimper. However, news had reached the French government that Edward's main campaign had been cancelled and they were able to send reinforcements from Normandy. With his strengthened army, Charles of Blois broke the siege. Routed, Montfort fled back to Hennebont where he fell ill and died on 16 September. The heir to the Montfortist cause was his five-year-old son, John.

During the winter, Northampton fought a long and hard campaign with the apparent objective of seizing a harbour on the north side of the peninsula. Edward III had probably planned to land here with his main force during summer 1346. However, the English achieved very little for their efforts. Northern Brittany was Joan of Penthièvre's home region and resistance there was stiff.

In the end, Edward decided upon Normandy as the landing spot for his 1346 campaign. Northampton was recalled and Thomas Dagworth was appointed as deputy lieutenant. It was during a tour through the English strongholds on 9 June that Dagworth and his escort were trapped by Charles of Blois and his army near Saint-Pol-de-Léon. They dug in on a hilltop and fought off all attacks until nightfall when Charles was forced to retreat leaving many of his wounded behind.

== Tide turns against Charles ==
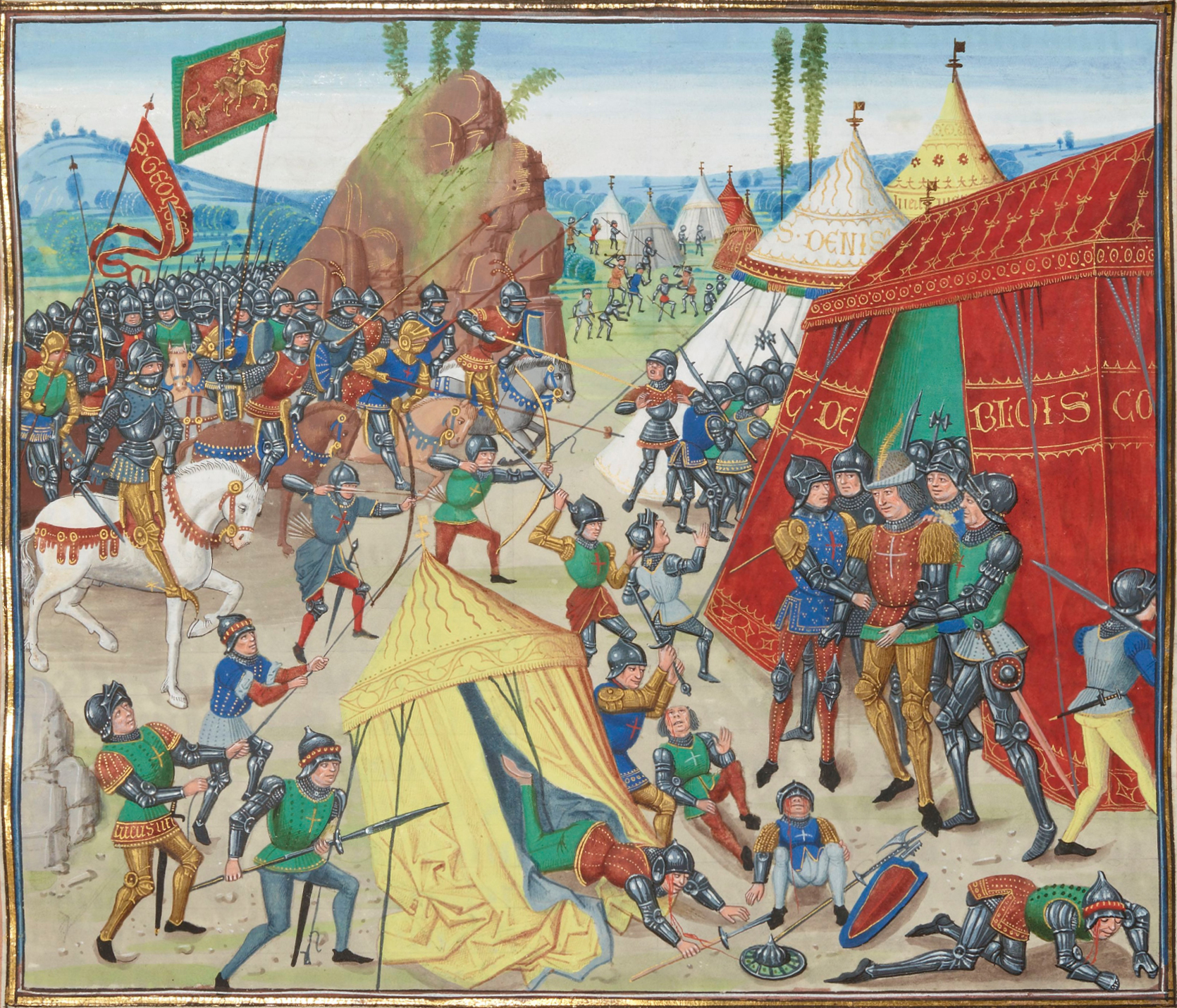
Capture of Charles of Blois

At this point events outside Brittany started to have an effect on the war. The French suffered a major defeat at the Battle of Crécy in 1346, and at Calais in 1347. Without French support, Charles of Blois gradually began to lose ground to the English captains. The memory of the massacre at Quimper increased his unpopularity, and Breton traders had an economic interest in strengthening links with England due to Brittany's strategic position between the Atlantic and English Channel. At the Battle of La Roche-Derrien in 1347, Charles was taken prisoner as he tried to recapture the town, which had just been taken by the English. He was jailed for five years in the Tower of London. The English now controlled Brest, Quimper, and Vannes.

Under pressure from Pope Innocent VI, the English, French, and Bretons negotiated a peace, while both factions maintained an uneasy balance of power within the duchy. It was during this period that the Combat of the Thirty took place, a famous episode in medieval chivalry. Conflicts between the French and English strongholds of Josselin and Ploërmel were resolved in a duel between thirty Montfortist knights led by Robert Bemborough, and thirty supporters of Charles de Blois led by Jean de Beaumanoir. The combat took place midway between the two towns on 26 March 1351. By nightfall the Anglo-Breton Montfortists had lost nine dead against six of the pro-French knights; the surviving Montfortists were forced to surrender. Though renowned at the time, and later highly romanticised, the combat had no effect on the outcome of the war.

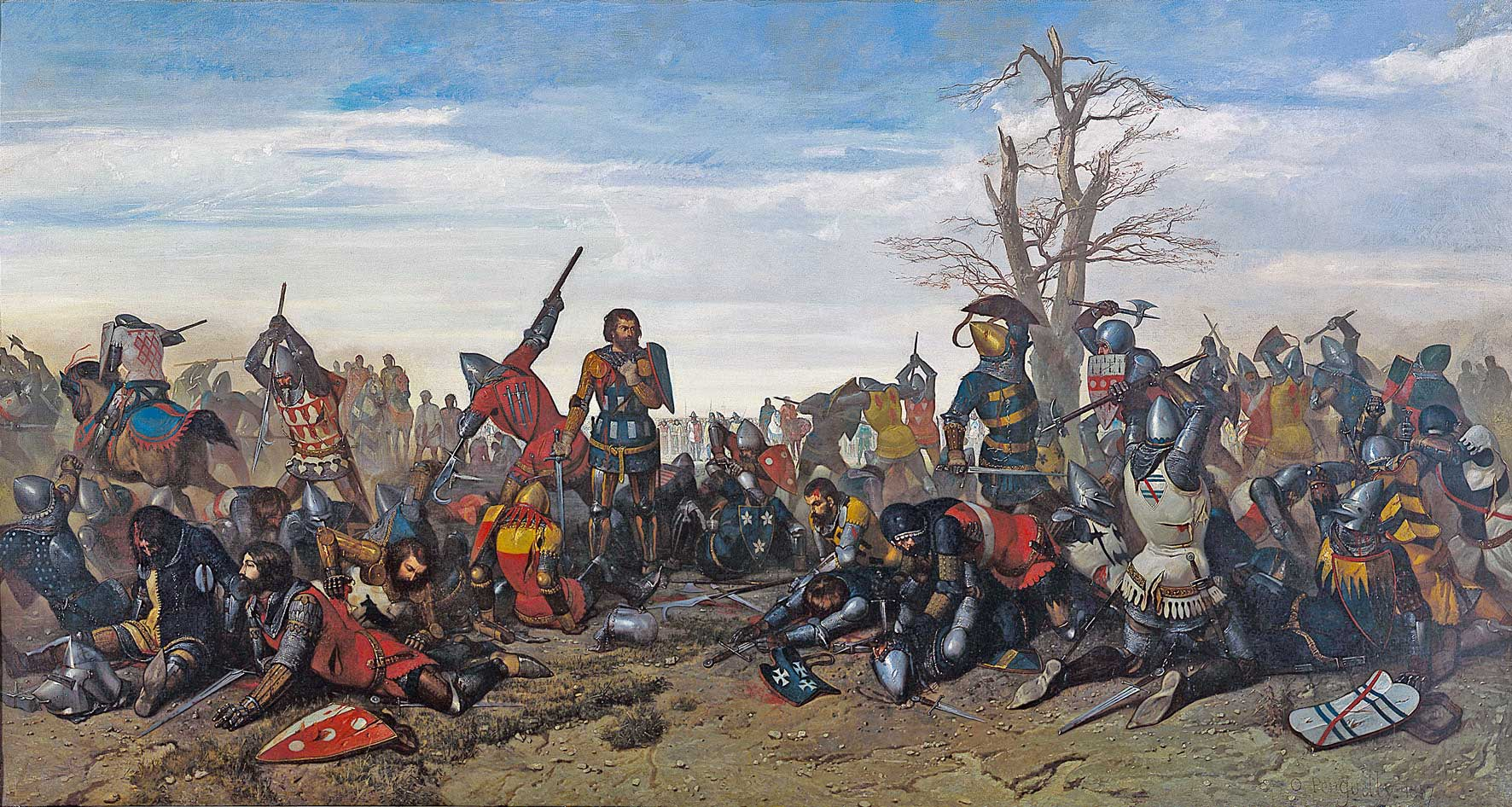
A 19th-century painting depicting The Combat of the Thirty (Octave Penguilly L'Haridon, 1857)

Edward III signed the Treaty of Westminster on 1 March 1353, accepting Charles of Blois as Duke of Brittany if the latter undertook to pay a ransom of 300,000 crowns, and that Brittany signed a treaty of alliance "in perpetuity" with England; this alliance was to be sealed by the marriage of the Montfortist claimant John of Montfort (son of the earlier John of Montfort) with Edward's daughter Mary. The marriage required the approval of the King of France and a papal dispensation. Charles de la Cerda, the Constable of France, negotiated the deal, but Charles II of Navarre, who needed to continue the war between England and France to maintain his own power, decided to intervene by assassinating the Constable. He then switched his support to France in exchange for territory. The treaty was negated, but Charles of Blois had been freed, and returned to Brittany as Duke.

== Final phase ==
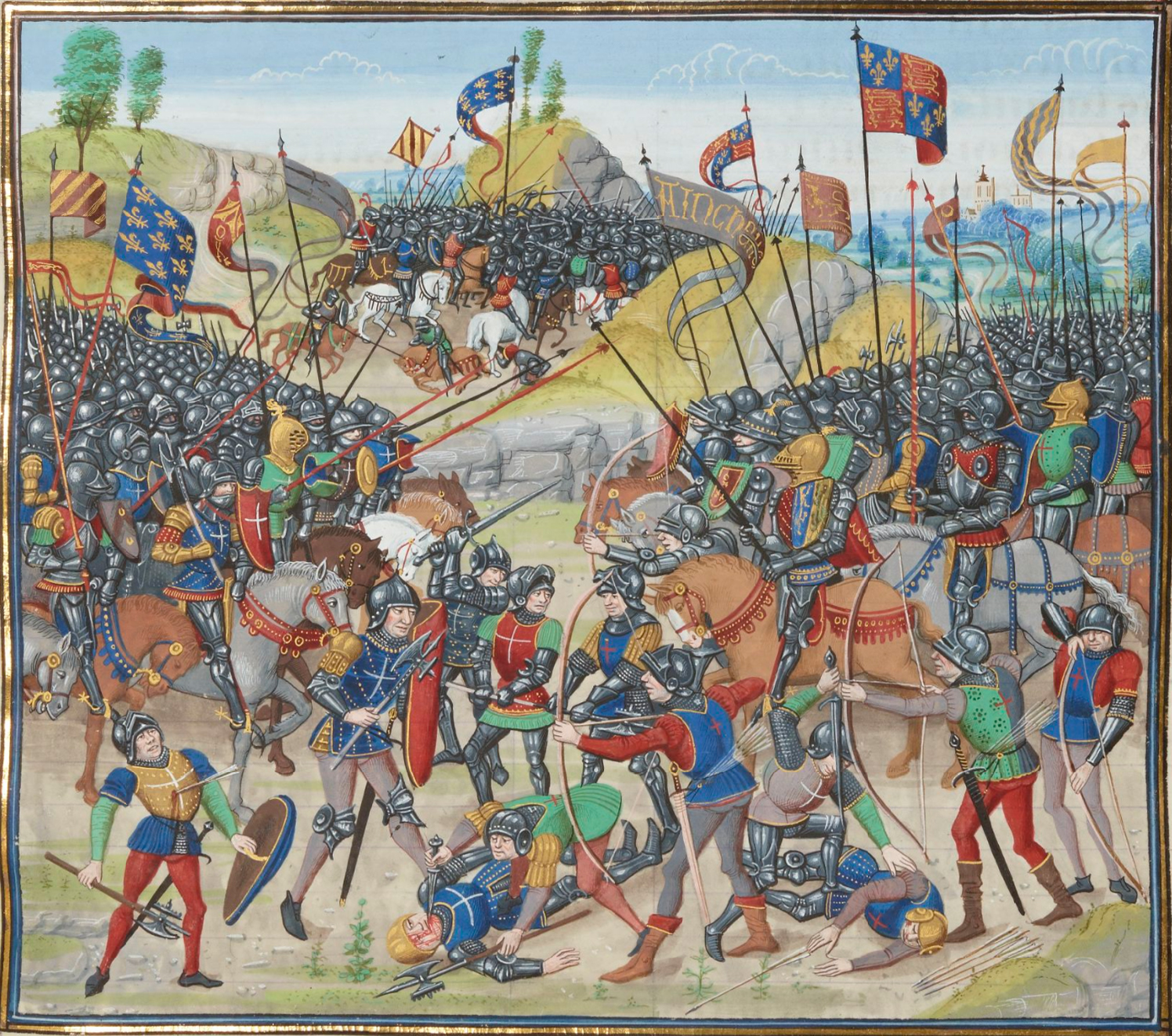
The Battle of Auray, 1364

The situation remained in stalemate for some time, with Charles of Blois as de facto Duke, but with significant territory still controled by the Montfortists. Outside events again began to have an effect on the conflict. A plague struck France and the King himself was captured by the English at the Battle of Poitiers in 1356. The French state was virtually paralysed. In 1362, when the younger John de Montfort reached 22 years of age, King Edward permitted him to return to Brittany. His return was conditioned by a covenant not to marry without permission, given in pledge of several fortresses. On arrival, John attempted to reach agreement with Charles of Blois to make peace and share Brittany, but Charles's wife Joan urged him to resist and crush John.

The war resumed in 1363 when Charles de Blois, assisted by Bertrand du Guesclin, had some successes, but when Bertrand left to take control of strongholds in Navarre and Normandy, Charles's advance halted at the unsuccessful siege of Bécherel. Another opportunity to negotiate an agreement arose, but again Joan blocked negotiations. John de Montfort moved to besiege Auray with renowned English warlord John Chandos. Charles of Blois and Bertrand du Guesclin came to the rescue of the besieged city, but they were decisively defeated at the Battle of Auray on 29 September 1364. This battle marked the end of this long conflict: Charles of Blois was killed and Joan of Penthièvre, finding herself a widow, saw her cause collapse. Du Guesclin was captured and ransomed by Charles V for 100,000 francs.

== Peace treaty ==
Peace was concluded on 12 April 1365 by the First Treaty of Guérande which established John of Montfort as Duke of Brittany. He did not reject completely the claims of the Penthièvre family, and established the following law of succession in Brittany:

- The Duchy would be transmitted from male to male in the family of Montfort.
- In the absence of male offspring, it would switch to males of the family of Penthièvre.
- Joan retained the prerogative of Penthièvre and the Viscouncy of Limoges.
- She would also receive 10,000 livres of annual rent taken from the French territories of the enemy.

King Charles V of France did not oppose the elevation of John, fearing that he might declare homage to Edward of England, his protector and former father-in-law (Mary having died in 1361). In addition, France was clearly depleted in the context of the Hundred Years' War. He therefore recognized John as Duke. By this action, he won the friendship of the Breton nobility. In December 1366, he received the oath of the new duke who surprisingly did not pledge allegiance to Edward, recognizing Charles as his sovereign instead.

The provisions of the treaty were later repudiated by the Montfortists when a later duke, John V, Duke of Brittany was kidnapped by the Penthièvres in 1420, in violation of the treaty. The Montfortists declared that the treaty had been broken, and as such were no longer required to accept its succession provisions. This became significant when Francis II, Duke of Brittany failed to produce a male heir, allowing the duchy to pass to his daughter Anne of Brittany in 1488.

== Chronology ==
- 30 April 1341: John III dies without heirs. Joan of Penthièvre and Charles of Blois became Duchess and Duke of Brittany. John of Montfort refuses to accept and calls for the help of King Edward III of England.
- 1343: John of Montfort is taken prisoner, but is released shortly afterwards. Charles tries to take advantage and attacks Hennebont, but the city is defended with success by Joan of Flanders, wife of Montfort. An English army relieves the siege and forces the Blois to a truce, broken shortly afterwards.
- 1344: Charles takes Quimper with the help of a French army, courtesy of King Philip VI of France, and slaughters 2000 civilians.
- 1345: John of Montfort fails to recover Quimper and dies. His ambitions over Brittany are inherited by his son John. His mother, Joan of Flanders, becomes the political and military commander of the Montfort faction.
- Between 1346 and 1364, several minor battles are won and lost by both parts, several truces are signed and broken. Joan of Flanders becomes mentally ill and is institutionalized in a convent.
  - 27 March 1351: Combat of the Thirty
- 29 September 1364: Battle of Auray. Bertrand du Guesclin and Charles of Blois are heavily defeated by John IV and the English warlord John Chandos. Charles is killed in action, ending the Blois pretensions in Brittany.
- 1365: John IV is recognized as Duke of Brittany and Joan of Penthièvre gives up any claim to the duchy in the Treaty of Guérande. Surprisingly, the new duke declares himself as a vassal, not to the English king who helped him, but to King Charles V of France.

== See also ==
- List of rulers of Brittany
- List of wars of succession in Europe
- War of the Two Pedros
