= Joan of Penthièvre =

Duchess of Brittany from 1341 to 1365

Joan
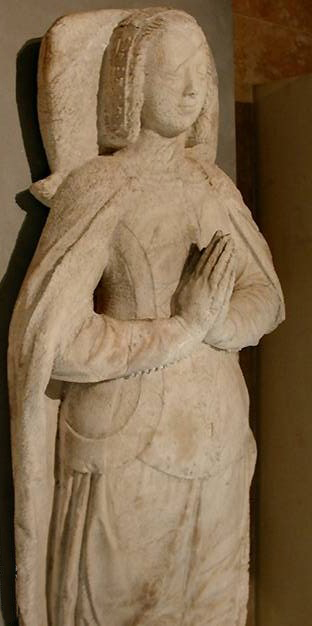
- Tomb effigy, now held at the Louvre Museum

Duchess of Brittany
- Reign: 1341–1365
- Predecessor: John III
- Successor: John IV
- Co-ruler: Charles
- Born: 1319
- Died: 10 September 1384 (aged 65); Guingamp
- Burial: church of the Friars Minor of Guingamp.
- Spouse: Charles of Blois-Châtillon
- Issue: John I, Count of Penthièvre; Guy; Henry; Marie, Lady of Guise; Marguerite, Countess of Angoulême
- House: Dreux
- Father: Guy de Penthièvre
- Mother: Jeanne d'Avaugour
- Religion: Roman Catholicism

Joan of Penthièvre (French: Jeanne; c. 1319 – 10 September 1384), sometimes called Joan the Lame, reigned as Duchess of Brittany together with her husband, Charles of Blois, between 1341 and 1364. Her ducal claims were contested by the House of Montfort, which prevailed only after an extensive civil war, the War of the Breton Succession. After the war, Joan remained titular Duchess of Brittany to her death. She was Countess of Penthièvre in her own right throughout her life.

== Early life ==
Joan was the only child of Guy of Penthièvre (brother of John III, Duke of Brittany) and Joan of Avaugour. Through her father she became Countess of Penthièvre in her own right and established her ducal claims.

== War of the Breton Succession ==
Joan was one of the protagonists of the War of the Breton Succession. The issue of succession to the ducal crown would involve the issue of whether a child could, regardless of gender, claim the right of "representation" of a deceased parent, and Joan would then inherit her father's rights as the second brother of the late Duke of Brittany, or the next eldest male heir in a partially-parallel lineage outranked all others. In the Breton succession, the collateral claimant was Joan's half-uncle John, Count of Montfort, born from the second marriage of Joan's grandfather Arthur II, Duke of Brittany to Yolande of Dreux, Queen of Scots. Joan's uncle John III had been alienated from Yolande, his stepmother, and sought to prevent his half-brother John from succeeding him, which included an abortive attempt to annul his father's second marriage and so render his half-siblings illegitimate. (Note: The issue of 'representative' versus 'cadet' inheritance was related also to the question of whether the ducal line of Brittany would adhere to French royal tradition (cadet succession) or its own local custom (representative).)

Coat of arms of Joan as Duchess of Brittany

In December 1335, negotiations were made for a marriage between Joan and John of Eltham, Earl of Cornwall, the brother of King Edward III of England; (Note: Edward III appointed "Willielmi d´Aubeneye militis et Joannis Caupegorge" as proxies to negotiate the marriage between "Joannem comitem Cornubiæ fratrem nostrum" and "Johannam filiam Guidonis de Britannia neptem et hæredem [Johanne Duce Britanniæ consanguineo nostro]" by a charter dated 31 December 1335.) however, it appears that the arrangements did not result in an official betrothal. In 1337, Joan was betrothed to Charles of Blois in Paris, and they were living together by 1338 or 1339. In 1341, on the death of John III, the couple assumed the rule of the Duchy of Brittany, Charles having been granted permission to perform homage by King Philip VI of France by the arrêt of Conflans on 7 September 1341. They appeared to be supported by most of the local nobility and administration. However, John of Montfort did not agree to let go of his own claim, and war ensued. (Note: The reverberating theme in the history of Brittany has been its strong preference for independence. See, for example, the expression of that theme in the life of Francis II, Duke of Brittany.) Ironically, while the initial argument of the Montfortist cause actually relied very strongly on the idea that Brittany should follow French successorial practice, subsequent generations the line would vigorously enforce the notion that the Duchy of Brittany should remain independent from its royal neighbour.

When Joan's half-uncle John died in 1345 during the succession war, his wife, Joanna of Flanders, took arms to protect the rights of their son John IV the Conqueror from the party led by Joan and her husband, Charles. Joanna organized resistance and used diplomatic means to protect her family's position. (Note: Supposedly, in the Siege of Hennebont, an isolated account states that she took up arms and, dressed in armour, conducted the defence of the town. In that version, Joanna even led a raid of knights outside the walls that successfully set fire to and destroyed one of the enemy's rear camps. She then popularly became known as "Jeanne la Flamme". However, Joanna was eventually forced to retreat to England, where she became mentally ill, which her young son in the care of the English court. Joan and Charles now controlled most of the Duchy of Brittany.)

After those initial successes, Joan's husband, Charles of Blois, was taken prisoner by the English in 1347. Thomas Dagworth was the official captor of her husband. Charles was released nine years afterwards for a ransom of about half a million écus and resumed the war against the Montforts. Charles died in the Battle of Auray, which determined the end of the war and the victory of the Montforts, leaving Joan a widow. (Note: His supporters led a movement to canonise him as a saint for his devotion to religion, but despite the apparent support of Pope Gregory XI, no final canonisation was achieved. He was eventually beatified in 1904.)

== Later life ==
The contest between the two claimants was then settled in 1365 by the First Treaty of Guérande, whose terms had Joan receive a substantial pension (payments of which continued until 1372) in compensation for her claims, the right to maintain the ducal title for life and all her family lands of Penthièvre and Avaugour and an exemption from homage to the new duke for those territories. Most critically for future events, her male heirs would recover the duchy if John IV had no male posterity, and women were now formally prohibited from inheriting the duchy.

In 1379, when John IV had been forced into exile in England, King Charles V of France attempted to annex Brittany to the French royal domain. Joan was shocked by the violation of her sons' rights, as laid out in the Treaty of Guérande. Both her supporters and those of the Montfort line united to invite John IV back from his exile in England and retake control of the duchy.

After the death of Charles V, she ratified on 2 May 1381 the Second Treaty of Guérande, which essentially reinstated the terms of the First Treaty. From the legal perspective of the Treaties of Guérande, the issue of succession to the ducal crown appeared settled, but Joan's descendants provoked various conflicts with John IV and future dukes from the House of Montfort.

== Succession ==
Joan died on 10 September 1384 and was buried at the church of the Friars Minor of Guingamp.

Joan had lost the ducal title and powers of Brittany for her descendants, and despite attempts to reclaim the ducal crown the loss was permanent. However, her descendants were appointed from time to time to high administrative posts in Brittany under the future Kings of France. Her title and rights as Countess of Penthièvre were inherited, only to be lost from time to time to the Duke of Brittany, as her descendants continued their conflicts with the House of Montfort.

== Children ==
Joan and Charles had the following children:

- Marguerite, married in 1351 Charles de la Cerda (d. 1354)
- Marie (c.1340–1404), Lady of Guise, married in 1360 Louis I, Duke of Anjou
- John I, Count of Penthièvre (1345–1404) - also known as John of Blois
- Guy (d. 1385)
- Henry (d. 1400)
- Charles (d. before 1364)

== Sources ==
- Graham-Goering, Erika (2020). Princely Power in Late Medieval France: Jeanne de Penthièvre and the War for Brittany. Cambridge. ISBN 9781108489096.
- Jones, Michael, ed. (1972). Some Documents Relating to the Disputed Succession of the Duchy of Brittany, 1341. Royal Historical Society.
- Jones, Michael C.E. (1995). "Jean IV, Duke of Brittany". In Kibler, William W.; Zinn, Grover A. (eds.). Medieval France: An Encyclopedia. Garland Publishing. ISBN 978-0824044442.
- Rogers, Clifford J. (2005). "Sir Thomas Dagworth in Brittany, 1346-1347: Restellou and La Roche Derrien". In DeVries, Kelly; Rogers, Clifford J. (eds.). The Journal of Medieval Military History. Vol. III. The Boydell Press.
- Sumption, Jonathan (1990). The Hundred Years War:Trial by Battle. Vol. I. Faber & Faber.
- Wilkinson, Louise (2000). "Pawn and Political Player: Observations on the Life of a Thirteenth-Century Countess" (PDF). Historical Research. 73 (181): 105–123. doi:10.1111/1468-2281.00098. 108

== See also ==
- Dukes of Brittany family tree

Joan of Penthièvre House of Dreux Born: 1324 Died: 1384
Regnal titles
Preceded by John III	Duchess of Brittany; 1341–1364 with Charles I as co-duke John of Montfort and John IV as rivals	Succeeded by John IV as undisputed duke
Preceded by John III	Viscountess of Limoges; 1341–1384 with Charles I	Succeeded by John I
Preceded by Guy	Countess of Penthièvre; 1331–1384 with Charles I	Succeeded by John I
