= Jeanne, Dame de Chateaudun =

French noble

Jeanne de Chateaudun
- Dame de Chateaudun
- Born: c. 1227; France
- Died: After 1252
- Noble family: House of Châteaudun
- Spouses: Jean I de Montfort; John II of Brienne, Grand Butler of France
- Issue: Beatrice de Montfort, Countess of Montfort-l'Amaury; Blanche de Brienne, Baroness Tingry
- Father: Geoffrey VI, Viscount of Châteaudun
- Mother: Clémence des Roches

Jeanne, Dame de Chateaudun (c. 1227 – after 1252) was a French heiress and the wife of two French noblemen: Jean I de Montfort and John II of Brienne, Grand Butler of France.

== Family ==
Jeanne was born in France in about the year 1227, the eldest daughter and co-heiress of Geoffrey VI, Viscount of Châteaudun, and his wife Clémence des Roches (died after September 1259). Her father also held the titles of seigneur of Chateaudun, Chateau-du-Loir, Mayet, Loupeland, Montdoubleau, and la Suze. In 1229, he participated in the Crusade against the Albigenses in the Languedoc.

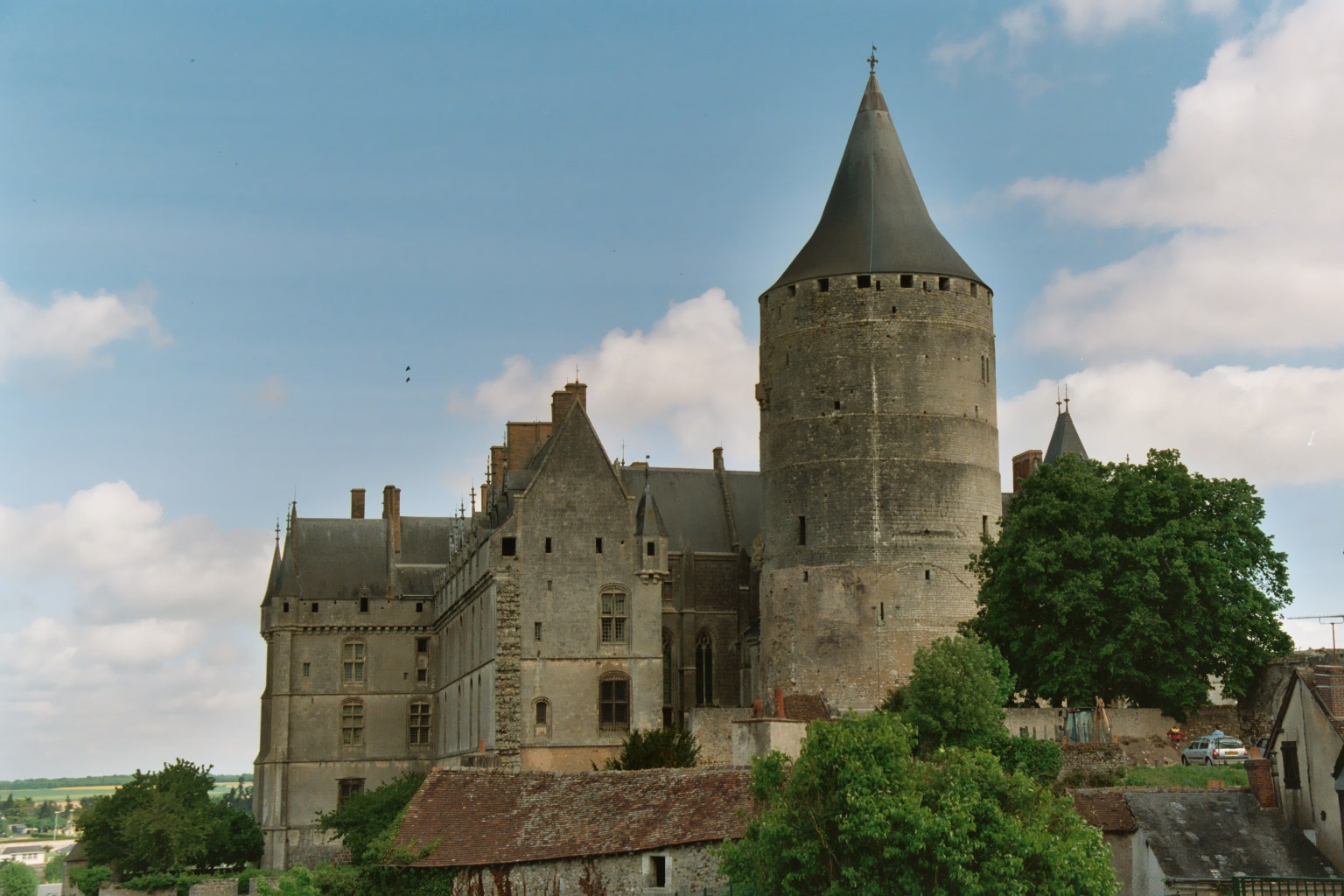
Chateau of Chateaudun, Eure-et-Loir

Her paternal grandparents were Geoffrey V, Viscount de Chateaudun and Alix de Freteval, and her maternal grandparents were William des Roches, Seneschal of Anjou, and Marguerite de Sablé, daughter of Robert de Sablé and Clémence de Mayenne. Jeanne had a younger sister Clémence de Chateaudun (after 1227 – before 1 February 1259), who married Robert de Dreux, Viscount de Chateaudun (1217–1264). She had a brother, Pierre de Chateaudun (died after 1251), who was a monk.

== Marriages and issue ==
In March 1248 Jeanne married her first husband Jean I de Montfort, son of Amaury VI, Count of Montfort and Beatrice of Burgundy, by whom she had one daughter:

- Beatrice de Montfort, Countess of Montfort-l'Amaury (c. December 1248/1249 – 9 March 1312), in 1260 married Robert IV of Dreux, Count of Dreux (1241–1282), they were the parents of six children, including John II, Count of Dreux and Yolande de Dreux, queen consort of Alexander III of Scotland.

In the year 1249, de Montfort died in Cyprus, while participating in the Seventh Crusade. Jeanne married her second husband John II of Brienne (1230–1296), Grand Butler of France, in 1251. She was his first wife. John II of Brienne was the son of John of Brienne, King of Jerusalem, Emperor of Constantinople, and his third wife Berenguela of Leon. A daughter was born to John II of Brienne and Jeanne:

- Blanche de Brienne, Baroness Tingry (c. 1252 – c. 1302). In 1269, married William II de Fiennes, Baron of Tingry. They had at least three children, including Margaret de Fiennes, mother of Roger Mortimer, 1st Earl of March

== Legacy ==
Jeanne died on an unknown date. There is a source which claims that she attained the title of Dame de Chateau-du-Loir in 1265. The title of Loupeland she passed on to her daughter Blanche.

Her husband John II of Brienne subsequently married Marie de Coucy (c. 1218 – 1285), widow of King Alexander II of Scotland.

== Sources ==
- Perry, Guy (2018). The Briennes: The Rise and Fall of a Champenois Dynasty in the Age of the Crusades, C. 950–1356. Cambridge University Press.
- Douglas Richardson, Kimball G. Everingham, and David Faris, "Plantagenet Ancestry: A Study in Colonial and Medieval Families, Royal Ancestry series", p. 155, Genealogical Publishing Co., Baltimore, Md., 2004
