= House of Montfort-Brittany =

Breton-French royal house

Montfort of Brittany
- Arms of the house of Montfort-Brittany, Dukes of Brittany.
- Parent house: House of Dreux; House of Montfort (maternal)
- Country: France
- Founded: 1322; 704 years ago
- Founder: John of Montfort
- Final ruler: Anne of Brittany
- Titles: Duke of Brittany; Count of Montfort; Earl of Richmond
- Estate: Brittany
- Dissolution: 1514; 512 years ago

The House of Montfort-Brittany was a Breton-French noble family, which reigned in the Duchy of Brittany from 1365 to 1514. It was a cadet branch of the House of Dreux; it was thus ultimately part of the Capetian dynasty. It should not be confused with the older House of Montfort which ruled as Counts of Montfort.

It succeeded the Brittany branch of the House of Dreux, invoking already in 1341 a right to succeed John III, Duke of Brittany. A war ensued, ultimately won by Montforts in 1364.

The dynasty was succeeded by the House of Valois, first Claude, the daughter of Montfortine duchess Anne, and then Claude's sons. Already from the time of Duchess Anne's marriage, however, the duchy was gradually subsumed to the French state, in practice, so it can be said that French central government succeeded the Montforts.

== Rise to power ==
Arms of John of Montfort

Count John of Montfort (1365 - 1421) was the sole surviving son of Yolande of Dreux, Countess of Montfort suo jure (and dowager queen of Scotland) from her second marriage to Arthur II, Duke of Brittany. John inherited in 1322 Montfort-l'Amaury from his mother. However, he was only a younger son of the Duke, who had several older sons from his first marriage. John only received some appanage in Brittany, and his maternal inheritance, a countship, was a much more important possession.

However, his eldest half-brother, John III, Duke of Brittany, was childless in spite of his three marriages. Duke John III died in 1341, and his duchy's nobles proclaimed Countess Joan of Dreux reigning duchess. She was the daughter of the late Guy, Count of Penthièvre, Duke John III's younger full brother, and thus John III's full niece.

John of Montfort however invoked both the principle of Salic law (allowing only males to succeed) and the principle of proximity of blood (as used earlier, e.g. by John of England against Arthur I of Brittany), having himself proclaimed Duke. This led to the Breton War of Succession, a part of the Hundred Years' War. His patron in this quest was king Edward III of England. The rivals, Duchess Joanna and her husband Charles of Blois were supported by the Valois kings of France. John of Montfort died without accomplishing his objective of becoming sole ruler of Brittany, but his wife Joanna of Flanders continued the fight in the name of their son John IV, Duke of Brittany (1339/40–99) who ultimately got the upper hand in the strife.

In the midst of the conflict, in 1352, the Estates of Brittany (États de Bretagne) were established. They would develop into the Duchy's parlement.

== Ruling as dukes ==
When the peace was sealed in 1365, it was stipulated that the Montfort branch would succeed in Brittany subject to the restrictions of Salic law and in the case of their male line going extinct, the heirs of Joanna of Penthièvre will succeed the last male Montfortist duke. The Breton ducal house and many Breton noble families had followed a semi-Salic tradition which permitted a daughter to inherit from her father. The Blois-Penthièvre family received more estates in Brittany as partial compensation.

Brittany retained its autonomy, or rather independence, although continuously giving lip service to French sovereignty. After the Breton War of Succession, Brittany still had links with the English through the Earldom of Richmond, until the Wars of the Roses.

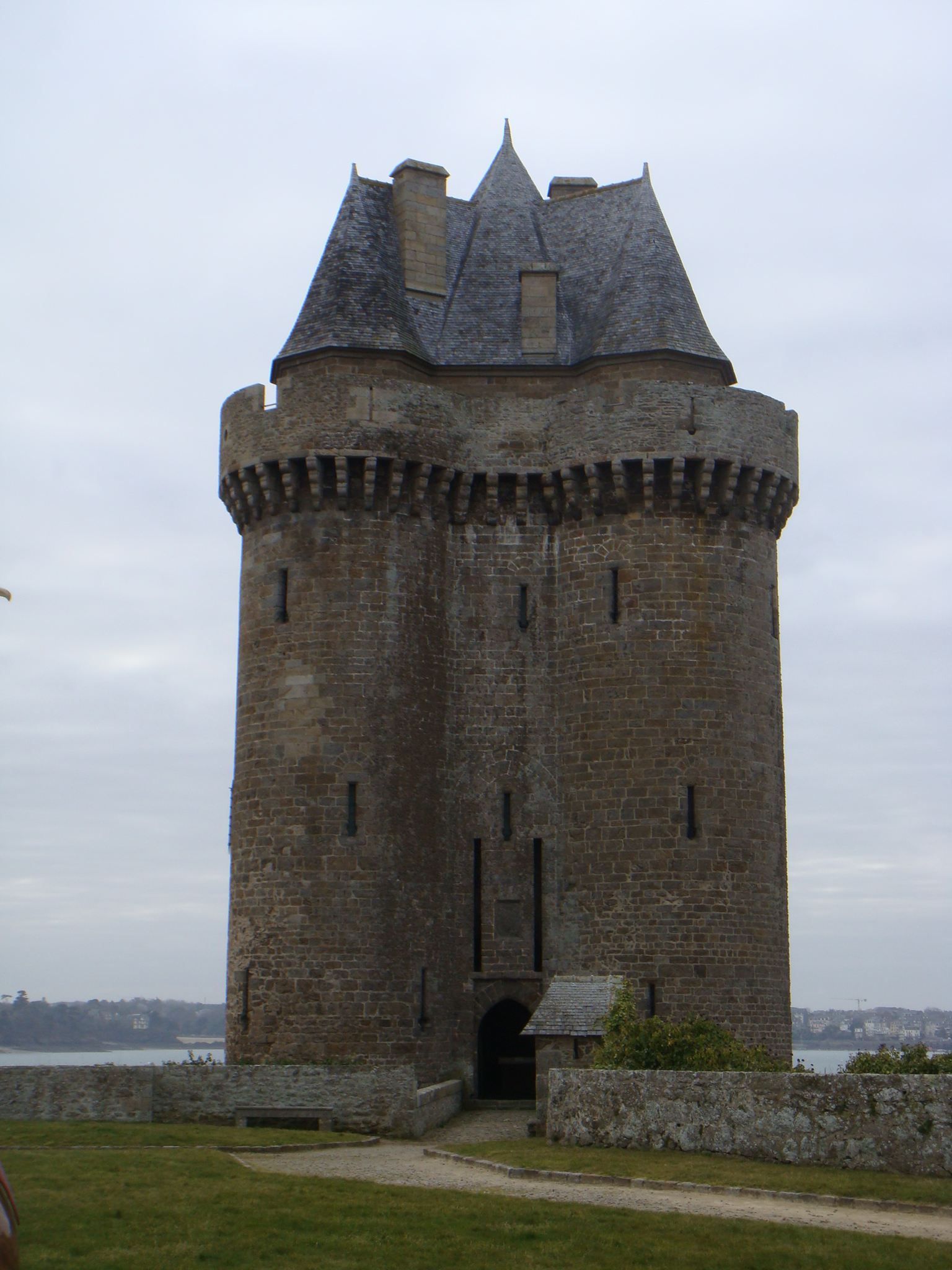
The Solidor Tower in the estuary of the river Rance in Brittany was built between 1369 and 1382 by John V, Duke of Brittany to the Rance at a time when the city of Saint-Malo did not recognize his authority.

John IV, Duke of Brittany was deserted by his nobles in 1373 and left for exile in England. Louis I, Duke of Anjou, brother of Charles V of France, and a son-in-law of the deposed Penthièvre Duchess Joanna, was appointed lieutenant-general of Brittany by the king, who in 1378 sought to annex Brittany to France, which provoked the Bretons to recall John IV from exile.

The second Treaty of Guérande (1381) established Brittany's neutrality in the Anglo-French conflict, although John continued to make homage to King of France.

In 1420, John V, Duke of Brittany was kidnapped by Olivier de Blois, count of Penthièvre, son of Joanna of Penthièvre. John's wife, Joan of France besieged the rebels and set free her husband, who confiscated the Penthièvre's goods.

According to the succession order enacted, in 1457 Duke Peter II was succeeded by his elderly uncle Arthur de Richemont instead of his sister Isabelle de Bretagne-Montfort (who married into the Laval family and from whom the future Chabot branch of the Rohan family descends).

In 1465, Francis II took the county of Penthièvre from its heiress, Nicole de Bretagne-Blois, thus again undermining the rival family's position in Brittany.

However, the last male Montfort, Francis II, Duke of Brittany (died in 1488) prepared for succession by his daughter Anne of Brittany – thus, the first female Montfort rulership abrogated the rights of genealogically more senior Penthièvre family (Catholics) as well as those of Rohan family (future Huguenots) but was consistent with the traditions of semi-Salic Brittany and had the support of the Breton nobles in the Estates of Brittany.

In the last years of Francis II, war with France continued and he was defeated in 1488. This last duke of independent Brittany was forced to submit to a treaty giving the King of France the right to determine the marriage of the Duke's daughter, Anne, a young girl 12 years old, and now the sole heir to the Duchy based on a de facto return to the Duchy's semi-Salic traditions.

== Ruled by the King of France ==
The independence of Brittany waned under the French dominion. Anne was forced to marry Charles VIII of France, but their children did not survive. When Charles died, Anne remained unwed for a time during which she returned to Brittany and attempted to restore her independent rule there as Duchess suo jure. The French Crown again acted to preserve its control over Brittany and Anne had to marry Charles VIII's distant cousin and successor, Louis XII of France. Their daughter Claude married the next French king preserving the union of the Duchy in the crown. Their son was the first to unite the Kingdom of France and the Duchy of Brittany into a single person; he attempted to preserve Brittany as a separately ruled sovereignty in a manner similar to the relationship between the crown of England and the Duchy of Cornwall, but his plans did not achieve fruition. This marked the complete union of Brittany to France.

== End of dynasty ==
Jean de Brosse (died 1502), grandson of Nicole de Blois the aforementioned, asserted their claim to the duchy when the last male duke Francis II died. Previous Montfortine rulers of Brittany had however by confiscations and exilings much weakened the Penthièvre family's resources in the duchy and Anne succeeded her father in the administration which wanted to protect Brittany's position to external predators.

Anne died in 1514, leaving the duchy to her elder daughter Claude (died 1524), but it was under the tactical dominion of Anne's widower king Louis (Claude's father, died 1515), and afterwards Claude's husband king Francis. The Montfort family continued only in female line, as nominally and titularly first Claude and then her sons François, Dauphin of France and after him the future Henry II of France were proclaimed Dukes of Brittany.

Claude's widower Francis I of France incorporated the duchy into the Kingdom of France in 1532 through the Edict of Union between Brittany and France, which was registered with the Estates of Brittany.

== See also ==
- Montfort-l'Amaury
