= Rouvray, Yonne =

Rouvray
- Commune
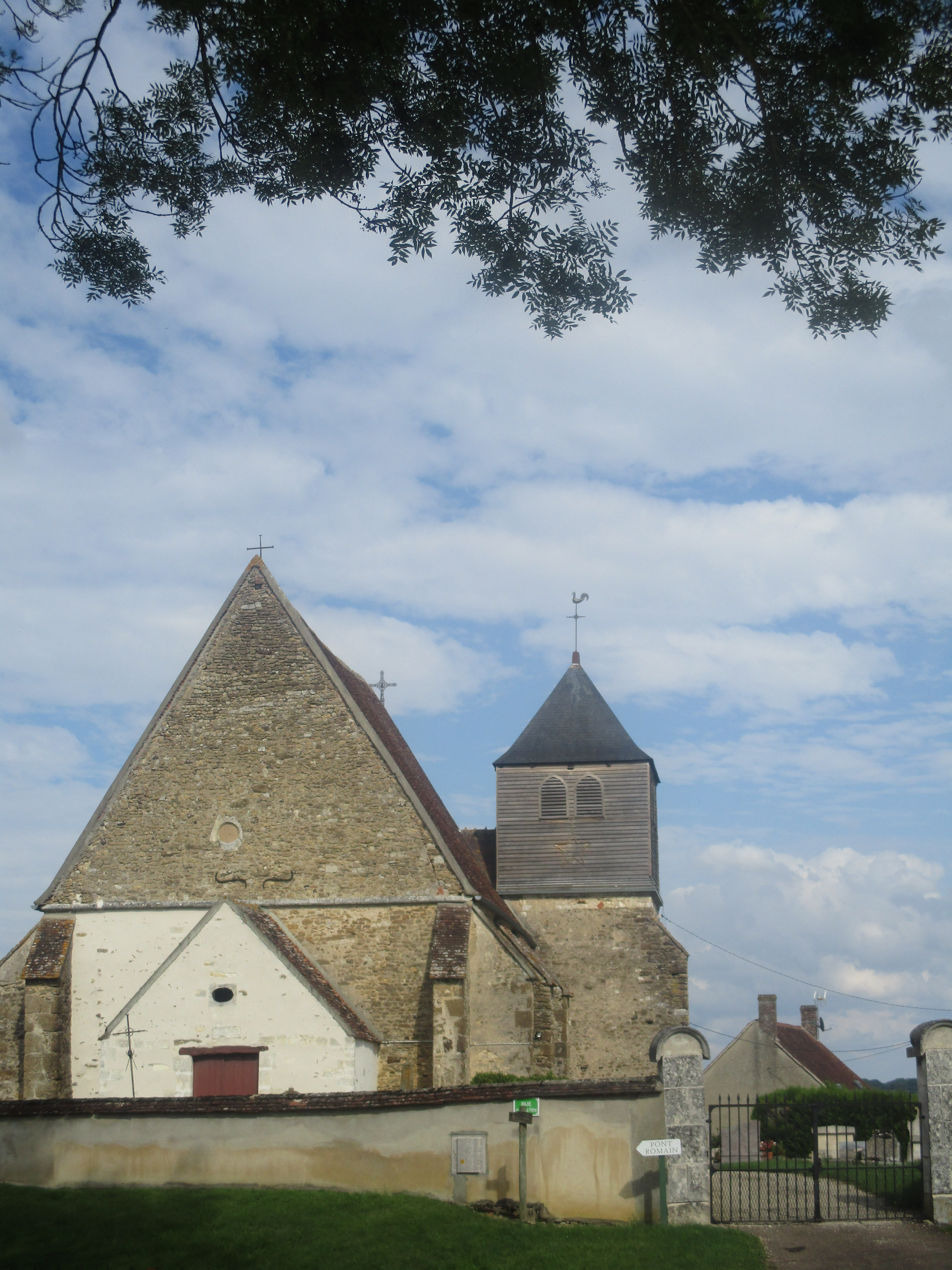
- The church in Rouvray

- Coat of arms
- Location of Rouvray
- Location within France Location within Bourgogne-Franche-Comté
- Coordinates: 47°53′54″N 3°40′09″E
- Country: France
- Region: Bourgogne-Franche-Comté
- Department: Yonne
- Arrondissement: Auxerre
- Canton: Chablis

Government
  - Mayor (2020–2026): Charles Berthollet
- Area^{1}: 7.59 km^{2} (2.93 sq mi)
- Highest elevation: 162 m (531 ft)
- Lowest elevation: 101 m (331 ft)
- Population (2023): 368
  - Density: 48.5/km^{2} (126/sq mi)
- Time zone: UTC+01:00 (CET)
  - Summer (DST): UTC+02:00 (CEST)
- INSEE/Postal code: 89328 /89230
- ^{1} French Land Register data, which excludes lakes, ponds, glaciers > 1 km^{2} (0.386 sq mi or 247 acres) and river estuaries.

Rouvray (French pronunciation: [ʁuvʁɛ]) is a commune in the Yonne department in Bourgogne-Franche-Comté in north-central France.

Roger Mortimer, 2nd Earl of March died at Rouvray in 1360.

== See also ==
- Communes of the Yonne department
