= John of Montfort =

Duke of Brittany (1295–1345)

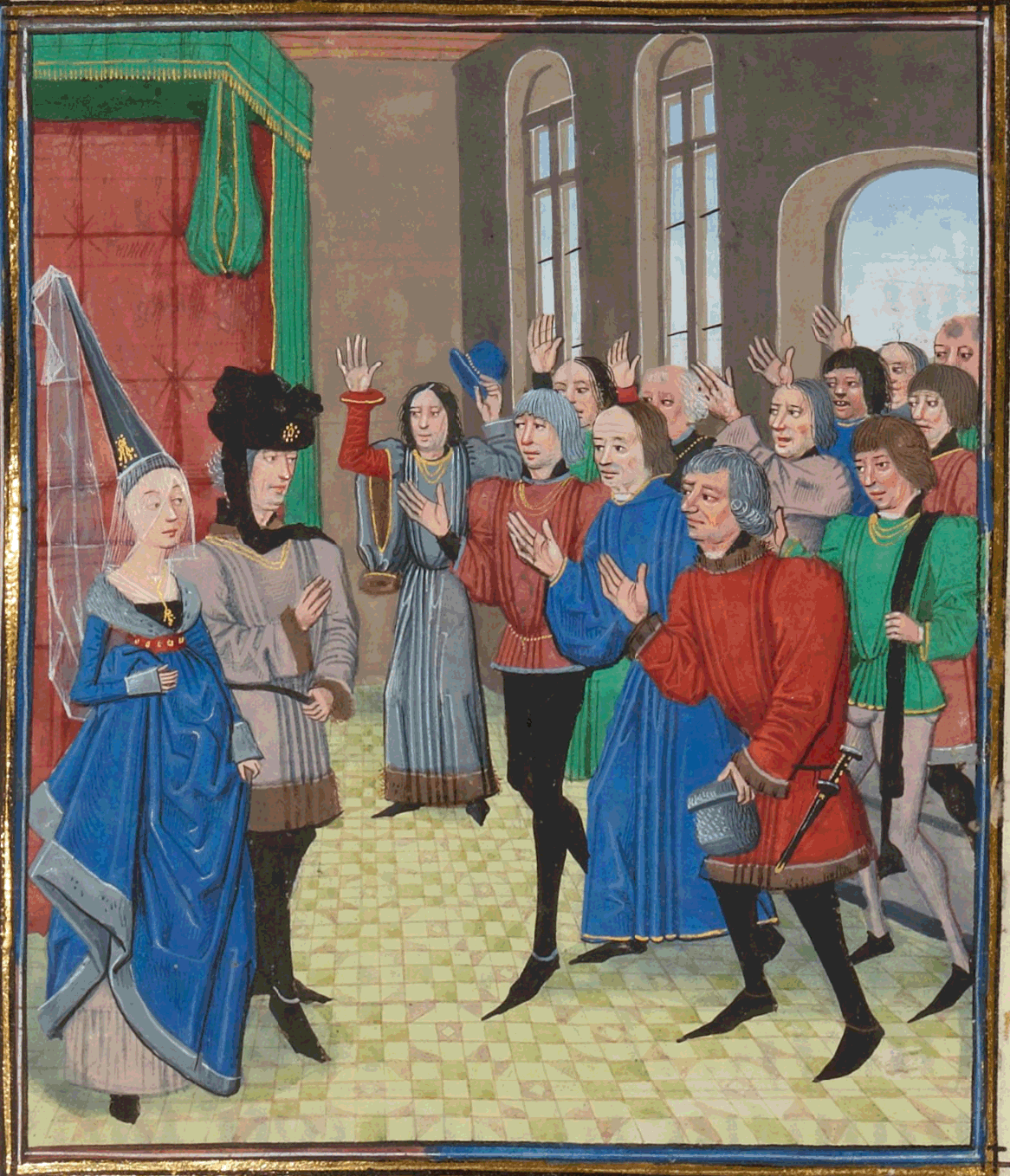
- Citizens of Nantes paying homage to John in a 15th-century illustration

Duke of Brittany
- Reign: 1341–1345
- Predecessor: John III
- Successor: John IV
- Born: 1295; Hennebont
- Died: 26 September 1345 (aged 49–50); Hennebont
- Spouse: Joanna of Flanders
- Issue: John IV, Duke of Brittany; Joan, Baroness of Drayton
- House: Dreux
- Father: Arthur II, Duke of Brittany
- Mother: Yolande de Dreux

John of Montfort (Middle Breton: Yann Moñforzh, French: Jean de Montfort) (1295 – 26 September 1345), sometimes known as John IV, (Note: Until recently, most English historians designated him as John IV, since the English king recognised his claim. However, French historians have never recognised him as Duke of Brittany, but rather as a pretender, a position that most historians now accept.) was Duke of Brittany and Earl of Richmond from 1341 to 1345 in dispute with his niece Joan of Penthièvre and her husband Charles of Blois. He was also Count of Montfort from 1322. He was the son of Arthur II, Duke of Brittany, and his second wife, Yolande of Dreux. His contesting of the inheritance of the Duchy of Brittany with his niece Joan led to the War of the Breton Succession, which in turn evolved into being part of the Hundred Years' War between England and France. John's patron in his quest was King Edward III of England. He died in 1345, 19 years before the end of the war, and the victory of his son John IV, Duke of Brittany, over Joan of Penthièvre and Charles of Blois.

== Biography ==
Jean of Montfort's coat of arms.

John of Montfort was born in 1295, the only son to Arthur II of Brittany and his second wife Yolande of Dreux. In 1322 he inherited from his mother the title of count of Montfort-l'Amaury, and in 1329 he married Joanna of Flanders in Chartres. Joanna was the daughter of Louis I, Count of Nevers, and Joan, Countess of Rethel. They had:

- John IV, Duke of Brittany (1339–1399), married (1) Mary of Waltham (1344–1362), daughter of King Edward III of England, in 1361 in Oxfordshire; (2) Joan Holland (1350–1384) in 1366 in London; (3) Joan of Navarre (1370–1437), daughter of King Charles II of Navarre, in 1386 in Saillé-près-Guérande.
- Joan of Brittany, Baroness of Drayton (1341–1402), married before 21 October 1385 to Ralph Basset, 3rd Baron Basset of Drayton

== Succession to Duke John III ==
On 30 April 1341, John III, Duke of Brittany, died without a male heir. His half-brother, John of Montfort, was a candidate for the succession, which was also claimed by Joan of Penthièvre, niece of John III and wife of Charles of Blois, himself a nephew of the Philip VI, King of France. The King was, of course, favourable to his nephew.

The Duchy of Brittany historically had a "semi-Salic" mode of inheritance; male primogeniture was followed unless no direct male descendants remained. At that point the closest female descendant inherited as duchess, with her husband serving as duke by "right of representation". The position of John of Montfort was legally founded on the belief that a brother (even a half-brother) was a closer heir than a beneficiary niece, and that the Salic form of inheritance adopted by the Kingdom of France should be followed. This argument was based on the fact that since 1297 Brittany had been a duché-pairie ("member and part of the crown"), and that the legislation of the suzerain kingdom should therefore be applied. Challenges to the Salic law of the Franks had historically been rejected for the Kingdom of France, allowing Philip V to gain the throne in 1316, and Philip VI most recently. This made Philip VI's support of Joan of Penthièvre quite ironic, in that the argument for Philip VI to inherit the Kingdom of France was based on the opposing philosophy that the crown should not be able to descend through the female line to Edward III.

A civil war, termed the War of the Breton Succession, then began and lasted 23 years. This conflict was also called La guerre de deux Jeanne, after the French names of the two duchesses in competition: Jeanne de Penthièvre and Jeanne de Flanders, wife of John of Montfort.

== Early stages of the War (1341) ==
After the funeral of John III, Charles of Blois returned to the Court of France and John of Montfort returned to his Breton estate in Guérande. Then, incited by his wife (according to tradition), he went with a small army to Nantes where he was well received by the inhabitants who swore their loyalty. John then went to Limoges where he managed to obtain the ducal treasury. John returned to Nantes and was recognised as Duke in May 1341 by an assembly composed of members of the towns and minor nobles, but shunned by the major vassals with the exception of Hervé VII, Count of Léon. Thanks to the ducal treasury, he recruited mercenaries which allowed him to perform in June and July a 'great ride in Brittany' (as described by Arthur de la Borderie) and take control of the duchy. John first gained Rennes, then Vannes and the places surrounding the Château de Suscinio, Auray, Hennebont, and then Quimperlé. Having failed to take the domains of Rohan, he submitted Quimper and Brest before descending to Carhaix, and then went back northward and captured Saint-Brieuc, Lamballe, Jugon, Dinan, Dol-de-Bretagne, and returned to Nantes via Ploërmel.

Always accompanied by Hervé VII of Léon, John obtained the submission, if not the support, of some of the major nobles who possessed several of these strongholds and had been loyal to Charles of Blois. However it would probably require getting Josselin, or the support of the high secular clergy and great lords, or more, to control the domains of the Penthièvres and the House of Rohan, which represented about two-thirds of Brittany. John also went to England and met with Edward III of England in Windsor, who promised him military assistance and invested him with the Honour of Richmond.

Charles of Blois then made an appeal to Philip VI, who summoned John of Montfort to a Court of Peers session in Conflans in September 1341. In this context by the judgment of Conflans, the Duchy of Brittany was attributed to Charles of Blois. Philip VI agreed to receive l'hommage lige of Charles of Blois on behalf of his wife, and confiscated from John of Montfort the French lands of the County of Montfort-l'Amaury, as well as the Viscounty of Limoges that he held more unduly.

In October 1341, Charles of Blois and John II, Duke of Normandy (later King of France), put together an army and penetrated into Brittany. They managed to retrieve a number of strongholds which had been lost, including Nantes, which relented on 21 November 1341 after three weeks of siege. John of Montfort was captured and imprisoned in the Louvre in Paris. Despite the change of camp of Hervé VII de Leon (due to criticisms from John regarding his handling of the siege of Nantes), Joanna, the wife of John of Montfort, continued the armed struggle supported by his allies.

== Subsequent stages of the War (1342–1345) ==
After a winter break that ended on 15 April 1342, Charles of Blois resumed the fight and regained a large part of Brittany between May and September 1342. King Edward III of England decided to intervene on behalf of the House of Montfort. Charles de Blois failed to take Hennebont, which was defended by Joanna of Flanders, while Robert III of Artois was mortally wounded besieging Vannes in vain leading an English contingent. In January 1343, through Pope Clement VI, a truce was signed at Malestroit to bring peace and the liberation of John of Montfort. The latter was released in September 1343 and retired to England 27 March 1345. His return to the struggle with reinforcements provided by King Edward III of England put an end to the truce. John of Montfort unsuccessfully laid siege to Quimper, then fell ill and died in Hennebont on 26 September 1345.

== Tomb of John of Montfort ==
He was buried in the convent of the Dominicans of Quimperlé (Note: Founded around 1254 by the Duchess Blanche of Champagne, and known in Breton as the Abbaty Guen.) where his tomb, which had already been desecrated, was found again in December 1883. His remains are now in the Church of Sainte-Croix de Quimperlé.

== See also ==
- Dukes of Brittany family tree
- List of works of the two Folgoët ateliers

== Sources ==
- de la Borderie, Arthur (1975). Histoire de la Bretagne (in French). Vol. Third Vol. (2nd ed.). Joseph Floch.
- Chibnall, A. C. (1965). Sherington: Fiefs and Fields of a Buckinghamshire Village. Cambridge University Press.
- George, Hereford Brooke (1875). Genealogical Tables Illustrative of Modern History. Oxford Clarendon Press.
- Jones, Michael (1988). The Creation of Brittany. The Hambledon Press.
- Leguay, Jean-Pierre; Martin, Hervé (1982). Fastes et malheurs de la Bretagne ducale 1213–1532 (in French). Ouest-France Université.
- Morvan, Frédéric (2009). La Chevalerie de Bretagne et la formation de l'armée ducale 1260–1341 (in French). Presses Universitaires de Rennes.
- Previté-Orton, Charles William (1978). The Shorter Cambridge Medieval History. Cambridge University Press.
- de la Villemarqué, Théodore Hersart (1884). "Le tombeau de Jean de Montfort". Société archéologique du Finistère (in French). 27 November 1884, Tome IX.

John of Montfort House of Dreux Cadet branch of the Capetian dynasty Born: 1295 Died: 1345
Regnal titles
Preceded by Yolande	Count of Montfort; 1322–1345	Succeeded by John IV
Preceded by John III	Duke of Brittany; 1341–1345 with Joanna and Charles as rivals	Succeeded by John IV
