= John I of Montfort =

French nobleman

John I de Montfort
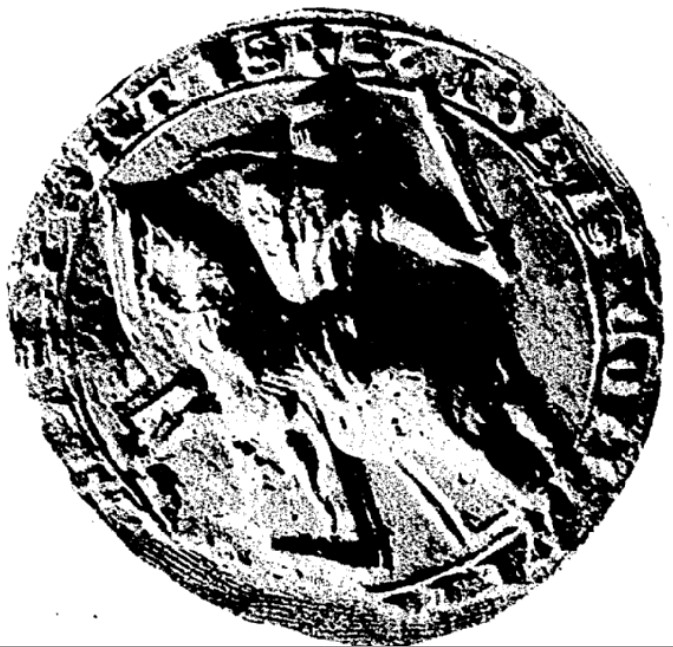
- Seal of John I de Montfort
- Born: 1228; France
- Died: 1249 (aged 21); Cyprus
- Noble family: House of Montfort
- Spouse: Jeanne de Châteaudun
- Issue: Beatrice, Countess of Montfort
- Father: Amaury de Montfort
- Mother: Béatrice of Burgundy

John I de Montfort (c. 1228 – 1249), Count of Montfort from 1241 to 1249, was the son of Amaury de Montfort, Count of Montfort, and of Béatrice of Burgundy. In 1248 he joined Louis IX's crusader fleet. Once the fleet arrived at Limassol, it was scattered by fierce storms and was forced to wait there to regroup. John died of sickness, while awaiting the rest of Louis's forces in Cyprus.

== Marriage ==
In March 1248 he married Jeanne de Châteaudun, Dame of Château-du-Loir, daughter of Geoffrey VI, Viscount of Châteaudun, and of Clémence des Roches. Their only child was:

- Beatrice de Montfort, Countess of Montfort-l'Amaury († 1312), who in 1260 married Robert IV (died 1282), comte de Dreux.

== Sources ==
- Folda, Jaroslav (2005). Crusader art in the Holy Land: from the Third Crusade to the fall of Acre, 1187-1291. Cambridge University Press.
- Maddicott, J. R. (1995). Simon de Montfort. Cambridge University Press.
- Pollock, M.A. (2015). Scotland, England and France after the Loss of Normandy, 1204-1296, 'Auld Amitie'. The Boydell Press.
