= Robert IV of Dreux =

Count of Dreux (1241–1282)

Robert IV, Count of Dreux
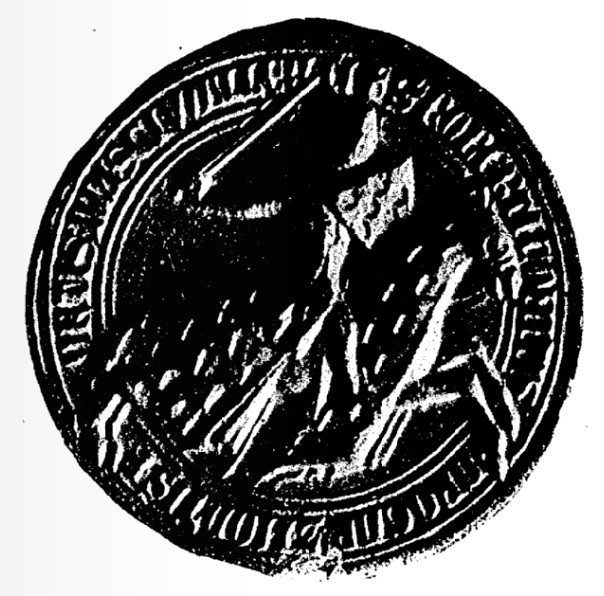
- Seal of Robert IV of Dreux
- Born: 1241
- Died: 1282 (aged 40–41)
- Noble family: House of Dreux
- Spouse: Beatrice de Montfort
- Issue Detail: Marie of Dreux; Yolande of Dreux, Queen of Scotland; John II of Dreux, Count of Dreux and Braine; Jeanne of Dreux, Countess of Braine; Beatrice of Dreux, Abbess of Pont-Royal; Robert of Dreux, Seigneur of Chateau-du-Loire
- Father: John I of Dreux
- Mother: Marie of Bourbon

Robert IV of Dreux (1241–1282), Count of Dreux, Braine and Montfort-l'Amaury, was the son of John I of Dreux and Marie of Bourbon.

Robert fought with Philip III of France in 1272 in his expedition to the Languedoc and was present at the capture of Foix.

In 1260 he married Beatrice de Montfort, Countess of Montfort-l'Amaury daughter of Jean I de Montfort and Jeanne, Dame de Chateaudun, and granddaughter of Amaury de Montfort. Their son John succeeded his father while their eldest daughter Yolande (1263–1322) married Alexander III, King of Scots, and later Arthur II, Duke of Brittany.

== List of children ==
1. Marie de Dreux (1261–1276), married in 1273 Mathieu IV de Montmorency
2. Yolande of Dreux, Countess de Montfort (1263–1323), married firstly on 15 October 1285 King Alexander III of Scotland, and secondly in 1292 Arthur II, Duke of Brittany.
3. John II of Dreux (1265–1309), married firstly Jeanne de Beaujeu, Dame de Montpensier (died 1308), in 1308 he married secondly Perrenelle de Sully
4. Jeanne, Countess de Braine, married firstly Count Jean IV de Roucy, and secondly John of Bar
5. Beatrice de Dreux (1270–1328), Abbess of Pont-Royal
6. Robert de Dreux, seigneur de Cateau-du-Loire

== Sources ==
- de Boos, Emmanuel (2004). L'armorial le Breton (in French). Somogy editions d'art.
- Bubenicek, Michelle (2002). Quand les femmes gouvernent: droit et politique au XIVe siècle:Yolande de Flandre, Droit et politique au XIV siecle (in French). Ecole des Chartes.
- Newman, William Mendel (1935). Les seigneurs de Nesle en Picardie (XIIe-XIIIe siècle): leurs chartes et leur histoire (in French). Vol. 91, Part 2. American Philosophical Society.
- Panton, Kenneth J., ed. (2011). "Yolande de Dreux". Historical Dictionary of the British Monarchy. Scarecrow Press Inc.
- Pollock, M. A. (2015). Scotland, England and France After the Loss of Normandy, 1204-1296: "Auld Amitie". The Boydell Press.
- Venning, Timothy (2020). A Chronology of Medieval British History: 1066–1307. Routledge.

Robert IV of Dreux House of Dreux Cadet branch of the Capetian dynasty Born: 1241 Died: 1282
Preceded by John I	Count of Dreux; 1249–1282	Succeeded by John II
