= Margaret de Fiennes, Baroness Mortimer of Wigmore =

French noblewoman

Margaret de Fiennes
- Baroness Mortimer of Wigmore
- Born: After 1269
- Died: 7 February 1333
- Noble family: Fiennes (by birth); Mortimer (by marriage)
- Spouse: Edmund Mortimer, 2nd Baron Mortimer of Wigmore
- Issue: Roger Mortimer, 1st Earl of March; Matilda Mortimer; John Mortimer; Walter Mortimer; Edmund Mortimer; Hugh Mortimer
- Father: Guillaume II de Fiennes (William II de Fiennes, Baron of Tingry)
- Mother: Blanche de Brienne

Margaret de Fiennes (aft. 1269 – 7 February 1333), was a French noblewoman who married the English marcher lord, Edmund Mortimer, 2nd Baron Mortimer of Wigmore, and was mother of Roger Mortimer, 1st Earl of March.

== Origins ==
She was a daughter of Guillaume II de Fiennes (William II de Fiennes, Baron of Tingry; died 1302) and his wife, Blanche, the daughter of Jean de Brienne (d. 1296), Grand Butler of France, and his first wife Jeanne de Châteaudun (his second marriage was to Marie de Coucy, widow of King Alexander II of Scotland).

Her grandfather, Sir John II of Brienne, was the third son of John of Brienne, King of Jerusalem and Emperor of Constantinople, and his third wife Berengaria of León, which made Margaret a cousin of Queen Eleanor of Castile. Her paternal grandparents were Enguerrand II de Fiennes and Isabel de Condé.

Her brother, Jean de Fiennes (d. 1340), married Isabel, daughter of Guy de Dampierre, Count of Flanders and his second wife Isabel of Luxembourg.

== Life ==
In September 1285, when she was fourteen or fifteen years old, Margaret married Edmund Mortimer, the second son of Roger Mortimer, 1st Baron Mortimer of Wigmore and his wife Maud de Braose. He had succeeded to his father's lands and barony in 1282 and was already a national hero after killing Llywelyn ap Gruffudd, his cousin, in battle.

They had eight known children:

- Roger Mortimer, 1st Earl of March (25 April 1287 – 29 November 1330) married Joan de Geneville, by whom he had twelve children.
- Maud de Mortimer, married Sir Theobald II de Verdun at Wigmore on 29 July 1302 (old calendar), by whom she had four daughters, Joan de Verdun, who married John de Montagu (d. August 1317), eldest son and heir apparent of William Montagu, 2nd Baron Montagu; Elizabeth de Verdun, who married Bartholomew de Burghersh, 1st Baron Burghersh; Margaret de Verdun, who married firstly Sir William le Blount of Sodington, Worcestershire, secondly Sir Mark Husee, and thirdly Sir John de Crophill; and (allegedly) Katherine de Verdun.
- John de Mortimer, accidentally slain in a joust by John de Leyburne.
- Walter de Mortimer, a priest, Rector of Kingston.
- Edmund de Mortimer, a priest, Rector of Hodnet, Shropshire and Treasurer of the cathedral at York.
- Hugh de Mortimer, a priest, Rector of church at Old Radnor, Wales.

They also had two daughters who became nuns; Elizabeth and Joan.

Her husband died on 17 July 1304 and she lived until 1333, probably being buried in Wigmore Abbey.

== Ancestry ==
Ancestors of Margaret de Fiennes, Baroness Mortimer of Wigmore

8. Guillaume de Fiennes, seigneur de Fiennes et de Tingry
4. Enguerrand II de Fiennes
9. Agnes of Dammartin
2. William de Fiennes, Baron of Tingry and Fiennes
10. Nicolas de Condé, Seigneur of Conde
5. Isabelle de Conde
11. Isabel de Morialmé
1. Margaret de Fiennes
12. John of Brienne
6. Jean de Brienne, Grand Butler of France
13. Berengaria of León
3. Blanche de Brienne
14. Geoffrey VI, Viscount of Châteaudun
7. Jeanne, Dame de Chateaudun
15. Clemence de Roches
