= John I of Dreux =

French nobleman (1215–1249)

John I, Count of Dreux
- Coat of arms of the Counts of Dreux
- Born: 1215
- Died: 1249 (aged 33–34)
- Noble family: House of Dreux
- Spouse: Marie of Bourbon
- Issue: Robert IV; Yolande
- Father: Robert III of Dreux
- Mother: Annora of Saint-Valéry

John I of Dreux (1215–1249), Count of Dreux and Braine, was the son of Robert III of Dreux and Annora (Aenor) of Saint-Valéry.

== Life ==
Knighted by King Louis IX of France, John accompanied the king on several campaigns, firstly in Poitou in 1242, where he fought at the Battle of Taillebourg. In 1249 he joined the king on the Seventh Crusade to Egypt, but died at Nicosia in the Kingdom of Cyprus before arriving.

In 1240 he married Marie (1220–1274), daughter of Archambaud VIII of Bourbon. They had three children:

- Robert IV (1241–1282), succeeded his father.
- John, joined Knights Templar
- Yolande, became the second wife of John I, Count of Dammartin.

== Sources ==
- Bubenicek, Michelle (2002). Quand les femmes gouvernent: droit et politique au XIVe siècle:Yolande de Flandre, Droit et politique au XIV siecle (in French). Ecole des Chartes.
- Morganstern, Anne McGee (2000). Gothic Tombs of Kinship in France, the Low Countries, and England. Penn State University Press.
- Schenk, Jochen (2012). Templar Families: Landowning Families and the Order of the Temple in France, c. 1120-1307. Cambridge University Press.

John I of Dreux House of Dreux Cadet branch of the Capetian dynasty Born: 1215 Died: 1249
Preceded by Robert III	Count of Dreux; 1234–1249	Succeeded by Robert IV
