= House of Dreux =

Cadet branch of the Capetian dynasty

- Arms of House of Dreux
- Parent house: Capetian dynasty
- Country: France; England
- Founded: 1137; 889 years ago
- Founder: Robert I, Count of Dreux
- Final ruler: Anne, Duchess of Brittany
- Titles: Count of Dreux; Count of Penthièvre; Earl of Richmond; Duke of Brittany
- Dissolution: 1514; 512 years ago
- Cadet branches: Lords of Beu; Lords of Bossart; Breton House of Dreux; Montfort of Brittany; Lords of Machecoul

The House of Dreux was a cadet branch of the Capetian dynasty. It was founded by Robert I, Count of Dreux, a son of Louis VI of France, who was given the County of Dreux as his appanage.

The Counts of Dreux were relatively minor nobles in France. The senior comital line became extinct in 1345. In 1212 the French king needed an obedient vassal to marry Alix, Duchess of Brittany and turned to his cousin Peter, a younger son of the Count of Dreux. Peter's marriage to the heiress of Brittany placed the House of Dreux in one of the most important fiefs of France. Brittany became a lay peerage of the France in 1297 and was formally recognised as a duchy (rather than a county) by the French court.

The Dreux rulers of Brittany descending from Peter used a canton ermine to mark them as cadets of the House of Dreux. Sometime in 1316, John III, Duke of Brittany adopted the plain ermine as the arms of the Duchy of Brittany.

At the death of John III in 1341, the succession to the duchy was contested by the duke's niece, Joan of Penthièvre, daughter of his full-brother, and John of Montfort, the duke's younger half-brother. Traditionally, females had been able to succeed as duchesses, but this practice was not consistent with most apanages granted by the French crown, which usually preferred male-only succession. Joan had married Charles of Blois, a nephew of King Philip VI, who supported their cause. Edward III of England, meanwhile, supported the Montforts. John died in 1345 from an illness caught while besieging Quimper. His young children were placed into English custody. John's son, John was allowed to return to Brittany in 1362. Meanwhile, Charles was captured by the English in 1347 and imprisoned until 1356. Charles ultimately died at the Battle of Auray in 1364, fighting the forces of the younger John.

In the Treaty of Guérande, which ended the War of the Breton Succession, the Duchy of Brittany was made hereditary in the males of the Montfort line, at the termination of which it was to pass to the males of Blois-Penthièvre. In 1420 the Penthièvre family imprisoned the duke in a failed attempt to regain Brittany. When the last male Montfort duke, Francis II of Brittany, died, the duchy passed to his daughter, Anne of Brittany.

== Arms ==
See: Category:Coats of arms of the House of Dreux

Pierre "Mauclerc" ("mauvais clerc", bad-cleric) de Dreux, the youngest of his family, was given a common difference among princes devoted to the clergy: a quarter of ermine. when he renounced the clergy, he kept the ermine difference. This prince was imposed in 1212 by the King of France Philippe Auguste as husband to the Alix, Duchess of Brittany. Since she did not have a coat of arms, Pierre Mauclerc used his own arms as bailiff of the Duchy of Brittany and his successors did the same.

For a century (from 1213 to 1316), the shields and banners of the Breton princes bore the Dreux chessboard of gold and azure (yellow and blue) with a quarter of ermine. The Dreux chessboard itself comes from the Vermandois chessboard (see Vermandois Arms) as they were related to the Vermandois counts, themselves of Capetian Heritage. It is depicted with or without a red border, depending on the representations. The Duke of Brittany being also Count of Richmond, at least when the King of England recognized him as having the Honour of Richmond ("fief of Richemont"), the coat of arms of this county were identical to those of the duchy or slightly differenced.

Jean III's stepmother was Yolande de Dreux (mother of his half-brother Jean de Montfort). He was in litigation with her about the inheritance of her father the late Duke Arthur II. Yolande, from the same family of Dreux as Jean III, bore the same arms as him. However, in medieval heraldry it was an element of law that only one person per nation could bear a unique coat of arms. Bearing the ducal coat of arms meant or implied sharing the authority and the ducal properties. Jean III could not accept this from his stepmother and since he could not forbid her to bear the arms of Dreux, he decided to change his own.

The other factor was that the arms of Dreux were differenced (the border of gules and the quartered ermine) thus indicating that they were the arms of a cadet, which was not very suitable for a large principality. They made Brittany a heraldic dependency of the small county of Dreux (originally dependent on the Duchy of Normandy). Simple arms of its own were desirable for Brittany from this point of view.

Finally, the main colours of the shield, chequy of azure and gold (in fact, gold and azure), indicated in the 13th century the Capetian cousinship with the kings of France, an element which increased their prestige. But, by the 14th century, the fleurs-de-lys having become the central element of French royal heraldry, the chequy had lost its initial prestige.

Ermine fur had gained in value from the 13th century to the 14th century, and surpassed that of vair (fur from the squirrel), previously more highly valued. Ermine was now seen as the fur of kings and judges.

Above all, ermine, a sort of "semé of ermine speckles" responded, aesthetically and symbolically, to the semé of fleurs-de-lys of the kings of France.

Arms of the House of Dreux

Count of Dreux

Duke of Brittany
Breton coat of arms from 1212 to 1316

Arms of John of Brittany, Earl of Richmond

Duke of Brittany
Breton coat of arms after 1316. These are still in use today by the government of Brittany.

Count of Penthièvre
Arms of Guy, Count of Penthièvre son of Arthur II, Duke of Brittany

== Family tree of House of Dreux ==
Louis VI; King of France; HOUSE OF CAPET
Louis VII; King of France	Robert I Count of Dreux; HOUSE OF DREUX
Robert II; Count of Dreaux	Philip; Bishop of Beauvais
Robert III; Count of Dreux	Peter I Duke of Brittany; BRANCH OF BRITTANY	Henry; Archbishop of Reims	John ∞ Alix, Countess of Mâcon, Vienne
John I Count of Dreux	John I Duke of Brittany
Robert IV; Count of Dreux	John II; Duke of Brittany
John II; Count of Dreux	Arthure II; Duke of Brittany
Robert V Count of Dreux	John III; Count of Dreux	Peter; Count of Dreux	John III; Duke of Brittany	Guy; Count of Penthièvre	John of Montfort; Earl of Richmond; House of Montfort-Brittany
John IV; Duke of Brittany
John V Duke of Brittany	Arthur III; Duke of Brittany	Richard; Count of Étampes
Francis I Duke of Brittany	Peter II; Duke of Brittany	Gilles; Lord of Chantocé	Francis II; Duke of Brittany
