= Arthur II of Brittany =

Duke of Brittany from 1305 to 1312

Arthur II
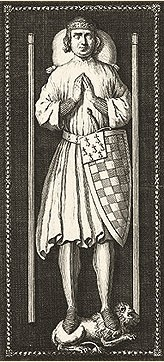

Duke of Brittany
- Reign: 18 November 1305 – 27 August 1312
- Predecessor: John II
- Successor: John III
- Born: 25 July 1261
- Died: 27 August 1312 (aged 51); Château de L'Isle
- Burial: Cordeliers Convent, Vannes
- Spouses: Marie, Viscountess of Limoges (m. 1275; died 1291) Yolande of Dreux (m. 1292)
- Issue Among others: John III, Duke of Brittany; Guy, Count of Penthièvre; Peter, Lord of Dol-Combourg; John, Count of Montfort; Beatrice, Lady of Laval; Joan, Countess of Marle; Alice, Countess of Vendôme; Blanche; Marie
- House: Dreux
- Father: John II, Duke of Brittany
- Mother: Beatrice of England

Arthur II (25 July 1261 – 27 August 1312), of the House of Dreux, was Duke of Brittany from 1305 to his death. He was the first son of John II and Beatrice, daughter of Henry III of England and Eleanor of Provence.

After he inherited the ducal throne, his brother John became Earl of Richmond.

As duke, Arthur was independent of the French crown. He divided his duchy into eight "battles": Léon, Kernev, Landreger, Penteur, Gwened, Naoned, Roazhon, and Sant Malou. In 1309, he convoked the first Estates of Brittany. (Note: Brittany would eventually have both an "Estates" and a "Parliament") It was the first time in French history that the third estate was represented.

Arthur died at Château de l'Isle in Saint Denis en Val and was interred in a marble tomb in the Cordeliers Convent at Vannes. The tomb was vandalised during the French Revolution, but later repaired and is on display today.

== Marriages and children ==
In 1275, Arthur married Marie, Viscountess of Limoges, daughter of Guy VI, Viscount of Limoges, and Margaret, Lady of Molinot. Her maternal grandparents were Hugh IV, Duke of Burgundy, and his first wife, Yolande of Dreux. They were parents of three children:

- John III, Duke of Brittany (8 March 1286 – 30 April 1341).
- Guy de Penthièvre, Count of Penthièvre (1287 – 1331); father of Joanna of Penthièvre.
- Peter of Brittany, Seigneur of Dol-Combourg and Sant-Maloù (1289 – 1312).

Marie died in 1291. In May 1292, Arthur married Yolande of Dreux, who was Countess of Montfort, daughter of Robert IV, Count of Dreux, and Beatrice de Montfort. Yolande had briefly been Queen of Scotland by her first marriage. They were parents of six children:

- John of Montfort (1295 – 16 September 1345).
- Beatrice of Brittany (1295–1384); married Guy X, Lord of Laval.
- Joan of Brittany (1296–1364); married Robert, Count of Marle, Lord of Cassel (son of Robert III, Count of Flanders).
- Alice of Brittany (1297–1377); married Bouchard VI, Count of Vendôme, a member of the House of Montoire.
- Blanche of Brittany (born c. 1300); considered to have died young.
- Marie of Brittany (1302–1371); a nun.

== See also ==
- Dukes of Brittany family tree

== Sources ==
- Howell, Margaret (2001). Eleanor of Provence: Queenship in Thirteenth-Century England. Blackwell Publishers.
- Sumption, Jonathan (1990). The Hundred Years War. Vol. I: Trial by Battle. Faber & Faber.
- Walsby, Malcolm (2007). The Counts of Laval: Culture, Patronage and Religion in Fifteenth- and Sixteenth- Century France. Ashgate.

Arthur II of Brittany House of Dreux Cadet branch of the Capetian dynasty Born: 2 July 1262 Died: 27 August 1312
Regnal titles
Preceded by Marie	Viscount of Limoges; 1275–1301 with Marie (1275–1291)	Succeeded by John III
Preceded by John II	Duke of Brittany; 1305–1312	Succeeded by John III
Preceded by John II	Count of Penthièvre; 1305–1312	Succeeded by Guy
Preceded by Beatrice	Count of Montfort-l'Amaury; 1311–1312 with Yolande	Succeeded by John II
