= Yolande of Dreux, Queen of Scotland =

Countess of Montfort, Queen of Scots, Duchess of Brittany (1263–1330)

Yolande of Dreux
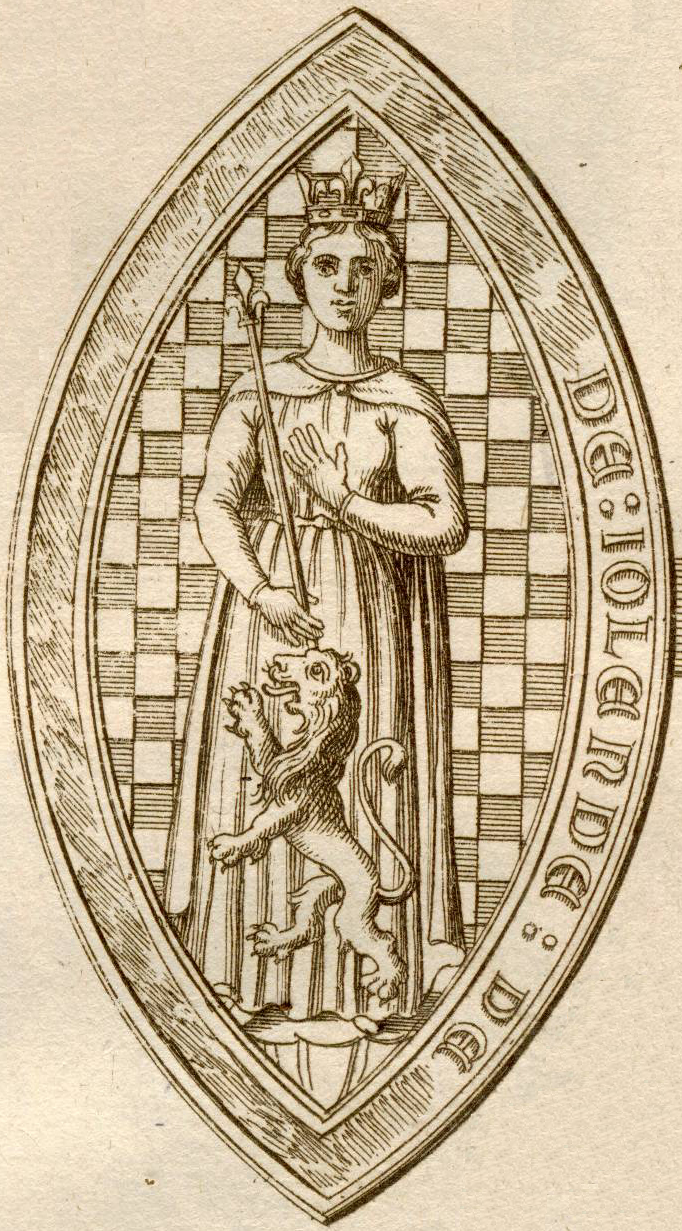

Countess of Montfort
- Reign: 1311–1322
- Predecessor: Beatrice
- Successor: John II

Queen consort of Alba (Scotland)
- Tenure: 1285–1286

Duchess consort of Brittany
- Tenure: 1305–1312
- Born: 20 March 1263
- Died: 2 August 1330 (aged 67)
- Spouse: Alexander III of Scotland; Arthur II, Duke of Brittany
- Issue more...: John of Montfort
- House: Dreux
- Father: Robert IV, Count of Dreux
- Mother: Beatrice, Countess of Montfort

Yolande of Dreux (20 March 1263 – 2 August 1330) was the countess of Montfort-l'Amaury from 1311 until 1322. Between 1285 and 1286, she was Queen of Scotland through her first marriage to Alexander III of Scotland. Through her second marriage to Arthur II, Duke of Brittany, she was Duchess of Brittany.

== Life ==
Coat of arms (House of Dreux)

=== Early life ===
She was the daughter of Robert IV, Count of Dreux, and Beatrice, Countess of Montfort. Her father was a patrilineal descendant of King Louis VI of France, making her a member of a cadet branch of the Capetian dynasty with powerful connections.

=== Queen of Scotland ===
In 1281, King Alexander III of Scotland lost his son David and two other children in the two following years, leaving his granddaughter, Margaret, Maid of Norway, as his heir presumptive. He needed to remarry to have a new heir to the throne. Yolande was daughter of the stepdaughter of Jean de Brienne, the second spouse of king Alexander's mother, queen dowager Marie de Coucy, and considered a suitable match. Yolande was related to her husband, Alexander III, through shared ancestry in the French noble houses of Coucy and Dreux. In addition to providing an heir for the Kingdom of Scotland, Alexander's marriage to Yolande represented a move to distance Alexander from his neighbour Edward I of England and to emphasize Scottish independence from England.

An embassy was sent from Scotland in February 1285 and returned with Yolande in the company of her brother John. The marriage was celebrated on 15 October 1285 at Jedburgh Abbey, attended by a great many nobles of France and Scotland.

Alexander died on either 18 March or 19 March 1286, after falling from his horse, while riding from his court at Edinburgh to join Yolande at Kinghorn. Following his death, queen Dowager Yolande moved to Stirling Castle and declared that she was pregnant. The Guardians of Scotland were elected by a parliament held at Scone, on 2 April or 28 April 1286 and swore to govern the kingdom until Alexander's declared heir Margaret of Norway arrived to take the throne or Yolande gave birth to a child who would be preferred over Margaret.

It is unclear what happened to her pregnancy; most likely she had a miscarriage, although by one account the Guardians gathered at Clackmannan on Saint Catherine's Day (25 November 1286) to witness the birth, but the child was stillborn, and tradition says the baby was buried at Cambuskenneth. It is also possible she had a phantom pregnancy, and according to one dubious English account she was faking pregnancy. After the queen dowager's pregnancy did not result in a living child, the council began preparations for Margaret of Norway to be taken to Scotland as their new sovereign.

Queen Dowager Yolande remained in Scotland for a couple of years supported by her dower provisions and living possibly at Stirling Castle: it is known that she was still in Scotland at least as late as in 1288. At some point, she returned to France.

=== Duchess of Brittany and Countess of Montfort ===
In May 1294, Yolande married Arthur II, Duke of Brittany. Together they had at least six children. Arthur died in 1312, being succeeded by his son John III, Duke of Brittany.

Yolande succeeded her mother as suo jure Countess of Montfort in 1311. She continued to manage her Scottish affairs: as late as shortly before her death, she is noted to have sent a knight to Scotland to see to her dower lands.

Yolande died on 2 August 1330 in the convent of Port-Royal des Champs outside of Paris. Her county of Montfort passed to her son John, who would later fight for his claim to his father's duchy in the Breton War of Succession.

== Issue ==
Yolande and Arthur had at least six children:

- John, born c. 1294, later Count of Montfort – known as Jean de Montfort
- Beatrice, born c. 1295, married Guy X of Laval
- Joan, born c. 1296–1364, married Robert, son of Robert III of Flanders
- Alice, born c. 1297–1377, married Bouchard VI of Vendôme
- Blanche, born c. 1300, died young
- Marie, born c. 1302, entered a convent

== Sources ==
- Connolly, Sharon Bennett (2017). Heroines of the Medieval World. Amberley Publishing.
- Duncan, A A M (2016). The Kingship of the Scots, 842-1292: Succession and Independence. Edinburgh University Press. ISBN 978-0-7486-1626-8.
- Macdougall, Norman, "L'Écosse à la fin du XIIIe sieclè: un royaume menacé" in James Laidlaw (ed.) The Auld Alliance: France and Scotland over 700 Years. Edinburgh University, Edinburgh, 1999. ISBN 0-9534945-0-0
- Müller, Annalena (2022). From the Cloister to the State: Fontevraud and the Making of Bourbon France, 1642-1100. Routledge.
- Marshall, Rosalind, Scottish Queens, 1034-1714
- Richard Oram: The Kings and Queens of Scotland
- Timothy Venning: The Kings and Queens of Scotland
- Mike Ashley: British Kings and Queens
- Elizabeth Ewan, Sue Innes and Sian Reynolds: The Biographical Dictionary of Scottish Women
- Mike Ashley, The Chronicle of Lanercost 1272-1346

Necrologe de l'abbaie de Port-Royal-des-Champs

Yolande of Dreux, Queen of Scotland House of Dreux Cadet branch of the Capetian dynasty Born: 1263 Died: 2 August 1330
Regnal titles
Preceded by Beatrice	Countess of Montfort; 1311–1322 with Arthur (1311–1312)	Succeeded by John II
Royal titles
Vacant Title last held by Margaret of England	Queen consort of Scotland; 1285–1286	Vacant Title next held by Elizabeth de Burgh
Vacant Title last held by Blanche of Navarre	Duchess consort of Brittany; 1305–1312	Succeeded by Isabella of Aragon
