= Geoffrey VI of Châteaudun =

Geoffrey VI (Geoffroy VI) (died 8 February 1250) was a Viscount of Châteaudun. He was the son of Geoffrey V, Viscount of Châteaudun, and Adelicia de Nevers. Although Adelicia's ancestry is not precisely known, she is likely the daughter of William IV, Count of Nevers, and Eléonore, Countess of Vermandois.

Geoffrey married twice and produced two famous daughters. His first wife was Mabile, of an unknown ancestry. Geoffrey and Mabile had three children: Pierre (d. after 1251), a monk at an unknown abbey, Isabelle and Odette.

Geoffrey's second wife was Clemence de Roches, widow of Theobald VI, Count of Blois. Geoffrey and Clemence had two children:

- Clemence, Viscountess of Châteaudun married Robert de Dreux, Seigneur de Beau, son of Robert III “Gasteblé”, Count of Dreux, great-grandson of Louis VI the Fat, King of France. Clemence's husband became the last Viscount of Châteaudun.
- Jeanne, Dame de Châteaudun married first John I, Count of Montfort secondly, John II of Brienne, Grand Butler of France, son of John of Brienne, King of Jerusalem and Emperor of Constantinople, and Berenguela of León.

Geoffrey was succeeded by his daughter Clemence, who became the Viscountess of Châteaudun.

== Sources ==
- Perry, Guy (2013). John of Brienne: King of Jerusalem, Emperor of Constantinople, c. 1175–1237. Cambridge University Press. ISBN 978-1-107-04310-7.
