= Edmund Mortimer, 2nd Baron Mortimer of Wigmore =

2nd Baron Mortimer

Edmund Mortimer
- Baron Mortimer of Wigmore
- Arms of Mortimer: Barry or and azure, on a chief of the first two pallets between two base esquires of the second over all an inescutcheon argent
- Born: c. 1251
- Died: 17 July 1304; Wigmore Castle
- Buried: Wigmore Abbey
- Noble family: Mortimer
- Spouse: Margaret de Fiennes
- Issue: Roger Mortimer, 1st Earl of March; Matilda Mortimer; John Mortimer; Walter Mortimer; Edmund Mortimer; Hugh Mortimer
- Father: Roger Mortimer, 1st Baron Mortimer
- Mother: Maud de Braose

Edmund Mortimer, 2nd Baron Mortimer of Wigmore (c. 1251 – 17 July 1304) was the second son and eventual heir of Roger Mortimer, 1st Baron Mortimer of Wigmore. His mother was Maud de Braose.

== Life ==
As a younger son, Edmund had been intended for clerical or monastic life, and had been sent to study at Oxford University. He was made Treasurer of York in 1265. By 1268 he is recorded as studying theology in the house of the Archbishop of York. King Henry III of England showed favour by supplementing his diet with the luxury of venison. The sudden death of his elder brother, Ralph, in 1274, made him heir to the family estates; yet he continued to study at Oxford. But his father's death eventually forced his departure.

Edmund returned to the March in 1282 as the new Baron Mortimer of Wigmore and immediately became involved in Welsh Marches politics. After Edmund's kinsman, the Welsh prince Llywelyn ap Gruffudd, was killed and beheaded at the Battle of Orewin Bridge, Edmund then sent his brother Roger Mortimer, 1st Baron Mortimer of Chirk to present Llywelyn's severed head to King Edward I of England at Rhuddlan Castle. The head was displayed on the Tower of London as a warning to all rebels.

In return for his services Edmund was knighted by King Edward I at Winchester in 1283. He served in the king's Scottish campaigns, and returned to fight in Wales. He was mortally wounded in a skirmish near Builth and died at Wigmore Castle on 17 July 1304.

== Marriage and issue ==
He married in September 1285 Margaret de Fiennes, daughter of William II de Fiennes, Baron of Tingry, and Blanche de Brienne (herself the granddaughter of John of Brienne by his third wife Berenguela of Leon), the family entering the blood royal. Their surviving children were:

- Roger Mortimer, 1st Earl of March (25 April 1287 – 29 November 1330) married Joan de Geneville, by whom he had twelve children.
- Maud de Mortimer (also found noted as Maud), married Sir Theobald II de Verdun at Wigmore on 29 July 1302 (old calendar), by whom she had four daughters, Joan de Verdun, who married John de Montagu (d. August 1317), eldest son and heir apparent of William Montagu, 2nd Baron Montagu; Elizabeth de Verdun, who married Bartholomew de Burghersh, 1st Baron Burghersh; Margaret de Verdun, who married (1st) Sir William le Blount of Sodington, Worcestershire, (2nd) Sir Mark Husee, and (3rd) Sir John de Crophill; and (allegedly) Katherine de Verdun.
- John de Mortimer, accidentally slain in a joust by John de Leyburne.
- Walter de Mortimer, a priest, Rector of Kingston.
- Edmund de Mortimer, a priest, Rector of Hodnet, Shropshire and Treasurer of the cathedral at York.
- Hugh de Mortimer, a priest, Rector of church at Old Radnor.

They also had two daughters who became nuns; Elizabeth and Joan.

== Bibliography ==
- Mortimer, Ian. The Greatest Traitor: The Life of Sir Roger Mortimer, 1st Earl of March, Ruler of England 1327–1330, (Jonathan Cape, London 2003).
- Cokayne, G. E. The Complete Peerage of Great Britain and Ireland of titles extinct, abeyant, and dormant, 14 vols (London, 1910–37).
- Prestwich, M, The Three Edwards: War and State in England, 1272–1377, London, 2003.
- Prestwich, M, Plantagenet England, 1265–1399 London, 2005.
- Richardson, Douglas (2011). Everingham, Kimball G. (ed.). Magna Carta Ancestry: A Study in Colonial and Medieval Families. Vol. IV (2nd ed.). Salt Lake City. ISBN 978-1460992708.

Peerage of England
Preceded by Roger Mortimer	Baron Mortimer of Wigmore; 1282–1304	Succeeded by Roger Mortimer created Earl of March
