= John III of Brittany =

Duke of Brittany from 1312 to 1341

John III
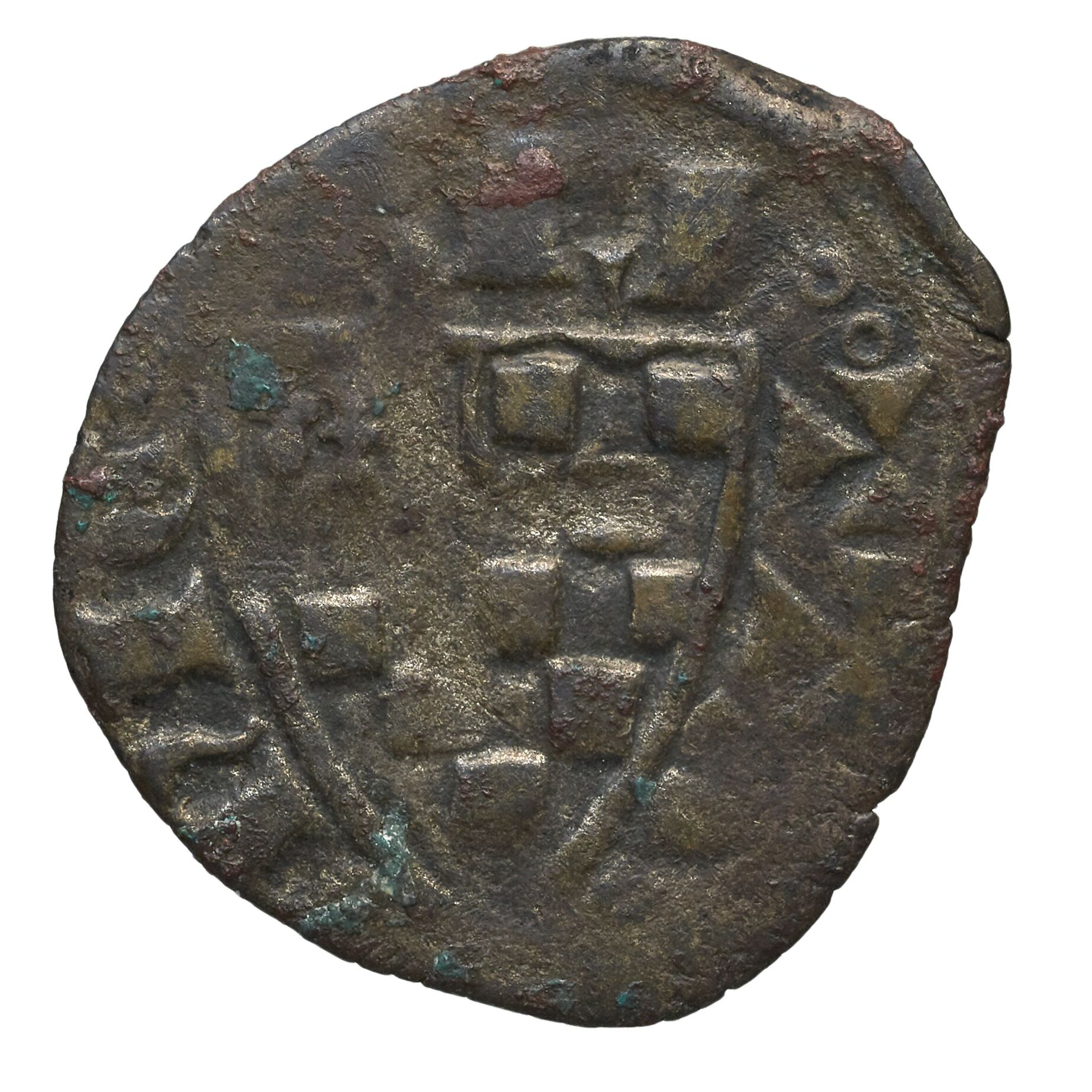
- The coin of John III

Duke of Brittany
- Reign: 27 August 1312 – 30 April 1341
- Predecessor: Arthur II
- Successor: disputed between: John of Montfort and Joanna with Charles I
- Born: 8 March 1286; Château de Champtoceaux
- Died: 30 April 1341 (aged 55); Caen
- Burial: Notre-Dame des Carmes
- Spouses: Isabella of Valois (m. 1297; died 1309) Isabella of Castile (m. 1310; died 1328) Joan of Savoy (m. 1329)
- House: Dreux
- Father: Arthur II, Duke of Brittany
- Mother: Marie, Viscountess of Limoges

John III the Good (in Breton Yann III, in French Jean III; 8 March 1286 – 30 April 1341) was Duke of Brittany, from 1312 to his death and 5th Earl of Richmond from 1334 to his death. He was the son of Arthur II, Duke of Brittany, and his first wife Marie, Viscountess of Limoges. John was strongly opposed to his father's second marriage to Yolande and attempted to contest its legality.

In 1297, John married Isabella of Valois, the eldest child of Charles, Count of Valois and his first wife Margaret of Naples. At the time of their marriage John was eleven years old and his bride five. She died childless in 1309.

In 1310, John married his second wife, Isabella of Castile. She died childless in 1328.

In 1329, John married his third wife Joan of Savoy. He predeceased his third wife by three years and died childless. He was unwilling to cede the Duchy of Brittany to his half-brother John of Montfort, son of his hated step-mother Yolande. He wished to leave the duchy to the French King Philip VI, but his nobles objected.

== Arms ==
Coat of arms as duke until 1316

In 1316, he simplified his coat of arms to plain ermine. This is still the arms of Brittany.

== See also ==
- Dukes of Brittany family tree

== Sources ==
- Jones, Michael (1988). Creation of Brittany: A Late Medieval State. Hambledon Press.
- Morvan, Frederic (2009). La Chevalerie bretonne et la formation de l'armee ducale (in French). Presses Universitaires de Rennes.

John III of Brittany House of Dreux Cadet branch of the Capetian dynasty Born: 8 March 1286 Died: 30 April 1341
Regnal titles
Preceded by Arthur II	Duke of Brittany; 1312–1341	Succeeded by Joan
Preceded by Guy VII	Viscount of Limoges; 1312–1331	Succeeded by Joan
Peerage of England
Preceded by John of Brittany	Earl of Richmond; 1334–1341	Succeeded by Robert III of Artois
