= Jeanne de Clisson =

Breton noblewoman and privateer (1300–1359)

Jeanne Louise de Belleville, de Clisson
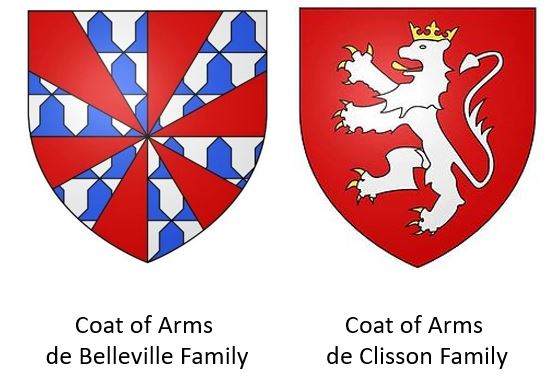
- Dual coat of arms of the de Belleville and de Clisson families with the motto: Pour ce qui me plaist ("For what pleases me")
- Born: 1300; Belleville-sur-Vie, Kingdom of France
- Died: 1359 (aged 58–59); Hennebont, Duchy of Brittany
- Other name: Jeanne de Belleville
- Spouses: Geoffrey de Châteaubriant VIII; Guy de Penthièvre; Olivier IV de Clisson; Sir Walter Bentley
- Children: Geoffrey IX de Châteaubriant; Louise de Châteaubriant; Isabeau de Clisson; Maurice de Clisson; Olivier V de Clisson; Guillaume de Clisson; Jeanne de Clisson
- Piratical career
- Nickname: Lioness of Brittany
- Type: Privateer
- Allegiance: First allegiance: Party of Blois: Bretons; Kingdom of France Second allegiance: Party of Montfort: Bretons; Kingdom of England
- Years active: c. 1343 – c. 1356
- Commands: Black Fleet; My Revenge

Jeanne de Clisson (1300–1359), also known as Jeanne de Belleville and the Lioness of Brittany, was a French–Breton noblewoman who became a privateer to avenge her husband after he was executed for treason by King Philip VI of France. She crossed the English Channel, targeted French ships, and regularly slaughtered almost their entire crew. It was her practice to leave at least one sailor alive to carry her message of vengeance.

== Early life ==
Jeanne Louise de Belleville, de Clisson, Dame de Montaigu, was born in 1300 in Belleville-sur-Vie (Belleville on the river Vie) in the Vendée in the Gâtine Vendéenne on the French side of the border with the Duchy of Brittany. She was a daughter of nobleman Maurice IV Montaigu of Belleville and Palluau (1263–1304) and Létice de Parthenay of Parthenay (1276–?).

As a seigneur family in the Bas-Poitou area, the de Montaigu family would have had direct or indirect business in winemaking, salt farming, and the merchant movements of these goods to and from markets as far as the Iberian Peninsula and up towards England. This would have included contacts with merchant shipping along the river Vie and along the coast of Poitou and Brittany with an island stronghold at Yeu.

Jeanne's father died when she was four years old and there are no known records indicating that her mother remarried. It also appears she was born from her father's second marriage, as some records suggest he was previously married to Sibille of Châteaubriant. This alliance had apparently produced a son, Maurice V Montaigu. In 1320(?), on the death of her half-brother Maurice V, Jeanne inherited the seigneury of Montaigu and that of Belleville, as he had no heirs.

=== First marriage ===
In 1312, Jeanne, aged about 12 years old, married her first husband, 19-year-old Geoffrey de Châteaubriant VIII (died 1326), a Breton nobleman, who himself was already a widower to Alix de Thouars. They had two children:

- Geoffrey IX (1314–1347), inherited his father's estates as Baron, died in the Battle of La Roche-Derrien
- Louise (1316–1383), married Guy XII de Laval and subsequently inherited her brother's estate as Baroness.

=== Second marriage ===
In 1328, Jeanne married Guy de Penthièvre of the House of Penthièvre, widower of Joan of Avaugour and second son of the Duke of Brittany. Jeanne may have done this to protect her underage children.

The union was short-lived, as relatives of the ducal family – in particular, from the de Blois faction – laid a complaint with the bishops of Vannes and Rennes to protect their heritage, and an investigation was conducted on 10 February 1330, resulting in the marriage being annulled by Pope John XXII.

Guy then married into the de Blois faction to Marie de Blois, who was also a niece of Philip VI of France. Guy died unexpectedly on 26 March 1331, and his heritage passed to his daughter Jeanne of Penthièvre.

== Marriage to Olivier IV de Clisson ==
In 1330, Jeanne married Olivier IV de Clisson, a wealthy Breton who held a castle at Clisson, a manor house in Nantes, and lands at Blain. Olivier was initially married to Blanche de Bouville (died 1329). Olivier had a son, Jean, from this first marriage, who would go on to inherit his mother's lands as the Lord of Milly, near Paris.

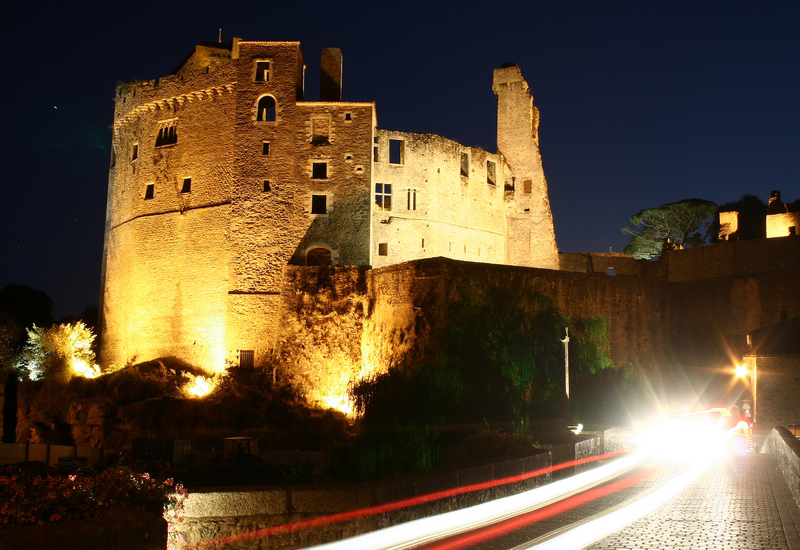
Château de Clisson

Jeanne, a recent widow herself of the Lord of Châteaubriant, controlled areas in Poitou just south of the Breton border from Beauvoir-sur-Mer in the west to Châteaumur in the southeast of Clisson. In the marriage contract, there is evidence of Jeanne ensuring that the inheritances of her children from her previous marriage were legally secured. Combining these assets made Jeanne and Olivier the seigneurial power (senior Lord of an area) in the border region of Brittany. Jeanne and Olivier eventually had five children:

- Isabeau (1330-1343), born out of wedlock (shortly before marriage to Olivier), she eventually married John I of Rieux and therefore was mother of Jean II de Rieux
- Maurice (1333–1334), in Blain
- Olivier V (1336–1407), his father's successor, a future Constable of France, nicknamed "The Butcher"
- Guillaume (1338–1345), died of exposure
- Jeanne (1340–?), married Jean Harpedanne, Lord of Montendre IV's successor

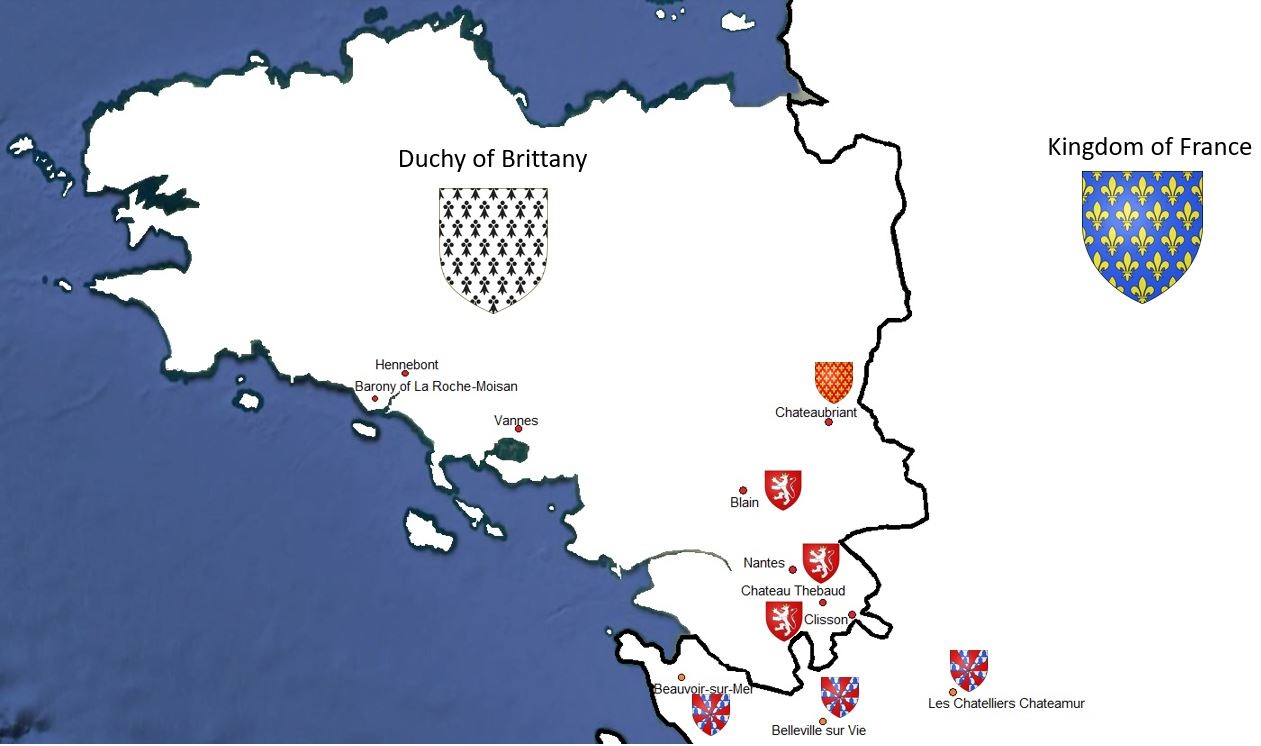
Map of the Clisson and Belleville estates in Brittany and France

Jeanne at one point took Olivier to court with regard to access to remuneration from his estates as had been agreed upon in the marriage contract. This case was heard by King Philip VI, who found in her favour, as witnesses confirmed such promises had occurred. It appears this issue was resolved amicably.

=== Breton War of Succession ===
During the Breton War of Succession, the de Clissons sided with the French choice for the vacant Breton ducal crown, Charles de Blois, against the English preference, John de Montfort. The extended de Clisson family was not in full agreement in this matter, and Olivier IV's brother, Amaury de Clisson, embraced the de Montfort party whilst his other brother, Garnier de Clisson, had defended Brest against the de Montforts.

In January 1342, the de Clisson castle of Blain was chosen as headquarters by Robert Bertrand, the French King's Lieutenant sent to aid Charles de Blois.

In 1342, the English, after four attempts, captured the city of Vannes. Jeanne's husband Olivier and Hervé VII de Léon, the military commanders defending this city, were captured. Olivier was the only one released after an exchange for Ralph de Stafford, 1st Earl of Stafford (a prisoner of the French), and a surprisingly low sum was demanded. This led Olivier to be subsequently suspected of not having defended the city to his fullest and to be accused by Charles de Blois of being a traitor.

=== Tournament and trial ===
On 19 January 1343, the Truce of Malestroit was signed between England and France. Under the perceived safe conditions of this truce, Olivier and fifteen other Breton and Norman lords were invited to a tournament on French soil, where he was subsequently arrested, taken to Paris and tried by his peers. André Duchesne, writing 300 years later claims that the evidence was private correspondence between King Edward with these lords to convince them to change allegiances, which was contrary to the Ninth Article of the Truce, i.e. That no-one in the obedience of one King, at the time of Truce, should put himself under the obedience of the other, while it continued.

==== Failed rescue attempt ====
Jeanne tried in vain to have Olivier set free. She seems to have tried to bribe a King's sergeant. Jeanne was therefore summoned to answer charges of rebellion, disobedience, and excesses against the King.

Jeanne managed to evade arrest as she was being protected by Jean de Clisson (Olivier's eldest son from his first marriage, at the time the Lord of Milly, a castle about 55 km east of Paris) and accompanied by Guilaume Bérard, Jeanne's squire and valet, Guionnet de Fay, and Guillaume Denart. Jean himself took refuge in Brittany after this and died soon after. Jeanne ignored the summons and was found guilty in absentia in June 1343.

==== Execution ====
On 2 August 1343, Olivier IV was executed by beheading at Les Halles.

In the year of our Grace one thousand three hundred and forty-three, on Saturday, the second day of August, Olivier, Lord of Clisson, knight, prisoner in the Chatelet of Paris for several treasons and other crimes perpetrated by him against the king and the crown of France, and for alliances that he made with the king of England, enemy of the king and kingdom of France, as the said Olivier ... has confessed, was by judgement of the king given at Orleans drawn from the Chatelet of Paris to Les Halles ... and there on a scaffold had his head cut off. From there, his corpse was drawn to the gibbet of Paris and there hanged on the highest level, and his head was sent to Nantes in Brittany to be put on a lance over the city's Sauvetout Gate as a warning to others.

This execution shocked the nobility, as the evidence of guilt was not publicly demonstrated and the process of desecrating/exposing a body was reserved mainly for low-class criminals. The execution was judged harshly by Jean Froissart and his contemporaries.

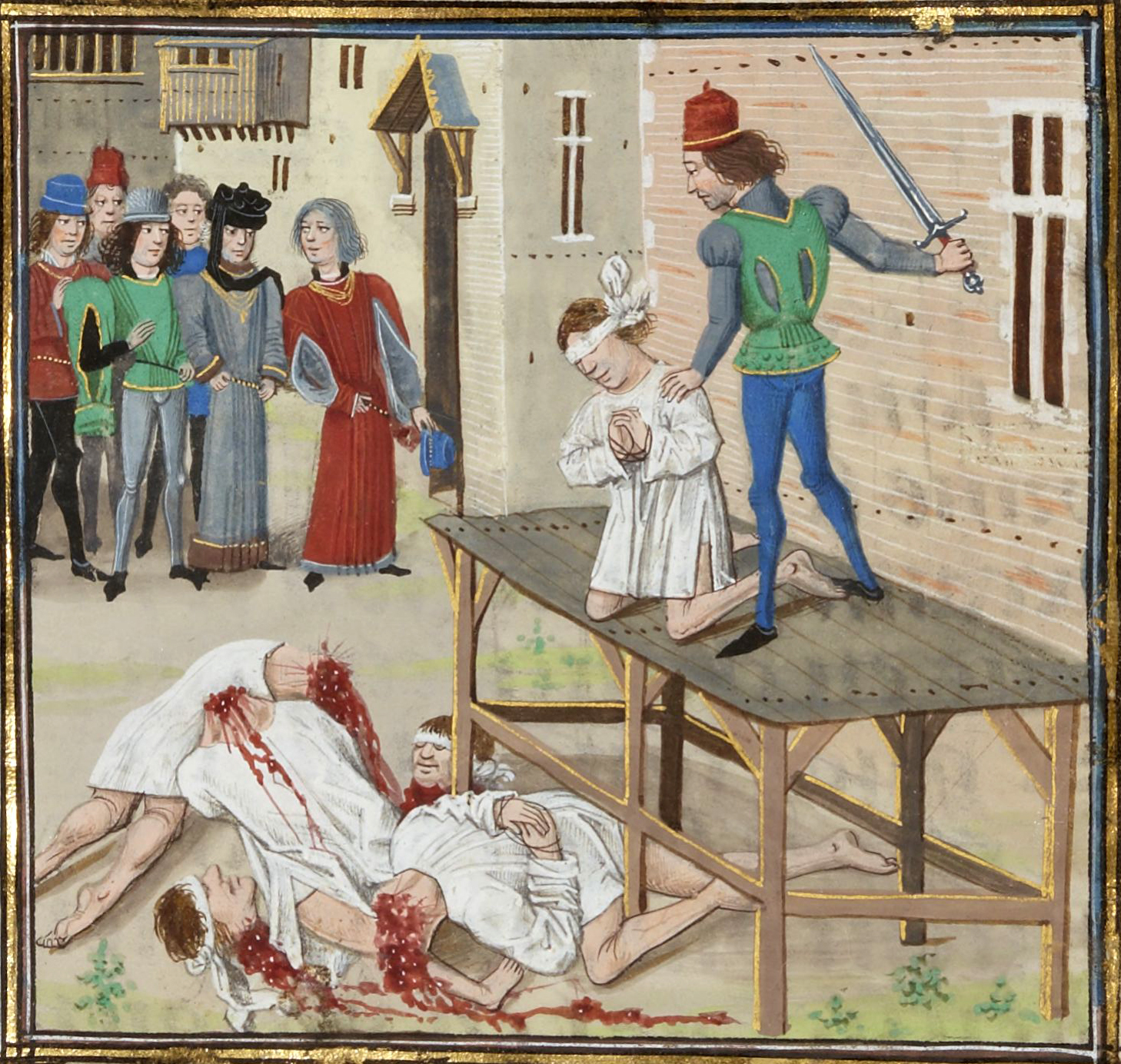
Execution of Olivier IV de Clisson. Painting attributed to Loyset Liédet, Flemish illuminator (v. 1420 – v. 1483) in the Chronicles of Lord Jehan Froissart.

==== Evading arrest ====
On 26 August 1343, for her attempted bribery of the King's sergeant, Jeanne was also charged with the crime of lèse-majesté and subsequently sentenced to banishment, with confiscation of her property.

==== Head on the pike ====
Jeanne took her two young sons, Olivier and Guillaume, from Clisson to Nantes, to show them the head of their father displayed at the Sauvetout gate.

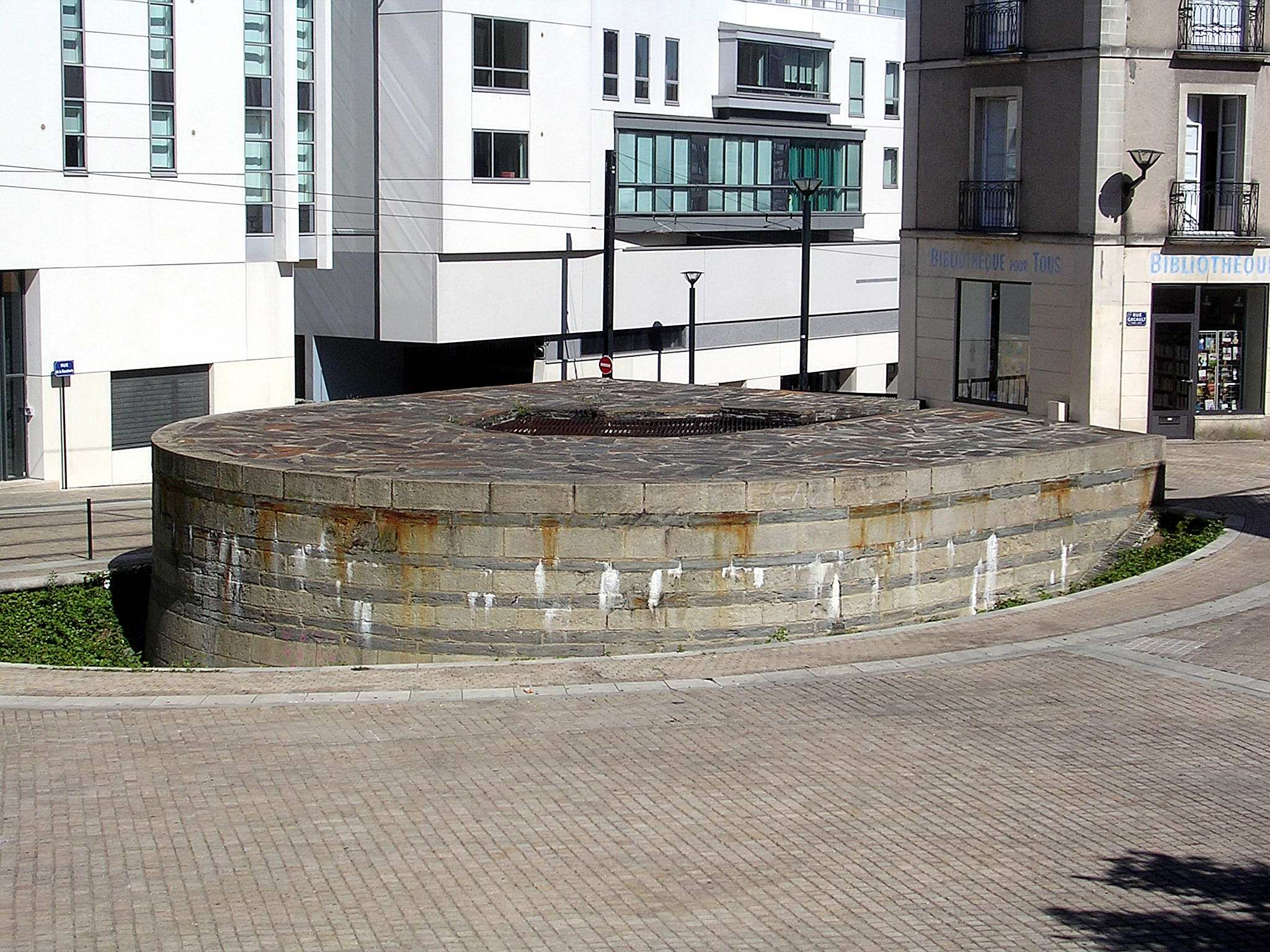
Remnants of the Sauvetout Gate in Nantes. In its heyday, the gate would have been similar in design to that of the St Michaels gate in Guérande.

Jeanne, enraged by her husband's execution, swore retribution against King Philip VI and Charles de Blois. She considered their actions a cowardly murder.

== Piracy and later life ==
After Olivier's execution, Jeanne sold the de Clisson estates, raised a force of about 400 loyal men, and started attacking French forces in Brittany. Jeanne is said to have attacked:

- A castle at Touffou, near Bignon. The castle was built on the edge of a forest in the parish of Bignon, not far from the abbey of Villeneuve. The castle was under command of Galois de la Heuse, an officer of Charles de Blois, who apparently recognised Jeanne and let her in, whereupon her forces massacred the entire garrison with the exception of one individual.
- A garrison at Château-Thébaud, about 20 km southeast of Nantes, which had been a former post under the control of her husband.

=== Black Fleet ===
Jeanne is said to have converted three merchant ships for war. These may have also been painted black and their sails dyed red according to some references. Some versions of the story state that the English King and Breton sympathizers assisted her in this. Her flagship was apparently also named My Revenge.

The main sailing ships available in Brittany at that time were of the cog type (a flat-bottomed cargo ship with high sides and distinctive straight-angled stem and stern post). The most visible giveaway that a ship was no longer just meant for cargo was if it had a forecastle or aftercastle constructed on it. Not all of these were permanent in structure and were not integrated into the hull.

The ships of this Black Fleet are said to have initially attacked shipping in the Bay of Biscay, probably from the island fortress of Yeu, but eventually moved into the English Channel hunting down French commerce ships, whereupon her force would kill entire crews, leaving only a few witnesses to transmit the news to the French King. This earned Jeanne the moniker "The Lioness of Brittany". The type of warfare is termed commerce raiding and is similar to guerrilla warfare on land. Its main intent is to destroy or disrupt the logistics of an enemy on the open seas by attacking merchant shipping rather than engaging actual combatants. A few ships would be used together in the employment of a swarming tactic. The crews would be equipped with grappling equipment for closing in and weapons such as crossbows, swords, and daggers.

The Gironde estuary, the Breton coast near Saint Mathieu, the Charente estuary, and the islands of Oléron, Re, and Aix were known to be especially dangerous since confined waters made it easier for ships to be outmaneuvered and surprised. The Pointe du Raz was an especially good spot to conduct piracy since these waters were dotted with numerous small, often uninhabited islands which were ideal for ambushes. Local tradition on the island of Yeu is that Jeanne may have used her family castle on that island for the initial attacks. Jeanne is also said to have attacked coastal villages in Normandy and have put several to sword and fire.

Jeanne is sometimes cited as a privateer of the English, which would have meant she operated under certain legal protections and obligations. No letter patent or royal letter of protection is known to exist, however. In 1346, during the Crécy campaign in northern France, Jeanne used her ships to supply the English forces.

The French eventually managed to engage her fleet and sink her flagship. Jeanne and her two sons were adrift for five days; her son Guillaume died of exposure. Jeanne and Olivier were finally rescued and taken to Morlaix by Montfort supporters. Jeanne continued her piracy in the channel for another 13 years.

Both sides employed pirates and operated with royal permission to prey on each other's shipping.

=== Fourth marriage ===
In the 1350s, Jeanne married for a fourth time to Walter Bentley, one of King Edward III's military deputies during the campaign. Bentley had been appointed Edward's lieutenant in Brittany in September 1350. In 1351, he lifted the sieges of Ploërmel and Fougeres and on 4 August 1352, Bentley won the Battle of Mauron and was rewarded for his services with "the lands and castles" of Beauvoir-sur-mer, of Ampant, of Barre, Blaye, Châteauneuf, Ville Maine, the island of Chauvet, and from the islands of Noirmoutier and Bouin.

=== Estate disputes ===
Raoul de Caours, Edward III's Lieutenant in the neighbouring province of Poitou, had wrested control of several of Jeanne's properties from the French. In 1349, Edward III ordered that the estates be returned to Bentley, but this changed when Edward III changed allegiances and started negotiating with the new Duke of Brittany, Charles.

As part of a treaty with Charles, Duke of Brittany, Edward III ordered Bentley to surrender Jeanne's remaining castles in Brittany. Bentley refused and traveled to England to plead their case. He was imprisoned in the Tower of London while his case was heard. Eventually he was released and allowed to return. At this point the war had come to a halt as both nations were exhausted, one of the main factors being the spread of the Black Plague which had decimated at least 20 percent of the population.

By January 1357, Walter and Jeanne were granted the barony of La Roche-Moisan as compensation.

=== Death ===
Jeanne finally settled at the Castle of Hennebont, a port town on the Brittany coast, which was in the territory of her de Montfort allies. Walter died in December 1359 and Jeanne a few weeks later.

== Local tradition ==
=== The sea castle of Île d'Yeu ===
The lords of Belleville also owned the island of Yeu, as part of their maritime trade. Jeanne had inherited Yeu from her deceased brother and had the old wooden fort demolished and replaced with a stone fortress. This was used to minimise pirate raids. When she eventually married Olivier, he added to the design. This was eventually one of her properties seized by the French Crown. Local tradition speaks of the "red men" or English Soldiers who came to rescue Jeanne at one stage when she had become entrapped by the French.

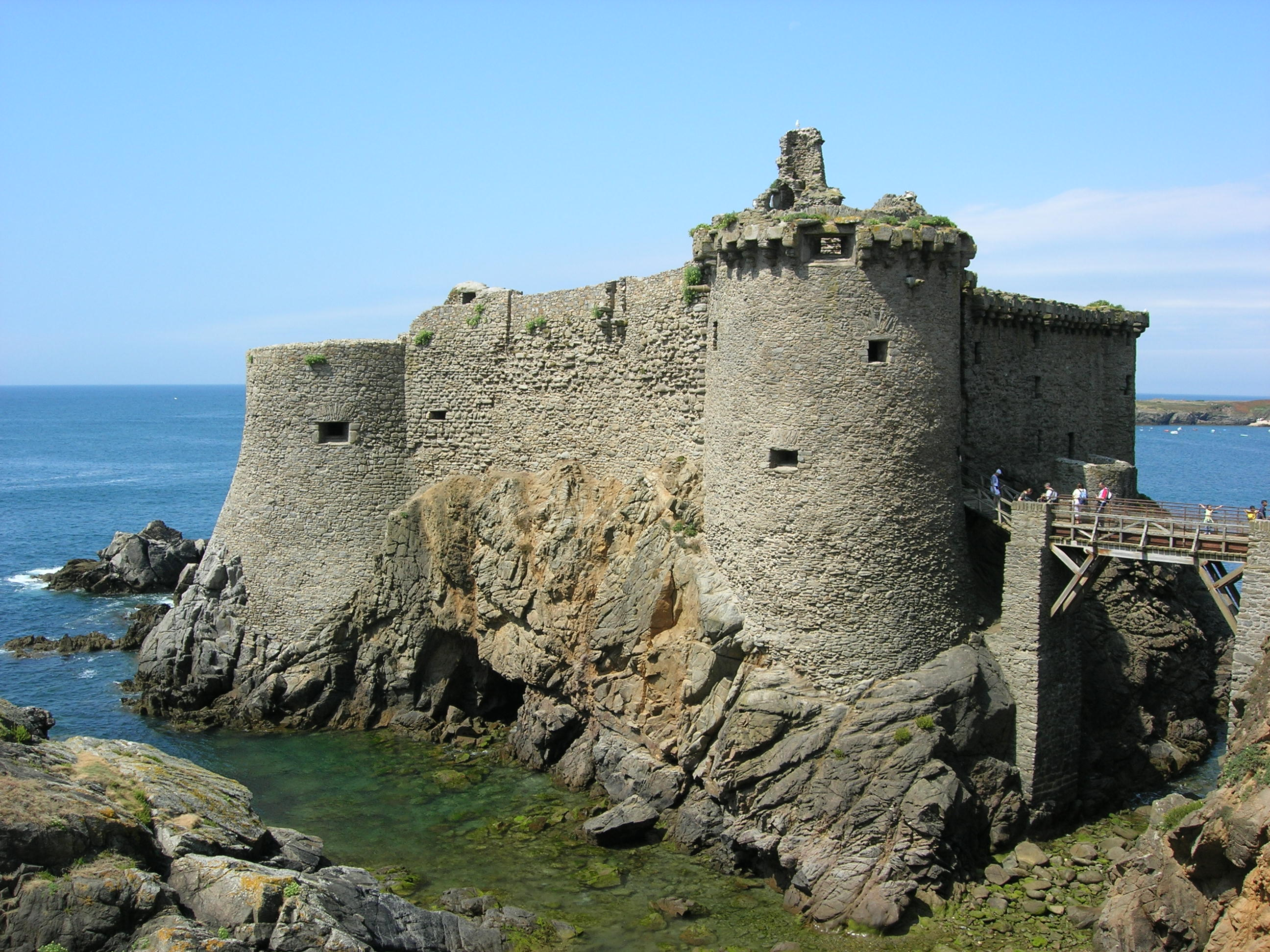
Vieux-château de l'Île d'Yeu

== Historical evidence ==
Verifiable references relating to Jeanne's exploits exist. These include:

- Papal records of the annulment of her second marriage.
- A French judgement from 1343 convicting Jeanne as a traitor and confirming the confiscation of the de Clisson lands.
- Records from the English court from 1343, indicating King Edward granting Jeanne an income from lands controlled in Brittany by the English.
- Jeanne is mentioned in the truce between France and England in 1347 as an English ally. (Truce of Calais, 28 September 1347)
- A 15th-century manuscript, known as the Chronographia Regum Francorum, confirms some of the details of her life.
- Amaury de Clisson, the brother of Olivier, is used as an emissary from Joanna of Flanders (Jehanne de Montfort) to ask King Edward III for aid to relieve Hennebont. The de Clisson family was at that stage definitely on the de Montfort side.
- Records exist where shortly after Olivier de Clisson's execution, several other knights were accused of similar crimes. The Lord of Malestroit and his son, the Lord of Avaugour, Sir Tibaut de Morillon, Alain de Quédillac, Guillaume, Jean and Olivier de Brieux, Denis du Plessis, Jean Malart, Jean de Senadavy, Thibaut de Morillon, Denis de Callac, and other lords of Brittany, to the number of ten knights and squires, were beheaded at Paris. Four other knights of Normandy: Sir William Baron, Sir Henry de Malestroit, the Lord of Rochetesson, and Sir Richard de Persy were put to death upon reports.
- The name of Jeanne de Belleville is also attached to the Breviary of Belleville, a book of prayers that follow the liturgical year. This manuscript in Latin and in French and in two volumes dated around 1323–1326 with illuminations by Jean Pucelle. Jeanne de Belleville would have received it as a gift for her wedding with Olivier. Around 1379–1380, an inventory was made of King Charles V's property, and the breviary was described herein.
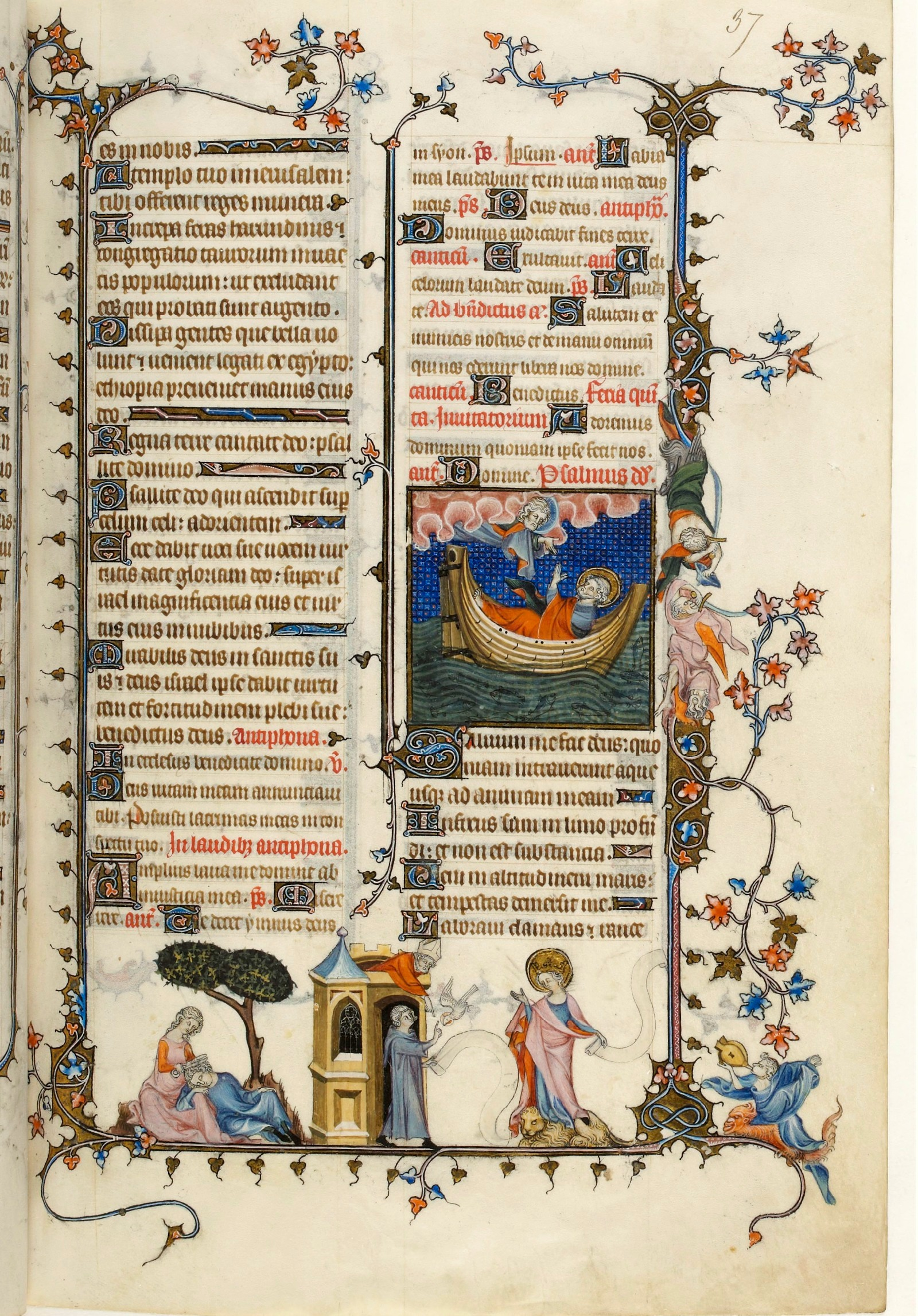
  Detail of the Belleville Breviary, 1323–26 kept at the Bibliothèque Nationale, Paris. (MS. Lat. 10484, folio 37 recto)
- The Treaty of Westminster of 1353, although the original document is lost, some details are known, such as a very particular clause stating that "The titles of property in Brittany are to be restored as they were before the war. If Englishmen are married to Breton Heiresses they must not be disturbed in their rights, and an amnesty is to be granted to all adherents of Montfort."
- Great Chronicles of France, t.5, of John (II) the Good to Charles (V) the Wise (1350/1380);
- Latin chronicle of Guillaume de Nangis and his continuations, (1317/1368);
- Chronicle of the first four Valois, (1327/1393)
- Chronicon, (1328/1364)
- Chronicles of the reigns of John II and Charles V, t1 (1350/1364)
- Norman Chronicle of the 14th Century
- Chronicles of Mont-Saint-Michel, t.1 (1343/1432)

== Legacy ==
The Belleville lands were part of a lawsuit when her daughter Louise from her first marriage attempted to prohibit the King from redistributing the family's lands following their confiscation and another lawsuit from Louise's widower who also attempted to prevent this.

In 1868, French-Breton writer Émile Pehant's novel Jeanne de Belleville was published in France. Written at the height of the French romantic movement, Pehant's novel shares many details with the legend attached to Jeanne.

On 24 September 1999, the City Council of Nantes named a street Rue Jeanne la corsaire in honour of Jeanne: "A route beginning in the Embellie street is to be named: Rue Jeanne la Corsaire, wife of Olivier de Clisson, 1300–1359." Another street also bears her name: Rue Jeanne de Belleville, in La Bernerie-en-Retz, in the Rogère district.

The 1969 Russian children's novel "My Grandfather is a Monument" by Vasily Aksyonov features a villain, Madame Nakamura-Branchevska, who claims to be a descendant of Jeanne de Clisson and keeps a portrait of her on the wall of her study.

== See also ==
- Belleville Breviary, a book of prayers.
- Cog (ship), prevalent merchant ship type of the era sometimes converted for warfare.
- John Crabbe (died 1352), a contemporary Flemish pirate in the employ of the Scottish and subsequently the English.
- John Hawley (died 1408), a contemporary pirate also in the employ of the English.
- Grace O'Malley, an Irish pirate and land owner died ca. 1603, 240 years later.
- Luis de la Cerda, Franco-Castilian Admiral of France involved in several contemporary engagements around the coast of Brittany.
- Walter Manny, 1st Baron Manny, English Admiral that relieved Hennebont, involved in several contemporary engagements around the coast of Brittany.
