= Amaury de Clisson =

Breton and knight, emissary to King Edward III

- Breton Knight and Emissary to England
- Coat of Arms Clisson Cadet Family
- Full name: Amaury de Clisson
- Born: around 1304; Château de Clisson, Brittany
- Died: 2 August 1347; Battle of La Roche-Derrien
- Noble family: de Clisson
- Spouse: Isabeau de Ramefort
- Issue: Amaury II de Clisson, Isabeau de Clisson, Mahaut de Clisson
- Father: Olivier III de Clisson
- Mother: Isabelle de Craon

Amaury de Clisson (1304–1347), was a Breton knight who became the chief emissary for Jeanne de Penthièvre to the court of Edward III of England.

He was the brother of Garnier de Clisson, defender of Brest against John of Montfort and another brother, Olivier IV de Clisson who became embroiled in the intrigue of the Siege of Vannes and was subsequently executed by the King of France for perceived treason.

== Marriage ==
Amaury married Isabeau de Ramefort, Dame of Ramefort and Mortiercrolles, probably celebrated in Angers in 1333. Together their lands included Blandinais, Avrille and Ramfort.They had three children:

- Amaury II, who died with no issue;
- Isabeau, who after the death of her brother, married in 1354 to Renaud d'Ancenis. By 8 March 1383, Isabeau had lost her husband; and
- Mahaut, who married Guy de Bauçay.

== During the Breton War of Succession ==
During the Breton War of Succession, Amaury de Clisson with his brothers initially all sided with the French choice for the empty Breton ducal crown, Charles de Blois against the English choice, John de Montfort. Amaury was assigned to protect Jugon but was captured by the Montfortists. It is apparently at this time that he switched sides. As a result of his new prominence in the Montfortist camp, his lands in French controlled Brittany were confiscated in October 1344 and given to William the Binder.

=== Regent of Brittany ===
Afture the capture of John de Montfort, Amaury was appointed regent of Brittany and tutor to the young Duke.

=== Emissary to England ===
De Clisson concluded an agreement on behalf of the Montfortists on 10 March 1342, in Westminster with Edward III of England and returned to Brittany with 6,000 archers saving the de Montforts who at this stage were besieged at the port city of Hennebont.

=== Defender of Hennebont ===
De Clisson remained the main Breton commander at Hennebont against the Franco-Breton siege of the city. Chroniclers, state that two captured Breton knights were to be killed by Luis de la Cerda at the base of the city's rampart. The Anglo-Breton defenders apparently had spies in the Franco-Breton camp and became aware of the situation, resolving to try everything to snatch them back. While de Clisson simulated a distraction to attract the attention of the besiegers, the English co-commander Walter de Mauny diverted around the walls and recaptured the two knights returning with them.

=== Battle of La Roche-Derrien ===
De Clisson was involved and apparently killed in the Battle of La Roche-Derrien which was fought on 20 June 1347 during the night between Anglo-Breton and Franco-Breton forces. Approximately 4,000–5,000 French, Breton and Genoese mercenaries laid siege to the town of La Roche-Derrien in the hope of luring the Anglo-Bretons into an open pitched battle.

== See also ==
- Jean de Beaumanoir, opposing co-commander in the army of Charles de Blois.
- Jeanne de Clisson, his sister in law
- Joan, Duchess of Brittany, also known as Jeanne de Penthièvre.
- John IV, Duke of Brittany, son of Jean de Montfort and Jeanne de Flandre.
- Olivier IV de Clisson, his brother
- Philip VI of France
