= Heretic (novel) =

2003 historical novel by Bernard Cornwell

- First edition
- Author: Bernard Cornwell
- Language: English
- Series: The Grail Quest series
- Genre: Historical novel
- Publisher: HarperCollins
- Publication date: 6 October 2003
- Publication place: United Kingdom
- Media type: Print (hardcover and paperback), audiobook, and e-book
- Pages: 336 (first edition hardback)
- ISBN: 978-0007149889 (first edition hardback)
- Preceded by: Vagabond
- Followed by: 1356

Heretic is the third novel in The Grail Quest series by English author Bernard Cornwell, first published in 2003. Set during the first stage of the Hundred Years' War, the novel follows Thomas of Hookton's quest to find the Holy Grail, a relic which may grant decisive victory to the possessor.

== Plot summary ==
In 1347, Calais surrenders to the English after a long siege. Thomas of Hookton is then ordered by his master, William Bohun, Earl of Northampton, to leave before a truce is negotiated and capture Castillon d'Arbazon, a castle the earl once possessed in French-controlled Gascony. The earl and the English king want the most sacred relic in Christendom, the Holy Grail. They believe that Guy Vexille, Thomas's cousin and enemy, may know something about its whereabouts, and news of Thomas's taking of the castle will entice the man within reach for Thomas to try to capture him for interrogation.

Through subterfuge, Thomas is able to seize the fortress from its lax garrison. There he meets Genevieve, a blonde young woman about to be burned at the stake for being a beghard. Thomas cannot bring himself to allow her execution, both because she is beautiful and because she, like him, was tortured by a Dominican priest, in her case Father Roubard. However the decision costs Thomas dearly. It brings about the end of his friendship with the Scot Robbie, for Robbie is also entranced by Genevieve's beauty. Robbie's envy quickly turns to hatred for both Thomas and Genevieve, and he sows dissent among Thomas's small band. When Roubard comes to speak with Thomas, Genevieve fatally shoots him with a bow. Thomas is soon excommunicated for protecting Genevieve.

Guy Vexille does indeed come, as he in turn suspects that Thomas can reveal more about the Grail's hiding place. He is supposedly working for the ambitious French Cardinal Louis Bessières, as is the cardinal's murderous brother and henchman, Charles, but Vexille is only pretending. The aged and bookish Count of Berat, in whose domain the castle is located, also seeks the Grail. After ambushing a band of men-at-arms, Thomas and his men capture their leader, Joscelyn, the count's nephew and heir. Sir Guillaume reluctantly allows Joscelyn to leave to persuade his miserly uncle to pay his ransom. Robbie and some of the English soldiers escort Joscelyn, but Robbie soon pledges his allegiance to Joscelyn, who becomes Count of Berat by having two of his men murder his uncle. Joscelyn sends Thomas a mocking message, telling him to come and collect his ransom.

Realising his excommunication has lost him the support of many of his men, Thomas departs with Genevieve, leaving his friend Sir Guillaume in charge. Thomas and Genevieve tangle with a band of coredors (bandits). He kills some of them with his bow, but she is badly wounded. Philin, the leader of the band, lets him go in exchange for not killing his wounded son, Galdric. He and Thomas take their wounded loved ones to Abbot Planchard, head of a nearby monastery. He sees to it they are cared for. Planchard guesses why Thomas is in the region and shows him a small, old wood box made for the Vexilles; it is said to have held the Holy Grail, but it is now empty. Later, Guy Vexille comes and talks with Planchard, seeking information about the Grail; Planchard's grandfather was one of the seven dark lords, heretic Cathar leaders, as was Guy Vexille's ancestor. After Planchard tells him he does not know anything useful, he kills the abbot.

With Guy Vexille and Charles Bessières searching for him, Thomas has no choice but to try to return to Castillon d'Arbazon. He and Genevieve are captured by coredors, the larger band of which Philin's men are a part. Just as they are about to cut off his fingers, they are attacked by Bessières' horsemen (who are unaware of Thomas's identity or presence there). Thomas escapes and is followed by Philin, Galdric and some of the other coredors.

They find Castillon d'Arbazon under siege by Joscelyn's men. Guy Vexille and Charles Bessières arrive and reinforce Joscelyn. Thomas manages to force his way back into the castle, killing Bessières in the process. From the corpse, Thomas takes a beautiful gold goblet and a green glass cup created in secret for the cardinal (the glass cup to be "found", proclaimed the Holy Grail if the real one cannot be located, and used to help make him the next pope). Thomas's men welcome him back, but they are still hopelessly outnumbered, and Joscelyn has brought a cannon to break down the gate and walls. However, the plague breaks out and kills many, civilian and soldier alike. Joscelyn flees the sickness, but Guy Vexille gathers all the healthy soldiers who have stayed and launches an assault. Thomas wins the battle and kills his cousin with arrows.

Thomas forgives an apologetic Robbie. Robbie, Sir Guillaume, Philin and Galdric catch the plague; only Robbie and Galdric survive. While the Scot and the wounded recover, Thomas teaches Genevieve to read using his father's Bible. While doing so, he discovers a subtle misquotation that tells him where his father hid the Grail. Back in the remains of Thomas's village of Hookton, he finds a crude clay bowl his father had used to hold the communion wafers. Thomas himself had come upon the bowl after the sack of Hookton, and thrown it away as worthless, but it fits inside the Vexille box perfectly. He pours wine into the bowl and he and Genevieve each take a drink, reasoning that if that does not remove the taint of excommunication, nothing will.

Thomas had previously harbored romantic hopes that finding the Grail would bring peace to the whole world, but he has seen enough to know that revealing the Grail's existence would only cause more death and destruction. So he flings it into the ocean, swearing both Genevieve and himself to secrecy.

== Characters ==
- Thomas of Hookton - the protagonist, illegitimate son of a priest and English archer
- Robbie Douglas - captured Scottish noble, Thomas's friend
- Guy Vexille, Comte d'Astarac - Thomas's cousin, his father's murderer and the antagonist
- Sir Guillaume d'Evecque - French knight who fights for Thomas, also father of Thomas's previous lover Eleanor
- Joscelyn - a French noble
- William Bohun - English commander and Thomas's lord
- Cardinal Louis Bessières - corrupt, ambitious French cardinal and Papal Legate to the French court
- Charles Bessières - Louis's murderous younger brother and henchman
- Genevieve - a woman from Picardy condemned to die for witchcraft, later Thomas's lover
- Abbot Planchard - a kindly man who follows his conscience
- Philin - a bandit, formerly one of Planchard's novice monks
- Galdric - Philin's 10- or 11-year old son
