= Vagabond (novel) =

2002 historical novel by Bernard Cornwell

- First edition
- Author: Bernard Cornwell
- Language: English
- Series: The Grail Quest series
- Genre: Historical novel
- Publisher: HarperCollins
- Publication date: 7 October 2002
- Publication place: United Kingdom
- Media type: Print (hardcover and paperback), audiobook, and e-book
- Pages: 384 pp ( first edition hardback)
- ISBN: 978-0-00-22596-6-8 (first edition, hardback)
- Preceded by: Harlequin
- Followed by: Heretic

Vagabond is the second novel in The Grail Quest series by English author Bernard Cornwell, first published in 2002. Set during the first stage of the Hundred Years' War, it follows Thomas of Hookton's quest to find the Holy Grail, a relic which will grant decisive victory to the possessor.

== Plot summary ==
Thomas, Eleanor and Father Hobbe journey to the city of Durham in northern England to speak with an old monk, Brother Collimore, who took care of Father Ralph (Thomas's father) while he was mad; Father Ralph may have talked about the location of the Holy Grail then. Unknown to them, the ambitious French Cardinal Bessières has dispatched Bernard de Taillebourg there also to find the Holy Grail. He is accompanied by Guy Vexille, the murderer of Father Ralph as well as Thomas's cousin. Nearing Durham, Thomas is caught up in a Scottish raid taking advantage of the main English forces being away fighting in France. Thomas participates in the Battle of Neville's Cross, despite Eleanor's disapproval in which Cornwall mistakes the Scottish banners and incorrectly says that Robert Stewart, later King Robert II of Scotland, took part in the battle. Eleanor is pregnant with Thomas's baby. Thomas sends Eleanor and Father Hobbe to supposed safety in Durham to question Brother Collimore. However, Tailleborg and Vexille are already there interrogating the monk. Vexille kills Father Hobbe, while Eleanor is tortured for information before being murdered along with Brother Collimore. Meanwhile, the Scots lose the battle and David II, their king, is captured. Thomas is devastated when he finds out about Eleanor's death. He returns to Hookton with Robbie Douglas, a captured Scottish noble who also bears a grudge against Guy Vexille.

In Hookton, Sir Giles Marriott, Father Ralph's old friend, gives Thomas a book that his father wrote which may contain encrypted information about the Grail. A French priest brings word from Sir Guillaume asking for Thomas's help; he has been outlawed (because of his actions in the Battle of Crécy) and his castle is under siege.

Thomas and Robbie go to Sir Guillaume's aid. Thomas uses his cunning to ambush small French parties and blow up the stock of gunpowder for the French cannon. Sir Guillaume sends them a message, asking them to arrange for a ship to take him and some of his men to Calais, which is being besieged by the English. Sir Guillaume and his people escape at night and sail to Calais. Later, Thomas travels back to La Roche-Derrien, where he finds his old flame, Jeanette. Jeanette fled the Battle of Crécy, mistakenly thinking (as did everyone else) that the French would prevail, and thus no longer has the Prince of Wales' favour.

Thomas sets out with a small raiding party to retrieve her son, fostered out to be raised by the Lord of Roncelets. However, he is betrayed by some of his own recently recruited men and ends up the Dominican's prisoner. He is tortured for information and eventually breaks, telling most of what he knows. Eventually Thomas is ransomed for his father's book and returned to his friends; Mordecai starts his rehabilitation.

Meanwhile, Charles of Blois, Duke of Brittany, amasses a large army and lays siege to La Roche-Derrien. He hopes to lure the sole, much smaller English army in the region, commanded by Sir Thomas Dagworth, out. With Dagworth's men eliminated, the only English forces remaining would be isolated garrisons. Charles has four fortified camps built, one before each of the city's gates, and gives his subordinates strict orders to remain inside their particular fortification until he gives the signal. The deadly English archers will have to attack a well-protected enemy. It works at first; Dagworth is drawn into a deadly ambush when he launches a night attack on the largest of the fortifications, the one under the command of Charles, and his men suffer heavy casualties. However, just when all seems lost, the garrison sorties and takes the French by surprise, routing them and eventually winning the Battle of La Roche-Derrien. De Taillebourg is slain by Thomas and Robbie. They also capture the Lord of Roncelets; not only will Thomas and his friends become rich from the ransom, but Jeanette will have the leverage to get her son back. Sir Guillaume is even more delighted with his captive, his former liege lord, the Count of Coutances, who turned on him. The victory comes at a terrible cost to Thomas, though; his former commander and good friend, the crippled Sir William Skeat, is murdered by Sir Geoffrey Carr, an enemy Thomas made during his time in Durham. Carr is killed by Jeanette, Thomas and Robbie.

Thomas decides to continue searching for the Grail.

== Characters ==
- Thomas of Hookton
- Robbie Douglas - a captured Scottish noble, Thomas's companion
- Sir Will Skeat - Thomas's friend and former captain in the service of the Earl of Northampton until he was badly wounded at Crécy
- Guy Vexille, Comte d'Astarac - Thomas's cousin, his father's murderer and the main antagonist
- Sir Guillaume d'Evecque - a French knight who, being outlawed, has no choice but to fight for the English
- Jeanette - the daughter of a rich Breton merchant, widow of the Count of Armorica, Thomas's former lover
- Sir Geoffrey Carr - an impoverished English knight and enemy of Thomas
- Sir William Douglas - uncle of Robbie Douglas, captured at the Battle of Neville's Cross by Lord Outhwaite
- Bernard de Taillebourg - an ambitious Dominican inquisitor seeking the Holy Grail
- Mordecai - a Jewish doctor and surgeon
- Lord Outhwaite - the English commander at the Battle of Neville's Cross
- Sir Thomas Dagworth - the commander of the only English army in Brittany
- Cardinal Bessières - a corrupt French cardinal who aspires to become Pope
- Charles of Blois, Duke of Brittany - a nephew of the French king
- King David II - King of Scotland, captured at the Battle of Neville's Cross

== Reception ==
Kirkus Reviews gave a positive review to the novel, calling it "wildly entertaining".
