= 1356 (disambiguation) =

1356 is a year.

1356 may also refer to:

- 1356 SH, a year in the Solar Hijri calendar corresponding to 21 March 1977 – 20 March 1978 in the Gregorian calendar
- 1356 (novel), a novel in the Grail Quest series by Bernard Cornwell
