= Walter Bentley =

Walter Bentley may refer to:

- W. O. Bentley (Walter Owen Bentley, 1889–1971), founder of Bentley Motors
- Walter Bentley (died 1359), English captain at the 1352 Battle of Mauron
- Walter Bentley (actor) (1849–1927), Scottish-Australian Shakespearean actor
