= Walter Bentley (died 1359) =

English knight

Sir Walter Bentley
- English Knight
- Blason of Sir Walter Bentley
- Born: circa 1310; Yorkshire, England
- Died: December 1359; Hennebont, Brittany
- Spouse: Jeanne de Clisson (Lioness of Brittany)
- Father: Sir John Bentley

Sir Walter Bentley (died 1359) was an English knight who fought during the Hundred Years' War.

== Life ==
Bentley was a son of Sir John Bentley, of Yorkshire, and may have been born in or around Beverley, Yorkshire.

=== Second War of Scottish Independence. ===
Bentley is known to have fought during the early stages of the Second War of Scottish Independence.

=== Hundred Years' War ===
Bentley served as King Edward III of England's sergeant in France during 1339.

As part of William de Bohun, Earl of Northampton's retinue, Bentley served in Brittany in 1342. Forming his own mercenary band, he had control of Tristan and a number of castles in western Brittany.

Bentley held many lands in England, as well as in Brittany and France such as: Beauvoir-sur-Mer, Ampant, Barre, Blaye, Chateauneuf, Villemaine, the Île-Chauvet and islands of Noirmoutier and Bouin.

Bentley, to control excessive pillaging by his men in the countryside used a process of restauro equorum, sought a third of the profits of his men, in receipt of the Kings pay who were serving without the benefit of appraised war assets such as horses etc.

==== Lieutenant of Brittany and the Feud with Caours ====
Bentley became involved in a feud with Raoul de Caours, the English lieutenant of Bas-Poitou, over the possession of Jeanne de Clisson's castles that Caours had seized from the French. To prevent a private war between Bentley and Caours, Edward III ordered them to accept his arbitration and in October 1349, Edward III returned these castles to Bentley. As a result, Caours defected to the French. Caours is also said to have subsequently arranged an ambush of the then English Lieutenant of Brittany, Sir Thomas Dagworth in 1350.

Bentley was subsequently appointed as the King's Lieutenant of Brittany on 8 September 1350, as the successor of Thomas Dagworth.

During June 1351, a French army laid siege to the town of Ploërmel, Bentley was able to relieve the town, raiding into Maine and along the Loire Valley.

While Bentley was in England, a French army under Guy II de Nesle, raided into Brittany. Returning to Brittany, Walter raised an English-Breton army and defeated Guy II during the battle of Mauron. Many French nobles were captured. Bentley was also severely injured during the battle. He was dismissed as the King's Lieutenant in early 1353.

==== The treaty with the new Duke ====
Later that same year, Edward III ordered Bentley to surrender his wife's castles, part of a treaty with Charles, Duke of Brittany. Bentley refused to hand over the castle and travelled to England to plead his case, before Edward III. Walter was imprisoned in the Tower of London, while his case was heard. Eventually he was released and allowed to return after a period of having to stay in England. In January 1357, he and his wife were granted the barony of La Roche-Moisan.

=== Death ===
Bentley died in December 1359 in Hennebont, his wife, Jeanne, a few weeks later.

== Marriage ==
Bentley married Jeanne, the widow of Geoffrey de Châteaubriant VIII, Guy of Penthièvre and Olivier IV de Clisson, she was the daughter of Maurice IV Montaigu of Belleville and Palluau and Létice de Parthenay, they had no issue.

== Note ==
Some French records use the French term Gautier, to refer to Walter Bentley.
