= Guy II de Nesle =

Guy II de Nesle (died 14 August 1352), Lord of Mello, was a Marshal of France (1348) who was killed in the Battle of Mauron.

== Life ==
Guy was the son of Jean I de Nesle (died 1352), Lord of Offemont, and Margaret de Mello. He was the grandson of Guy I of Clermont, who was killed in the Battle of the Golden Spurs (1302).

Nesle was made a Marshal of France in 1348 by King Philip VI of France and was commander of the army in Artois, Bourbonnais and Flanders during the Hundred Years' War. He was captured in 1351 by the English during the Siege of Saint-Jean-d'Angély, but released after paying a ransom.

In 1352, Nesle was co-founder, with King John II of France, of the newly created Order of the Star. In August of that same year, Nesle led a contingent of some hundred Knights of the Order into Brittany. There, near Mauron, they were surprised by a numerically superior English force. Guy's force, though able to force the English line back, were beaten and Guy was killed, along the bulk of knights from the Order of the Star.

== Marriage and issue ==
Guy de Nesle married Jeanne de Bruyères. They had:

- Jean II de Nesle, married Ade de Mailly-Acheu

Guy later married I. de Thouars.

== Sources ==
- Bennett, Michael (1999). "The Development of Battle Tactics in the Hundred Years War". In Curry, Anne; Hughes, Michael (eds.). Arms, Armies and Fortifications in the Hundred Years War. The Boydell Press. pp. 1–20. ISBN 9780851157559.
- Graham-Goering, Erika (2020). Princely Power in Late Medieval France: Jeanne de Penthièvre and the War for Brittany. Cambridge University Press. ISBN 9781108805544.
- James, Montague Rhodes (1912). A Descriptive Catalogue of the Mclean Collection of Manuscripts in the Fitzwilliam Museum. Cambridge University Press.
- Sumption, Jonathan (1999). The Hundred Years War, Volume 2: Trial by Fire. University of Pennsylvania Press. ISBN 0-8122-1655-5.
