= Olivier III de Clisson =

Breton nobleman and knight

Olivier de Clisson, Olivier III de Clisson,
- Breton Lord and Knight
- Coat of Arms Clisson Family
- Born: 1280; Château de Clisson, Brittany
- Died: 1320 (aged 39–40)
- Noble family: de Clisson
- Spouse: Isabeau de Craon
- Issue: Olivier IV de Clisson (Breton Lord); Amaury de Clisson; Garnier de Clisson
- Father: Olivier II de Clisson (Breton Lord)
- Mother: Alienor des Roches

Olivier III de Clisson (1280–1320), was a Breton Marche Lord and knight.

== Lord of Southern Brittany ==
Olivier III continued expanding the de Clisson influence outside Brittany and in 1299, married Isabeau de Craon (1278 - July 30, 1350), daughter of Maurice VI de Craon. The Lords of Craon were mainly Norman with a history as former adversaries of the Dukes of Brittany.

This Olivier III was now also son and heir of Jeanne Bertran, lady of Tuit, eldest daughter of Guillaume Bertran, lord of Tuit and Thury, a rich Norman heritage.

Olivier III and Isabeau would eventually have five children:

- Olivier IV de Clisson in 1300;
- Amaury de Clisson, lord of Blandinais;
- Mahaut de Clisson, Dame des Earts;
- Gauthier (Garnier) de Clisson and
- Isabelle de Clisson
