= The Grail Quest =

Series of historical novels by Bernard Cornwell

- First volume Harlequin first edition cover
- Author: Bernard Cornwell
- Country: England
- Language: English
- Publisher: HarperCollins
- No. of books: 4

The Grail Quest is a historical fiction novel series written by Bernard Cornwell dealing with a 14th-century search for the Holy Grail, set during the opening stage of the Hundred Years' War.

== Books ==
- Harlequin (2000, published in the United States under the title The Archer's Tale)
- Vagabond (2002)
- Heretic (2003)
- 1356 (2012)

== Overview ==
The fictional Thomas of Hookton leaves his native Dorset after the murder of his father by Thomas's own cousin and joins an English army under Edward III as an archer. In Harlequin, he is involved in the fighting in Brittany and subsequently at the Battle of Crécy. The battle is a decisive victory for the English, despite being seriously outnumbered. In Vagabond, he returns to England to try to uncover the Grail's whereabouts and helps defeat the Scottish invasion of 1347. He discovers that his cousin, Guy Vexille, is working with an ambitious French cardinal to obtain the Grail for their own ends. Thomas returns to Brittany to come to the aid of a friend and fights in the Battle of La Roche-Derrien. Heretic finds Thomas still in France, this time during a time of supposed peace with the French following the fall of Calais. Thomas leads a small band of men into southern France to find the Grail. He is trapped in a castle he had captured, but an outbreak of the Black Death causes many of his besiegers to flee, and Thomas fights his cousin on more even terms and kills him. Afterward, Thomas discovers a clue his father left him, which leads him to the Grail.

Years later, Thomas achieves his ambition: to raise and lead a mercenary force. However, his liege lord hears stories about la Malice, the sword used by Peter to defend Jesus in the Garden of Gethsemane, and about its powers, so once again Thomas is ordered to find another holy relic. During his search, he fights in the Battle of Poitiers.

== Aftermath ==
Thomas of Hookton is later briefly mentioned in Cornwell's novel Azincourt, set around the events leading up to the Battle of Agincourt in 1415 as having "died as a lord of a thousand acres."

== See also ==
- Saint Guinefort
