= Battle of Mauron =

1352 battle of the Breton War of Succession

- Part of the Breton War of Succession
Date	14 August 1352
Location	Mauron, Brittany (Present-day France)
Result	Anglo-Breton victory

Belligerents
House of Montfort, Brittany; Kingdom of England	House of Blois, Brittany; Kingdom of France

Commanders and leaders
Sir Walter Bentley; Tanguy I du Chastel	Guy II de Nesle †; Jean de Beaumanoir; Alain de Tinténiac †; Jean de Rieux; Alain VII de Rohan

Strength
2,000	5,000

Casualties and losses
600–700 killed	800–900 killed

The Battle of Mauron was fought in 1352 in Brittany during the Breton War of Succession between an Anglo-Breton force supporting the claim of Jean de Montfort and a Franco-Breton force supporting the claim of Charles de Blois. The Anglo-Bretons were victorious. The battle took place in the context of the Hundred Years War.

== Prelude ==
In 1352 a French army, commanded by Marshal Guy II de Nesle, invaded Brittany, and after recapturing Rennes and territories to the south was advancing northwest, towards the town of Brest. Under orders from the French King Jean II of France to retake the castle of Ploërmel from the Anglo-Breton garrison who occupied it, de Nesle made his way towards Ploërmel. Faced with this threat, the English captain Walter Bentley and the Breton captain Tanguy I du Chastel assembled troops to ride out and meet the Franco-Breton forces on 14 August 1352. The two armies met at a place called Brambily (currently the town of Saint-Léry) near Mauron castle.

== Forces ==
=== Anglo-Breton army ===
2,000 men commanded by the Englishman Sir Walter Bentley and the Breton captain Tanguy I du Chastel. (Sir Walter had succeeded Sir Thomas Dagworth, the former keeper of Brittany who had been killed in a French ambush).

=== Franco-Breton army ===
The other army comprised 5,000 men under the command of the French marshal Guy II de Nesle and the Breton captain Jehan de Beaumanoir.

== Battle ==
With only a minute force, Sir Walter took up one of those strong defensive positions favoured by the English of the time, with men-at-arms on foot in a line, with archers in the customary "wedge" (one interpretation of Froissart's enigmatic word 'herce' which more probably means in a 'zig-zag' rather than wedge-shaped deployment) formation on the wings.

The Franco-Breton forces attacked late in the afternoon and the English longbowmen inflicted mass carnage on the French horses, their dismounted riders being dispatched by the men-at-arms as they struggled to get to their feet under the weight of their armour. Although pushed back on their right, the Anglo-Bretons, under the command of Sir Robert Knollys, later a notorious commander of routiers, stood with their back to a belt of trees and put up such a fight that the French were routed.

The French leader, Guy II de Nesle, was amongst the slain, and at least six hundred French knights and nobles were taken prisoner, vastly enriching the victors. The battle gave the English further control of Brittany.

== Aftermath ==
The battle was very violent and severe losses occurred on both sides: 800 of the Franco-Breton side and 600 on the Anglo-Breton. It was especially serious for the Breton aristocracy supporting the party of Charles de Blois. Guy II de Nesle and the hero of the Battle of the Thirty, Alain de Tinténiac, were slain. More than eighty knights of the recently formed chivalric Order of the Star also lost their lives, possibly partly because of the oath of the order never to retreat in battle.

== Sources ==
- Kaeuper, Richard W.; Kennedy, Elspeth (1996). The Book of Chivalry of Geoffroi de Charny: Text, Context and Translation. Philadelphia: University of Pennsylvania Press. ISBN 9780812215793. "calais."
- Sumption, Jonathan (1999). The Hundred Years War, Volume 2: Trial by Fire. University of Pennsylvania Press.
- Wagner, John A. (2006). Encyclopedia of the Hundred Years War. Greenwood Press. p. 212. ISBN 9780313327360.
