= Guy de Penthièvre =

French noble (1287–1331)

- Breton Lord
- Born: 1287; Chaillot
- Died: 1331 (aged 43–44)
- Noble family: Capetian House of Dreux
- Spouses: Jeanne d'Avaugour; Jeanne de Belleville (Lioness of Brittany)
- Issue: Jeanne de Penthièvre
- Father: Arthur II of Brittany
- Mother: Marie of Limoges

Guy de Bretagne de Penthièvre or Guy VII de Limoges (1287 – March 27, 1331), was Viscount of Limoges from 1314 to 1317 and Count of Penthièvre from 1317 to 1331.

== Life ==
Guy was born in Chaillot, the second son of the Duke of Brittany Arthur II and Marie, Viscountess of Limoges.

=== Dispute with the Breton Duke ===
Guy's brother Duke John III of Brittany married Isabella of Castile, and as a marriage gift, gave her the viscounty of Limoges. Guy refused to ratify the gift of this property, inherited from their mother, to which he himself had rights. After several years of marriage, while Isabelle remained childless, Duke John III invested his brother in March 1314 with the contested viscounty. Isabelle protested to the Pope, who by a bull on 1 September 1314 invited the Duke to restore her domain. She recovered the viscounty in 1317. John III in turn compensated his brother with the county of Penthièvre.

=== First marriage ===
In 1318, Guy married Jeanne d'Avaugour (1300–1327), lady of Goëlo, daughter of Henri, Lord of Avaugour, with whom he had one daughter:

- Jeanne (1319–1384), countess de Penthièvre, then duchess of Brittany, married in 1337 to Charles de Blois-Châtillon (1319–1364)

By uniting his own domains with those of his wife in Goëlo, Guy consolidated a significant political power in northern Brittany.

=== Second marriage ===
By 1327, Guy was a widower. He married Jeanne de Belleville, but following a complaint by his family and a resultant investigation carried out beginning February 10, 1330, by the bishops of Vannes and Rennes, the marriage was annulled by Pope John XXII in 1330.

=== Third betrothal ===
On February 12, 1331, the pope authorized Guy to marry "during Lent" Marie de Blois, niece of Philip VI of France. Guy died suddenly on Tuesday March 26, 1331, without remarrying. His rights passed to his daughter Jeanne de Penthièvre.

He was buried in the Cordeliers' church in Guingamp, the necropolis of his wife's family.

== Sources ==
- Morvan, Frederic (2009). La Chevalerie bretonne et la formation de l'armee ducale, 1260-1341 (in French). Presses Universitaires de Rennes.
