= Harlequin (Cornwell novel) =

2000 historical novel by Bernard Cornwell

- First edition cover
- Author: Bernard Cornwell
- Language: English
- Series: The Grail Quest series
- Genre: Historical novel
- Publisher: HarperCollins
- Publication date: 16 October 2000
- Publication place: United Kingdom
- Media type: Print (Hardback & Paperback)
- Pages: 384 pp (first edition, hardback)
- ISBN: 978-0-00-225965-1 (first edition, hardback)
- OCLC: 222757152
- Followed by: Vagabond

Harlequin (in the USA The Archer's Tale) is the first novel in The Grail Quest series by English author Bernard Cornwell, first published in 2000. The story takes place in the mid-14th century, during the Hundred Years' War.

== Plot summary ==
Thomas grows up in the village of Hookton in Dorset, the illegitimate son of village priest Father Ralph. Thomas, a young man, has been training secretly with a bow, despite his father forbidding it. On Easter morning, 1343, Norman raiders led by French knight Sir Guillaume d'Evecque arrive. A mysterious man calling himself the Harlequin has hired them to steal a lance that Thomas's father claims is the one used by Saint George to slay a dragon. The Harlequin mortally stabs Thomas's father. Thomas kills four men, but the rest leave with the lance and captives. Thomas learns from his dying father that he is a French count who fled his evil family and that the Harlequin is Thomas's first cousin.

Three years pass. Thomas is in France with the English army, serving under Will Skeat, a successful mercenary leader. The English, commanded by William Bohun, Earl of Northampton, besiege the small city of La Roche-Derrien. However, a half dozen assaults have failed. Among the defenders is a beautiful woman who fights with a crossbow: Jeanette, the widowed Countess of Armorica. She inflicts a minor wound on an impoverished, ambitious English knight, Sir Simon Jekyll, and Jekyll vows revenge.

Skeat persuades the earl to try a new plan. Thomas has discovered a weak spot. The earl lets Thomas lead an assault. Things go awry, but Thomas and his men get into the city anyway and open the gates. Then the murdering, pillaging and raping begin. Jekyll attempts to rape Jeanette, but is stopped by the earl. The earl is obliged to give Jekyll Jeanette's property as spoils of war, but he places Jeanette and her young son under royal protection.

The earl leaves Skeat and his men to garrison the city. They guard Jeanette from Sir Simon, but she remains hostile. A French force based in Lannion under Sir Geoffrey de Pont Blanc presents the only threat, but neither side wants to fight on the other's terms. Jekyll, however, is eager for plunder, so he and his men formally battle Sir Geoffrey's force. After Jekyll loses, Skeat sets a trap, having some of his men pretend to flee in panic; Geoffrey is deceived, and his force is decimated by English longbows. Skeat lets Geoffrey go free, much to Jekyll's fury (at losing a ransom). Thomas tells Jekyll to "go and boil your arse".

Later that night, Thomas is beaten by Jekyll's men and about to have his own arse put into boiling water, but is rescued by Father Hobbe, a friend who constantly reminds him of his vow of revenge. Thomas enlists Jeanette's help to lure Jekyll into an ambush. Thomas kills Jekyll's squire and injures Jekyll, but Jekyll escapes.

Thomas and Jeanette flee to the Duke of Brittany, a close relative of her husband. The duke agrees to take care of her son, but believes lies about Jeanette and rapes her. Jeanette escapes with Thomas. She is severely traumatised, but Thomas nurses her back to health. The two then come upon an English army under King Edward III and his son, the Prince of Wales, which is about to assault the French city of Caen. Jeanette soon becomes the prince's mistress. Owing Thomas for the capture of La Roche-Derrien, the Earl of Northampton pays Jekyll to leave Thomas alone.

Thomas takes part in the successful assault on Caen. During the battle, he recognises the coat of arms of Sir Guillaume and wounds him. He also rescues a young woman named Eleanor from being raped. However, Jekyll sees him and has him hanged.

Half-dead, Thomas is rescued by Eleanor, Sir Guillaume's illegitimate daughter. Sir Guillaume reveals that he kept the lance because he was not paid the balance owed (a monk absconded with it). The Harlequin killed Sir Guillaume's family and severely injured him. Sir Guillaume and Thomas become friends with a common goal: to kill the Harlequin. Thomas is nursed back to health by a Jewish doctor named Mordecai. He learns a great deal about his family from a churchman. His father was a member of the infamous Vexille family - the former counts of Astarac and Cathar heretics. Thomas also learns that the Vexilles are rumoured to possess the Holy Grail.

Jeanette turns the prince against Jekyll, and Jekyll is ordered to leave the army. He joins the French, entering the service of the Harlequin, later revealed to be Guy Vexille, Count of Astarac.

Thomas returns to the English army with Eleanor, who becomes his lover. He rejoins Will Skeat's band and helps the English escape the much larger French army assembled by King Philip VI of France by finding a river ford. The English defeat the French guarding the ford in the Battle of Blanchetaque.

Eventually, however, the English, hungry and tired, are forced to fight the Battle of Crécy. During the epic battle, the English achers, Thomas among them, play a major role; when they run out of arrows, they join the hand-to-hand fighting. Thomas spots the distinctive black lance of St. George, used by Vexille's right-hand man as a standard. The man is killed. When Thomas tries to get the lance, he encounters Jekyll. Jekyll quickly gains the upper hand and is about to dispatch him, but Sir Guillaume kills Jekyll. Sir Guillaume then spots a man he suspects is Guy Vexille, but has to be rescued by Thomas (from the English). Meanwhile, the Prince of Wales is trapped under a fallen horse, with Vexille about to strike, so Thomas grabs the lance of St. George and desperately lunges at him. The ancient lance breaks apart when it strikes Vexille's armour, but it distracts him, giving others time to protect the prince. Vexille severely wounds Skeat in the head before fleeing with the rest of the French. Against everyone's expectations, the English have won a decisive victory.

Afterward, the Earl of Northampton sets Sir Guillaume's ransom: he is to take the unresponsive Skeat to Mordechai in the forlorn hope he can be healed. If he cannot be cured, the earl expects Thomas to take his place next spring.

== Characters in Harlequin ==
- Thomas of Hookton
- Will Skeat - Thomas's friend and leader, a mercenary captain in the service of the Earl of Northampton
- William de Bohun, 1st Earl of Northampton - English nobleman and military commander
- Guy Vexille, Count of Astarac
- Sir Guillaume d'Evecque
- Edward of Woodstock, Prince of Wales - heir to the English throne
- Edward III of England - King of England and father of Edward of Woodstock
- Sir Simon Jekyll
- Jeanette
- Charles of Blois, Duke of Brittany
- Eleanor
- Philip VI of France - King of France
- Ralph Vexille - Thomas's father and Guy's uncle
