= Olivier IV de Clisson =

Breton nobleman and knight (c. 1300–1343)

Olivier IV de Clisson,
- Breton Lord and Knight
- Coat of Arms Clisson Family
- Born: around 1300; Château de Clisson, Brittany
- Died: 2 August 1343; Paris
- Noble family: de Clisson
- Spouses: Blanche de Bouville; Jeanne de Belleville (Lioness of Brittany)
- Issue: Jean de Clisson; Isabeau de Clisson; Maurice de Clisson; Olivier V Guillaume de Clisson; Jeanne de Clisson
- Father: Olivier III de Clisson
- Mother: Isabelle de Craon

Olivier IV de Clisson (c. 1300–1343) was a Breton Marche Lord and knight who became embroiled in the intrigue of Vannes during the War of the Breton Succession and was subsequently executed by the King of France for perceived treason. He was the husband of Jeanne de Clisson, who upon his death mounted a campaign of vengeance by which she became known as the "Lioness of Brittany".

== Lord of the Breton border lands, Vassal of Brittany and France ==
The de Clissons were regional lords of lands in southwestern Brittany and answerable as vassals of the Duke of Brittany. They had also, however, married into families with French lands in Normandy, Maine and Anjou, and therefore were also direct vassals of the King of France. As an example, Olivier IV with his father-in-law the Count de Roucy departed on an expedition with Philip of Valois, a cousin of the King of France, to raise a siege of Genoa in 1320. He must have been considered inexperienced at this stage as he is only cited as a squire in official documents.

=== First marriage ===
In 1320, Olivier married Blanche de Bouville at the Chateau de Clisson, in the presence of Philip of Valois. Blanche was the daughter of Jean IV de Bouville, Lord of Milly (near Paris) and Marguerite de Bomez, Dame de Bommiers, Chateaumeillant and Montfaucon. From this marriage, a son, Jean de Clisson, was born around 1321, who eventually became the next Lord of Milly but died young. Blanche died in 1329 and was buried in the Cordeliers convent in Nantes.

=== Second marriage ===
In 1330, Olivier married again, this time to Jeanne de Belleville, a recent widow of the lord of Chateaubriant who controlled areas in Poitou just south of the Breton border from Beauvoir-sur-Mer in the west to Cheaumur in the southeast of Clisson. Combining their assets made Jeanne and Olivier the seigneurial power in the border region of Brittany. Jeanne and Olivier eventually had five children:

- Isabeau (1325–1343), born out of wedlock five years before Jeanne's marriage to Olivier; she eventually married Jean I de Rieux and was thereby the mother of Jean II de Rieux (died 1343)
- Maurice (1333–1334), in Blain
- Olivier V (1336–1407), his father's successor and a future Constable of France, known as "the Butcher"
- Guillaume (1338–1345), died of exposure
- Jeanne (1340–?), married John Harpeden I, Lord of Montendre IV's successor

== On expedition ==
Olivier was again mentioned in an account of expenses of Philip of Valois from 31 May 1324 to 7 November 1324 for an expedition in Gascony against the English. The author of Grande Chroniques de France mentions that the King of France knighted Olivier IV during this period.

In 1337, Olivier was with Raoul d’Eu, the constable of France, in Gascony and Languedoc on expedition.

In 1338, Olivier was promoted to a knight banneret and was recorded with 7 other knights and 35 squires serving under the King of Bohemia, an ally of the King of France fighting in Gascony.

Olivier also had the confidence of John III, Duke of Brittany, as in March 1341, one of the codicils of his will indicated he was given 300 livres from a property in Nantes.

== During the Breton War of Succession ==
During the Breton War of Succession, Olivier IV and his two brothers sided with the French choice for the vacant Breton ducal crown, Charles de Blois, against the English preference, John de Montfort.

The extended de Clisson family however did not all take the same view. Amaury de Craon, Olivier's cousin, owned land in England and had even been a seneschal for the King of England in Aquitaine from 1313 to 1322.

In January 1342, the de Clisson castle of Blain was chosen as headquarters by Robert Bertrand, the French King's Lieutenant sent to aid Charles de Blois.

Olivier IV's brother, Gauthier (Garnier) de Clisson, died defending Brest whilst his other brother, Amaury de Clisson, was captured defending Jugon; Amaury thereafter switched sides to the de Montfort faction. It was this Amaury who then concluded an agreement with King Edward III of England on 10 March 1342, in Westminster, and returned to Brittany with 6,000 archers, saving the de Montforts besieged at Hennebont.

=== Intrigue of Vannes ===
In November 1342, Olivier IV raised about 12,600 men, in addition to those of Lord Beaumanoir, Marshal of Brittany, and headed towards the captured city of Vannes. Vannes was recaptured by the French-Breton force. In December 1342, another English-Breton force arrived, recapturing the city of Vannes. Olivier IV and Hervé VII de Léon, the military commanders defending this city, were also captured. Olivier was the only one released after an exchange for Ralph de Stafford, 1st Earl of Stafford (a prisoner of the French), and a surprisingly low sum was demanded.

This led Olivier to be subsequently suspected of not having defended the city to his fullest, and was alleged by Charles de Blois to be a traitor.

== Tournament and trial ==
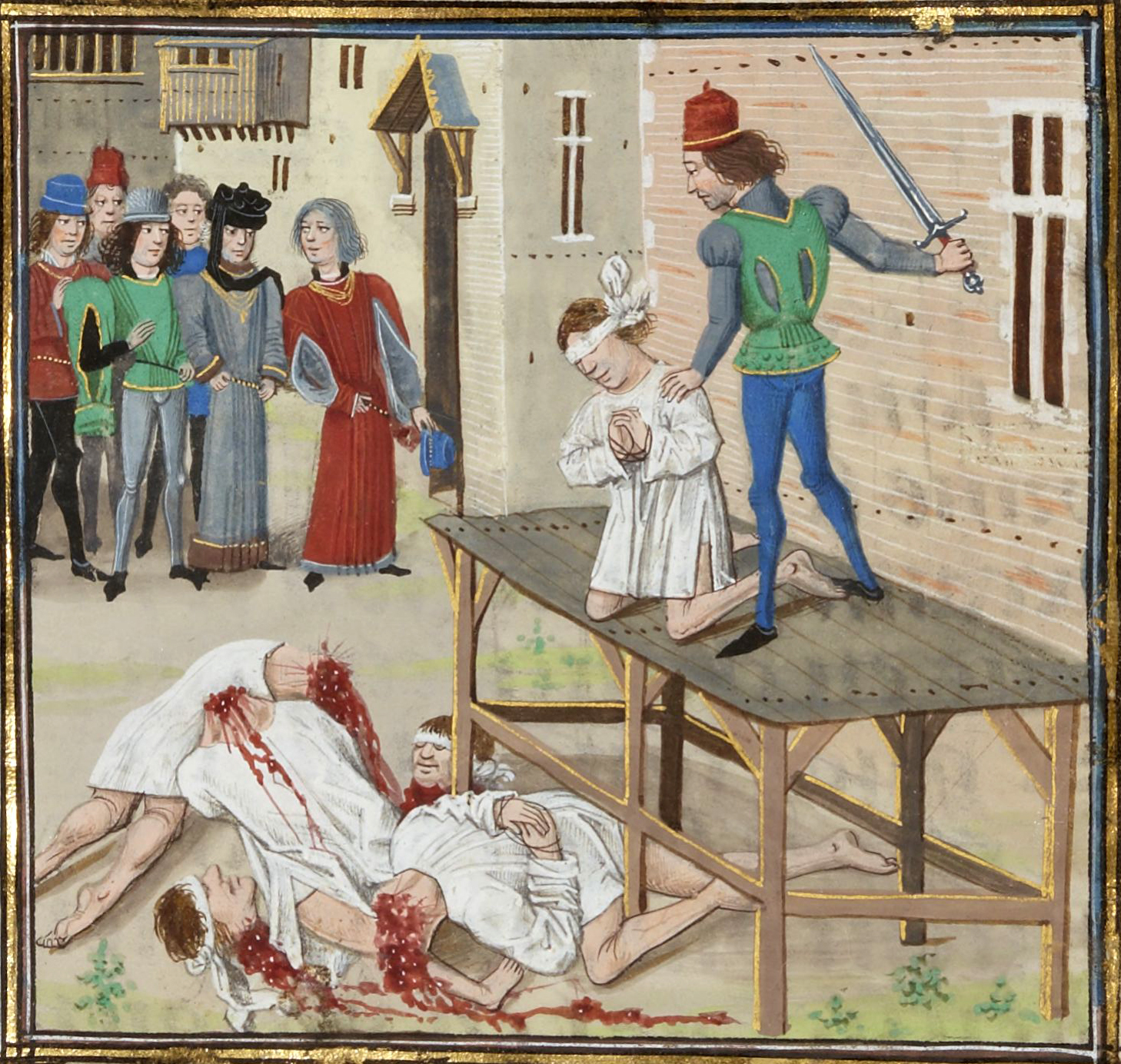
Execution of Olivier IV de Clisson. Painting attributed to Loyset Liédet, Flemish illuminator (v.1420-v.1483) in the Chronicles of Lord Jehan Froissart.

On 19 January 1343, the Truce of Malestroit was signed between England and France. Under the perceived safe conditions of this truce, Olivier and fifteen other Breton lords were invited to a tournament on French soil, where he was subsequently arrested and taken to Paris.

Olivier IV's wife Jeanne tried in vain to have him set free. She seems to have tried to bribe a King's sergeant.

On 2 August 1343, Olivier IV was tried by his peers and executed by beheading at Les Halles.

In the year of our Grace one thousand three hundred and forty-three, on Saturday, the second day of August, Olivier, Lord of Clisson, knight, prisoner in the Chatelet of Paris for several treasons and other crimes perpetrated by him against the king and the crown of France, and for alliances that he made with the king of England, enemy of the king and kingdom of France, as the said Olivier ... has confessed, was by judgement of the king given at Orleans drawn from the Chatelet of Paris to Les Halles ... and there on a scaffold had his head cut off. And then from there his corpse was drawn to the gibbet of Paris and there hanged on the highest level; and his head was sent to Nantes in Brittany to be put on a lance over the Sauvetout gate as a warning to others.

This execution shocked the nobility as the evidence of guilt was not publicly demonstrated, and the process of desecrating/exposing a body was reserved mainly for low-class criminals. This execution was judged harshly by Froissart and his contemporaries.

On 26 August 1343, for her attempted bribery of the Kings sergeant, Jeanne was subsequently sentenced to banishment and confiscation of her property. She managed to evade arrest, as she was protected by Olivier's eldest son Jean, Guilaume Berard, her squire and valet, Guionnet de Fay and Guillaume Denart.

The property of Olivier IV was confiscated and then doled out to vassals of the French King.:

- The chamberlain of the King, Thibault, Lord of Mateflon received property in the bailiff of Caen, the manor of Tuit, the forest of Cinglais and the iron mines of Beaumont worth about 100 Livres a year.
- A relative of Charles de Blois, Jean de Derval received lands and belongings of Goulaine and L’Epine, south of Nantes, worth about 500 livres a year.
- The Bishop of Leon, Pierre Benoit land owned in the parish of Guerande, worth about 25 livres a year.

== Notes ==
- Records exist where shortly after Olivier IV de Clisson's execution, several other knights were accused of similar crimes. The Lord of Malestroit and his son, the Lord of Avaugour, sir Tibaut de Morillon, Alain de Quédillac, Guillaume, Jean and Olivier de Brieux, Denis du Plessis, Jean Malart, Jean de Senadavy, Thibaut de Morillon, Denis de Callac and other lords of Brittany, to the number of ten knights and squires, were beheaded at Paris. Four other knights of Normandy, sir William Baron, sir Henry de Malestroit, the lord of Rochetesson, and Sir Richard de Persy, were put to death upon reports.

== See also ==
- Jeanne de Clisson, his second wife
- Olivier de Clisson, V, his son
- Amaury de Clisson, his brother
- Jean de Beaumanoir, a co-commander in the army of Charles de Blois.
- Luis de la Cerda, a co-commander in the army of Charles de Blois.
- Harvey VII, Lord of Léon, a co-commander.
- Charles, Duke of Brittany
- John IV, Duke of Brittany
- Philip VI of France
