= Sieges of Vannes (1342) =

Siege during One Hundred Years War

Coordinates: 47.6667°N 2.7667°W

Siege of Vannes
- Part of the War of the Breton Succession
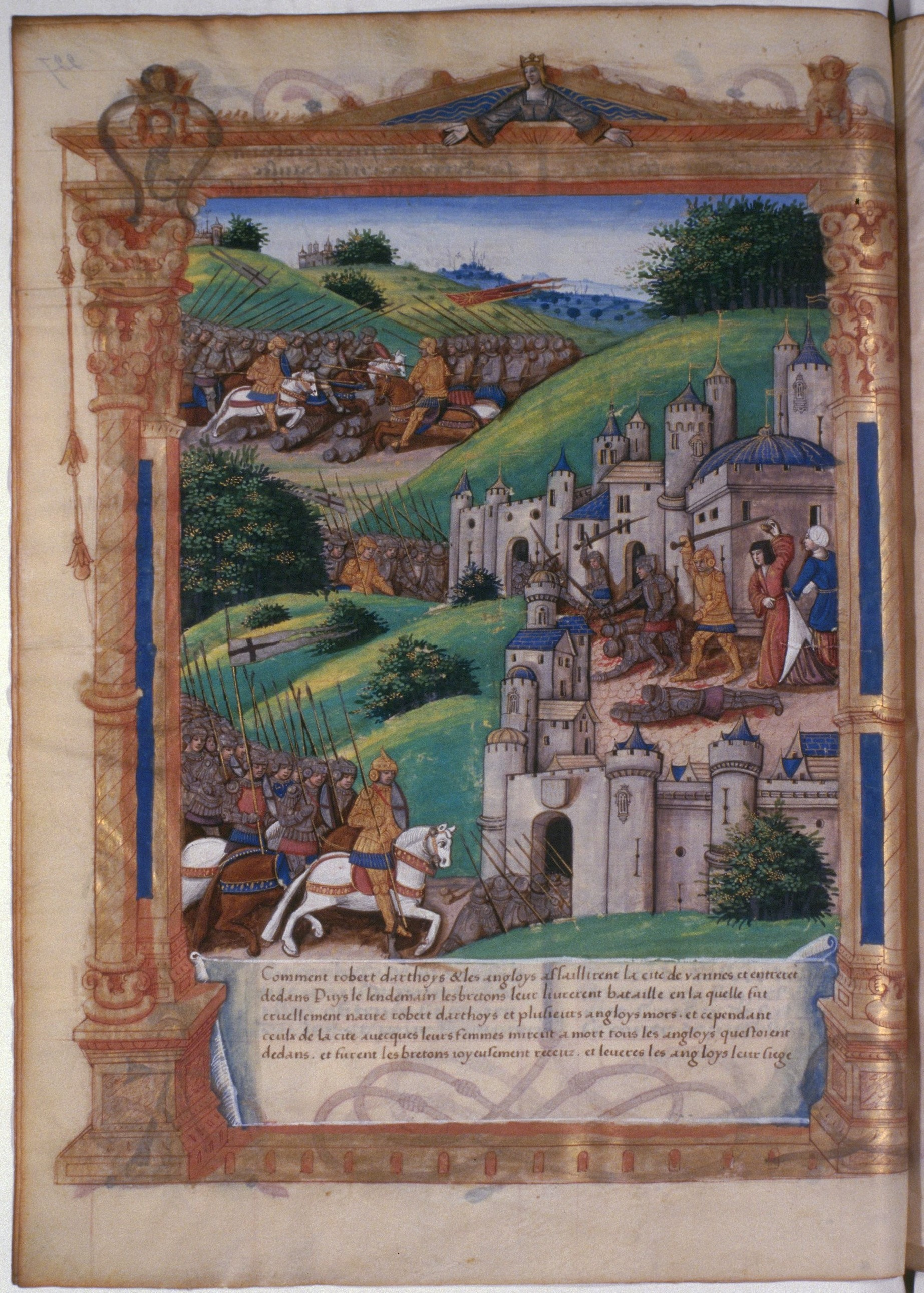
- Siege of Vannes in 1342 by Guillaume Fillastre
| Date | 4 sieges in 1342 |
| Location | Vannes, Brittany, France |
| Result | Intervention of Pope Clement VI; Truce of Malestroit; Presentation of the city to the papal legates |

Belligerents
| Party of Montfort: Bretons; Kingdom of England | Party of Blois: Bretons; Kingdom of France |

Commanders and leaders
| John of Montfort; Robert III of Artois †; Edward III | Charles of Blois; Olivier IV de Clisson |

Casualties and losses
| Unknown | Unknown |

The sieges of Vannes of 1342 were a series of four sieges of the town of Vannes that occurred throughout 1342. Two rival claimants to the Duchy of Brittany, John of Montfort and Charles of Blois, competed for Vannes throughout this civil war from 1341 to 1365. The successive sieges ruined Vannes and its surrounding countryside. Vannes was eventually sold off in a truce between England and France, signed in January 1343 in Malestroit. Saved by an appeal of Pope Clement VI, Vannes remained in the hands of its own rulers, but ultimately resided under English control from September 1343 till the end of the war in 1365.

== Context ==
In the beginning of the 14th century, the Sovereign Duchy of Brittany was culturally close to Celtic portions of the British Isles and this made it part of a sphere of economic influence with England, to which it supplied salt.

In the 12th century, the Plantagenets reigned Brittany and the House of Anjou benefited from conflicts between the counties of Nantes and the Dukes of Brittany, taking control of the Duchy by 1156. Between 1189 and 1204, the Plantagenet Richard Ist the Lionheart and then his brother, John opposed attempts for Brittany's autonomy, and increased a crisis which culminated in the alleged murder of Arthur of Brittany. This was further complicated when Philip II of France managed to place Peter Mauclerc as Duke.

=== Competing ducal claimants in the 14th century ===
The Duke of Brittany, John III, died on 30 April 1341 without a direct heir or a will to declare his succession. Charles de Blois, husband of the niece of the late Duke Jeanne de Penthievre, and Jean de Montfort, half-brother of John III, both claimed the Duchy.

In the larger geographical scheme, the Kingdom of France itself was engaged in the Hundred Years' War. Blois therefore allied himself with the French, and Montfort with the English. The two pretenders decided to defer to royal judgement. Sensing that the judgment of the King of France would be in favor of Charles de Blois, his nephew, Jean de Montfort, did an about-face. He captured the Ducal home in Limoges and moved to Nantes, where he convened the nobility of Brittany for recognition as the Duke. This attempt failed – the Breton Barons did not come for fear of reprisals, so on 1 June he embarked on a tour throughout the Duchy to ensure control of strongholds. Vannes declared allegiance to him.

== The year 1342 ==
=== First siege ===
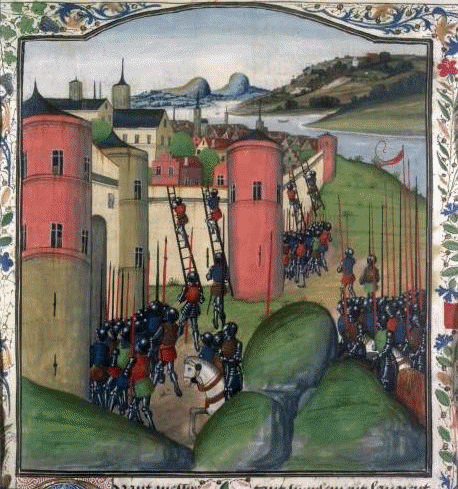
First siege of Vannes in 1342 by Jean de Wavrin

At the beginning of 1342, Charles de Blois appeared before the walls of Vannes, having looted and destroyed part of the suburbs outside the walls. The City Council began discussions with Charles, leading to the surrender of Vannes. Geoffrey of Malestroit, governor of the city, who had favoured Jean de Montfort. (Note: According to an older source (Joseph-Marie Le Led 'historical topography of the city of Vannes', 1897), an attack took place on the eve of negotiations. This is after a truce, was decided, during which a decision to take Vannes was taken.) escaped to Hennebont while Charles de Blois entered Vannes. He stayed for five days before returning to Carhaix.

=== Second siege ===
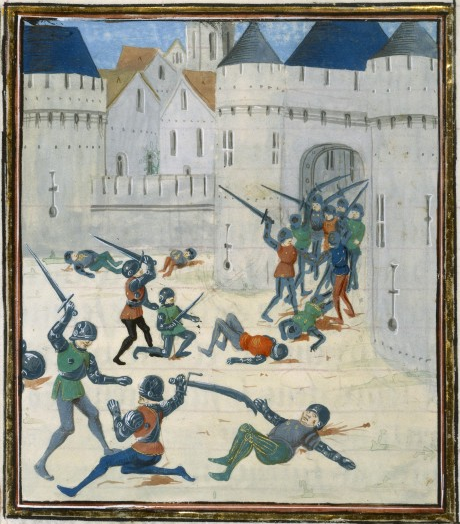
Second siege of Vannes

In October, Robert III d'Artois arrived in the Vannes district at the head of about 10,000 soldiers. At the same time, Joanna of Flanders, accompanied by Walter Manny, Guillaume of Cadoudal, Yves of Trésiguidy, a hundred men-at-arms, and a hundred archers, left Hennebont to join Artois.

The assault on the ramparts of Vannes occurred on three sides by Artois, Walter Manny and Treziguidy. The besiegers had to retreat in the face of resistance led by Olivier IV de Clisson. At night, Artois, accompanied by William Montagu, Earl of Salisbury, lit two fires in front of two of Vannes gates and attracted the city garrison there. During that time, a small group led by Walter Manny and the Count of Quenfort (Note: also named Kenfort) attacked a section of the wall abandoned by the defenders. The troops made a racket to make it appear that Vannes had been invaded. Vannes' garrison was flanked, a part of the city's defenders managed to escape while the rest was massacred. The city then returned to the control of Monfort.

A day after the capture of Vannes, Countess de Montfort arrived with her captains. She remained there for five days then returned to Hennebont with Walter Manny, leaving Robert d'Artois in charge of the Anglo-Breton garrison. In turn, William Montagu and Yves de Trésiguidy went to Rennes.

=== Third siege ===
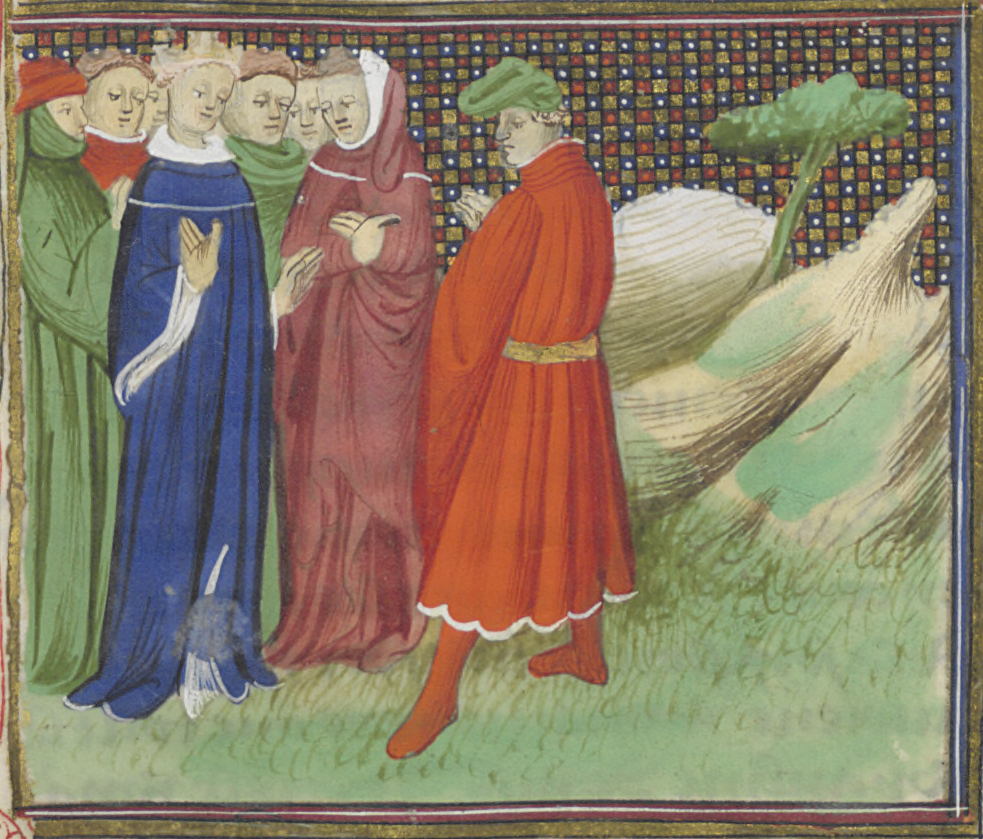
Edward III of England and Robert III of Artois

Clisson, who was absent during the capture of Vannes by Artois, was angered by the loss. Clisson raised about 12,600 men in addition to those of Robert II of Beaumanoir, Marshal of Brittany, and headed towards Vannes. D'Artois did not have time to gather reinforcements and had to fight with the forces left to him in November.

He could not prevent the loss of Vannes — troops from Blois entered the breaches that had occurred from the previous siege, that had not been repaired in time. Vannes was once again looted. During the siege, D'Artois received a wound from which he died some time after he was ferried to London for treatment. Vannes was returned to the control of Blois.

=== Fourth siege ===
Learning of the loss of Vannes, Edward III of England decided to avenge D'Artois. He went in person to Brittany and laid siege to three towns: (Rennes, Vannes and Nantes).

At the same time, Louis of Spain and Antonio Doria, admirals of France at the head of one hundred galleys and thirty ships, attacked all vessels carrying arms and supplies to the English. After losing several ships, Edward III, dispersed his fleet in order to save it; a portion was sent to Brest and another to Hennebont.

All English efforts were concentrated on the siege of Vannes that began on 5 December 1342. In a letter to his son, Edward described the city as "the best city in Brittany after the city of Nantes [...], on the sea and well defended." Arriving before the ramparts, he launched an assault, which was resisted by the defenders for six hours.

The besiegers settled in for the duration and therefore decided to systematically pillage the surroundings of Vannes. During one of the daily sorties by the besieged, Clisson was taken prisoner. On the English side, Ralph, Earl of Stafford, was also taken prisoner by the defenders of the city.

Meanwhile, Philip VI of France assembled a 50,000-man army under the command of his son, the future John II. This army advanced into Brittany and halted near the town of Ploërmel.

=== Papal intervention ===
Two legates of Pope Clement VI intervened, avoiding confrontation between the two armies: they obtained a three-year truce signed in Malestroit on 19 January 1343. The siege of Vannes was then lifted and the city was handed provisionally to the legates.

== Aftermath ==
In accordance with the stipulations of the Treaty of Malestroit, signed in January 1343, Vannes was temporarily handed over to the Cardinal Legates of Pope Clement VI, who installed governors. For Philip VI, the decree of Conflans regulated the question of the succession of John III. The treaty was therefore, for the court of France and that of Rome, favourable to Charles de Blois. The legates therefore determined to subsequently give the fortress back to the King of France.

=== English occupation ===
The citizens of Vannes as well as the local clergy were however loyal to John de Montfort and drove out the Papal agents a few months after the signing of the treaty. English troops reoccupied the town in September 1343. They stayed there for the next twenty years, until the treaty of Guérande of 1365.

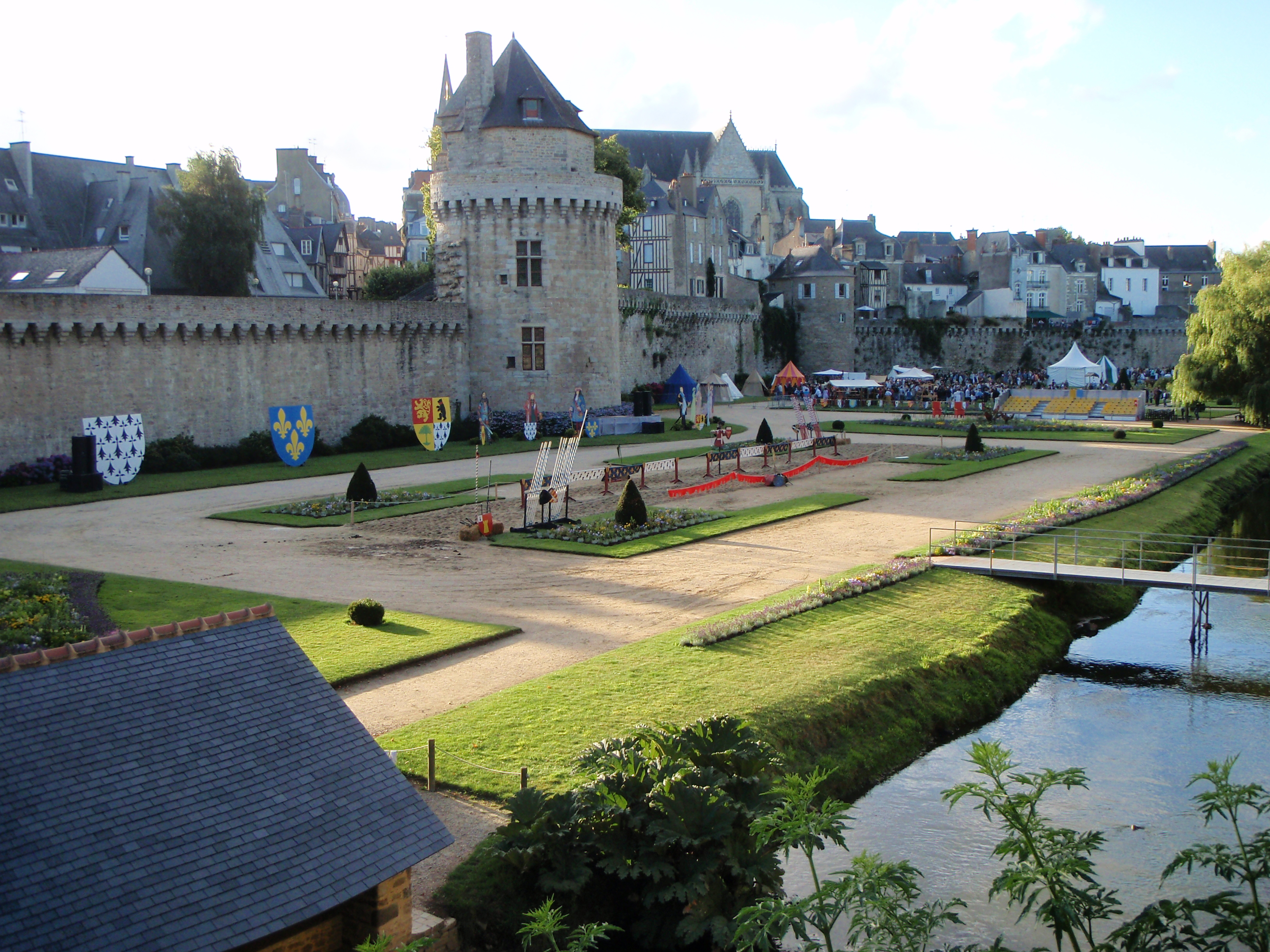
Second enclosure of the eastern walls of Vannes

For Vannes, the occupation marked a slowing down of activity. The surrounding villages and countryside had been destroyed by the succession of sieges. The reconstruction could not take place as long as the war continued. Nevertheless, Vannes profited from the preponderant situation of the English in France and of a significant trade with the occupied ports – Bordeaux and La Rochelle, for example, but also with the ports of England. Furthermore, the town council strengthened its autonomy and they were allowed to send representatives to the 1352 Estates of Brittany.

From 1365, under the authority of Duke John IV, Vannes began to prosper again. The scars of the past war however were still very present in the townscape. The Duke decided to rebuild the destroyed walls, to repair the gates and to enlarge the town wall. The enclosed town area was enlarged towards the south as far as the port, so that the area within the walls was doubled by it. Wanting to profit from the more central situation of the town in his Duchy (compared to the towns of Rennes or Nantes), he also constructed his new ducal residence there – the castle of l'Hermine. In 1379, after the return from exile of the Duke, Vannes became the seat of ducal power for several decades.

=== The execution of Olivier IV of Clisson ===
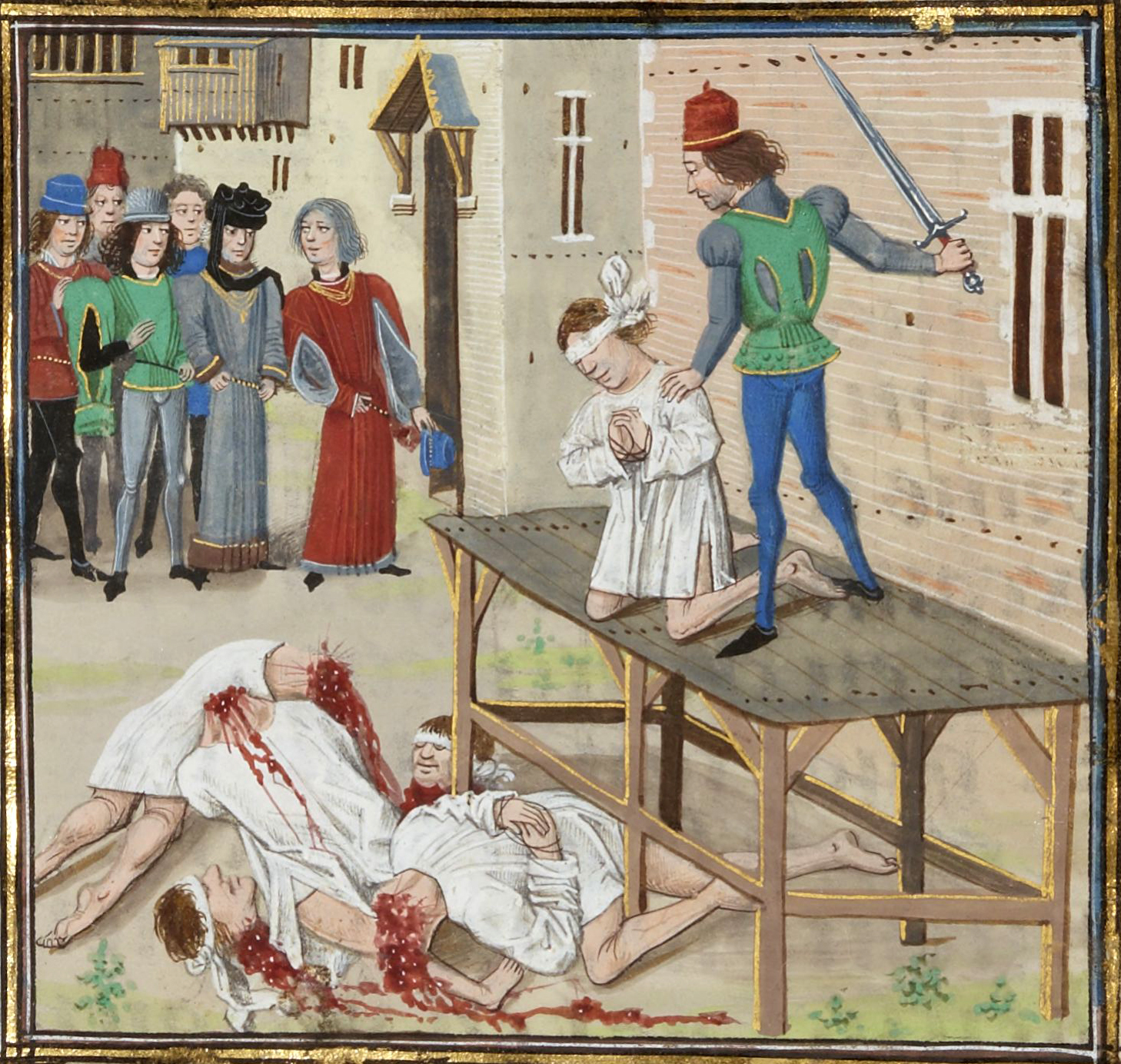
The execution of Olivier IV of Clisson by Loyset Liédet

Olivier IV de Clisson had been the military governor of Vannes on the side of Charles de Blois and the King of France when the English took the town after the fourth siege of Vannes in 1342. A prisoner, Oliver IV was taken to England and set free for a relatively small amount. Due to the perceived small amount of that ransom, Philip VI of France and his counsellors suspected Clisson of having intrigued with Edward III of England. Drawn by treachery to Paris, Olivier IV was executed by beheading by order of the French sovereign on 2 August 1343. This hasty execution shocked the nobility, his guilt of treason not having been publicly demonstrated at the time, since the decision had been taken by the King, (Note: According to Bordonove, Philippe Georges VI held concrete elements against Olivier IV proving its turnaround.) without process. Moreover, the notion of treason was not at the time understood in the same manner by the nobles. They claimed the right to choose whom to render homage to, without thereby being undignified. Olivier IV's execution was accompanied by a posthumous humiliation. His body hung by the armpits from sinister-looking forks on the scaffold of Montfaucon in Paris, and his head was exposed on the Sauvetout Gate at Nantes, while the rest of his corpse was exposed on the gates of Paris. These were outrages reserved for the remains of great criminals.

Olivier IV's widow, Jeanne de Belleville, urged their sons, Olivier and Guillaume, to avenge their father. Many lords of Brittany supported her cause and, with them, she started a guerilla war on the French King and Charles de Blois. She devoted her fortune to raise an army to attack French garrisons in Brittany. Threatened on land, she armed two ships and was accompanied by her two sons. She led a war of piracy against the French ships. This saga ended when some warships of the King of France seized the ships of Jeanne de Belleville, who managed to escape with her two sons on a lifeboat. The five days adrift were however fatal to Guillaume, who died of thirst, cold, and exhaustion. Olivier and his mother were eventually rescued and taken to Morlaix by some supporters of Montfort, enemies of the King of France at the time.

== Bibliography ==
- Bordonove, Georges (2006). Charles VI: Le roi fol et bien-aimé. Les Rois qui ont fait la France (in French). Paris: Pygmalion. ISBN 978-2-7564-0018-1.
- Bove, Boris (2009). Belin (ed.). Le Temps de la Guerre de Cent Ans: 1328-1453 (in French). Vol. 1. Paris. ISBN 978-2-7011-3361-4.
- Cassard, Jean-Christophe (2006). La Guerre de Succession de Bretagne (in French).
- Chaudré, Christian (2006). Vannes: Histoire et géographie contemporaine (in French). Éditions Palantines. ISBN 2-911434-55-2.
- Frélaut, Bertrand (2000). Jean-Paul Gisserot (ed.). Histoire de Vannes (in French). Les Universels Gisserot. ISBN 978-2-877475273.
- Le Mené, Joseph-Marie (1897). Topographie Historique de la Ville de Vannes (in French). Galles.
- Richard, Philippe (2007). Olivier de Clisson, connétable de France, grand seigneur breton (in French).
- Thomas-Lacroix, Pierre (1982). Le Vieux Vannes (in French). Vannes: Société polymathique du Morbihan.
