= Raoul de Caours =

14th century English nobleman

- Breton Knight
- Blason of Raoul de Caours of Guerande
- Born: Guérande, Brittany
- Died: July 1354; Nantes, Brittany

Raoul de Caours was a Breton knight who served both the English and French during the Hundred Years' War.

== Biography ==
Raoul de Caours was a knight originally from the Breton town of Guerande.

=== With the Anglo-Bretons ===
Raoul appears to have originally sided with the Montfortist cause in the War of the Breton Succession and was in the service of Jean de Montfort. This made him an English ally.

=== With the Franco-Bretons ===
By 1344, Raoul obtained a letter of remission from Philip VI of France. Remission was granted in forgiveness for "rebellions of which he was guilty and for the excesses he had committed in the wars in Brittany" "tam in partibus Britannie, quam Pictavie et alibi" Raoul then opposed Jean de Montfort.

=== A return to the Anglo-Bretons ===
Raoul was however back in the service of the English by 1347, when he was appointed Lieutenant in Poitou by Edward III of England. Raoul obtained a large monetary commission and ordered to capture Nantes. During 1347, Raoul captured the French captain, Louis I, Viscount of Thouars.

During the truce signed on 13 November 1348, between France and England, he is one of the captains appointed by England from among the judges and truce keepers in Brittany. By 14 June 1350, he is mentioned as an ally of the English.

=== Back to the Franco-Bretons ===
After a dispute with Walter Bentley, Raoul switched his allegiance back to France.

His is mentioned in a treaty, negotiated in 1350 with the commissioners of the new King of France, John II, according to which he "undertakes to leave the English party and to serve faithfully the King of France" at the cost of restitution in his favor "of the castles and lands of Beauvoir-sur-Mer, Île-Chauvet, Bouin and Lampant" which had been seized in 1349, by Galois de la Heuse, sovereign captain for the King in Poitou.

During an ambush set by Raoul in August 1350 at Auray, he defeated and killed Sir Thomas Dagworth, the English commander in Brittany.

On 4 January 1351, he undertakes by contract to retake for the French King, the towns of Vannes, Quimper and Guérande, as well as other strongholds. The king, in his letters from January 1351, calls it "dilectus and fidelis consiliarius noster."(our beloved and faithful counselor). Raoul captured Noirmoutier from the English in late 1351.

He was taken prisoner shortly after by a band led by a privateer Maciot de Mareuil, a former bourgeois of Nantes. The French offer Letters of remission and an annuity of 200 pounds on 25 February 1352, to them in exchange for the release of prisoners and safe return, however letters from 19 October 1353, showed that the negotiations had not yet been concluded and subsequently Raoul Caours died in captivity before July 1354.

== Lasting Reputation ==
Raoul constant changing of sides has not left him a favourable reputation:

"Raoul Cahours is a figure of the most cynical bandit offered the XIV th century, yet so rich in types of robbery. Perpetually changing parties according to his interest of the moment, lunch in England and supper in France, fight the next day those we served the day before, betray the highest bidder and the last bidder, such is the profession that Raoul does all. his life. "

- Siméon Luce, History of Bertrand Du Guesclin: the youth of Bertrand, 1876
