= 1356 (novel) =

2012 historical novel by Bernard Cornwell

- First edition cover
- Author: Bernard Cornwell
- Language: English
- Series: The Grail Quest series
- Genre: Historical novel
- Publisher: HarperCollins
- Publication date: 27 September 2012
- Publication place: United Kingdom
- Media type: Print (hardcover and paperback), audiobook, and e-book
- Pages: 400 pp (first edition hardback)
- ISBN: 978-0007331840 (first edition hardback)
- Preceded by: Heretic

1356 is the fourth novel in The Grail Quest series by Bernard Cornwell, first published in 2012. It is set in 1356, nearly a decade after the original trilogy, and culminates with the Battle of Poitiers. Intertwined in the plot is the quest to find la Malice, a fabled sword of Saint Peter and Christian relic which may turn the tide of the long war for France.

== Plot summary ==
In 1356, Thomas has achieved his ambition of leading his own mercenary company of archers and men-at-arms. They are based in Castillon d'Arbazon, the castle in Gascony he captured years before (as recounted in the previous novel, Heretic). He and his wife Genevieve have a young son named Hugh.

Thomas is hired by the grossly obese French Count of Labrouillade to assault a castle and retrieve his beautiful, young runaway wife, Bertille. Thomas succeeds, but when Labrouillade cheats him out of part of his pay, Thomas ambushes and captures the count on his way home, releasing him after receiving payment. Genevieve talks Thomas into allowing Bertille to come with them. Later, Labrouillade persuades Sir Roland de Verrec, the finest tournament champion in Europe, to challenge Thomas one-on-one for Bertille, but Thomas mocks him and sends him away.

Brother Michael, a young monk from England, brings Thomas a message from the Earl of Northampton, his liege lord. Northampton wants him to find yet another holy relic, la Malice, the sword used by Peter to defend Jesus in the Garden of Gethsemane. (The Black Friars have spread stories of its alleged powers throughout Europe.) Meanwhile, Fra Ferdinand, a Black Friar, retrieves the sword from its hiding place at the request of an old friend, only to learn that his friend has been murdered by men who claim they were sent by the Pope at Avignon to search for it.

Thomas searches for information in hostile France, hiding his identity. In Avignon, he meets an old foe, the ambitious Cardinal Louis Bessières, for the first time face-to-face. Bessières, who is also searching for la Malice, unintentionally gives him a clue by directing a painter to immediately cover up a scene on a wall. Father Marchant, Bessières' henchman/interrogator, becomes suspicious, so Thomas hastily departs.

Later, when Thomas seeks a scholar, he encounters Roland de Verrec, who denounces him. In the ensuing chase, he hides in the room of a dowager countess, who identifies the obscure saint in the painting Bessières wanted covered up as Junien, to whom la Malice was supposedly entrusted. Thomas gets away, but Genevieve and Hugh are captured. Roland takes them to Labrouillade. Father Marchant interrogates Genevieve, blinding her in one eye. Her screams cause Thomas's old friend Robbie Douglas and Roland to rescue her and Hugh, with the help of Sculley, a huge, murderous Scottish warrior, and reunite them with Thomas. Roland is unwilling to switch sides at first, but then he and Bertille see each other; it is love at first sight for both. Roland is famous for vowing to remain a virgin (after he had a vision of Mary) until he marries. Thus he must first dispose of Labrouillade.

Thomas is ordered to join Edward, the heir to the English throne, on his chevauchée (large-scale destructive raid) in France. On his way, he discovers that Junien's abbey is nearby. He finds Bessières and his men already there. Bessières has found the sword. Before Bessières has Thomas executed with it, the English Earl of Warwick arrives and rescues him. Sculley, however, escapes with la Malice.

Thomas and his men join the English army, which is being pursued by a much larger force commanded by Jean, King of France. When the English, tired, thirsty and hungry, are trapped on a hill, Edward accepts severe terms of surrender, but the indecisive Jean is persuaded to attack instead. He is heartened when Bessières shows him la Malice; according to legend, whoever possesses it is invincible. Oh the eve of battle, Sculley demands the sword, and Bessières gives it to him.

However, in the Battle of Poitiers, the French are routed after a long, hard-fought fight, panicking after being attacked in the rear by a small force led by the Captal de Buch and including Thomas and many of his archers. Thomas's men take prisoner the Archbishop of Sens and an enemy, Count Joscelyn, whose ransoms will enable him to purchase an estate in his home county of Devon. Thomas kills Sculley and takes possession of la Malice. He stabs Bessières and Father Marchant to death with it. He also kills Labrouillade for Roland and Bertille's sake. Afterward, he purposely discards la Malice in a pile of unwanted weapons that are to be melted down.

== Characters ==
- Thomas of Hookton - leader of a band of English and Welsh longbowmen and men-at-arms of various nationalities
- Genevieve - Thomas's wife
- Hugh - Thomas's son
- Robbie Douglas - Scottish noble, Thomas's friend
- William, Lord of Douglas - uncle of Robbie Douglas, fighting for the French so he can fight the English
- Sculley - a fearsome Scottish warrior in the service of Lord Douglas
- Brother Michael - a young English monk travelling to Montpellier to study to become a doctor; he joins the Hellequin instead
- Éamonn Óg Ó Keane - an Irish student at Montpellier reluctantly studying to be a priest; he joins Thomas's band too
- The Count of Labrouillade - a grossly fat and rich French nobleman
- Bertille, Countess of Labrouillade - the beautiful young wife of the count
- Sir Roland de Verrec - The Virgin Knight
- Edward, the Black Prince - Prince of Wales and leader of the English army
- Jean III de Grailly, the Captal de Buch - a noted Gascon soldier, one of the leaders of the English army
- William de Montacute, 2nd Earl of Salisbury - one of the leaders of the English army
- Jean II - King of France
- Prince Charles - Dauphin of France, eldest son of King Jean
- Prince Philippe - youngest son of King Jean
- Arnoul d'Audrehem - a Marshal of France
- Cardinal Bessières - a corrupt French cardinal who aspires to become Pope
- Father Marchant/Father Calade - an evil priest working for the cardinal
- Roger de Beaufort - a clever but conservative student at Montpellier
- Fra Ferdinand - a Black Friar, who finds and hides La Malice

== Reviews ==
Bill Sheehan writing in The Washington Post finds this latest addition to Cornwell's historical novels to be accurate, coherent, lively and accessible.

Much of Cornwell's considerable reputation rests on the quality of his battle sequences, which are vivid, colorful and invariably convincing. His account of what happened in the field outside Poitiers is no exception. As always, Cornwell captures the essence of hand-to-hand combat — the stench, the confusion, the horrific brutality — with precision and immediacy. More than that, he imposes a degree of coherence on what must have been an utterly chaotic experience.... The result is a lively, accessible account of a remote moment in European history, a book in which Cornwell's gifts as scholar and storyteller come together spectacularly.

Publishers Weekly says no one describes a close hand-to-hand battle like Bernard Cornwell:

Cornwell, a master of action-packed historical fiction, returns with the fourth book in his Grail Quest series (after Heretic), a vivid, exciting portrayal of medieval warfare as the English and French butcher each other at the Battle of Poitiers in 1356 during the Hundred Years War. Nobody writes battle scenes like Cornwell, accurately conveying the utter savagery of close combat with sword, ax, and mace, and the gruesome aftermath.

Kirkus Reviews finds this novel's plot less tightly woven than the best of Bernard Cornwell's novels, limiting its audience to those who already have interest in the historical period of the fight for France in the Hundred Years' War.

Few of these characters have any inkling that a pivotal battle in the endless war for France looms ahead. Neither, for that matter, will unwary readers. For, although every intrigue springs to life under the close-up focus veteran Cornwell (Death of Kings, 2012, etc.) has long since mastered, the strands aren't always closely knitted together: Heroes and subplots blossom and fade with no consistent sense of their connections, and readers approaching the tale without the appropriate historical background will have to survive a long probationary period before they realize where this is all heading.

Best for fans of historical fiction who have both a taste for the Hundred Years' War and some base-line knowledge that will allow them to enjoy this swashbuckling recreation.
