= Order of the Star (France) =

Order of Knighthood created by John II of France

Order of the Star (The Knights of Our Lady of the Noble House) Ordre de l'Étoile
- The badge of the Order of the Star as described by John II the Good of France.

Awarded by the Kings of France
- Type: Monarchical Order of Knighthood
- Established: 6 November 1351
- Country: Kingdom of France
- Religious affiliation: Catholic Church
- Seat: Saint-Ouen, France
- Motto: Monstrant regibus astra viam (“The star[s] show the way to kings”)
- Eligibility: Nobles and knights
- Criteria: Distinguished merits in battle
- Status: Defunct
- Founder: John II of France
- Sovereign: John II of France
- Grades: Knight

Statistics
- First induction: 1352
- Last induction: before 1380
- Total inductees: Up to 500, 100+ likely

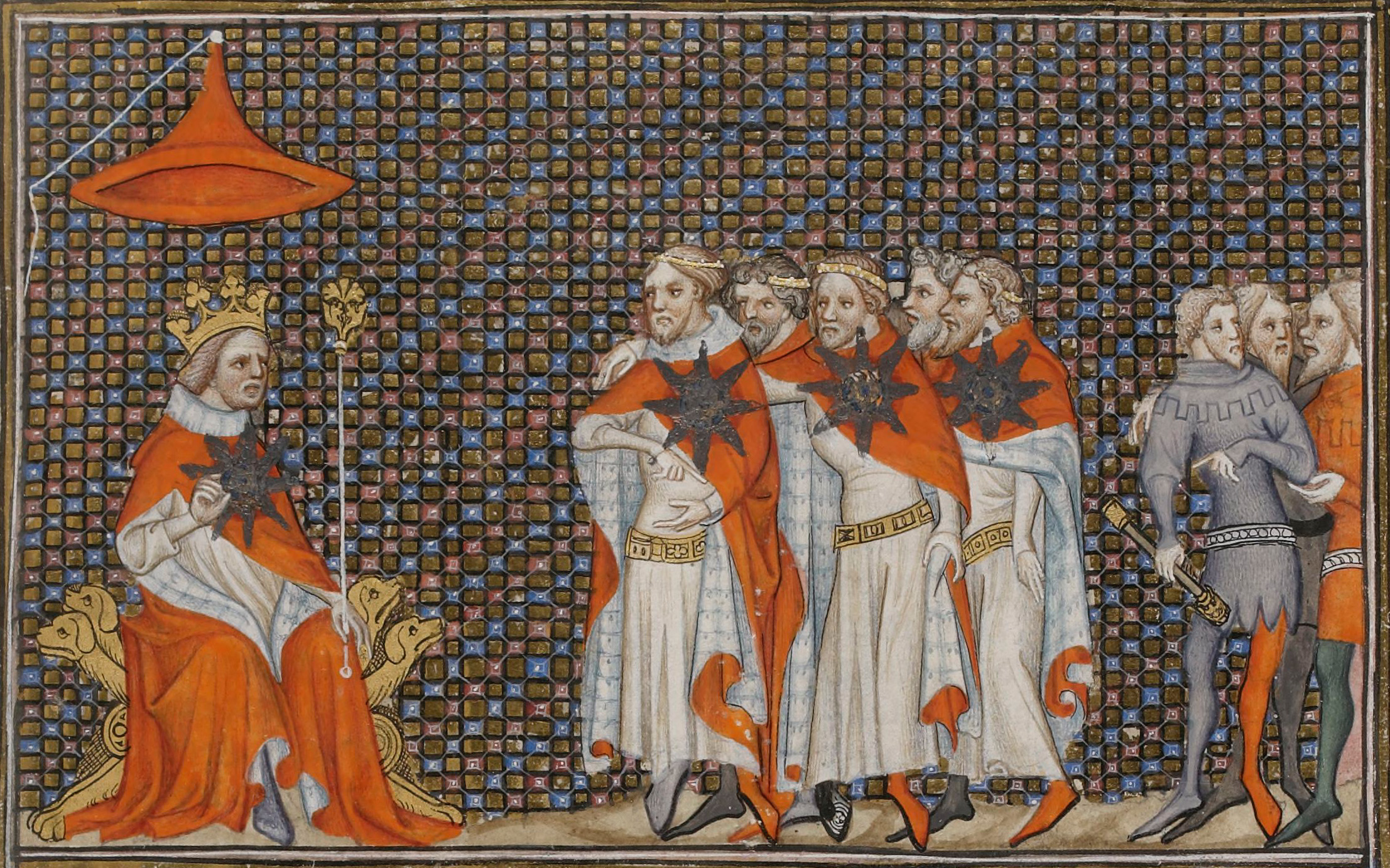
14th-century depiction of the Order's founding meeting (Bibliothèque nationale de France)

The Order of the Star (French: Ordre de l'Étoile) or Company of the Star was an order of chivalry founded on 6 November 1351 by John II of France, to rival the Order of the Garter founded in 1348 by Edward III of England. This was the first monarchical order of knighthood, and first military order in French history. The inaugural ceremony of the order took place on 6 January 1352 at Saint-Ouen, from which it is sometimes called the Order of Knights of the Noble House of Saint Ouen.

== History ==
The Order was initially conceived of in 1344 by John of Valois, Duke of Normandy and future king of France. This project, like the one to refound the Round Table which seems to have inspired it, had to be postponed for a number of years, and was only brought to fruition in January 1352 - nearly two years after the first feast of the Order of the Garter, and more than sixteen months after John succeeded his father on the French throne as king John II of France.

Established under sanction of Pope Clement VI, the Order of the Star's inaugural ceremony on January 6, 1352, had a lower turnout than anticipated and embarrassingly, a small English force took the castle of Guînes while its captain, the Sire of Bavilenghem, attended the meeting. The Order was designed to accommodate up to 500 members, a notably larger figure compared to the 24 members of the English Order of the Garter. The significant losses of 80–90 knights at the Battle of Mauron suggest that the Order had a robust membership, with knights likely inducted beyond the initial meeting.

The Order's chapter house was to be funded by lands and wealth seized in prosecution of crimes of lèse-majesté. However, in the end, the king granted little of the wealth promised, finding it more profitable to use confiscated or forfeited lands to buy off noblemen's loyalties.

The Order was inspired by Geoffroy de Charny, theoretician of chivalry and elite knight who ultimately earned the apex privilege of Oriflamme bearer. In part it was intended to prevent the disaster of Crécy and to this end only success on the battlefield counted towards a member's merit, not success in tournaments. By its statutes, members also received a small payment and the Order provided housing in retirement. They were sworn not to retreat or move more than four arpents (about six acre's breadths) from a battle. This last provision cost the lives of ninety members of the Order at the Battle of Mauron in 1352, and at the Battle of Poitiers in 1356 cost the king his freedom when many, if not most, of his fellow knights of the Star lost their lives. The Order fell rapidly into disuse during John's captivity in London, but afterwards the nominal ranks swelled so enormously that by the time of Charles V its bestowal was meaningless.

== Dress ==
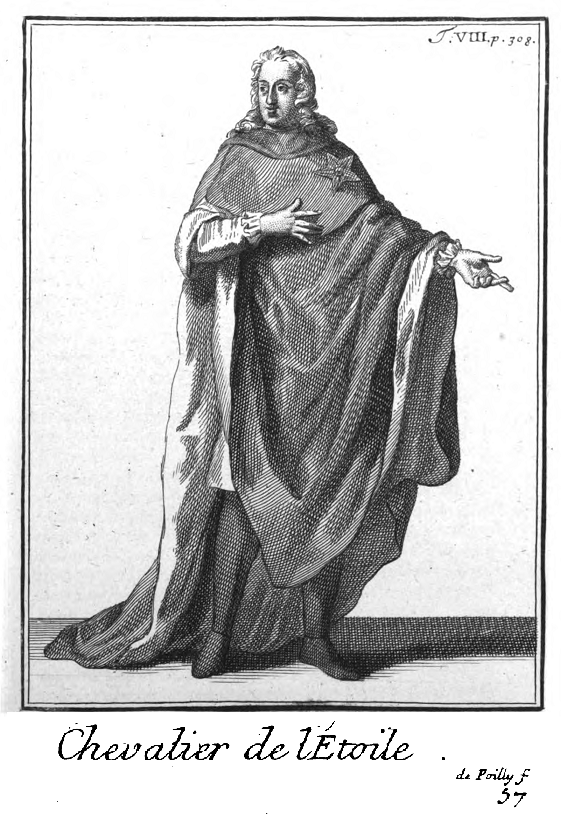
Ceremonial cloth of a knight of the Order (François de Poilly, Reconstruction of the 17th century)

The badge of the Order was described by its founder as "a white star, in the middle of the star a roundel of azure, in the middle of this roundel of azure a little gold sun". The motto Monstrant regibus astra viam ("the star[s] show the way to kings") refers to the Three Kings led by the Star of Bethlehem, however some scholars have suggested that the star symbol on the Order's badge represented the Virgin Mary and the sun represented Christ, with the motto being a later attribution. If an existing manuscript illumination (illustration) depicting the founding meeting of the Order is accurate, the Order's garb consisted in red robes lined with vair bearing eight-pointed black stars set with various gemstones worn on the upper left side of the mantle. The exact size of this star and the number and value of the gemstones with which it was set varied according to the knight's own choice since the star was made at the knight's own expense. The insignia also included a gold ring of which the enamelled red bezel was circular; within it an eight-pointed star in white enamel extending past the diameter of the bezel, and within the star a roundel of azure containing a small yellow sun. The name of the knight to whom the ring belonged was inscribed on the outside of the ring around this bezel, presumably so it could be sent back to the king to identify the particular knight who had died in battle.

The Order also had a red banner sprinkled with white eight-pointed stars and bearing an image of the Virgin at its center.

== Influence and Legacy ==
=== Influence on Later Chivalric Orders ===
While the Order itself was relatively short-lived, the use of an eight-pointed star worn on the left breast became very influential in the design of the insignia of many later orders of chivalry and still later orders of merit.

The Order of the Star's insignia featured an eight-pointed star, often adorned with gemstones and worn on the left breast, accompanied by a gold ring with an eight-pointed star in white enamel, and this, along with the Order's visibility in the 14th century when chivalric orders gained prominence, contributed to its influence. Its flexible design (knights could customize size and gemstones) and left-breast placement became a standard for later orders. Despite its decline after 1356, the symbolic legacy endured through star motifs in chivalric and merit-based orders, particularly in British and French contexts.

It also had an effect on the behaviour of other chivalric orders. Several orders effectively required their companions to display courage, if only by threatening to punish cowardice. The Order of the Star required its members to swear never to retreat more than a certain distance when engaged in a battle, and five later orders (the Knot, Golden Fleece, the Ermine, Saint Michael, and after 1518 the Collar) imitated this by threatening their companions with severe penalties if they fled from a field of battle.

==== Orders Influenced by the Order of the Star ====
The Order of the Star's eight-pointed star became a lasting symbol in European chivalric traditions, influencing the design of insignia in several notable orders.

- The Company of the Knot founded by Louis I of Naples was inspired by and directly based upon the Order of the Star, as set forth in John II's November 1351 letter proclaiming the French order. Large sections were clearly lifted almost word for word from the prologue and epilogue. In addition, every one of the twenty-one items listed in the John's letter are clearly represented among the statutes of the Knot, and some of the corresponding ordinances in the latter document are expressed in almost identical words.
- Supreme Order of the Most Holy Annunciation, a.k.a. The Order of the Collar copied its banner of the Virgin Mary surrounded by stars from that of the Star.
- The Order of the Ship adopted its rules for how its banner was raised and treated in battle from that of the Star. The raising of the banner was a serious matter in this period, as it indicated the status not merely of the combatant who raised it but, under the complex and formalized rules of war then prevailing, that of the encounter itself.
- The Order of the Golden Fleece' statutes specify that both mantle and chaperon were to be made of red cloth-of-scarlet, and that the mantle was to be floor-length, lined in menu-iiair, and decorated with a rich border composed of fusils, flints, sparks, and fleeces. Not only the colour, fabric, and lining of this mantle, but its cut and the manner of its wearing were identical to those of the Order of the Star.
- Order of the Bath (United Kingdom, est. 1725) A prominent British chivalric order, features an eight-pointed silver star for its Knights and Dames Grand Cross, worn on the left breast, aligning with the precedent set by the Order of the Star. The design draws on earlier chivalric traditions, including those popularized in the 14th century. The star includes a central disc with the heraldic shield of St. George's Cross, encircled by a garter.
- Order of the British Empire (United Kingdom, est. 1917) Established by King George V, this order incorporates an eight-pointed star for Knights and Dames Grand Cross, pinned to the left breast, echoing the Order of the Star's placement and shape. The star features a central disc with the effigies of King George V and Queen Mary, surrounded by the motto “For God and the Empire.”
- Order of the Star of India (British Raj, est. 1861) Founded by Queen Victoria, this order used an eight-pointed silver star for Knights Commanders, with a sunburst design for Knights Grand Commanders, reflecting the influence of earlier chivalric orders. The motto “Heaven’s Light Our Guide” aligns with the stellar symbolism of divine guidance.
- Imperial Service Order (United Kingdom, est. 1902) Established by King Edward VII, this order features an eight-pointed silver star backing a central disc with the reigning sovereign's cipher, mirroring the chivalric tradition of the Order of the Star. The star's placement on the left chest suggests a direct influence.
- Order of the Black Star (France/Dahomey, est. 1889) Established in Porto-Novo (modern Benin) and recognized by the French government, this order's star motif likely reflects the French tradition of star-based insignia initiated by the Order of the Star. The order rewarded efforts to expand French influence in West Africa.

==== Influence on Other European Orders ====
The eight-pointed star became common in European chivalric orders from the 15th to 19th centuries. Examples include:

- Order of St Michael and St George (United Kingdom, est. 1818) Primarily using a seven-pointed star, some early designs may reflect the influence of eight-pointed star motifs.
- Order of the Polar Star (Sweden, est. 1748) Incorporates star-shaped insignia, with eight-pointed forms in related decorations, potentially influenced by French traditions.
- Order of the Red Eagle (Prussia, est. 1705, reorganized 1810) Uses star-shaped breast insignia, drawing on European chivalric trends.

=== Influence on Law Enforcement Badges ===
The Order of the Star popularized the eight-pointed star as a symbol of elite status, influencing European orders. These orders shaped heraldic traditions that reached America with settlers. Star motifs, including eight-pointed forms, appeared in European heraldry and military insignia (e.g., Bedfordshire Regiment), and sheriffs likely drew on these traditions. Stars in Freemasonry, religious symbolism, and civic seals (e.g., Baltimore's badges) suggest multiple influences, and the eight-pointed star's chivalric origins may have contributed to the star's symbolic currency.

Sheriff badges stem from medieval Europe, where knights wore heraldic symbols like stars to signify authority. The Order of the Star's eight-pointed star, worn on the left breast, established a precedent for star-shaped insignia. In the 19th-century Wild West, badges identified law enforcement officers in transient communities. The star shape, symbolizing guidance and protection, was practical and resonant, often crafted from tin cans or Mexican coins. Early American badges appeared in cities like Boston and Baltimore in the mid-19th century, often as rayed stars modeled after English chivalric medallions and city seals. Baltimore's star badges around 1853 coincided with Freemasonry and Jewish symbolism (e.g., the hexagram). In western territories, sheriffs adopted star badges for visibility and authority. The six-pointed star, associated with the Seal of Solomon, gained prominence, possibly due to its mystical connotations. The seven-pointed star, linked to religious symbolism (e.g., the seven seals), also became common. By the late 19th century, badges included department names or ranks, with stars as the dominant form. While no sources explicitly link star-shaped law enforcement badges to the Order of the Star, its eight-pointed star may have indirectly contributed to the star's adoption as a symbol of authority via its chivalric legacy, which firmly has its origins in the Order.

=== Other Influences ===
The coat of arms of Saint-Ouen-sur-Seine, inspired by the Order of the Star.

The ruins of the Order's chapter house are located under an apartment complex in the current French commune of Saint-Ouen-sur-Seine, which also has its coat of arms inspired by the Order.

== See also ==
- Order of Saint Michael
- Order of the Holy Spirit
- Legion of Honour
