= Battle of La Roche-Derrien =

Battle of the Hundred Years' War

- Part of the War of the Breton Succession
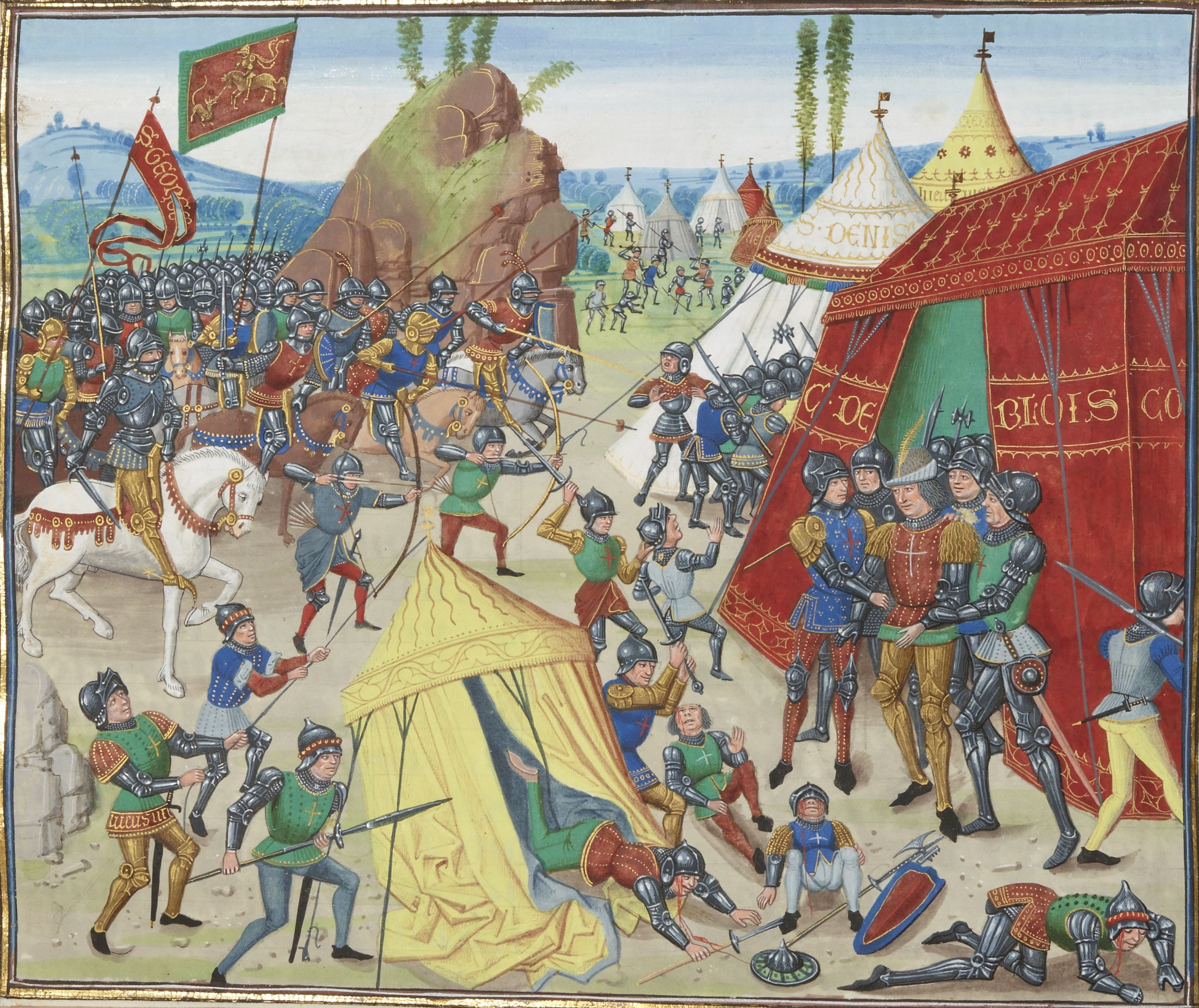
- Charles de Blois, Duke of Brittany, is taken prisoner after the battle of La Roche-Derrien
Date	1347, during the night
Location	La Roche-Derrien, France
Result	Anglo-Breton victory

Belligerents
House of Montfort, Brittany; Kingdom of England	House of Blois, Brittany; Kingdom of France

Commanders and leaders
Thomas Dagworth	Charles of Blois (POW)

Strength
1,000	4,000–5,000

Casualties and losses
Unknown	Unknown

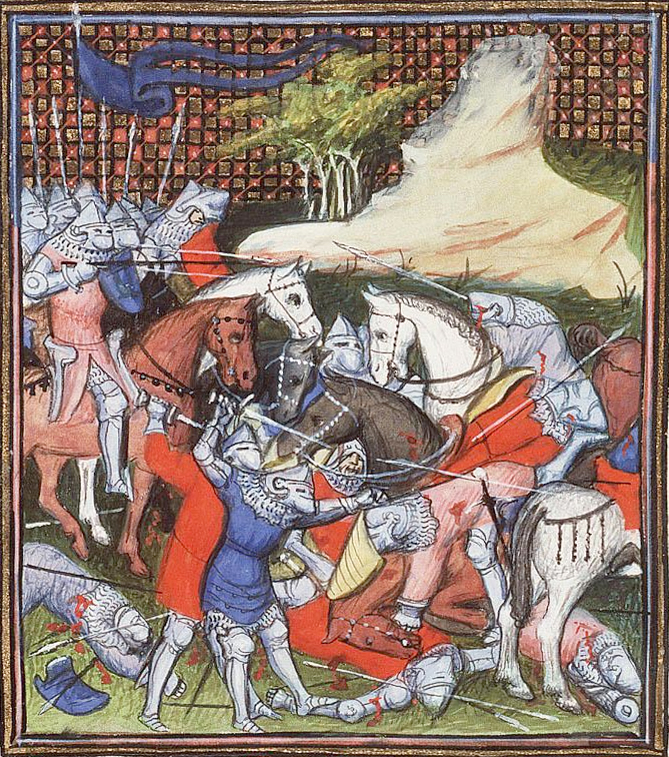
Another version of Charles de Blois being taken prisoner

The Battle of La Roche-Derrien was one of the battles of the Breton War of Succession; it was fought on 20 June 1347 during the night between Anglo-Breton and Franco-Breton forces. Approximately 4,000–5,000 French, Breton and Genoese mercenaries (the largest field army ever assembled by Charles of Blois) laid siege to the town of La Roche-Derrien in the hope of luring Sir Thomas Dagworth, the commander of the only standing English field army in Brittany at the time, into an open pitched battle.

== Prelude ==
Charles of Blois (a.k.a. Charles, Duke of Brittany), in an effort to defeat the English longbowmen, gave orders to set up four encampments around the town's four gates. Weak palisades were established to give cover for his men; his thinking being that the archers could not kill what they could not see. Charles gave his men strict orders to stay in their encampments so as not to be easy targets for the archers.

== Battle ==
When Dagworth's relief army, less than one-fourth the size of the Franco-Breton force, arrived at La Roche-Derrien, they attacked the eastern (main) encampment and fell into the trap laid by Charles. Dagworth's main force was assailed with crossbow bolts from front and rear and after a short time Dagworth himself was forced to surrender.

Charles, thinking he had won the battle and that Brittany was effectively his, lowered his guard. However a sortie from the town, composed mainly of townsfolk armed with axes and farming implements, came from behind Charles's lines. The archers and men-at-arms who remained from the initial assault now rallied with the town's garrison to cut down Charles' forces. Charles was forced to surrender and was taken for ransom.

His strict orders to his commanders to stay in their encampments was his eventual downfall as the Anglo-Breton forces managed to clear each encampment one by one.

== In historical fiction ==
The battle features in Bernard Cornwell's historical novel Vagabond—part of his Grail Quest series of books, set against the background of the Hundred Years' War.

The battle is also featured in Richard Donner’s 2003 film "Timeline", itself an adaptation of Michael Chrichton’s 1999 novel of the same name. The film follows a team of archaeologists-turned-time-travelers, lost during the battle.

== Bibliography ==
- Sumption, Jonathan. The Hundred Years’ War Volume I: Trial by Battle. London: Faber and Faber, 1990 ISBN 0-571-13895-0
