= Thomas Dagworth =

English knight and soldier

Sir Thomas Dagworth
- English Knight
- Blason of Sir Thomas Dagworth
- Born: 1276; Essex, England
- Died: 1350 (aged 73–74); Brittany
- Spouse: Eleanor de Bohun

Sir Thomas Dagworth (1276 – 20 July 1350) was an English knight and soldier, who led the joint English-Breton armies in Brittany during the Hundred Years' War.

== Hundred Years War ==
=== Breton War of Succession ===
In 1346 he led a small English force in Brittany in support of John de Montfort's claim on the dukedom. De Montfort was backed by the English throne, whereas his rival, Charles of Blois was backed by the French. On 9 June, Dagworth's force was attacked by Charles' much larger army in the Battle of Saint-Pol-de-Léon. Though almost surrounded, the longbowmen won the day for the Anglo-Breton Forces.

The next year, on 20 June, he claimed an even more famous victory at the Battle of La Roche-Derrien, where he captured Charles of Blois.

He was summoned to the Parliament of England in 1347 as Baron Dagworth.

He was killed in an ambush on 20 July 1350, near Auray, a few miles west of Vannes, by a Franco-Breton force under Raoul de Caours.

=== Marriage and issue ===
Sir Thomas came from Bradwell Juxta Coggeshall in Essex. In 1343 he had married Eleanor de Bohun, Countess of Ormonde, the daughter of Humphrey de Bohun, 4th Earl of Hereford and Elizabeth Plantagenet, King Edward II's sister. They had a daughter Eleanor, who married Walter Fitzwalter, 3rd Baron Fitzwalter.

Sir Nicholas Dagworth of Blickling, Norfolk (died 1402) who played a considerable role in the government of Ireland in the late 1370s, was probably his nephew, the son of his brother Nicholas.

== See also ==
- Walter Bentley (died 1359)
- Raoul de Caours
