= 1351 in France =

- Decades: 1330s; 1340s; 1350s; 1360s; 1370s
- See also: History of France; Timeline of French history; List of years in France

Events from the year 1351 in France

== Incumbents ==
- Monarch – John II

== Events ==
- February – The French besiege the town of Saint-Jean-d'Angély with an army of several thousand men led by Guy II de Nesle and his deputy Arnoul d'Audrehem.
- March 26 – The Combat of the Thirty (part of Breton War of Succession) is fought to determine who would rule the Duchy of Brittany. It was an arranged fight of thirty chosen knights each, from the Kingdoms of France and England, that fought at a site midway between the Breton castles of Josselin and Ploërmel. The challenge was issued by Jean de Beaumanoir, a captain of Charles of Blois supported by King Philip VI of France, to Robert Bemborough, a captain of Jean de Montfort supported by Edward III of England.
- April 1 – The Battle of Saintes between French and English forces takes place near Saint-Jean-d'Angély. The English force led by the Seneschal of Gascony, John de Cheverston and Arnaud-Amanieu are victorious, but was unable to fulfil its mission to resupply the besieged town of Saint-Jean-d'Angély.
  - Guy II de Nesle is captured and the French pay a heavy ransoms for his release.
  - Arnoul d'Audrehem is captured and the French pay a heavy ransoms for his release.
- June 6 – The Battle of Ardres is fought between French and English forces near the town of Ardres, Pas de Calais. The French led by Édouard I de Beaujeu, defeat the English and capture English commander of Calais John de Beauchamp.
- August 31 – The French captured the besieged town of Saint-Jean-d'Angély upon the arrival of the King of France.

== Births ==
- May – Joan of France, French noble

=== Date unknown ===
- Pierre d'Ailly, French theologian, astrologer and cardinal

== Deaths ==
- February 19 – Jean II des Granges, Abbott of Bec Abbey
- August 4 – Jean de Vienne, French nobleman
- June 8 – Édouard I de Beaujeu, Marshal of France, Lord of Beaujeu and Montpensier
- June 14 – Jean de Vienne, Bishop of Avranches, French prelate and diplomat (b. 1316)
