= Siege of Saint-Jean-d'Angély =

Siege of Saint-Jean-d'Angély may refer to:

- Siege of Saint-Jean-d'Angély (1351) during the Hundred Years' War
- Siege of Saint-Jean-d'Angély (1569)
- Siege of Saint-Jean-d'Angély (1621) during the Wars of Religion
