= Mongol bow =

Type of bow and arrow developed in Mongolia

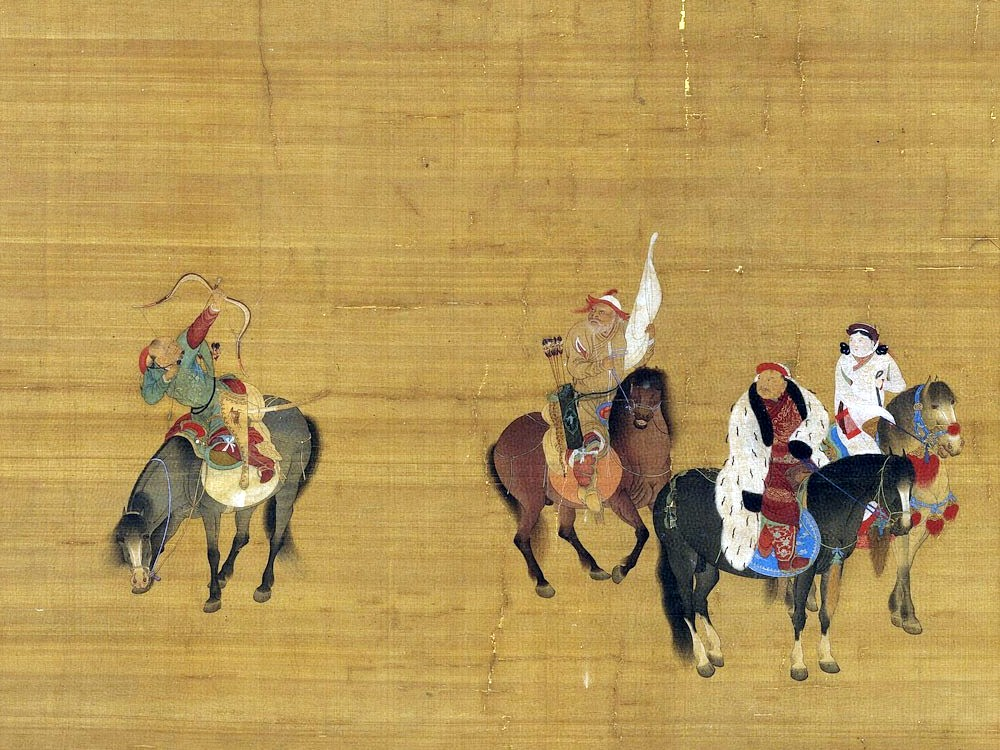
This c. 1280 painting depicts an archer shooting a traditional Mongol bow from horseback.

The Mongol bow is a type of recurved composite bow historically used in Mongolia, and by the horse archers of the Mongol Empire. "Mongol bow" can refer to two types of bow. From the 17th century onward, most of the traditional bows in Mongolia were replaced with the similar Manchu bow which is primarily distinguished by larger siyahs and the presence of prominent string bridges.

== Pre-Qing Mongol bow ==
The bows that were used during the rule of Genghis Khan were smaller than the modern Manchu-derived weapons used at most Naadam. Paintings as well as at least one surviving example of a 13th-century Mongol bow from Tsagaan-Khad demonstrate that the medieval Mongolian bows had smaller siyahs and much less prominent leather string bridges.

Mongol bows were the main weapons of the Mongol warriors in this period. Warriors carried at least 2 bows, a long one for long-range work and a shorter one for mounted combat.

== Influence of the Qing dynasty ==
From the 17th to the 20th century, horseback archery in Mongolia (and around the world) declined in prominence in proportion to the availability of firearms. Contemporary depictions of the 1768 Battle of Khorgos between the Qing dynasty and the Western Mongolian Dzungars show the mounted Dzungars primarily armed with muskets.

The old Mongolian bows that were used during the times of Genghis Khan were smaller than the modern weapons used at most Naadam festivals today.

Mongols performing archery may be continuous, but Mongol bows are not. Mongol style bows were officially outlawed in Mongolia after it was conquered by the Manchu dynasty. Manchu soldiers entered gers and broke any Mongol bows that they found, and the Qing forced Mongols to use the Manchu bow in their archery. Over two hundred years of enforcement these changes stuck and the ancient art of Mongol bow making was nearly lost along with a majority of archery games and traditions. Modern Mongolian bows are derived from the Chinese / Manchu tradition; they are larger and have string bridges. Archery came back to Naadam and was organized for the first time in many years by the newly founded Mongolian National Archery Association (1940). This was the beginning of the sports standardization in the modern era.

== Construction ==
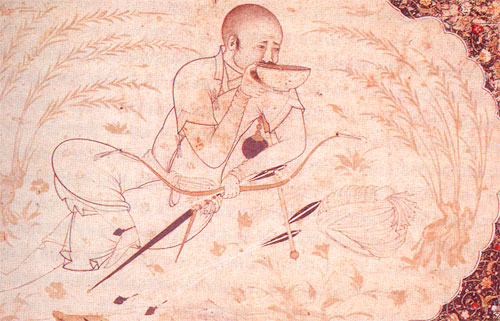
Hulagu Khan with the older composite bow used during the time of the Mongol conquest. It is smaller in size and has no string bridges.

Ancient and modern Mongol bows are part of the Asian composite bow tradition. The core is bamboo, with horn on the belly (facing towards the archer) and sinew on the back, bound together with animal glue. As animal glue is dissolved by water, composite bows may be ruined by rain or excess humidity; a wrapper of (waterproof) birch bark may give limited protection from moisture and from mechanical damage. The bow is usually stored in a leather case for protection when not in use.

== The arrows ==
Birch is a typical material for arrows. The normal length of an arrow is between 80 and 100 cm (30 and 40 inches), and the shaft's diameter is around 1 cm (0.5 inches).

As for fletchings, crane tail feathers are favored, but tail feathers of all birds are usable. Eagle feathers make a particularly prized arrow, but eagle feathers are relatively difficult to acquire. Feathers taken from wings are said to flow less smoothly through the air, so if given the choice, tail feathers are picked. The Mongols characteristically pay close attention to the minutest details; the placement of the fletchings in relation to their size, and what part of the bird the feathers originate from, are of great importance for correct rotation and good balance in the air. Consequently, these factors are painstakingly considered when making arrows after the Old Mongol standard.

Arrowheads can be everything from wide metal blades used for big game (or in war) to bone and wooden points, which are used for hunting birds and small animals. The high impact force of this bow ensures that a bony point will be lethal when hitting the body of a smaller animal. In addition to these kinds of arrows, whistling arrows are useful during hunting, because the effect on animals of an arrow whistling away high above the ground is often to make it stop, curious to see what is in the air. This gives the hunter time to launch a second arrow with lethal intent. These whistling arrows are made by inserting an arrowhead of bone in which hollow channels have been created. When shot, such arrowheads make a very audible sound through the air.

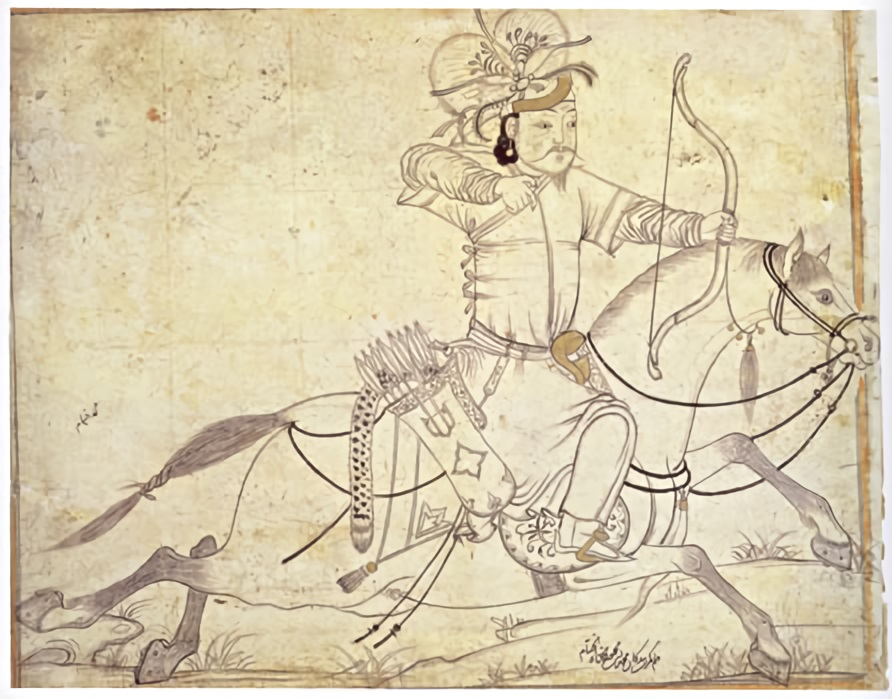
A Timurid depiction of a Mongol archer (Signed (lower right): Muhammad ibn Mahmudshah al-Khayyam, early 15th century).

== Range ==
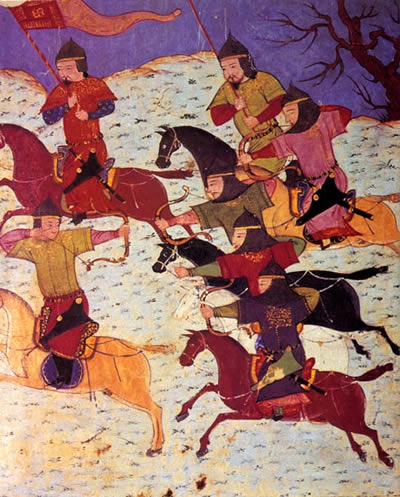
Mongol cavalrymen during the time of the Mongol conquest used a smaller bow suitable for horse archery.

An inscription thought to be from 1226 was found on a stone stele in Nerchinsk, Siberia. It may have said: "While Chinggis Khan was holding an assembly of Mongolian dignitaries, after his conquest of Sartaul (Khwarezm), Esungge (son of Genghis Khan's younger brother) shot a target at 335 alds (536 m or 586 yards)".

== Thumb draw and release ==
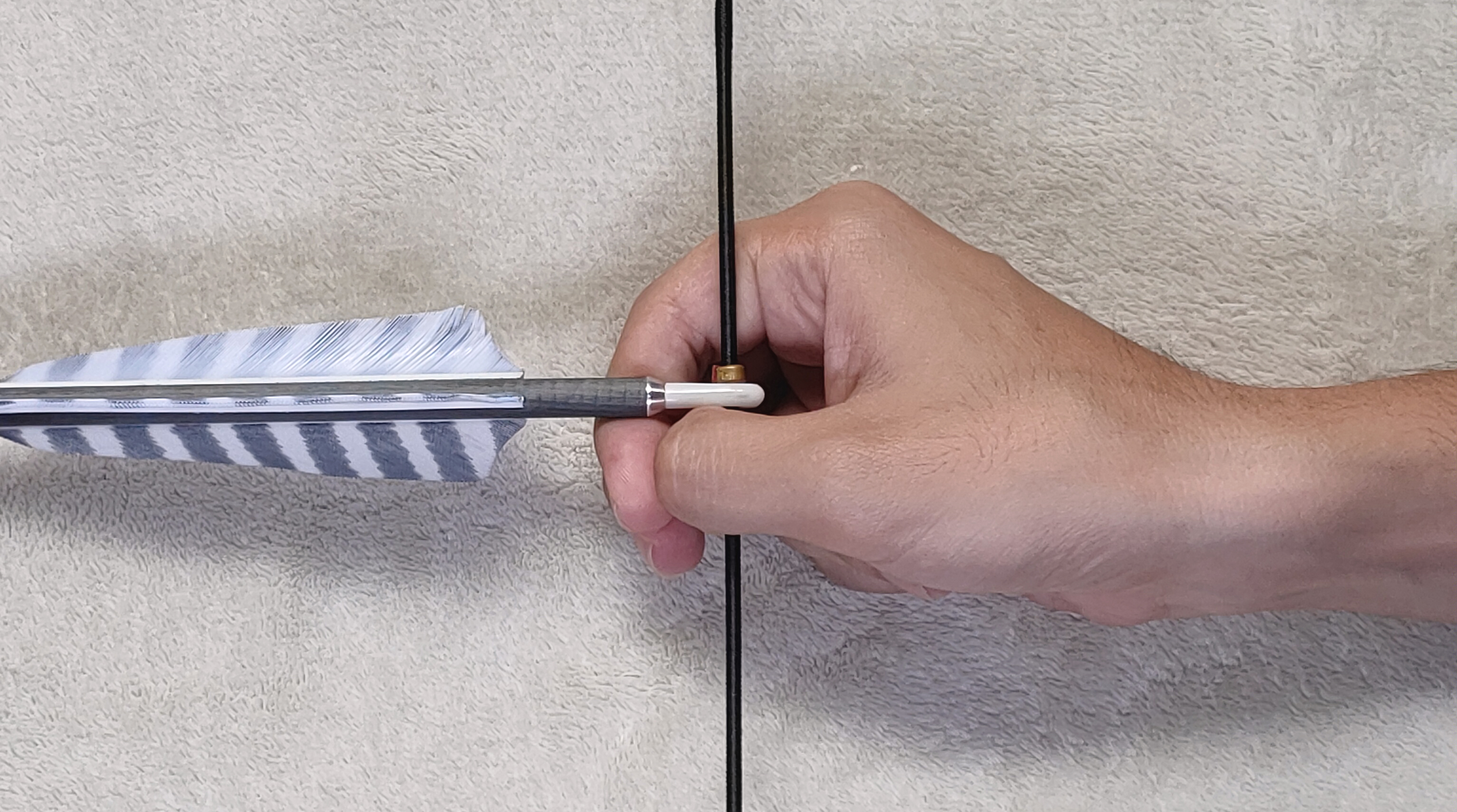
A right-handed Mongolian draw.

The thumb draw, which was mistakenly called the Mongolian draw, but is neither unique nor invented by Mongolians, uses only the thumb, the strongest single digit, to grasp the string. Around the back of the thumb, the index and/or middle fingers reinforce the grip. This is traditional across the Asian steppes, as well as in Korea, Japan, Tibet, China, Turkey, India, and recent Persia. It was also used by Ishi, the last of the Yana, with his short bows.

It gives a narrower grip on the string, as only one digit is used, and this may help to avoid "string pinch" with shorter bows, such as the composite bows normally used from horseback. Mongol archers would wear a thumb ring made from leather, bone, horn, and in some cases silver to protect the thumb. It may also avoid a problem occasionally faced by archers using the Mediterranean release, when the three fingers do not release at exactly the same time and thus foul the draw.

This release is normally used with the arrow on the right side of the bow for a right-handed archer who holds the bow in the left hand and draws with the right; a left-handed archer will usually reverse this arrangement.

== See also ==
- Composite bow
- Turkish bow
- Korean bow
- Bow draw
- Bow string
- Mounted archery

== Bibliography ==
- Batkhui︠a︡g, S. Mongol u̇ndėsniĭ suryn kharvaany onol, arga zu̇ĭ. Ulaanbaatar Khot: Urlakh Ėrdėm, 2006. Summary: Work on archery, one of Mongolia's three national sports.
- Cojžilžav, Chönchörijn, Žančivyn Bataa, and Cogtbaataryn Tuvaanžav. Mongolyn ündesnij sur charvaa. Ulaanbaatar: Ėkimto, 2013. Summary: On Mongolian archery: the sport as practiced in Mongolia.
- Martin, H. Desmond. "The Mongol Army." Journal of the Royal Asiatic Society of Great Britain and Ireland, no. 1 (1943): 46–85. Accessed March 17, 2020. www.jstor.org/stable/25221891.
- MAY TIMOTHY. Mongol warfare in the pre-dissolution period. Золотоордынское Обозрение. 6-20. Россия, Казань: Государственное бюджетное учреждение «Институт истории имени Шигабутдина Марджани Академии наук Республики Татарстан», 2015. Abstract: Although the Mongols used many of the tactics and strategies that steppe nomads had used for centuries, the Mongols refined steppe warfare so that this style of warfare reached its apogee during the Mongol Empire. Furthermore, the Mongols developed a style of warfare that made them possibly the greatest military force in history. This work examines several facets of the pre-dissolution period (1200-1260). With the dissolution of the Mongol Empire, Mongol warfare once again changed. In some areas it remained complex while in others it regressed to traditional forces of steppe warfare, still potent but not as effective as the pre-dissolution period.
- Otgonbai︠a︡r, Khu̇rėn-Alagiĭn, and Tȯmȯrkhu̇u̇giĭn Batmȯnkh. Mongol suryn kharvaany tovchoon: 1921-2008. Ulaanbaatar: Uran Bu̇tėėliĭn "Anir Ėgshig" Nėgdėl, 2008. Summary: On archery in Mongolia; includes history and winners of national competitions, with biographical material.
- Reid, Robert W. 1992. "Mongolian Weaponry in "The Secret History of the Mongols". Mongolian Studies. 15: 85–95.
- Serruys, Henry. "A Note on Arrows and Oaths among the Mongols." Journal of the American Oriental Society 78, no. 4 (1958): 279–94. Accessed March 18, 2020. doi:10.2307/595792.
- Jason Wayne Beever (USA) and Zoran Pavlović. 2017. "The Modern Reproduction of a Mongol Era Bow Based on Historical Facts and Ancient Technology Research." 2017/2. Exarc.net. Abstract: This bow was a concept, commissioned from Ulrich Velthuysen, a Swedish archer. This horn bow could be classified as a post-conquest design from early 14th century AD Mongolia. In this article, I will describe, step-by-step, the gathering and processing of materials, and the construction of this design of horn bow. Unfortunately, there are only a few pictorial representations of what bows may have looked like during 14th century AD Mongolia; although, there are many other variations of bows during this time period with similar characteristics. Bow styles varied from bowyer to bowyer, so while bowyers duplicated fundamentals of construction, there were many different methods of construction, and individual styles of bow-shaping. This article also aims to provide a historical background to a modern 2016 reproduction of a composite horn bow dating from the period of the Mongol expansion. The overview of the bow design includes all types of available and valid sources that speak in favour of its construction and other historical solutions these construction decisions were based upon.
