= Raymond-Guilhem de Caupenne =

14th century French noble

Raymond-Guilhem de Caupenne (died 1374), Seigneur of Caupenne, was a French noble who took part in the Hundred Years War. He led the defense of Saint-Jean-d'Angély in 1351 against a French force laying siege to the town. He died in 1374.

== Life ==
Raymond-Guilhem was the son of Arnaud de Caupenne, seigneur de Caupenne, Senschal of Agenais and Géraude de Navailles. Firstly supporting the French side in 1342, he appears to have switched to the English side, receiving in May 1348 several domains of King Edward III of England. He was the garrison commander in the defense of Saint-Jean-d'Angély in 1351 against a French force laying siege to the town. The town capitulated upon the personal appearance of King John II of France at the siege. Raymond-Guilhem died in 1374.

== Marriage and issue ==
Raymond-Guilhem married Isabeau de Laborde in 1338, they are known to have had a son Archambaud de Caupenne.
