= Battle of Ardres =

Battle during the Hundred Years' War

- Part of Hundred Years' War
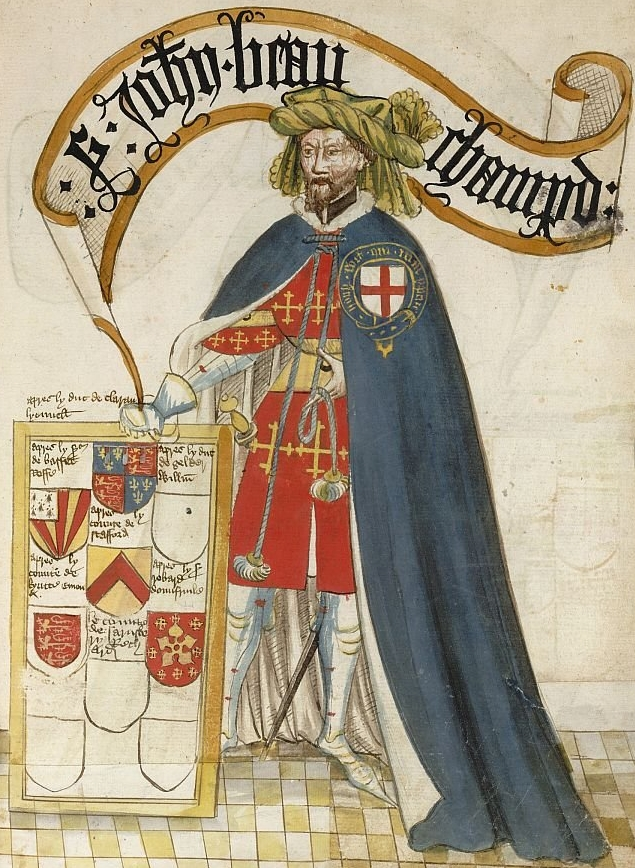
- Painting of Beauchamp made in 1430
Date	8 June 1351
Location	Ardres, Pas-de-Calais, France 50°51′20″N 1°58′42″E
Result	French victory

Belligerents
Kingdom of France	Kingdom of England

Commanders and leaders
Édouard I of Beaujeu †	John de Beauchamp (POW)

Strength
1,500 men-at-arms	300 men-at-arms 300 mounted archers

Casualties and losses
Unknown	Unknown

The battle of Ardres was a battle that took place on 8 June 1351 by forces from the Kingdom of France, led by Édouard I de Beaujeu, near the English-held town of Ardres, in a ditch in a river bend, as a part of the Hundred Years' War. In the battle Beajeau was killed and the English commander, John de Beauchamp was captured.

== Background ==
Since the Norman Conquest of England in 1066, English monarchs had held titles and lands within France, the possession of which made them vassals of the kings of France. The status of the English kings' French fiefs was a major source of conflict between the two monarchies throughout the Middle Ages. Following a series of disagreements between Philip VI of France (r. 1328–1350) and Edward III of England (r. 1327–1377), on 24 May 1337 Philip's Great Council in Paris agreed that the Duchy of Aquitaine, modern-day Gascony, should be taken back into Philip's hands on the ground that Edward was in breach of his obligations as a vassal. This marked the start of the Hundred Years' War, which was to last 116 years.

== Battle ==
In early June 1351, a large French force led by Édouard I de Beaujeu and Geoffroi de Charny, came upon a sizeable English raiding party under the command of John de Beauchamp, Calais' military governor. The English forces amounted to 300 men-at-arms and 300 mounted archers from the Saint-Omer garrison. As the battle started, the French surrounded the English and began to repeatedly attack. After two unsuccessful French ambushes, de Beauchamp sent his forces back to Calais with the wounded and plunder. They were followed by the French, and on 8 June he decided to fight the 1,500 men-at-arms pursuing them. He set up his forces in a river bend behind a wide ditch to have a defensive position. The river where the battle took place was near the English-held town of Ardres. Beaujeu was killed at the start of the battle. However, the larger French force advanced on foot towards the English anyways. The English archers ran out of arrows and decided to charge the French. However, this did not have any substantial effect, as soon after the heavily wounded English forces were defeated by a French cavalry reinforcement from Saint-Omer. Beauchamp was captured along with many of his men, and the French won the battle.

== Aftermath ==
After a large amount of the Calais garrison's men were killed or captured in the battle, it was left very very weakened and susceptible to French capture. However the French were not able to capitalize on this before reinforcements from the garrison arrived.

== Citations and sources ==
=== Sources ===
- Crowcroft, Robert & Cannon, John (2015). "Gascony". The Oxford Companion to British History. Oxford: Oxford University Press. p. 389. ISBN 978-0199677832.
- Harris, Robin (1994). Valois Guyenne. Royal Historical Society Studies in History. Vol. 71. London: Boydell Press. ISBN 978-0861932269.
- Prestwich, M. (13 September 2007). Plantagenet England 1225–1360. Oxford: Oxford University Press. ISBN 978-0199226870.
- Sumption, Jonathan (1990). Trial by Battle. London: Faber and Faber. ISBN 978-0571200955.
- Wilson, Ian (2021). The Book of Geoffroi de Charny. Boydell Press. ISBN 978-1783275854.
- Rogers, Clifford J. (2010). The Oxford Encyclopedia of Medieval Warfare and Military Technology. Oxford University Press. ISBN 978-1783275854.
