= Sagittarii =

Roman archers

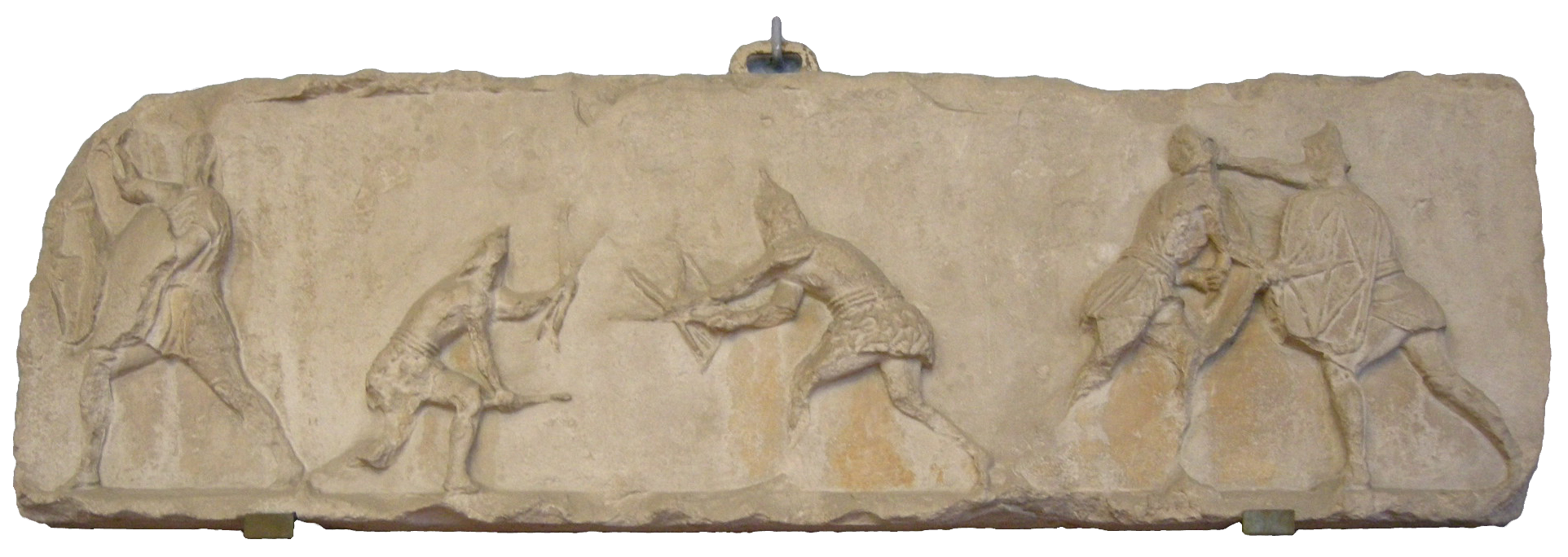
Sagittarii combat

Sagittarii (Latin, plural form of sagittarius) is the Latin term for archers. The term sagittariorum in the title of an infantry or cavalry unit indicated a specialized archer regiment. Regular auxiliary units of foot and horse archers appeared in the Roman army during the early empire. During the Principate roughly two thirds of all archers were on foot and one third were horse archers. Mercenary foot archers already served with the Roman republican army, but horse archers were only introduced after the Romans came into conflict with Eastern armies that relied heavily on mounted archery in the 1st century BC, most notably the Parthians, whose mounted archers were decisive for Crassus's major defeat in the Battle of Carrhae. Since the time of Augustus however, Romans and Italians were also levied as dedicated archers. In the early 1st century BC horse archers were already in widespread use and even supported Roman campaigns against the Germanic tribes in Central Europe.

The normal weapon of Roman archers, both infantry and cavalry units, was the composite bow, although Vegetius recommended training recruits "arcubus ligneis" (with wooden bows), which may have been made in the northern European self bow tradition. It has been suggested that most Roman composite bows may have been asymmetric, with lower limbs shorter than the upper.

By the 5th century, there were numerous Roman cavalry regiments trained to use the bow as a supplement to their swords and lances, but the sagittarii appear to have used the bow as their primary rather than supplemental weapon. According to the Notitia Dignitatum, most units of sagittarii, especially equites sagittarii, were in the Eastern empire or in Africa. Possibly some of the other cavalry regiments there carried bows as back-up weapons, but were not the dedicated mounted archers that the sagittarii were. The use of bows as primary weapons probably originated in the East in the later 4th and earlier 5th centuries to help the Roman army counter Persian and Hunnic bow-armed cavalry.

By the time of Procopius's histories and Maurikios's Strategikon, the main effective field arm of Roman armies was cavalry, many of them armed with bows. After the fall of the Western empire, Eastern Roman armies maintained their tradition of horse archery for centuries.

== See also ==
- Roman military personal equipment
- List of Roman army unit types
