= Mounted archery =

Using a bow and arrow while riding from horseback

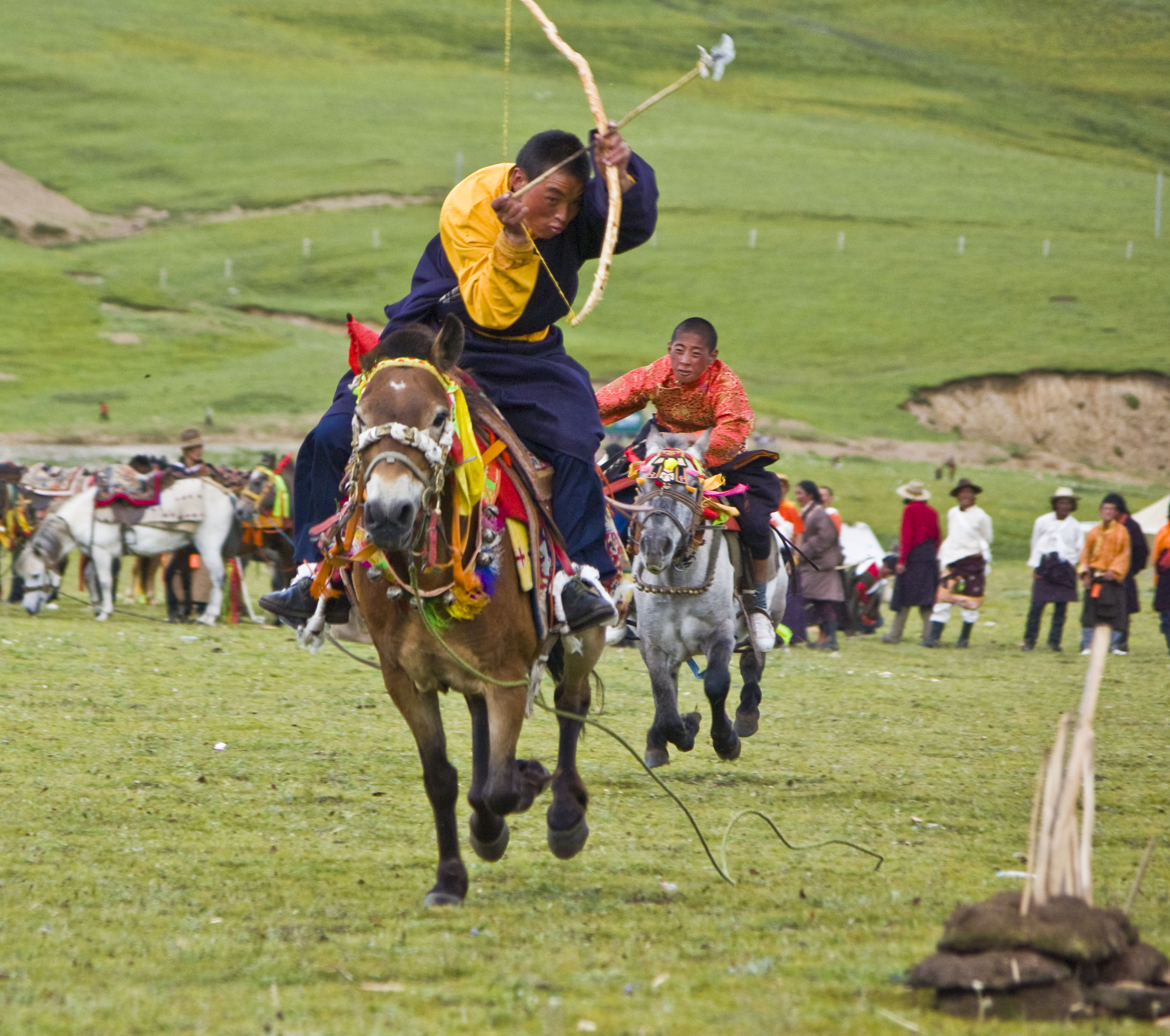
Mounted archery in Tibet.

Mounted archery is a form of archery that involves shooting arrows while on horseback. A horse archer is a person who does mounted archery. Archery has occasionally been used from the backs of other riding animals. In large open areas, mounted archery was a highly successful technique for hunting, for protecting herds, and for war. It was a defining characteristic of the Eurasian nomads during antiquity and the medieval period, as well as the Iranian peoples such as the Alans, Sarmatians, Cimmerians, Scythians, Massagetae, Parthians, and Persians in Antiquity, and by the Hungarians, Mongols, Chinese, and Turkic peoples during the Middle Ages. The expansion of these cultures have had a great influence on other geographical regions including Eastern Europe, West Asia, and East Asia. In East Asia, horse archery came to be particularly honored in the samurai tradition of Japan, where horse archery is called Yabusame.

The term mounted archer occurs in medieval English sources to describe a soldier who rode to battle but who dismounted to shoot, similar to the later firearm-equipped dragoons. Horse archer is the term used more specifically to describe a warrior who shoots from the saddle at the gallop. Another term, "horseback archery", has crept into modern use.

Horse archery developed separately among the people of the South American pampas and the North American prairies following the introduction of domesticated horses to the continent; the Comanches were especially skilled.

== Basic features ==
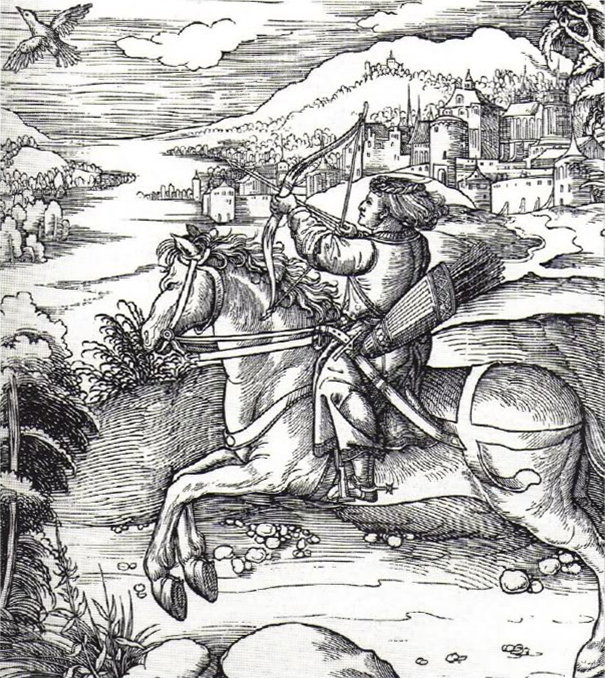
Young prince (later Holy Roman Emperor Maximilian I) hunting for birds as a horsed archer. Woodcut by Albrecht Dürer.

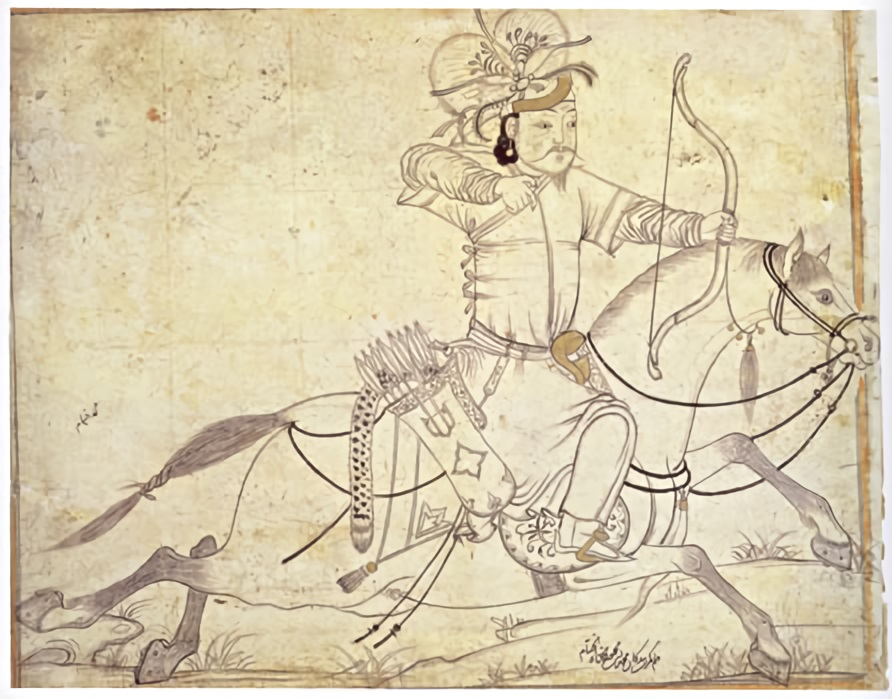
A Timurid drawing of an Ilkhanid horse archer. Signed (lower right) Muhammad ibn Mahmudshah al-Khayyam Iran, early 15th century. Ink and gold on paper.

Since using a bow requires the rider to let go of the reins with both hands, horse archers need superb equestrian skills if they are to shoot on the move. The natives of large grassland areas used horse archery for hunting, for protecting their herds, and for war. Horse archery was for many groups a basic survival skill, and additionally made each able-bodied man, at need, a highly mobile warrior. The buffalo hunts of the North American prairies may be the best-recorded examples of bowhunting by horse archers.

In battle, light horse archers were typically skirmishers, lightly armed missile troops capable of moving swiftly to avoid close combat or to deliver a rapid blow to the flanks or rear of the foe. Captain Robert G. Carter described the experience of facing Quanah Parker's forces: "an irregular line of swirling warriors, all rapidly moving in right and left hand circles.. while advancing, to the right or left, and as rapidly concentrating... in the centre... and their falling back in the same manner...all was most puzzling to our... veterans who had never witnessed such tactical maneuvers, or such a flexible line of skirmishers".

In the tactic of the Parthian shot the rider would retreat from the enemy while turning his upper body and shooting backward. Due to the superior speed of mounted archers, troops under attack from horse archers were unable to respond to the threat if they did not have ranged weapons of their own. Constant harassment would result in casualties, morale drop and disruption of the formation. Any attempts to charge the archers would also slow the entire army down.

An example of these tactics comes from an attack on Comanche horse archers by a group of Texas Rangers, who were saved by their muzzle-loading firearms and by a convenient terrain feature. Fifty Rangers armed with guns met about 20 Comanche hunters who were hunting buffalo and attacked them. The Comanches fled, easily keeping clear of the Rangers, for several miles across the open prairie. They led the Rangers into a stronger force of two hundred. The Rangers immediately retreated, only to discover they had committed a classic error in fighting mounted archers: the Comanches pursued in turn, able to shoot what seemed like clouds of arrows. The Rangers found a ravine where they could shoot at the Comanche from cover. The horse archers did not charge but kept the Rangers under siege until seven of them were dead or dying, whereupon the Rangers retreated but claimed victory.

=== Heavy horse archers ===
Horse archers may be either light, such as Scythian, Hun, Parthian, Cuman, or Pecheneg horsemen, or heavy, such as Byzantine kavallarioi, Turkish timariots, Russian druzhina and Japanese samurai. Heavy horse archers typically fought as formed units. Instead of harassing without ever making contact, they shot in volleys, weakening the enemy before they charged. In addition to bows, they often also carried close combat weapons, such as lances or spears. Some nations, like medieval Mongols, Hungarians and Cumans, fielded both light and heavy horse archers. In some armies, such as those of the Parthians, Palmyrans, and the Teutonic Order of Knights, the mounted troops consisted of both super-heavy troops (cataphracts and knights) without bows, and light horse archers.

== Appearance in history ==
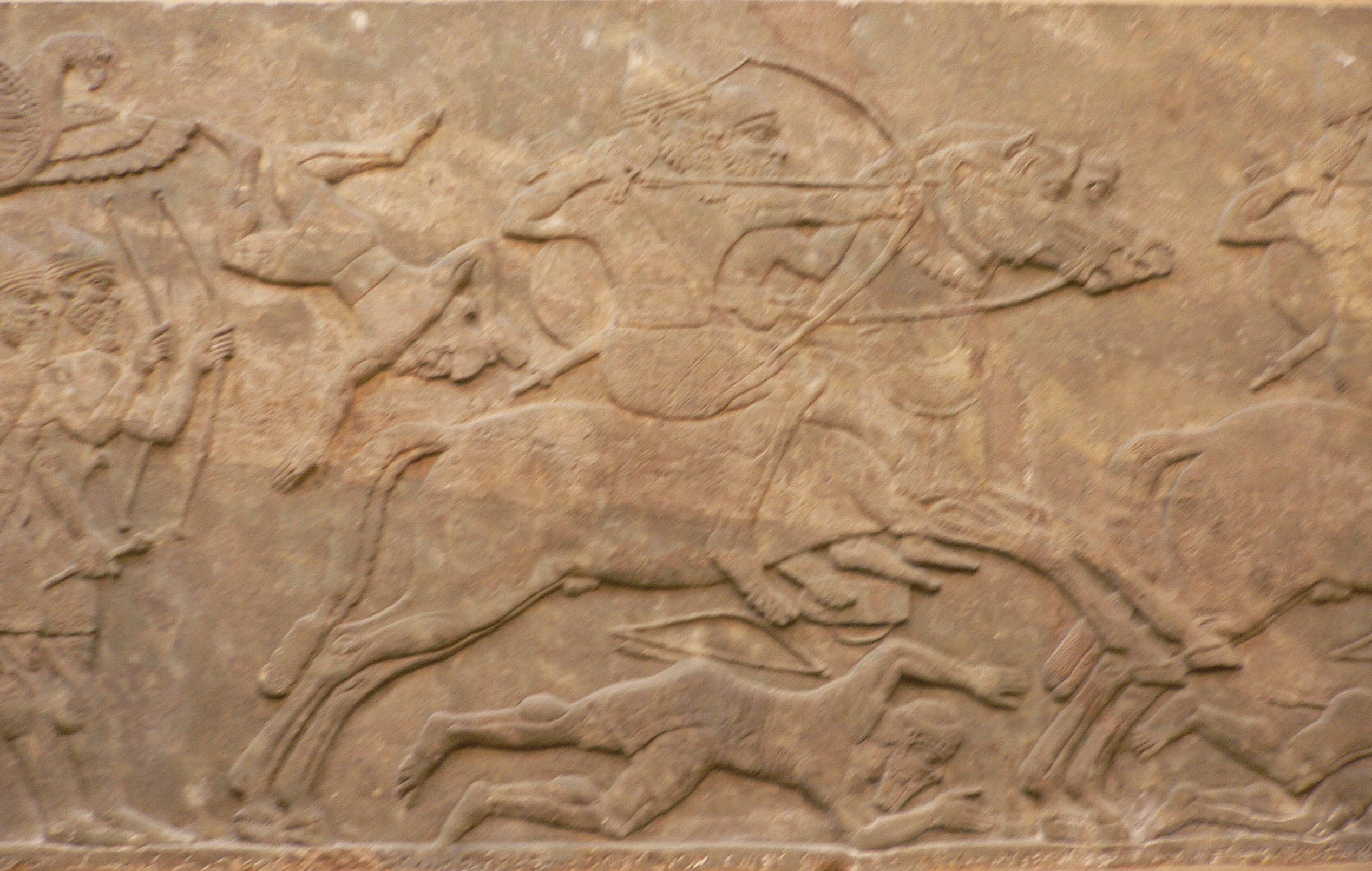
Assyrian relief of a mounted archer

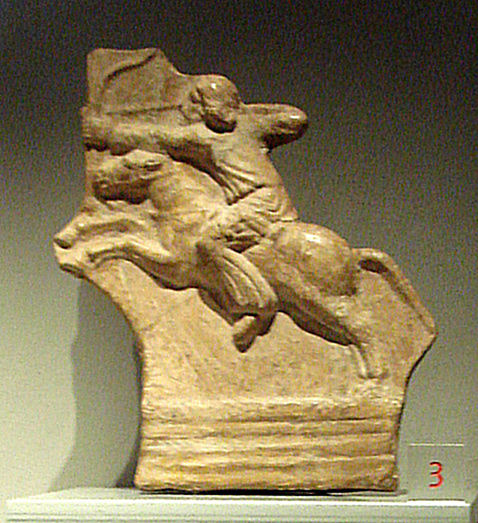
Parthian horse archer shooting at full gallop, undated relief at the Palazzo Madama, Turin.

Horse archery first developed during the Iron Age, gradually replacing the Bronze Age chariot.

The earliest depictions are found in the artwork of the Neo-Assyrian Empire of about the 9th century BC and reflect the incursions of the early Iranian peoples.

Early horse archery, depicted on the Assyrian carvings, involved two riders, one controlling both horses while the second shot. Heavy horse archers first appeared in the Assyrian army in the 7th century BC after abandoning chariot warfare and formed a link between light skirmishing cavalrymen and heavy cataphract cavalry. The heavy horse archers usually had mail or lamellar armor and helmets, and sometimes even their horses were armored.

Skirmishing requires vast areas of free space to run, maneuver, and flee, and if the terrain is close, light horse archers can be charged and defeated easily. Light horse archers are also very vulnerable to foot archers and crossbowmen, who are smaller targets and can outshoot horsemen. Large armies very seldom relied solely on skirmishing horse archers, but there are many examples of victories in which horse archers played a leading part. The Roman general Crassus led a large army, with inadequate cavalry and missile troops, to catastrophe against Parthian horse archers and cataphracts at the Battle of Carrhae. The Persian king Darius the Great led a campaign against the mounted Scythians, who refused to engage in pitched battle; Darius conquered and occupied land but lost enough troops and supplies that he was compelled to withdraw. Darius, however, kept the lands he had conquered.

According to the Greek historian Herodotus, the Persian general Mardonius used horse archers to attack and harass his opponents during the Battle of Plataea, which was won by the Greeks. Philip of Macedon scored an epic victory against the Scythians residing north of the Danube, killing their king, Ateas, and causing their kingdom to fall apart thereafter. Alexander the Great defeated Scythians/Sakas in 329 BC at the Battle of Jaxartes, at the Syr Darya river. Later on, Alexander himself used mounted archers recruited among the Scythians and Dahae, during the Greek invasion of India.

The Roman Empire and its military also had extensive use of horse archers after their conflict with eastern armies that relied heavily on mounted archery in the 1st century BC. They had regiments such as the Equites Sagittarii, who acted as Rome's horse archers in combat. The Crusaders used conscripted cavalry and horse archers known as the Turcopole, made up of mostly Greek and Turks.

Heavy horse archers, instead of skirmishing and hit-and-run tactics, formed in disciplined formations and units, sometimes intermixed with lancers as in Byzantine and Turkish armies, and shot as volleys instead of shooting as individuals. The usual tactic was to first shoot five or six volleys at the enemy to weaken him and to disorganize them, and then charge. Heavy horse archers often carried spears or lances for close combat or formed mixed units with lancers. The Mongol armies and others included both heavy and light horse archers.

Heavy horse archers could usually outshoot their light counterparts, and because of the armor they wore, could better withstand return fire. The Russian druzhina cavalry developed as a countermeasure to the Tatar light troops. Likewise, the Turkish timariot and qapikulu were often as heavily armored as Western knights and could match the Hungarian, Albanian, and Mongol horse archers.

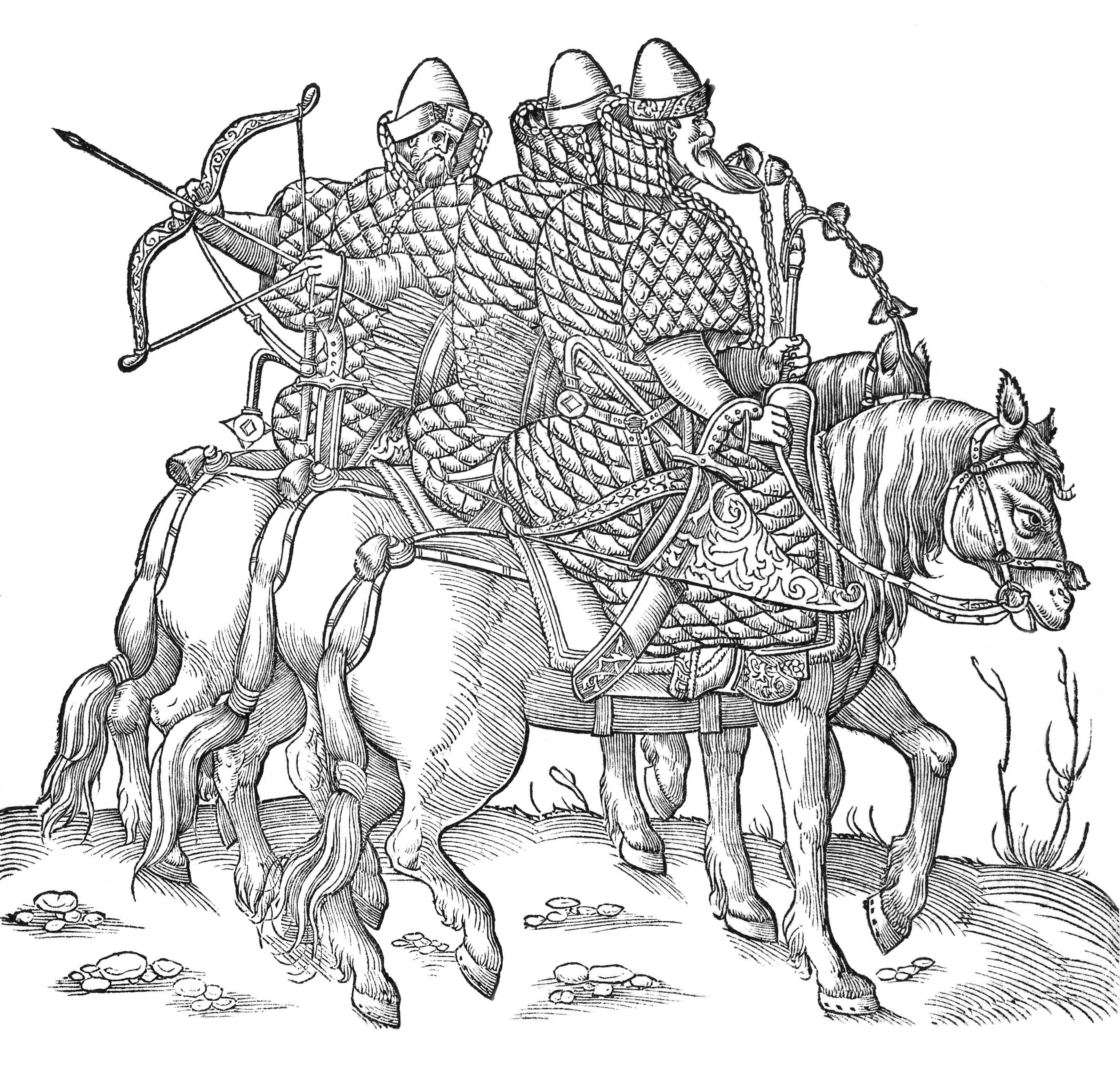
16th-century Russian cavalry.

Vietnam's mounted archers were first recorded in the 11th century. In 1017, Emperor Lý Công Uẩn of Đại Việt opened the Xa Dinh (archery school) in southern Hanoi and ordered all children of noblemen and mandarins to be trained in mounted archery. During the reign of Lý Thánh Tông, the royal guards had 20 horse archer teams, combined into 5 companies named Kỵ Xạ, Du Nỗ, Tráng Nỗ, Kính Nỗ, and Thần Tý, comprising about 2,000 skillful horse archers. They later effectively participated in the Invasion of Song China (1075 – 1076) and caused heavy casualties to the Song army. The Ly Dynasty's horse archers also fought against Champa (1069) and the Khmer Empire (1125–1130) which both were victories for Đại Việt. Later, following the decline of the Lý dynasty, most horse archer teams were disbanded.

German and Scandinavian medieval armies made extensive use of mounted crossbowmen. They would act not only as scouts and skirmishers but also protect the flanks of the knights and infantry, chasing away enemy light cavalry. When the battle was fully engaged, they would charge at the enemy flank, shoot a single devastating volley at point-blank range and then attack the enemy with swords, without reloading. In some instances, mounted crossbowmen could also reload and fire continuously on horseback if they used specific "weaker" crossbows that could be reloaded easily, as mentioned in the 13th-century Norwegian educational text Konungs skuggsjá. The invention of spanning mechanisms such as the goat's foot lever and the cranequin allowed mounted crossbowmen to reload and fire heavy crossbows on horseback.

=== Decline ===
Horse archery was usually ineffective against massed foot archery. The foot archers or crossbowmen could outshoot horse archers and a man alone is a smaller target than a man and a horse. The Crusaders countered the Turkoman horse archery with their crossbowmen, and Genoese crossbowmen were favoured mercenaries in both Mamluk and Mongol armies. Likewise the Chinese armies consisted of massed crossbowmen to counter the nomad armies. A nomad army that wanted to engage in an archery exchange with foot archers would itself normally dismount. The typical Mongol archer shot from a sitting position when dismounted.

Horse archers were eventually rendered obsolete by the maturity of firearm technology. In the 16th and subsequent centuries, various cavalry forces armed with firearms gradually started appearing. Because the conventional arquebus and musket were too awkward for a cavalryman to use, lighter weapons such as the carbine had to be developed, which could be effectively used from horseback, much in the same manner as the composite recurve bow presumably developed from earlier bows. 16th-century dragoons and carabiniers were heavier cavalry equipped only with firearms, but pistols coexisted with the composite bow, often used by the same rider, well into the 17th century in Eastern Europe, especially with the Russians, Kalmyks, Turks, and Cossacks. For many armies, mounted archery remained an effective tactical system in open country until the introduction of repeating firearms.

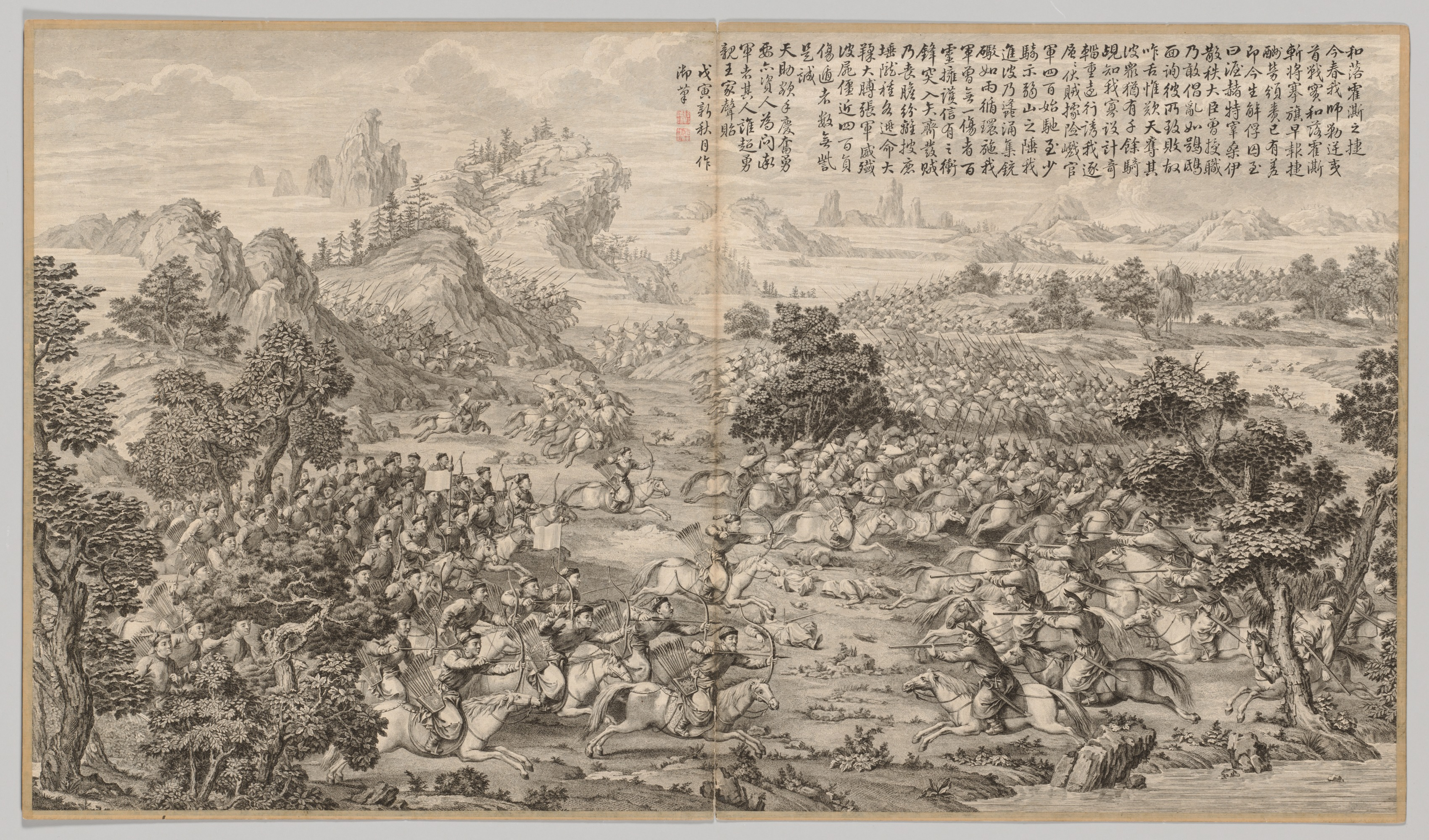
Qing Dynasty mounted archers face off against Dzungar mounted musketeers.

By the 18th century, firearms had largely displaced traditional composite bows in Mongolia, whereas in Manchuria horse archery was still highly esteemed. In the 1758 Battle of Khorgos, mounted Mongolian Dzungars troops armed with muskets faced off against Qing Dynasty mounted Manchurian, Mongolian, and Chinese archers armed with Manchu bows and firearms. The battle was won by the Qing forces. Traditional Manchurian archery continued to be practiced in China up to the overthrow of the Qing Dynasty in 1911.

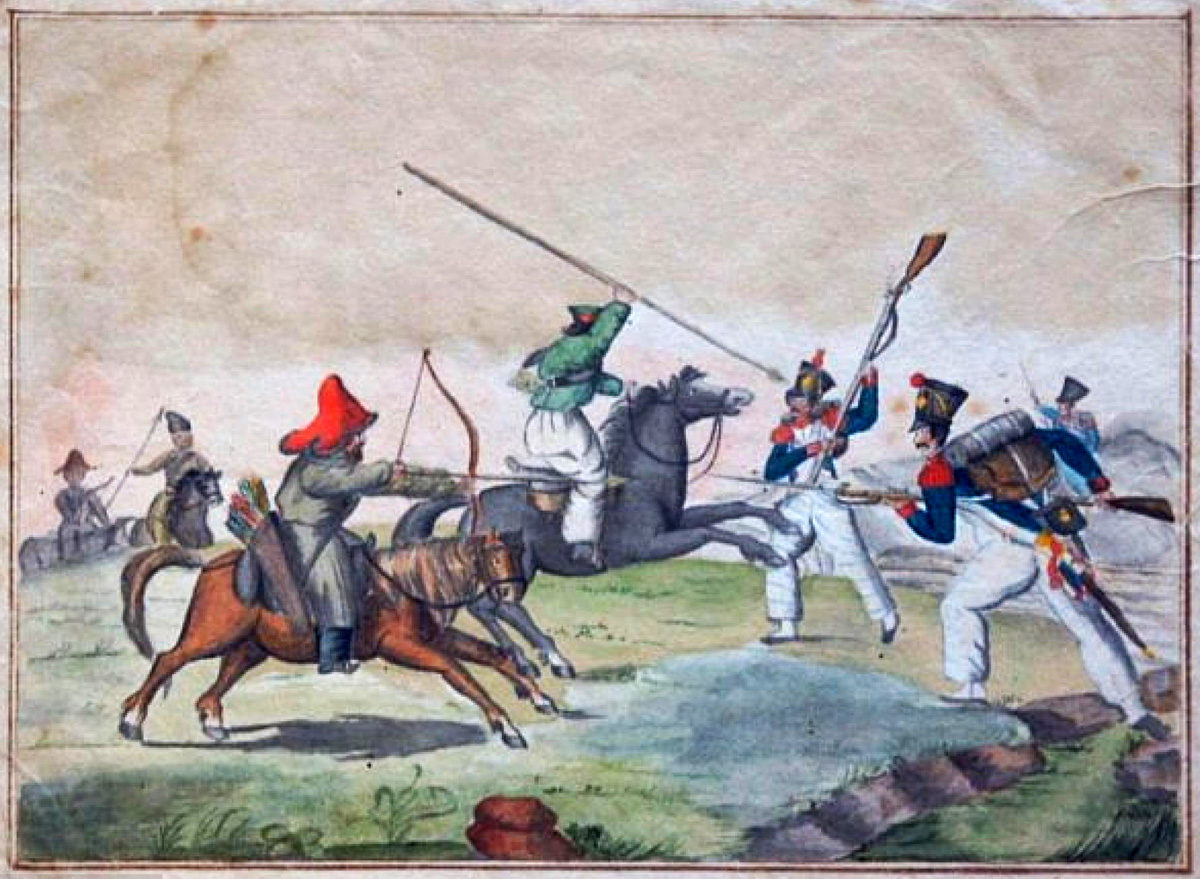
Bashkirs and Cossacks fighting French infantry with bows and lances at the Battle of Leipzig (1813).

During the Napoleonic Wars, the Russian Imperial Army deployed Cossack, Bashkir, and Kalmyk horse archers against Napoleon's forces. Baron de Marbot writes that on the eve of the Battle of Leipzig, his forces encountered mounted archers:

With much shouting, these barbarians rapidly surrounded our squadrons, against which they launched thousands of arrows which did very little damage because the Baskirs, being entirely irregulars, do not know how to form up in ranks and they go about in a mob like a flock of sheep, with the result that the riders cannot shoot horizontally without wounding or killing their comrades who are in front of them, but shoot their arrows into the air to describe an arc which will allow them to descend on the enemy. This system does not permit any accurate aim, and nine tenths of the arrows miss their target. Those that do arrive have used up in their ascent the impulse given to them by the bow, and fall only under their own weight, which is very small, so that they do not as a rule inflict any serious injuries. In fact the Baskirs, having no other arms, are undoubtedly the world’s least dangerous troops.

— The Memoirs of General Baron de Marbot

Although general de Marbot describes the horse archers in disdainful terms, the general was himself wounded in the leg by an enemy arrow, and Baskir troops were amongst the occupying troops in Paris in 1814.

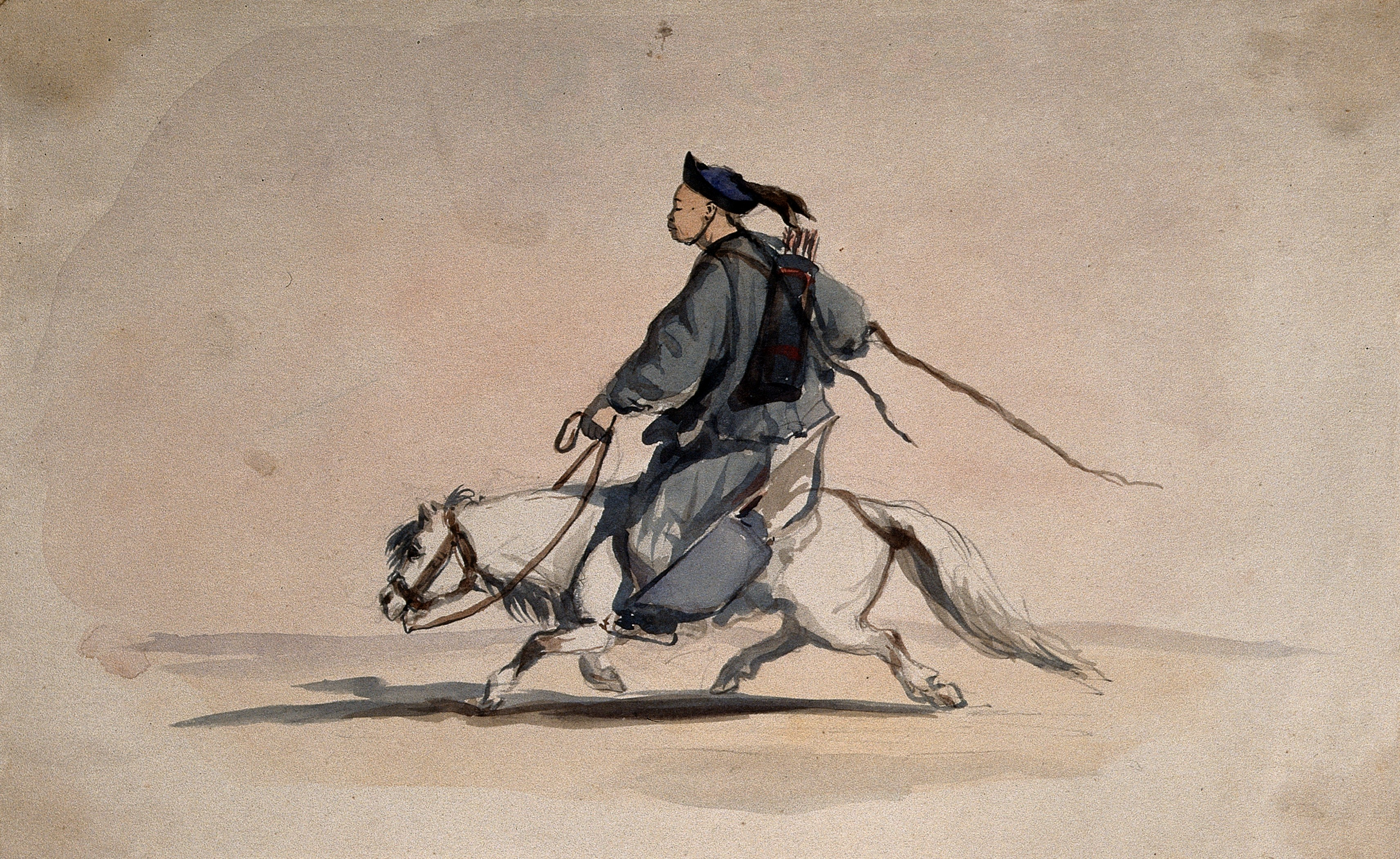
A Green Standard Army horse archer

It has been proposed that firearms began to replace bows in Europe and Russia not because firearms were superior but because they were easier to use and required less practice. However, discussing buffalo hunting in 1846, Francis Parkman noted that "the bows and arrows which the Indians use in running buffalo have many advantages over firearms, and even white men occasionally employ them." The Comanches of North America found their bows more effective than muzzle loading guns. "After... about 1800, most Comanches began to discard muskets and pistols and to rely on their older weapons." Bows were still used by Native Americans in the late American Indian Wars, but almost all warriors who had immediate access to modern repeating firearms used these guns instead.

== Technology ==
The weapon of choice for Eurasian horse archers was most commonly a composite recurve bow, because it was compact enough to shoot conveniently from a horse while retaining sufficient range and penetrating power. North Americans used short wooden bows often backed with sinew, but never developed the full three-layer composite bow.

== Modern revival ==
Horse archery and associated skills were revived in Mongolia after independence in 1921 and are displayed at festivals, in particular the Naadam. Despite the formidable history of Mongolian horse archers, the sport is very limited in Mongolia itself today and at most Naadam festivals the archery and horse-riding competitions are conducted independently; the horses are raced with one another, and the archery is traditionally practiced from a standing position rather than mounted. In the past five years a desire to revive the tradition seems to have been addressed with the foundation of the Mongolian Horseback Archery Association whose members have competed in South Korea and Europe.

== China ==
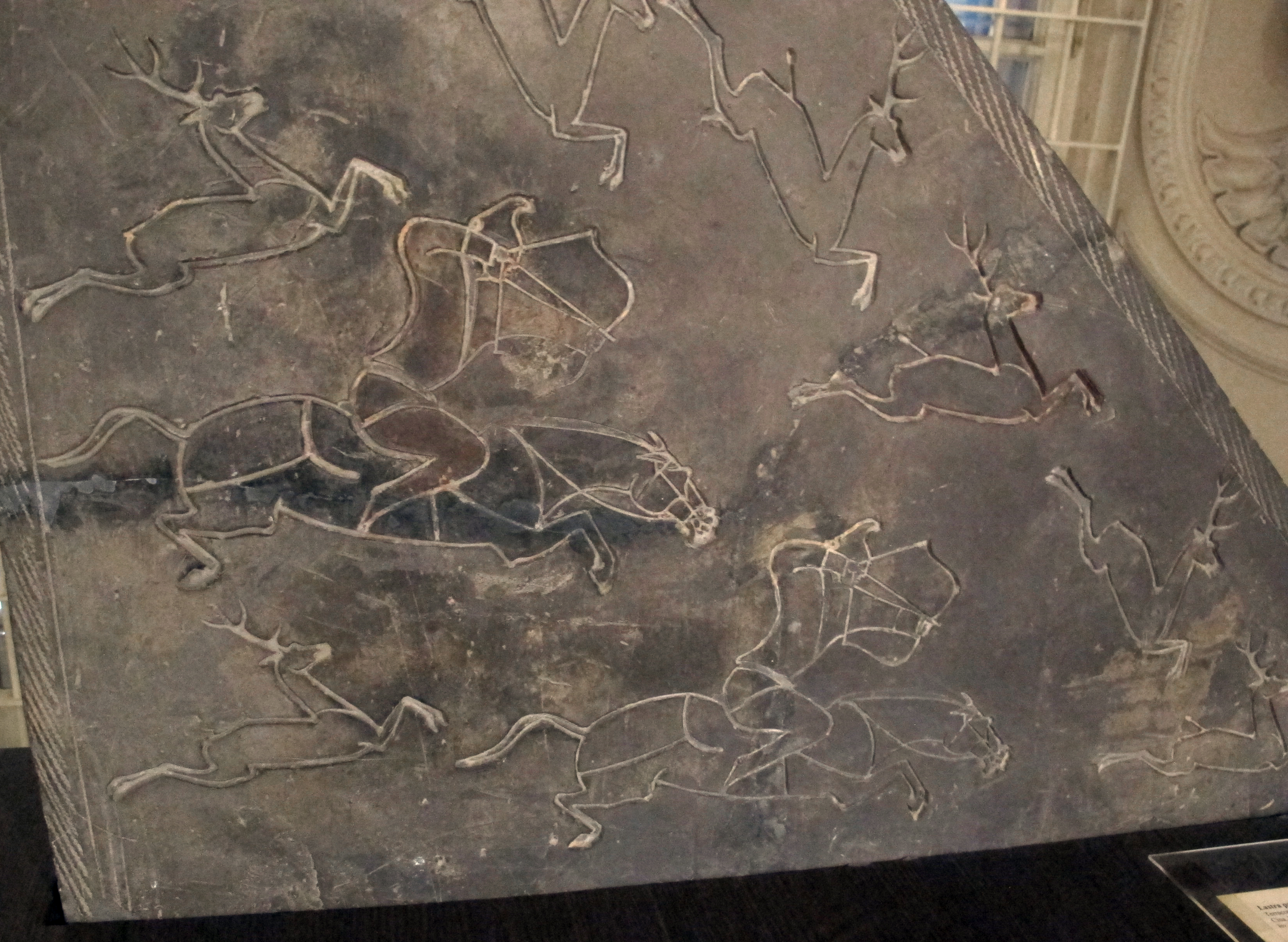
Wall fragment from a Chinese tomb, with an incised relief decoration showing a hunting scene with mounted archery, Han dynasty (202 BC - 220 AD) National Museum of Oriental Art, Rome.

Traditionally, mathematics, calligraphy, literature, equestrianism, archery, music, and rites were known in China as the Six Arts.

During the Three Kingdoms period, the influx of steppe nomads into northern China precipitated an increase in the importance of mounted archery. Training fields were constructed and hunts organised for archery practice, with emperors offering rewards for accurate shots. Contemporary accounts focused on the strength and accuracy of shots, as well as the ability to shoot accurately on both the right and left sides of the horse. Cao Cao's son Cao Pi trained in mounted archery from the age of eight, and accurately hit targets from horseback, one hundred paces away. The growing preference for horse archery from that period fully replaced heavy cavalry in Chinese military traditions by the rise of the Sui dynasty; subsequent cavalry were always primarily archers, even if they were heavily armoured.

The Ming Emperors practiced archery. The Ming dynasty's Hongwu Emperor determined that the Guozijian (Imperial Academy) emphasize instruction in equestrianism and archery in addition to law, mathematics, calligraphy and Confucian classics, and were also required in the Imperial Examinations. Archery and equestrianism were added to the examinations under Hongwu in 1370, following earlier Song dynasty precedents on how archery and equestrianism were required for non-military officials at the 武舉 College of War in 1162 under the Song Emperor Xiaozong. The area around the Meridian Gate of Nanjing was used for archery practice by guards and generals under Hongwu.

The Imperial Examinations included archery. Archery on horseback was practiced by Chinese living near the frontier. While Wang Ju's writings on archery were influential during the Ming like they were under the prior Yuan dynasty, the Ming developed new methods of archery. Jinling Tuyong showed archery in Nanjing during the Ming. Contests in archery were held in the capital for Garrison of Guard soldiers who were handpicked.

Equestrianism and archery were favored activities of the Ming's Yongle Emperor. The Hongxi emperor, although disinterested in military matters, had prowess in archery (Hongxi Emperor). Archery and equestrianism were also frequent pastimes of the Zhengde Emperor. He practiced archery and horseriding with eunuchs. Tibetan Buddhist monks, Muslim women and musicians were obtained and provided to Zhengde by his guard Ch'ien Ning, who acquainted him with the ambidextrous archer and military officer Chiang Pin. The Prince of Lu's grandson, an accomplished military commander and archer, was demoted to commoner status on a wrongful charge of treason in 1514. Archery competitions, equestrianism and calligraphy were some of the pastimes of the Wanli Emperor.

As late as the reign of the 18th century Yongzheng emperor, Tokugawa Japanese authorities still imitated Chinese techniques of mounted archery by offering rewards to Chinese officers and graduates of the military examinations to move to Nagasaki and teach their skills. These activities were recorded in the Tokugawa jikki.

== Traditional Korean ==
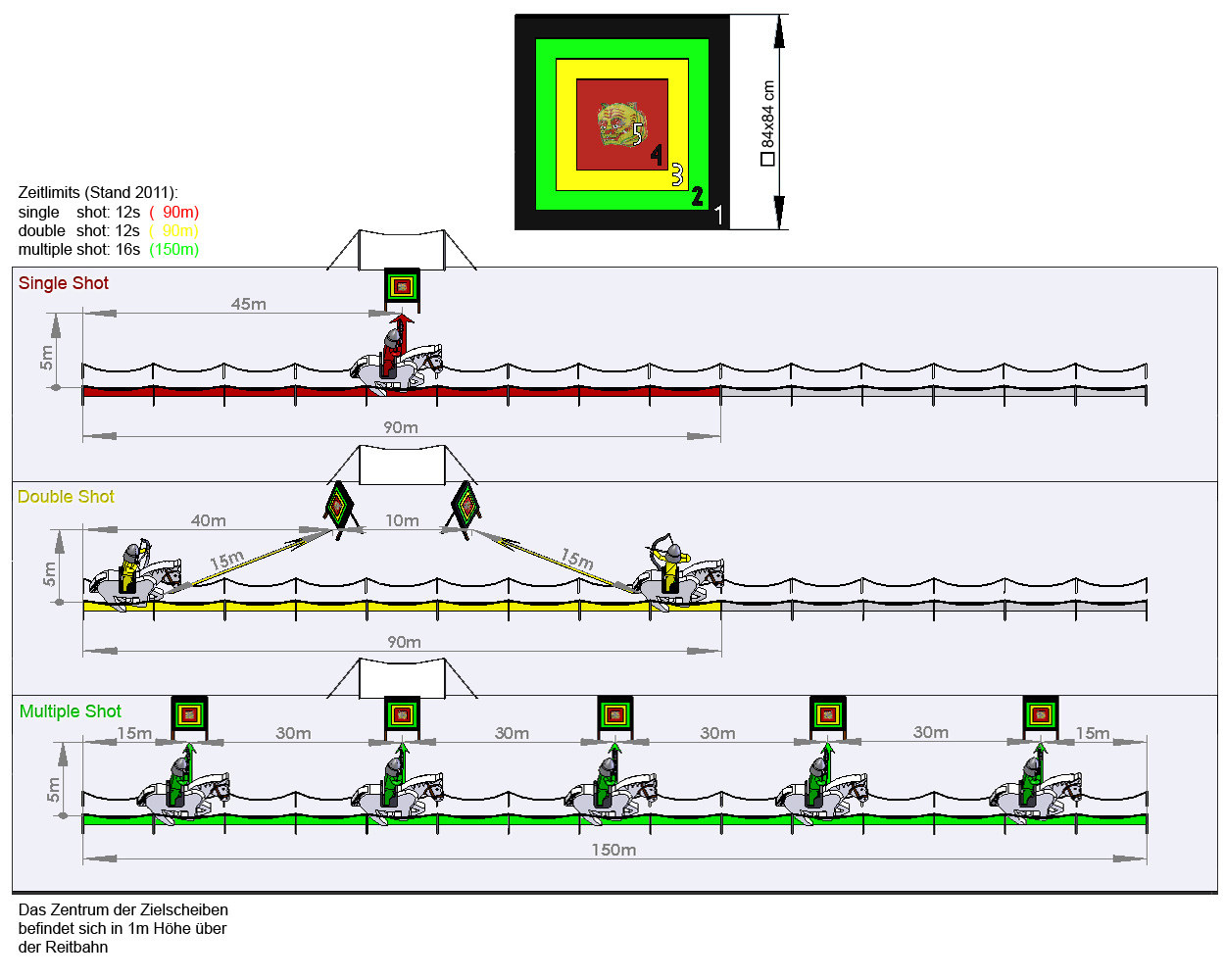
Korean-style competition.

Korea has a tradition of horse archery. In 2007, the Korean government passed a law to preserve and encourage development of traditional Korean martial arts, including horse archery.

In Korean archery competitions there are five disciplines that are competed separately. The major difference in Korean archery is that all arrows must be stowed somewhere on the archer or horse, unlike Hungarian style where the archer can take the arrows from the bow hand. Traditionally this is a quiver on the right thigh, but it may also be through a belt, a sash, a saddle quiver or even held in a boot or arm quiver.

The first competition is a single shot to the side. The track is 90 metres (300 ft) long (as in the Hungarian method) but carries only one target set back around 5–10m from the track. This has a unique fascia that consists of five square concentric rings which increase in point score from the outer to inner; the inner (often decorated with a 'Tiger' face) is worth the maximum five points. Each archer has two passes to complete, and each run has to be completed within 16 seconds (or penalty points are incurred).

The next competition is very similar but is known as the double shot which features one target in the first 30m, slightly angled forwards, and a second target in the last 30m, slightly angled backwards.

The final competition for the static targets is the serial shot which consists of five targets evenly spaced along a 110 metres (360 ft) track, approximately one target every 20 metres (66 ft) or so. In all three static target competitions, additional bonus points are awarded for style and form.

Another major difference in Korean archery style is the Mogu, or moving target competition. This consists of one rider towing a large cotton-and-bamboo ball behind their horse while another archer attempts to shoot the ball (with special turnip-headed arrows which have been dipped in ink). The archer attempts to hit the ball as many times as possible. A second Mo Gu event consists of a team of two trying to hit the target towed by a third rider. Points are awarded for how many arrows strike the ball (verified by the ink stains on the Mogu).

== Traditional Japanese ==
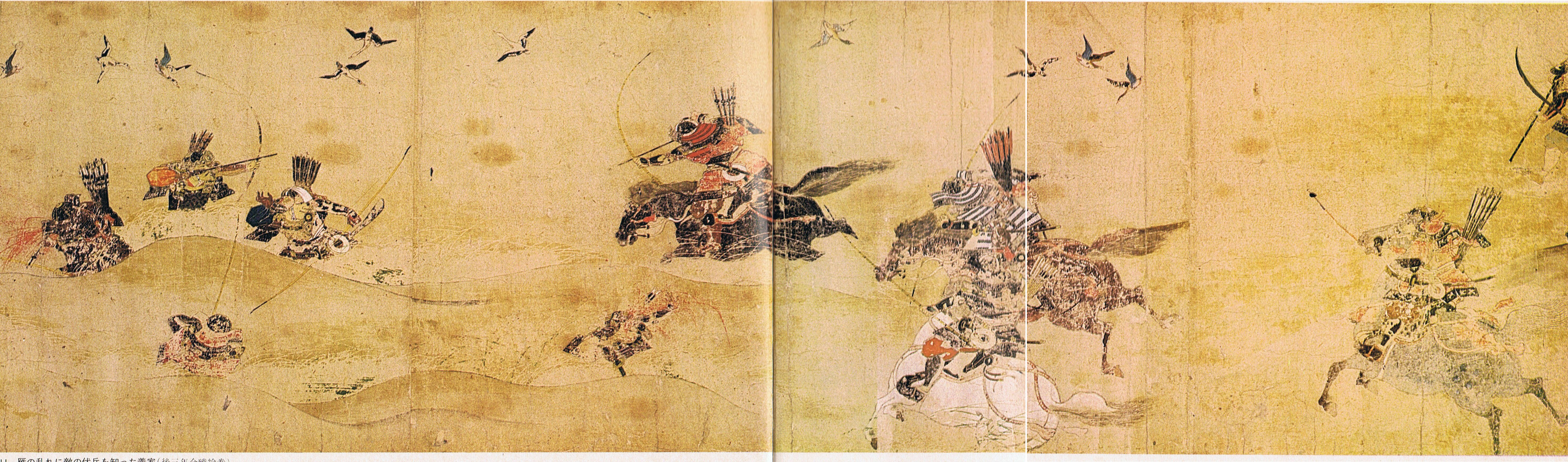
Japanese mounted archers in the Gosannen War, 14th century painting by Hidanokami Korehisa.

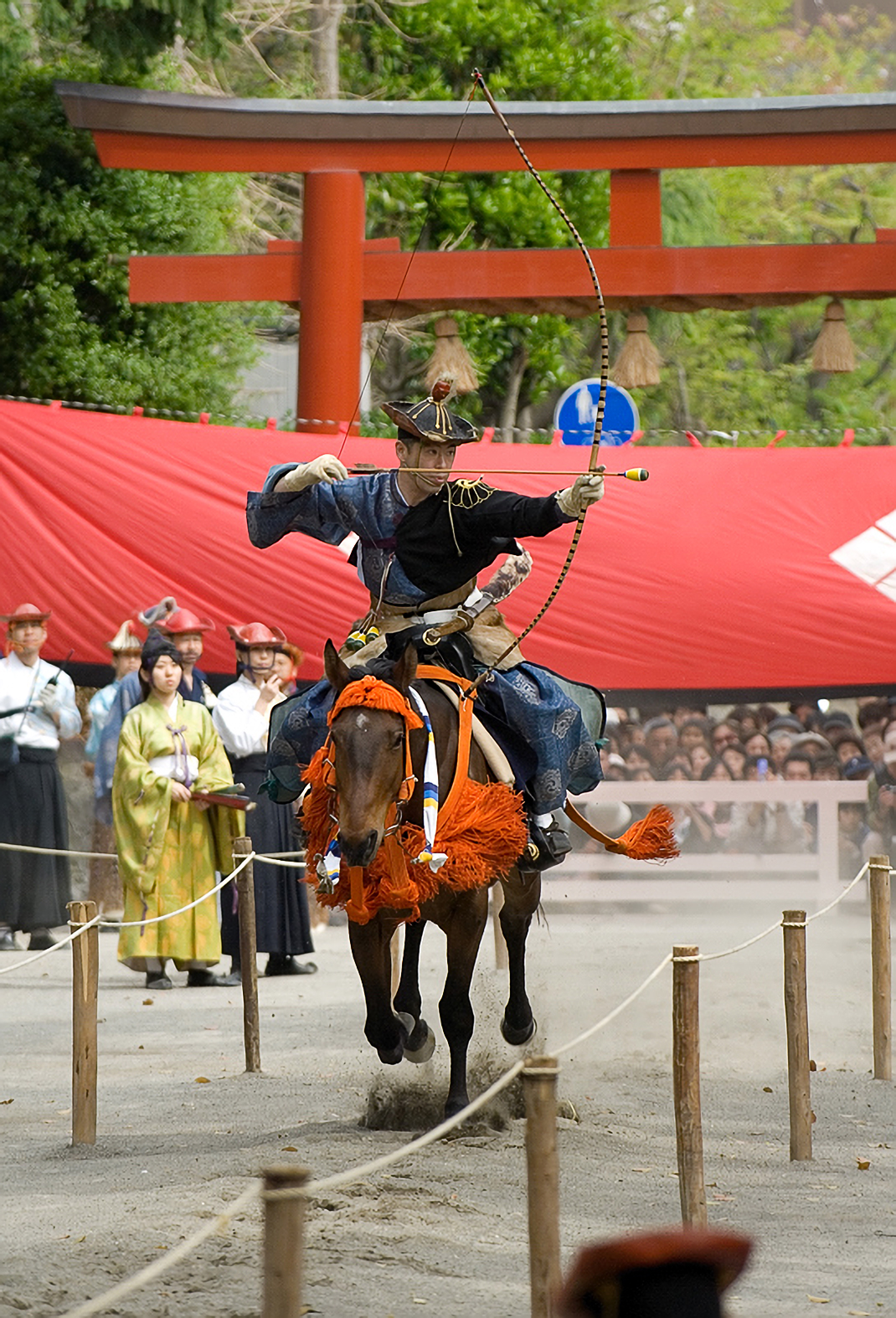
Yabusame archer on horseback.

The history of Japanese horse archery dates back to the 4th century. It became popular in Japan, attracting crowds. The emperor found that the crowds were not appropriate to the solemn and sacred nature of the occasion, and banned public displays in 698. Horse archery was a widely used combat technique from the Heian period to the Warring States period. Nasu no Yoichi, a samurai of the Kamakura period is the most famous horse archer in Japan. Three kinds of Japanese horse archery (Kasagake, Yabusame, and Inuoumono (dog shooting)) were defined.

When the arquebus was introduced by the Portuguese to Japan in the 16th century, archery became outdated. To maintain traditional Japanese horse archery, Tokugawa Yoshimune, the shōgun, ordered the Ogasawara clan to found a school. Current Japanese horse archery succeeds to the technique reformed by the Ogasawara clan.

Traditionally, women were barred from performing in yabusame, but in 1963 female archers participated in a yabusame demonstration for the first time.

The Yabusame school of horseback archery has found a following in Australia, with the setting up of the Australian Horse Archery School which today conducts public shows in various parts of the world.

== United States ==
Horse archery is a growing sport in the United States. Through the efforts of organizations such as The Mounted Archery Association of the Americas, there are horse archery clubs around the country. Competitive courses one might find in the U.S. incorporate the Korean, Hungarian and Persian Styles (i.e., the Qabaq). Participants combine archery skills with riding a horse, with care and training of the horse undertaken. Riders run reinless down a 90-meter course while loosing arrows at various target arrangements. MA3 Clubs around the country offer members the opportunity to learn the sport by providing ranges, a ranking system, and competitions.

== United Kingdom ==
The British Horseback Archery Association was established in 2007, and is the governing body of horse archery. The first national competition took place in 2010. Since 2013, members have represented Great Britain in international team competitions. Postal matches are also held with participants from across the UK. Categories for disabled riders and for juniors have also been introduced.

== Hungary ==
Kassai Lajos created a competitive rule system of horse archery in the late 1980s, and started to propagate this new form of the sport, first in Hungary, and from the 1990s in the rest of Europe, the United States, and Canada.

His life and work was dramatized by Géza Kaszás in the film A lovasíjász (The horse archer), which premiered in January 2016.

== Federations ==
- World Horseback Archery Federation (WHAF) - 2004
- International Horseback Archery Alliance (IHAA) - 2013
- World Federation of Equestrian Archery (WFEA) - 1994
- Fédération d'Equitation et d'Attelage Belgique (FFE) - 1972

== See also ==
- Archery
- Cataphract
- Composite bow
- Eurasian nomads
- Horses in East Asian warfare
- Hungarian bow
- Mongol bow
- Nomadic empires
- Parthian shot
- Recurve bow
- Sagittarii
- Turkish bow
- Yabusame
- Jinba ittai
