= Siege of Saint-Jean-d'Angély (1351) =

Siege during the Hundred Years' War

- Part of the Hundred Years' War
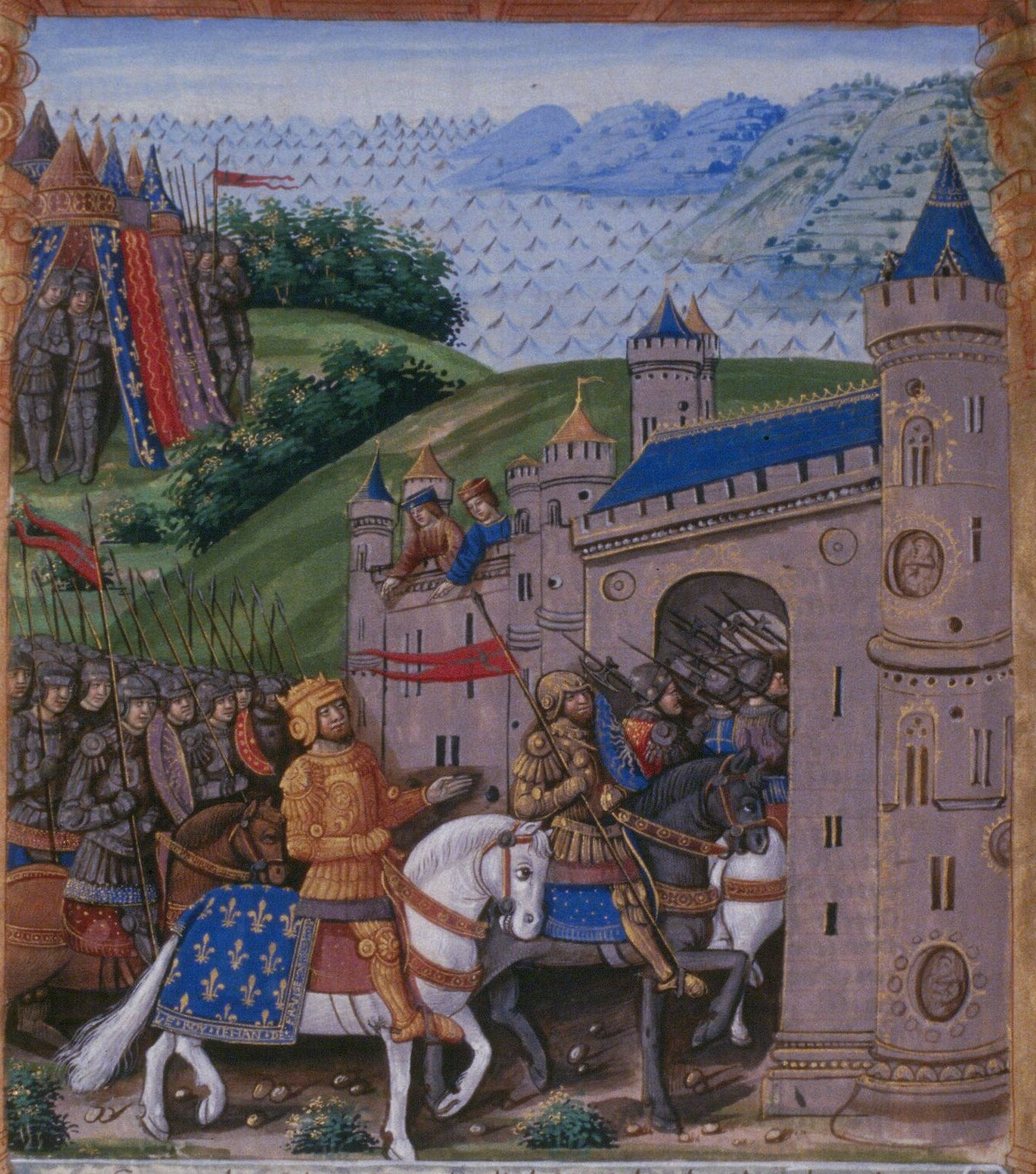
- King John II of France enters Saint-Jean-d'Angély
Date	February – August 1351
Location	Saint-Jean-d'Angély, France 45.9466°N 0.5294°W
Result	French victory

Belligerents
Kingdom of England	Kingdom of France

Commanders and leaders
Raymond-Guilhem de Caupenne	Guy II de Nesle; Édouard I de Beaujeu
- Location within Nouvelle-Aquitaine

The siege of Saint-Jean-d'Angély took place from February to August 1351 when a French army besieged an English garrison within the town of Saint-Jean-d'Angély, Saintonge, France during the Hundred Years' War. An English relief force was victorious at the Battle of Saintes, however was unable to relieve the town. With the personal appearance of King John II of France at the siege, the English garrison surrendered.

== Siege ==
John II ordered a siege of Saint-Jean-d'Angély, a town in Saintonge. An army made up of Poitevin, Saintongeais, Tourangeaux and Angevins knights and foot soldiers, was formed and set up camp at the foot of the walls of Saint-Jean-d'Angély. The army was led by Guy II de Nesle, Marshal of France and Édouard I de Beaujeu.

The French did not take any initiative to attack the city because they lacked large enough siege engines to break the walls of Saint-Jean-d'Angély. The town was surrounded and trade routes blocked to starve the English garrison into surrendering. An English relief force led by the Seneschal of Gascony, John de Cheverston and Arnaud-Amanieu, was intercepted by a French detachment of the siege army. Although the English were victorious, Cheverston was unable to break through to Saint-Jean-d'Angély.

Upon the capture of Guy II de Nesle, Marshal of France, John II headed to the siege of Saint-Jean-d'Angély. In August 1351, with the presence of the King of France, the inhabitants opened the gates of Saint-Jean-d'Angély to the French.
