= Manchu bow =

Composite recurve bow historically used in Manchuria

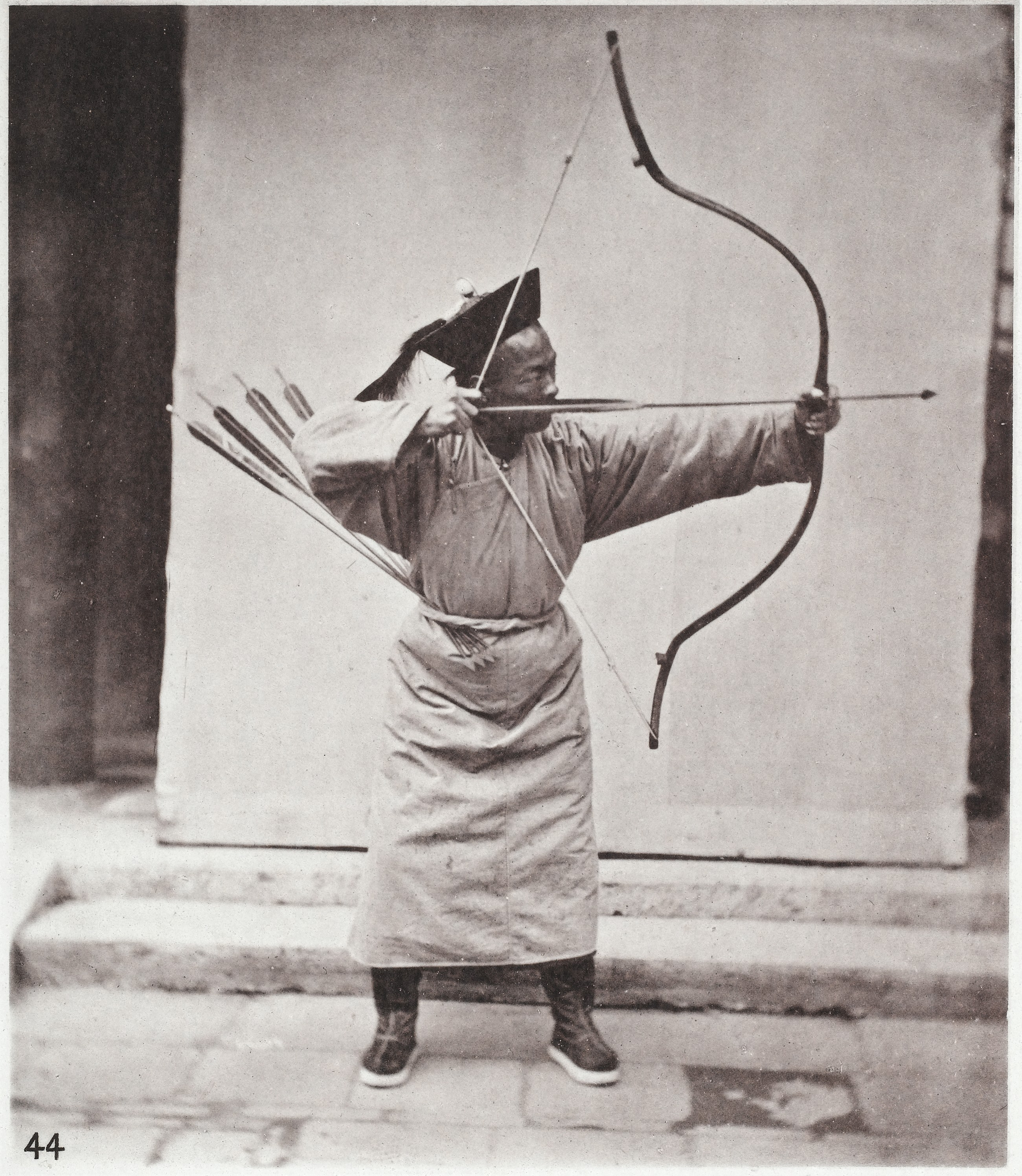
A Manchu bow being drawn in the traditional manner, circa 1874, by John Thomson.

The Manchu bow (Manchu: ᠪᡝᡵᡳ, romanized: beri) is a type of composite reflex bow historically used in Manchuria, and subsequently spread to China, Mongolia, and Tibet during the Qing dynasty. It is similar in construction and likely shares roots with the medieval Mongol bow. It is characterized by very large siyahs, long draw length, prominent string bridges, and use with typically large and heavy arrows. Compared to bows used by other cultures, which fired lighter arrows over longer distances, the Manchu bow was useful for shorter distances and capable of penetrating armor. One observer of the Boxer Rebellion noted that bows of 150 pounds (68 kg) were not uncommon. When strung, the bows were around 196 centimetres (77 in) from tip to tip.

Due to its extensive usage outside Manchuria, this bow is also often identified as a Chinese bow or Mongol bow, and during the 17th century, its widespread usage (along with the increasing proliferation of firearms) almost completely displaced all other types of bows in the Qing Empire. The Manchu military used bows, preferring them over firearms, until the late 19th century.

The Manchu bow was traditionally thumb drawn using a cylindrical thumb ring; standard thumb rings were made of bone.

The early inhabitants of Manchuria likely used other types of bow as well, and may have used a type of mulberry longbow for hunting in wet weather conditions which could negatively affect the glues used for composite bow construction.

== Composition ==
The origin of the Manchu bow design is unknown. It was first recorded in the 17th century but had probably existed for some time, unrecorded, between the fall of the Jin dynasty and the rise of the Later Jin. The first description of something resembling a Manchu bow was in the Wubei yaolue (Essentials of Military Affairs) by Cheng Ziyi (程子頤) in 1638, known as the dashao gong (big ear bow). The bow was used by the Nine Garrisons of the Ming dynasty.

The Manchu bow follows the same basic layout as other Asian composite reflex bows. The bows were formed using frames of either wood, or a mixture of wood and bamboo, to give shape to the bow. Strips of horn were then glued, using a collagen-based, extremely durable glue made from fish bladders, to the compressing side of the working limbs.

The Manchu bow has long, rigid ears to help the archer bend its thicker and wider limbs. There are also distinct string bridges made of either wood, bone, or antler that catch the string once it has been released. This design and the resulting contact causes the draw and release to become a two-stage process: the archer pulls what is effectively a shorter bow that pulls from bridge to bridge as the string leaves the bridges. Once released, the arrow has a second burst of velocity as the string hits the bridges.

Because of its greater weight in the extremities, the Manchu bow does not snap back as quickly as the shorter-eared designs. The long ears are also more susceptible to becoming damaged from twisting and require more maintenance.
