= Édouard I de Beaujeu =

French noble and Marshal of France

- Marshal of France
- Arms of Édouard I de Beaujeu: Or, a lion rampant sable, armed and langued gules, a label of three points gules.
- Born: 11 April 1316
- Died: 8 June 1351 (aged 35); Battle of Ardres, Aquitaine
- Buried: Belleville Abbey, Rhône, France
- Father: Guichard VI de Beaujeu
- Mother: Marie de Châtillon

Édouard I de Beaujeu (11 April 1316 - 8 June 1351) a Marshal of France, Lord of Beaujeu and Montpensier was a 14th-century French noble.

== Life ==
Born on 11 April 1316, he was a son of Guichard VI de Beaujeu and Marie de Châtillon. He succeeded his father as Lord of Beaujeu from 1331. In 1340, he participated in the French campaign in Flanders and distinguished himself at the siege of Mortagne against William II of Hainaut. During 1344 he put himself at the service of the Hugh IV, King of Cyprus and led his troops to Smyrna against the Ottomans. He again distinguished himself at the siege of Angoulême in 1345. He became Lord of Montpensier from 1346. Beaujeu took part in the Battle of Crécy in 1346 and was appointed Marshal of France in 1347. In 1349 he became Captain-General of Picardy and Artois. On 8 June 1351, while leading a French army against the English at the Battle of Ardres, he was killed, however the French were victorious.

He was buried in Belleville Abbey, Rhône.

== Marriage and issue ==
By a marriage contract dated 12 February 1333 he married Marie de Thil (died 4 March 1360), a daughter of Jean I de Thil and Agnes de Frobois. They are known to have had the following issue:

- Antoine de Beaujeu (died 1374), married Béatrice de Chalon, had no issue.
- Marguerite de Beaujeu (died 1402), married Jacques de Savoie.
