= Robert Bemborough =

English knight

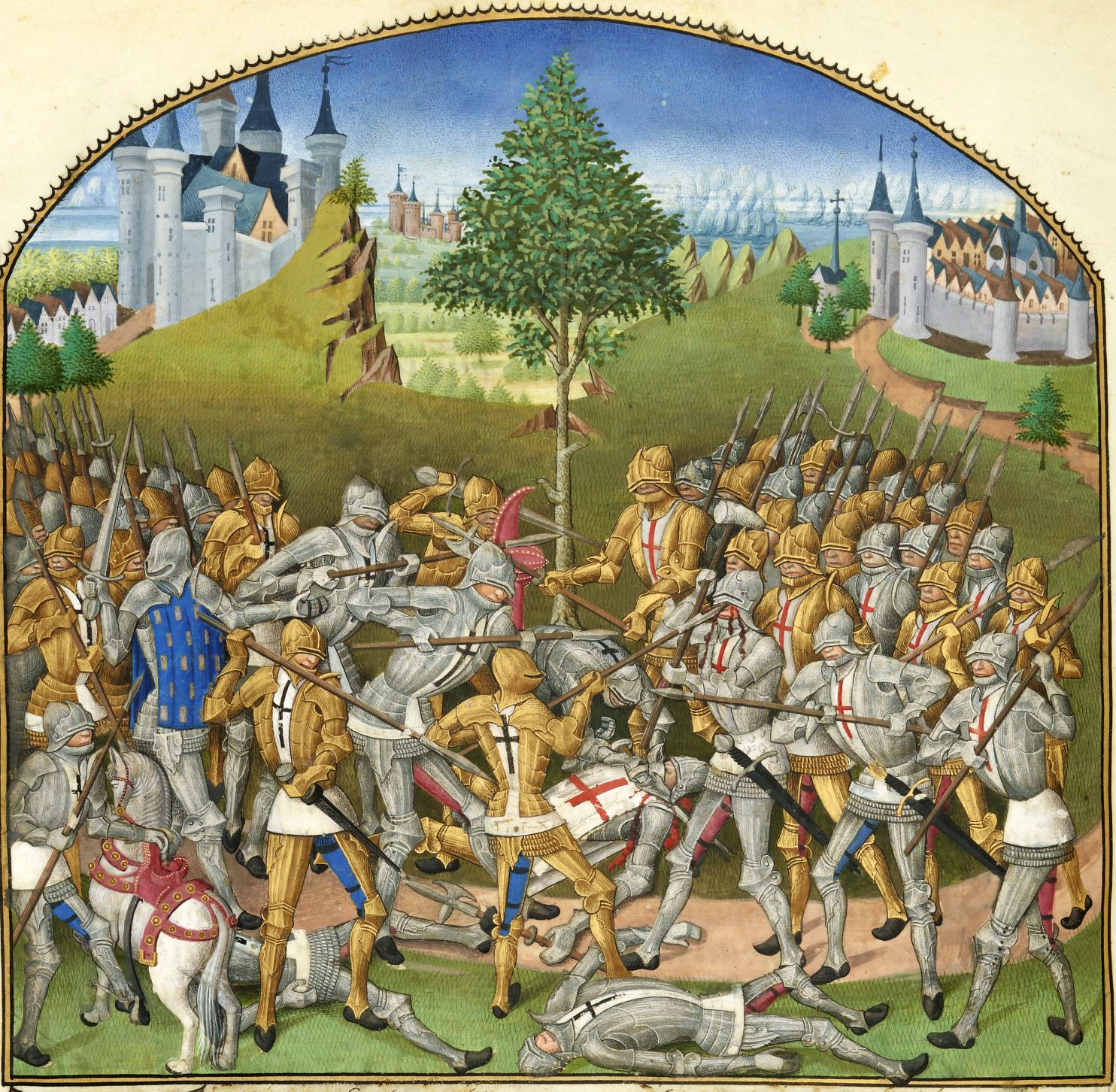
Combat des Trente (Combat of the Thirty): an illumination in the Compillation des cronicques et ystoires des Bretons (1480), of Pierre Le Baud. The two strongholds of Ploërmel and Josselin are fancifully depicted within sight of each other.

Sir Robert Bemborough (d. 1351) was a medieval knight who led the Montfortist faction during the Combat of the Thirty. This was an arranged battle between thirty knights from both sides during the Breton War of Succession, a struggle for control of the duchy between the House of Montfort and the House of Blois. Bemborough was killed in the battle.

The battle was greatly renowned. Bemborough was subsequently depicted by chroniclers as a model of chivalry.

== Background ==
Bemborough led the Montfortist faction which controlled Ploërmel. The Montfortists were supported predominantly by English knights. He was challenged to single combat by Jean de Beaumanoir, the captain of Josselin, the nearest stronghold controlled by the French-supported Blois faction. According to the chronicler Jean Froissart, this purely personal duel between the two leaders became a larger struggle when Bemborough suggested a combat between twenty or thirty knights on each side, a proposal that was enthusiastically accepted by de Beaumanoir. They agreed to an arranged fight at a field marked by an oak tree midway between the two fortresses. Bemborough is supposed to have said,

And let us right there try ourselves and do so much that people will speak of it in future times in halls, in palaces, in public places and elsewhere throughout the world.

The words are recorded by Froissart: "the saying may not be authentic", Johan Huizinga remarks, "but it teaches us what Froissart thought".

== Identity ==
It is unclear whether Bemborough was English or German. His identity is something of a mystery and his name is spelled in many variant forms. It is given as "Brandebourch" by Froissart, and also appears as "Bembro" and "Brembo". His first name is sometimes given as Robert, sometimes as Richard. The chroniclers Jean Le Bel and Froissart say he was a German knight, but historians have doubted this. The 19th-century writer Harrison Ainsworth, taking his cue from the Breton language version of the name, "Pennbrock", concluded that his actual name was the English "Pembroke". In Breton "Penn-brock", sounds like the phrase "badger-head", which became a derogatory nickname for him.

Henry Raymond Brush also argued that he was probably English. The Dictionary of National Biography noted the possibility that he was Sir Richard Greenacre of Merley, and he may have derived the name by which he is known from Bromborough in Cheshire. The name Bembro appears in chronicles of the war associated with English knights, suggesting that a family of the name served in Brittany. Brush also takes the view that he was probably from Bromborough, as a family using that name appears in local records for the period.

== Death ==
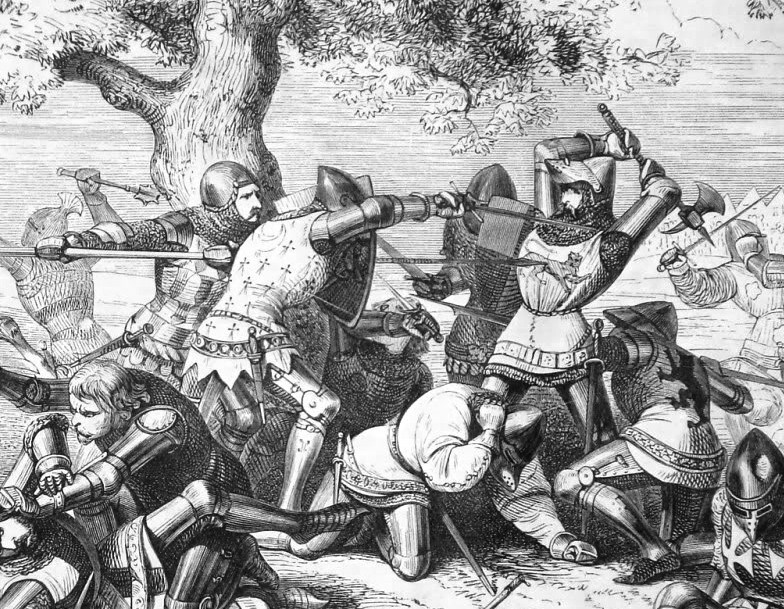
The death of Bemborough. 19th-century illustration

At the battle itself Bemborough was killed. After several hours of fighting there were four dead on the French side and two on the English side. Both sides were exhausted and agreed to a break for refreshments and bandaging of injuries. After the battle resumed, Bemborough was wounded and then killed. Leadership was taken by a German warrior called Croquart, but the Anglo-Breton faction was defeated.

The 19th-century Breton historian Arthur de La Borderie gives a highly dramatic account of Bemborough's death, derived from earlier narratives. In this version he died at the hands of a squire, Alain de Keranrais, and Beaumanoir's loyal friend Geoffroy du Bois, who are defending Beaumanoir from the arrogant "Bembro", who has just vowed to capture him:

At the same time, indignant at Bembro's taunts, a Breton squire, Alain de Keranrais, shouted: "How vile glutton, you imagine you can capture a man like Beaumanoir! Well, I challenge you in his name, you'll soon feel the tip of my spear". He thrust at the same time a blow to the face; the spear penetrates under the skull, Bembro falls heavily. While his companions belabour de Keranrais, the English leader makes a desperate effort to rise and seek his opponent; he finds before him Geoffroy du Bois, who in turn launches his axe into his chest. Bembro falls dead. Du Bois triumphantly exclaims: "Beaumanoir, my dear cousin whom God preserves! Where are you? Art thou Avenged!".

== Cultural image ==
Froissart portrays both Bemborough and his opponent Beaumanoir as ideal representatives of chivalry, who fight for honour and glory rather than personal gain. However, a popular ballad of the period, La Bataille de Trente Anglois et de Trente Bretons, depicts Bemborough as the leader of a band of foreign brigands despoiling the local population, and Beaumanoir as a heroic defender of the people. This version passed into Breton popular culture. It later became the French nationalist version of the Combat, with Bemborough as chief villain. Pierre Le Baud standardised this version in his History of the Bretons (1480), in which Bemborough (called 'Richard Bambro') is portrayed as a soldier animated by a vicious desire to avenge the death of English leader Thomas Dagworth. It reaches its apogee in de La Borderie's Histoire de Bretagne, according to which his control of Ploërmel is distinguished by "rapacity and cruelty" and a "brutality, a ferocity all his own". His virtuous opponent de Beaumanoir challenges him after receiving desperate victims of his brutality into Josselin. The arrogant Bemborough taunts him, but gets his just deserts at the hands of Beaumanoir's men at the Combat.

An alternative point of view is portrayed in Arthur Conan Doyle's historical novel Sir Nigel, in which Bemborough (called Richard of Bambro in the novel) is a hardy knight who accepts the combat as an honourable means to continue the fight after a truce has been declared. Conan Doyle's Bambro is an "old soldier", described as a "rugged Northumbrian" (his name being a reference to Bamburgh) schooled in the tough Anglo-Scots border wars: "a dry, hard, wizened man, small and fierce, with beady black eyes and quick furtive ways." Doyle says that he was "hated in the country where he raised money for the Montfort cause by putting every parish to ransom and maltreating those who refused to pay", but that he approached the battle in a purely chivalrous spirit. He and Beaumanoir heartily shook hands before the battle. He was killed after failing to close his visor properly, allowing Alain de Keranrais to thrust his spear through the gap; he was then finished off by Du Bois.
