= Sir Nigel =

Novel by Arthur Conan Doyle

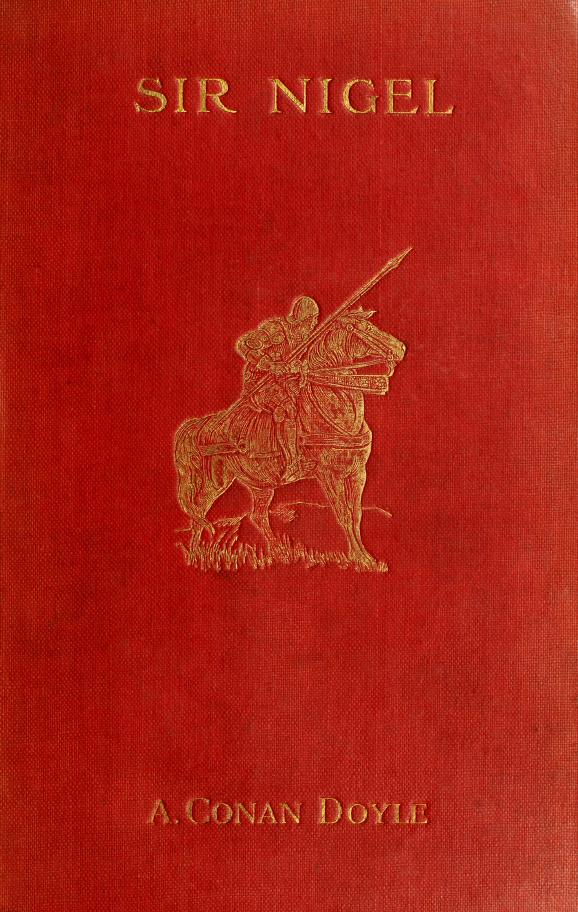
- First UK edition
- Author: Arthur Conan Doyle
- Illustrator: Arthur Twidle, Joseph Clement Coll, The Kinneys
- Language: English
- Genre: Historical novel
- Publisher: The Strand Magazine and Boston Sunday Post (in serial); Smith, Elder & Co. (UK, book); McClure, Phillips (US, book)
- Publication date: 1905–1906 (in serial) & January 1906 (book form)
- Publication place: United Kingdom
- Media type: Print (hardback & paperback)
- Followed by: The White Company

Sir Nigel is a historical novel set during the early phase of the Hundred Years' War, spanning the years 1350 to 1356. It was written by British author Sir Arthur Conan Doyle, first published in serial form during 1905–06 where it was illustrated by Joseph Clement Coll. It was illustrated by The Kinneys and Arthur Twidle in its book editions. It is the background story to Doyle's earlier novel The White Company (1891), and describes the early life of that book's hero, Nigel Loring, a knight in the service of King Edward III in the first phase of the Hundred Years' War. The character is loosely based on the historical knight Neil Loring.

== Plot ==
The tale traces the fortunes of the family of Loring of the Manor of Tilford in Surrey, many of whose members had been prominent in the service of the Norman and Angevin kings of England, against the backdrop of the Black Death. The tale starts with the problems the family and its last scion, Nigel Loring, face at the hands of the monks of Waverley Abbey, up to the coming of Sir John Chandos.

Playing host to King Edward III of England, Nigel asks to be taken into his service. His request is granted and he is made squire to Sir John Chandos. In order to make himself worthy of the hand of the Lady Mary, daughter of Sir John Buttesthorn, he vows to perform three deeds of honour.

Nigel and his follower Samkin Aylward arrive at Winchelsea, whence they take passage to Calais. En route, he manages to intercept Peter the Red Ferret, a French spy who had stolen certain papers of Sir John Chandos. Since these papers had some bearing upon the English defense of Calais in view of a projected French attack, it was considered necessary in the extreme to recover them. Having defeated the spy in single combat, Nigel is overcome by his wounds, and is forced to lay up in the Castle of Calais.

When the king visits the young squire to praise his courage, he mentions that the spy is to be hanged. This outrages Nigel, who had promised the Red Ferret quarter, and he angers the king by opposing the decision. Although the king is enraged by the squire's impertinence, at the intercession of Sir John Chandos, he yields. Nigel Loring then proceeds to set the Red Ferret free after having received his promise not to violate the truce, and then makes a visit to the Lady Mary, to fulfil his promise to her.

Shortly thereafter, Nigel is sent on an expedition to Brittany under the command of Sir Robert Knolles. In the course of their journey, they encounter a Spanish battle fleet in the Straits of Dover, and in conjunction with the English fleet from Winchelsea, inflict a severe defeat upon the Spaniards. The tale is a rendition of the Battle of Les Espagnols sur Mer (August 1351), as chronicled by Froissart, with a fictional storyline weaved in skilfully with the history. Nigel Loring carries himself well, but achieves nothing of note besides boarding a Spanish carrack to assist Prince Edward, the Black Prince, under the directions of Sir Robert, when the prince and his men were outnumbered by Spaniards.

As the army marches into Brittany, a Frenchman is observed tracking the English column. Nigel is entrusted by Sir Robert Knolles with the task of capturing the Frenchman, a task he executes admirably. But when in the act of conducting him to the English camp, they find that the English army had been attacked and some of its longbowmen, among them Samkin Aylward, captured by the robber baron of La Brohinière, nicknamed the butcher, for his practice of executing captives who refuse to join his levées. The English troops try to storm the castle of La Brohinière, by a frontal assault, which fails dismally, with the death of the French captive who, being of noble birth, assists the English in destroying this common nemesis.

With the assistance of Black Simon of Norwich, a very prominent character in the series, and man-at-arms in the army, and some of the peasants of the surrounding country who hate La Brohinière for his cruelty and deeds, Nigel penetrates the connecting passage between the main castle and one of its outworks. In the ensuing assault, the castle is taken and La Brohinière killed by his captives. As a token of appreciation of Nigel's planning and execution of a very difficult task, besides communicating the squire's valour to King Edward and Sir John Chandos, Sir Robert Knolles, at Nigel's request instructs his messenger to convey the news of his deed to the Lady Mary.

The English army proceeds to the Castle of Ploermel, then in the hands of the English knight Richard of Bambro', to advance the English arms in Brittany against the French at Josselin. But news of a truce between England and France precedes their arrival and serves to dampen their spirit until a visit by the French seneschal Robert of Beaumanoir, Master of Josselin. The French lord proposes a passage of arms, and since a reason would be necessary to justify such a violation of the truce, to the two kings of England and France, he proceeds to pick a mock-quarrel with Nigel Loring. Beaumanoir observes that "we have none of the highest of Brittany ... neither a Blois, nor a Leon, nor a Rohan, nor a Conan, fights in our ranks this day". Conan was in fact the personal name of several Dukes of Brittany.

In the jousts that thus ensue, the English arms are initially routed with Bambro' killed and Nigel felled, severely wounded. Though the English rally and sorely press the Bretons, by an underhand act, one of the Breton squires mounts his horse, when the conflict was supposed to be on foot, and rides upon the English crushing them.

This incident is a thinly veiled account of the famed Combat of the Thirty of March 1351, which is of importance in Breton history and in the annals of chivalry, as being an exemplary passage of arms. Sir Robert Knolles, who is held to have participated in the fictional jousts in Sir Nigel, was also one of the original thirty combatants.

Subsequent to the joust, where he tries to take on Beaumanoir himself and is severely wounded, Nigel Loring is left to recover at the Castle of Ploermel by his comrades, and proceeds to convalesce in the course of a year, which sees the breaking of the truce, a defeat of French arms in Brittany and the declaration of another truce.

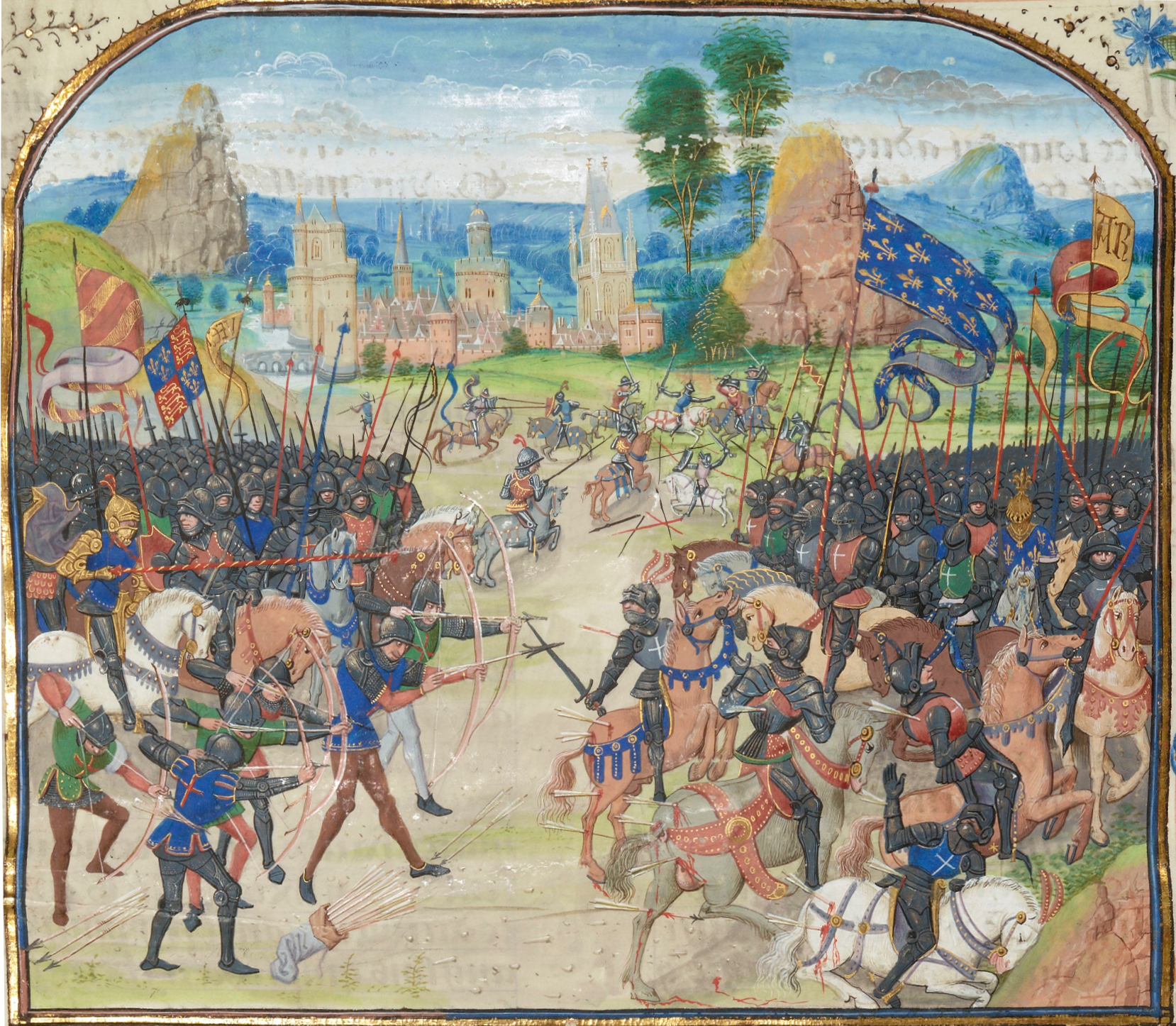
The Battle of Poitiers in the Chronicles of Froissart

Nigel is by then made seneschal of the Castle of Vannes. It is then that Sir John Chandos summons him to Bergerac to accompany the Black Prince on a raid into France. This raid concludes in the Battle of Poitiers (September 1356). In the course of the battle, Nigel overcomes King John II of France but fails to receive his surrender not knowing the identity of his opponent and is thus unable to lay claim to the king's ransom. But since the king himself identifies the squire as his conqueror, the Black Prince awards Nigel Loring his golden spurs and dubs him a knight (the historical Neil Loring is older than the protagonist, and was knighted in 1340 at the Battle of Sluys).

Sir Nigel then returns to England where he weds the Lady Mary. The book concludes with a summary of Sir Nigel's life and the future, which had already been documented in The White Company.
