= Combat of the Thirty =

Part of the Breton War of Succession (1351)

- Part of the Breton War of Succession
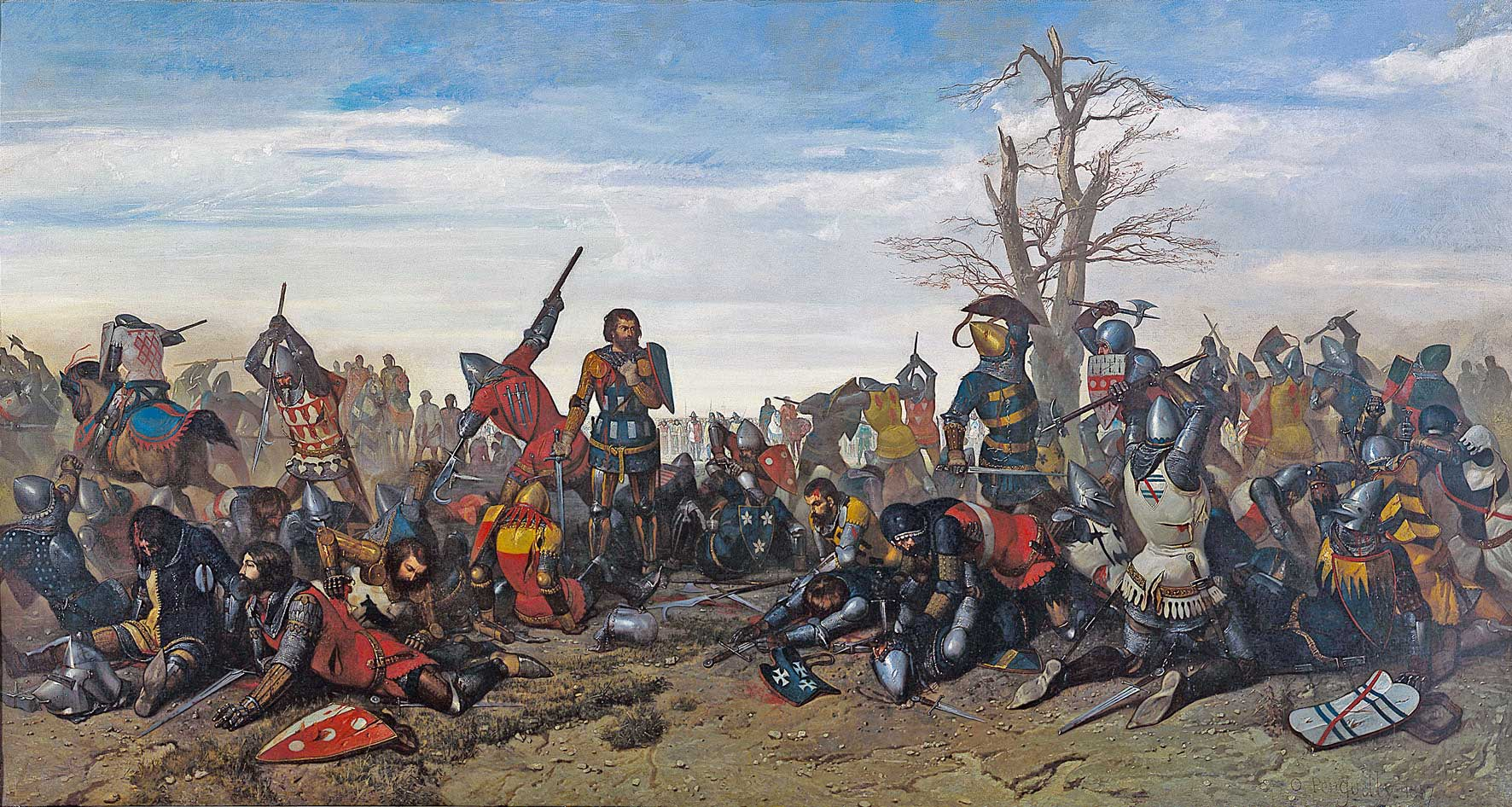
- The Combat of the Thirty by Penguilly l'Haridon, 1857
Date	26 March 1351
Location	Guillac, Duchy of Brittany 47°56′15″N 02°29′13″W
Result	Franco-Breton victory

Belligerents
House of Blois, Brittany; Kingdom of France	House of Montfort, Brittany; Kingdom of England

Commanders and leaders
Jean de Beaumanoir	Robert Bemborough †

Strength
30 knights and squires	30 knights and squires

Casualties and losses
2 dead	9 dead
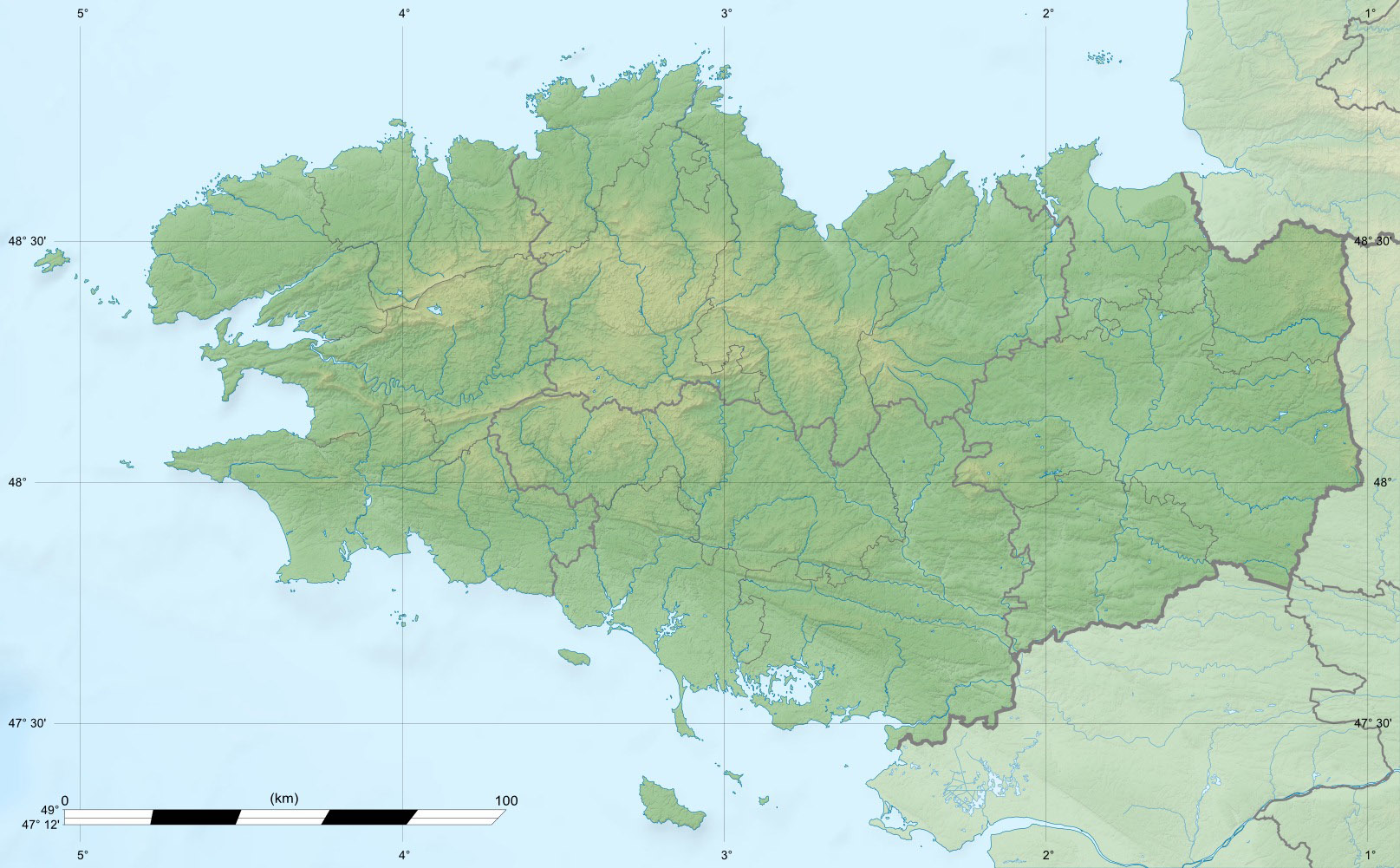
- Location within Brittany

Banner attributed to Breton and French knights at the Combat of the Thirty in 1351, during the Breton civil war

The Combat of the Thirty (French: Combat des Trente, Breton: Emgann an Tregont), occurring on 26 March 1351, was an episode in the Breton War of Succession fought to determine who would rule the Duchy of Brittany. It was an arranged fight between selected combatants from both sides of the conflict, fought at a site midway between the Breton castles of Josselin and Ploërmel among 30 champions, knights, and squires on each side. The challenge was issued by Jean de Beaumanoir, a captain of Charles of Blois supported by King Philip VI of France, to Robert Bemborough, a captain of Jean de Montfort supported by Edward III of England.

After a hard-fought battle, the Franco-Breton Blois faction emerged victorious. The combat was later celebrated by medieval chroniclers and balladeers as a noble display of the ideals of chivalry. In the words of Jean Froissart, the warriors "held themselves as valiantly on both sides as if they had been all Rolands and Olivers".

== Background and cause ==
The Breton War of Succession was a struggle between the House of Montfort and House of Blois for control of the Duchy of Brittany. It came to be absorbed into the larger Hundred Years' War between France and England, with England supporting the Montforts and France supporting the Blois family. At the time of the tournament, the war had become stalemated, with each faction controlling strongholds at different locations within Brittany, but occasionally making sorties into one another's territory.

Robert Bemborough, a knight leading the Montfortist faction which controlled Ploërmel, was challenged to single combat by Jean de Beaumanoir, the captain of nearby Josselin, controlled by the Blois faction. According to the chronicler Froissart, this purely personal duel between the two leaders became a larger struggle when Bemborough suggested a tournament between twenty or thirty knights on each side, a proposal that was enthusiastically accepted by de Beaumanoir.

The motivation for the tournament is unclear. The earliest written sources present it as a purely chivalric exercise, undertaken to honour the ladies for whom the knights were fighting: referring to Joan of Penthièvre (House of Blois) and Joan of Flanders (House of Montfort). These women were leading the two factions at the time, as Joan's husband was in captivity and Joanna's was dead (her son was a young child at the time). This is the account given by the contemporary chroniclers Jean le Bel and Jean Froissart, both of whom present the conflict as purely a matter of honour with no personal animosity involved. Le Bel states that he had his information from one of the combatants. Froissart appears to simply copy le Bel's version.

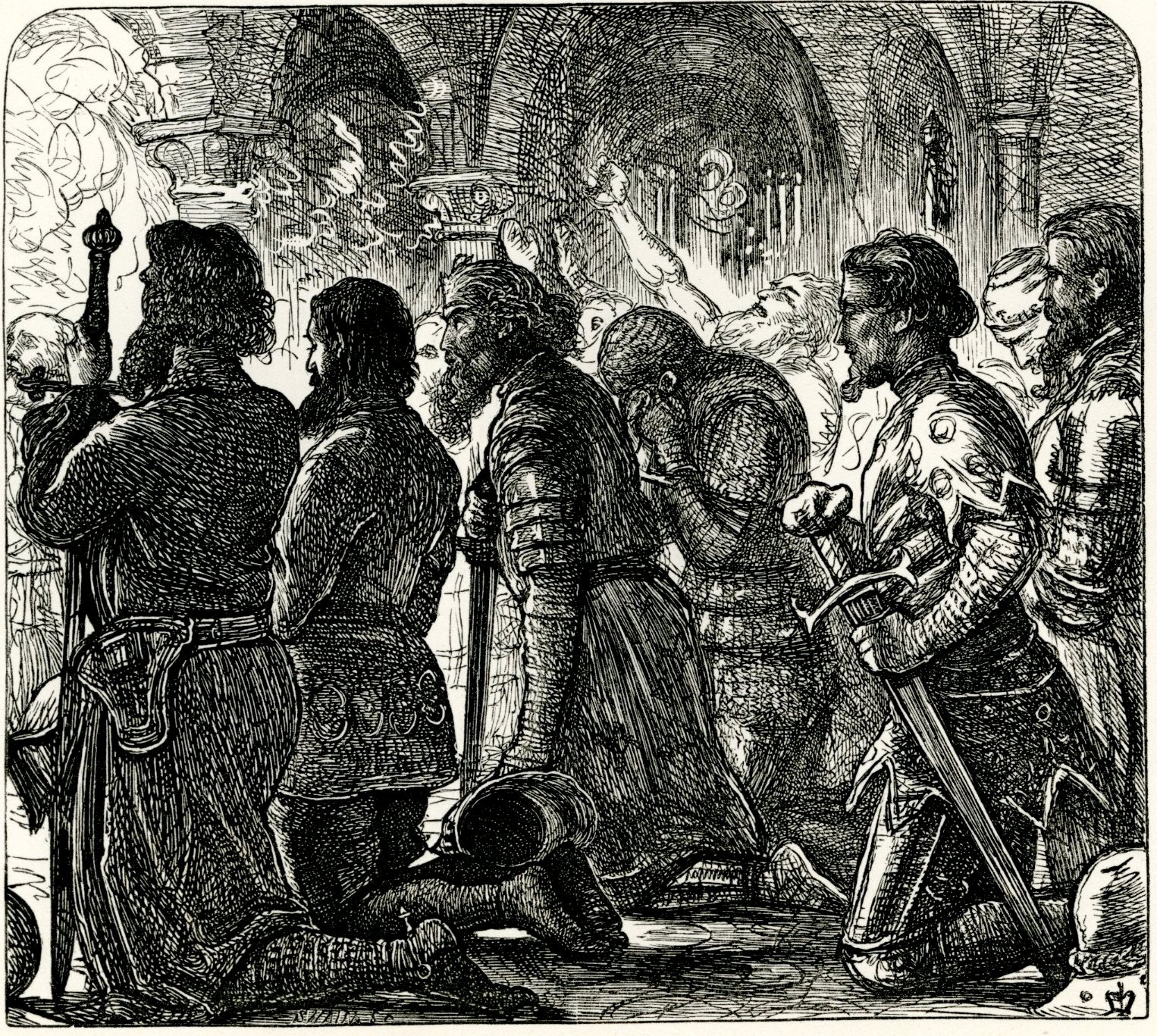
Beaumanoir's knights kneel in prayer before battle. Illustration by J. E. Millais to Tom Taylor's translation of a Breton language ballad in Barzaz Breiz

However, popular ballads portrayed the cause differently. The earliest of these, written by an unknown local supporter of the Blois faction, depicts Bemborough and his knights as ruthless despoilers of the local population, who appealed to Beaumanoir for help. Beaumanoir is depicted as a hero coming to the aid of the defenceless people. The poet also portrays Beaumanoir as a model of Christian piety, who puts his faith in God, in contrast to Bemborough who relies on the Prophesies of Merlin. This version was standardised in Pierre Le Baud's History of the Bretons, written a century later, in which Bemborough's alleged cruelty is explained by his desire to avenge the death of Thomas Dagworth.

Whatever the cause, the fight was arranged in the form of an emprise—an arranged pas d'armes—which took place at an area known as the chêne de Mi-Voie (the Halfway Oak) between Ploërmel and Josselin, between picked combatants. It was organised in the manner of a tournament, with refreshments on hand and a large gathering of spectators. Bemborough is supposed to have said,

And let us right there try ourselves and do so much that people will speak of it in future times in halls, in palaces, in public places and elsewhere throughout the world.

The words are recorded by Froissart: "the saying may not be authentic", Johan Huizinga remarks, "but it teaches us what Froissart thought".

Beaumanoir commanded thirty Bretons, Bemborough a mixed force of twenty Englishmen (including Robert Knolles and Hugh Calveley), six German mercenaries and four Breton partisans of Montfort. It is unclear whether Bemborough himself was English or German. His name is spelled in many variant forms, and is given as "Brandebourch" by Froissart, and also appears as "Bembro". His first name is sometimes given as Robert, sometimes as Richard. Both Le Bel and Froissart say he was a German knight, but historians have doubted this. All the Blois-faction knights can be identified, though Jean de Beaumanoir's given name is "Robert" in some versions. The names and identities of the Montfortists are much more confused and uncertain.

== Battle ==
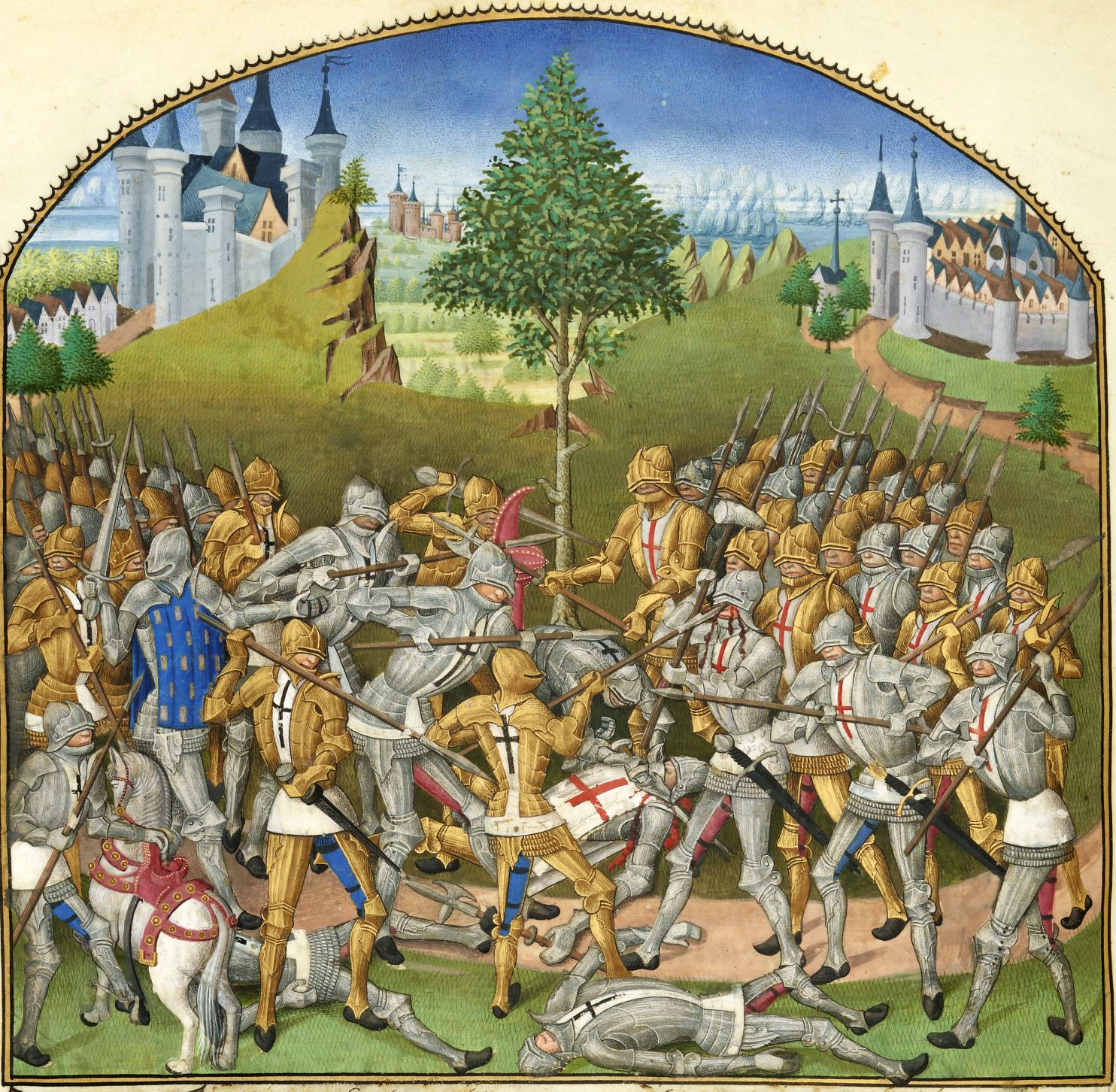
Combat des Trente: an illumination in the Compillation des cronicques et ystoires des Bretons (1480), of Pierre Le Baud. The two strongholds of Ploërmel and Josselin are fancifully depicted within sight of each other.

The battle, fought with swords, daggers, spears, and axes, mounted or on foot, was of the most desperate character, in its details very reminiscent of the last fight of the Burgundians in the Nibelungenlied, especially in the celebrated advice of Geoffroy du Bois to his wounded leader, who was asking for water: "Drink thy blood, Beaumanoir; thy thirst will pass" (Bois ton sang, Beaumanoir, la soif te passera).

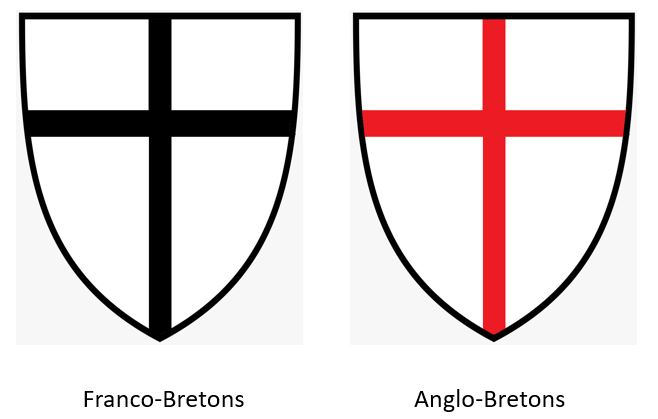
According to P.Rault show the Franco-Bretons knights wearing tunics with a black cross while the Anglo-Bretons knights wearing tunics with a red cross.

According to Froissart, the battle was fought with great gallantry on both sides. After several hours of fighting there were four dead on the French side and two on the English side. Both sides were exhausted and agreed to a break for refreshments and bandaging of injuries. After the battle resumed, the English leader Bemborough was wounded and then killed, apparently by du Bois. At this point the English faction formed a tight defensive body, which the French repeatedly attacked. A German soldier called Croquart is said to have displayed the greatest prowess in rallying the Anglo-Breton defence.

In the end, the victory was decided by Guillaume de Montauban, a squire who mounted his horse and rode into the English line, breaking it. He overthrew seven of the English champions, the rest being forced to surrender. All the combatants on either side were either dead or seriously wounded, with nine on the English side slain.

== Reputation ==
While the combat did not have any effect on the outcome of the Breton War of Succession, it was considered by contemporaries to be an example of the finest chivalry. It was sung by trouvères, retold in the chronicles of Froissart and largely admired, and honoured in verse and the visual arts. A commemorative stone was placed at the site of the combat situated between Josselin and Ploermel and King Charles V of France commissioned a tapestry depicting it. The renown attached to those who participated was such that twenty years later, Jean Froissart noticed a scarred survivor, Yves Charruel, at the table of Charles V, where he was honoured above all others due to having been one of the Thirty.

According to historian Steven Muhlberger, this chivalric version concentrates on "how the deed was done and not on who won. The willingness of all concerned to agree to rules and to actually observe them, to fight their best and not to run when injured or in danger of capture are the focus – and both sides are shown as equally worthy in that respect."

Later, the combat came to be seen in very different terms, influenced by the most famous of the contemporary popular ballads on the topic. In this version the English knights are villains, and the Blois faction are loyal and worthy local warriors. The balladeer lists each fighter on both sides (though garbles several English names). He situates the Franco-Breton Blois faction as all local gentry and aristocracy performing their proper social duty to protect the people, thus justifying, Muhlberger writes, "the privileges that nobles held as brave defenders of the weak". The Montfortists are a mélange of foreign mercenaries and brigands who "torment the poor people". After Brittany was absorbed into France, this version was incorporated into French nationalist accounts of the Hundred Years War, which was portrayed as a heroic struggle against foreign invaders who sought to violate France. Since the French faction had lost the War of Succession itself, the Combat was promoted as a symbolic and moral victory. A large monumental obelisk was commissioned by Napoleon in 1811 to be placed at the site of the battle, but it was not built during his reign. It was eventually erected in 1819 by the restored Bourbon king Louis XVIII, after the fall of Napoleon, with an inscription stating "God give the King long life, the Bourbons eternity!" The inscription goes on to assert that the "thirty Bretons whose names are given as follows, fought to defend the poor, labourers and craftsmen and they vanquished foreigners attracted on the soil of the Country by fateful dissents. Breton posterity, imitate your ancestors!"

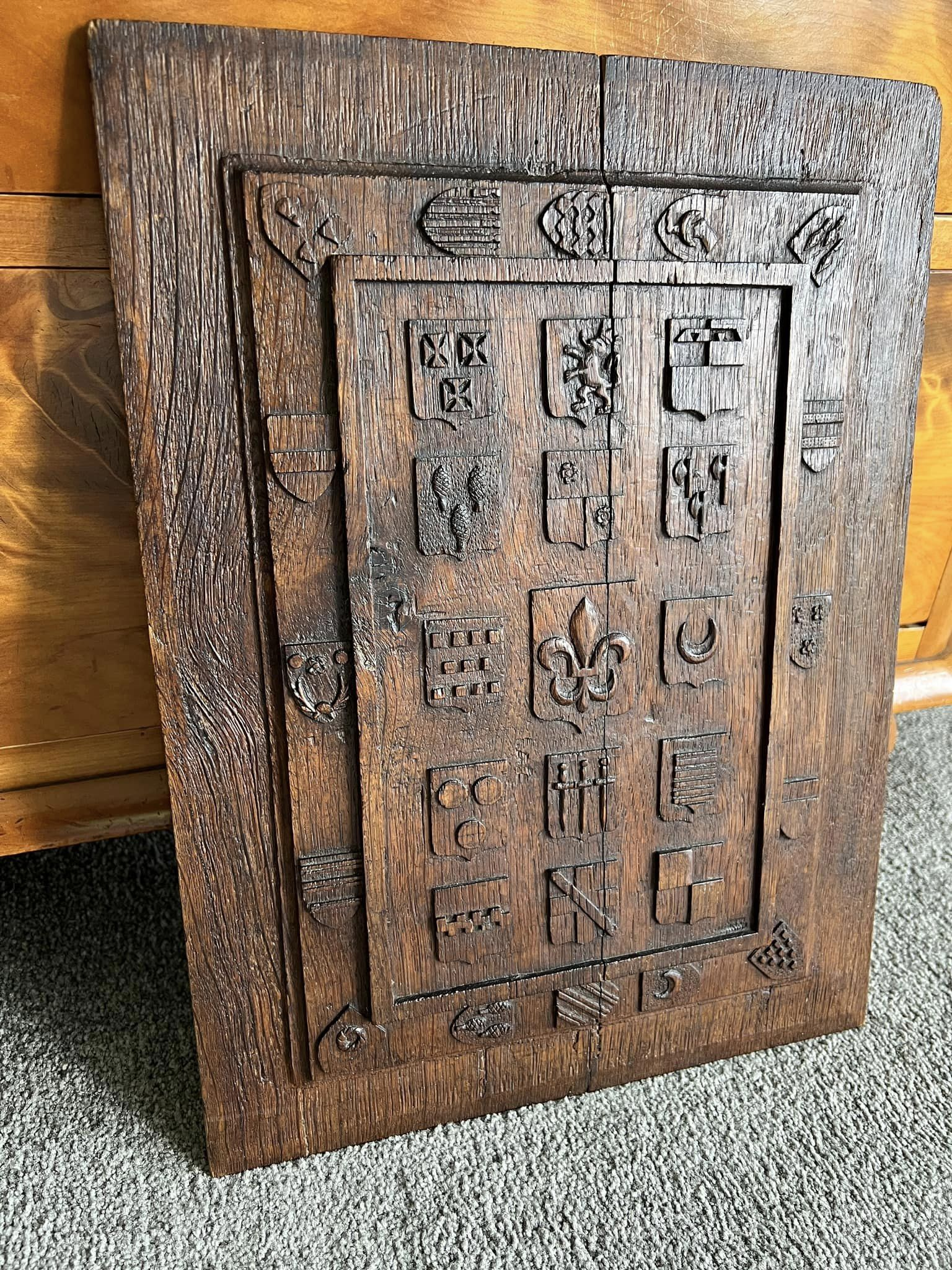
16th century panel showing the arms of the French knights who fought in the Combat of the Thirty in 1351

Though the combat had much less significance for the English, the fact that it was won because one combatant mounted a horse to break the Anglo-Breton line was later portrayed as evidence that the Franco-Bretons cheated. Edward Smedley's History of France (1836) states that the manoeuvre "wears some appearance of treachery". This version was fictionalised by Arthur Conan Doyle in his historical novel Sir Nigel, in which Bemborough (called Richard of Bambro' in the novel) accepts the rules of the challenge in a chivalric spirit, but the Franco-Bretons win only because Montauban, portrayed as Beaumanoir's squire, mounts his horse, when the conflict was supposed to be on foot, and rides upon the English, trampling them.

A free English translation in verse of the ballad was written by Harrison Ainsworth, who gives the name of the English leader as "Sir Robert Pembroke". He is fancifully portrayed as the overall English leader after the death of Thomas Dagworth. Ainsworth argued that "Bembro" was originally "Pembroke" on the grounds that the Breton language version of the name was "Pennbrock". "Penn brock" means "badger head" in Breton, which had become a derogatory nickname for Bemborough in Breton ballads.

== Combatants ==
These are the names of the knights, as listed in Ainsworth's translation of the poem, although there are actually 31 listed for the English side.

Franco-Breton force Knights: Sir Jean de Beaumanoir, Constable of Brittany, Governor of Josselin; Sir Olivier Arrel; Sir Caron de Bosdegas; Sir Geoffroy du Bois; Sir Yves Charruel; Sir Guy de Rochefort; Sir Jean Rouxelot; Sir Robin Raguenel; Sir Huon de Saint-Hugeon; Sir Jean de Tinténiac; Squires: Geoffroy de Beaucorps; Hughes Capus-le-Sage; Olivier de Fontenay; Louis de Goyon; Alain de Keranrais; Guillaume de la Lande; Guillaume de la Marche; Geoffroy de Mellon †; Guillaume de Montauban; Olivier de Monteville; Maurice du Parc; Tristan de Pestivien; Guyon de Pontblanc; Geoffroy Poulard †; Simonet Pachard; Geoffroy de la Roche; Jean de Serent; Alain de Tinténiac; Maurice de Tréziguify; Geslin de Trésiguidy	Anglo-Breton force Knights: Sir Robert Bemborough, Captain of Ploërmel †; Sir Robert Knolles; Sir Thomas Billefort; Sir Thomas Walton; Sir Hugh Calveley; Sir Hervé Laxaualan; Sir Richard Lalande; Squires and men-at-arms: John Plesington; Richard Gaillard; Hughes Gaillard; Huceton Clemenbean; Hennequin de Guenchamp; Renequin Hérouart; Hennequin Le Mareschal; Raoulet d'Aspremont; Gaultier l'Alemant; Bobinet Melipart; Jean Troussel; Robin Adès; Perrot Gannelon; Guillemin-le-Gaillard; Jennequin Taillard; Rango-le-Couart; Raoul Prévot; Dardaine †; Repefort; Croquart the German; Isannay; Dagworth (nephew of Sir Thomas Dagworth); Helichon; Helecoq

† indicates that the combatant was killed. The English side lost nine killed in total and the remainder captured. The Franco-Breton side lost at least three and probably more. A number of them were captured, taken to Josselin and executed.

== See also ==
- Battle of the North Inch, similar battle in Scotland, 1396

== Literature ==
- "The combat of the thirty. From an old Breton lay of the fourteenth century". Translated by English novelist William Harrison Ainsworth. In: Browne, H. Knight; Cruikshank, G.; Smith, A.; Ainsworth, W. Harrison; Dickens, C. (18371868) (1859). Bentley's Miscellany Volume XLV. London: Richard Bentley. pp. 5–10, 445–459.
- H.R. Brush, ed., "La Bataille de trente Anglois et de trente Bretons," Modern Philology, 9 (1911–12): 511–44; 10 (1912–13): 82–136.
- Sir Arthur Conan Doyle, Sir Nigel.
- Steven Muhlberger (tr. and ed.), The Combat of the Thirty, Deeds of Arms Series, vol. 2 (Wheaton, IL: Freelance Academy Press, 2012).
- Steven Muhlberger, Deeds of Arms: Formal combats in the late fourteenth century, (Highland Village, TX: The Chivalry Bookshelf, 2005) 76–120.
- Chisholm, Hugh, ed. (1911). "Beaumanoir" . Encyclopædia Britannica (11th ed.). Cambridge University Press.
- Sébastien Nadot, Rompez les lances ! Chevaliers et tournois au Moyen Age, Paris, ed. Autrement, 2010. (Couch your lances ! Knights and tournaments in the Middle Ages...)
- Le Poème du combat des Trente, in the Panthéon litteraire
- A Distant Mirror by Barbara W. Tuchman (1978)
