= Jean de Beaumanoir =

French knight (born 1310)

- Breton Knight
- Blason of Jean de Beaumanoir
- Born: 1310
- Died: 1366/1367
- Spouses: Tiphaine de Chemillé, Marguerite de Rohan

Jean, or Jehan de Beaumanoir, marshal of Brittany for Charles of Blois, and captain of Josselin, is remembered for his share in the famous Combat of the Thirty during the War of Breton Succession (1341–1364) between the warring parties of competing claimants for the Dukedom.

== Origin ==
Jean IV de Beaumanoir was the son of Jean III de Beaumanoir, Lord of Beaumanoir and Merdrignac and Marie de Dinan-Montafilant, known as “Marie du Guildo”, and the nephew of Robert. Jean IV succeeded his father as Lord of Merdrignac. He was also a friend and a comrade in arms of Bertrand du Guesclin, a fellow Breton Knight and Constable of France.

== Marriage and issue ==
=== First marriage ===
Jean first married Tiphaine de Chemillé, who gave him two sons; both died childless:

- Jean V de Beaumanoir (died in 1385) buried in the abbey of Saint-Magloire de Léhon, married to Tiphaine du Guesclin, lady of Plessis-Bertrand, without posterity.
- Robert (died in 1407), Lord of Beaumanoir after his brother, buried in Saint-Magloire Abbey in Léhon, without alliance or posterity.

=== Second marriage ===
Jean then married Marguerite de Rohan, daughter of Alain VII of Rohan and widow of Olivier V de Clisson. They had three daughters who married into the most prominent breton families of the time:

- Jeanne who became the wife of Charles de Dinan, Lord of Montafilant and baron of Châteaubriant,
- Isabeau who married Jean de Tournemine, Lord of La Hunaudaie, and
- Marguerite who married Gallehaut de Rougé, baron of Derval.

== War of Breton Succession ==
During the War of the Succession in Brittany (1341–1365), Jean embraces the cause of Charles de Blois against John de Montfort for the ducal crown of Brittany and is one of the heroes who stands out most at the battle of La Roche-Derrien (1347).

=== Combat of the Thirty ===
Robert Bemborough, the English captain of Ploërmel, who supported the rival claimant John de Montfort, was the nearest enemy leader. In 1351, Beaumanoir sent him a challenge, which resulted in an "emprise" – an arranged chivalric combat – which took place near Ploërmel, between picked combatants.

Beaumanoir commanded thirty Bretons, Bemborough a mixed force of twenty Englishmen (including Sir Robert Knolles and Sir Hugh Calveley), six German mercenaries and four Breton partisans of Montfort. The battle, fought with swords, daggers, spears, and axes, mounted or on foot, was extremely vicious. When de Beaumanoir was badly wounded and asked for water, his fellow combatant Geoffroy du Bois is supposed to have said to him "Drink your blood, Beaumanoir; your thirst will pass" (Bois ton sang, Beaumanoir, la soif te passera). De Beaumanoir's men emerged victorious, and he became an icon of medieval chivalry.

=== Battle of Auray ===
When his faction was eventually defeated at the Battle of Auray in 1364, de Beaumanoir helped to negotiate the Treaty of Guérande, which ended the war, receiving in return the title of Marshal of Brittany.

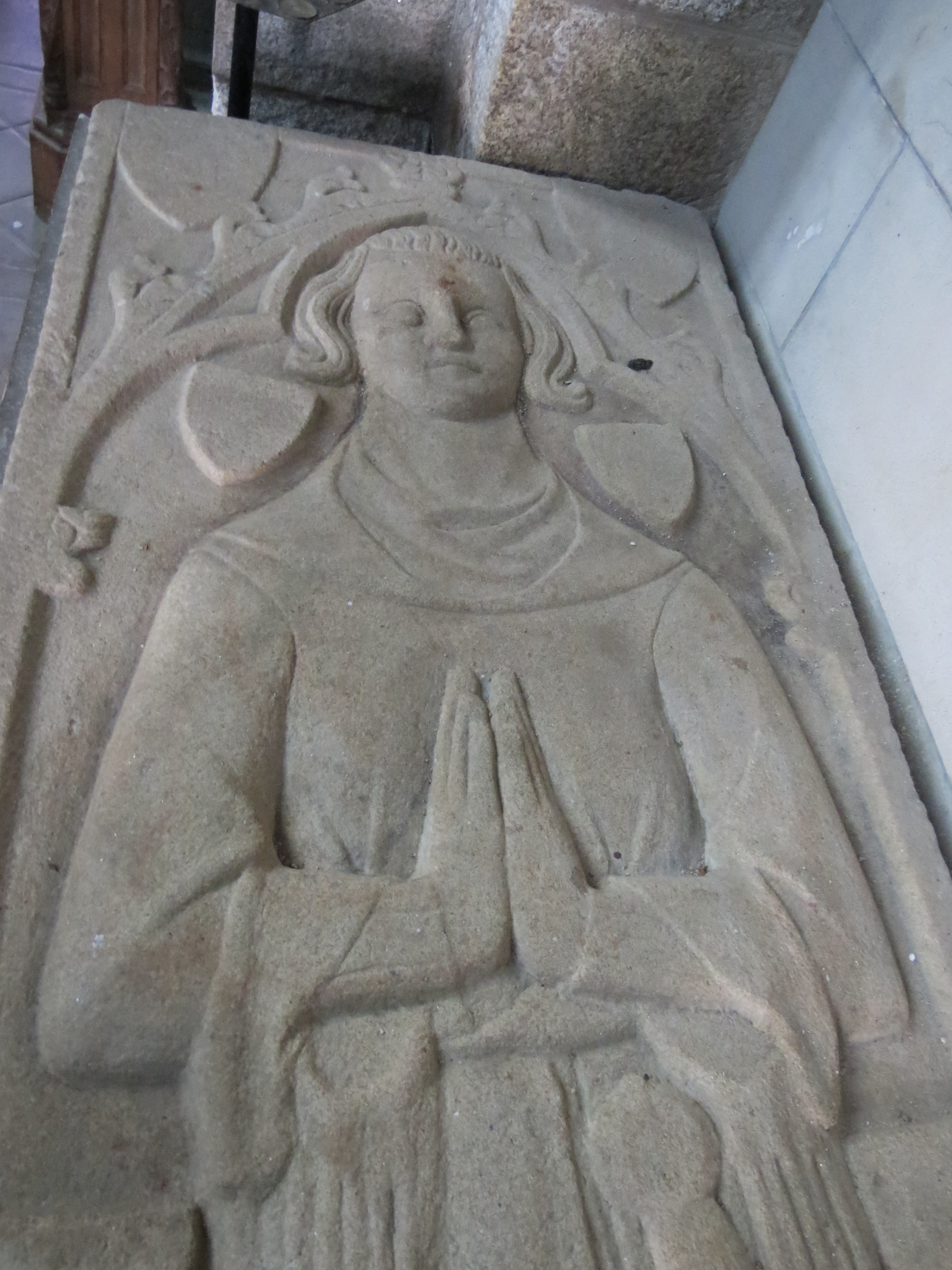
Détail of the tomb of Jean de Beaumanoir at the Abby de Léhon
