= Bertrand d'Argentré =

Breton jurist and historian (1519–1590)

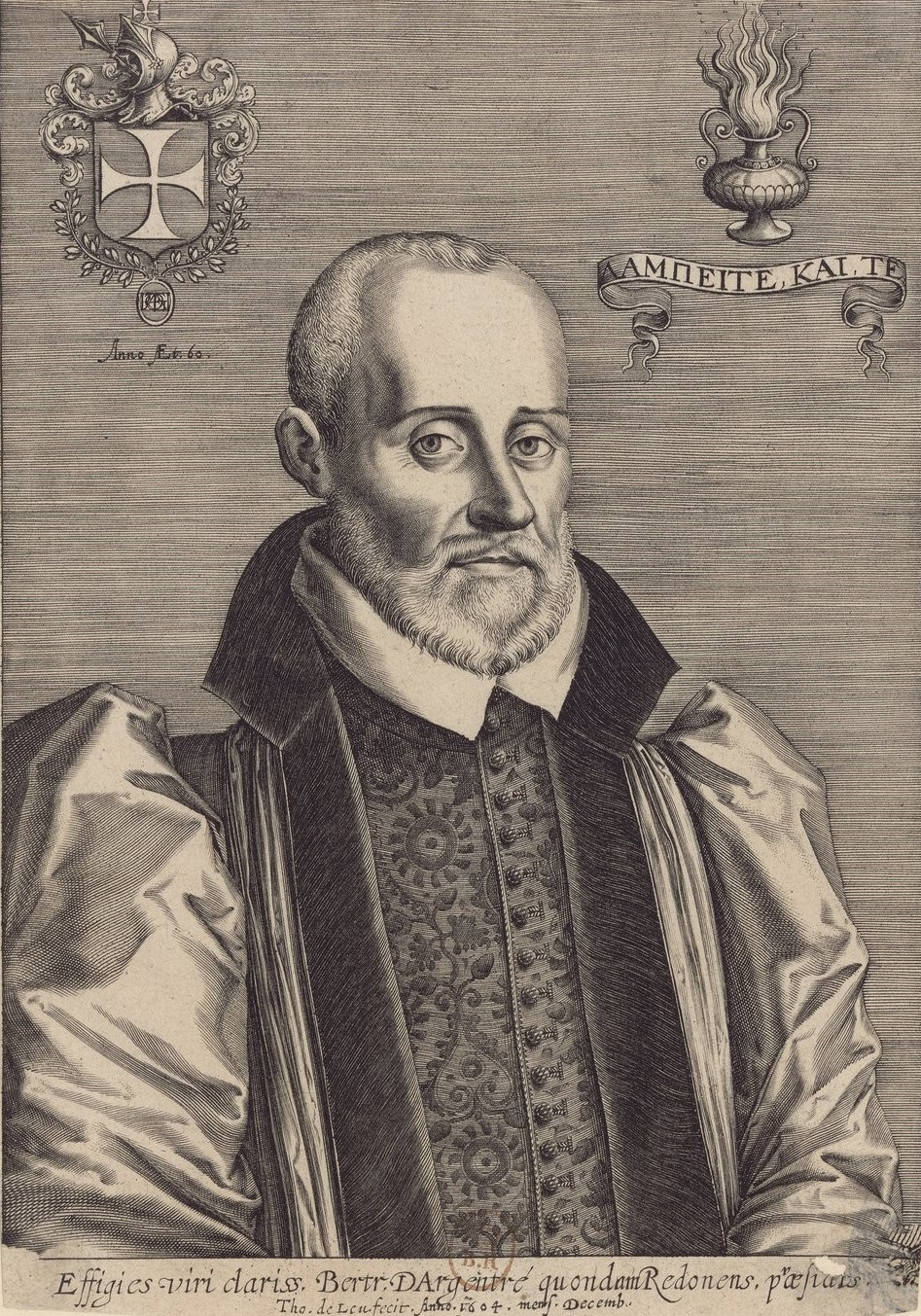
Bertrand d'Argentré.

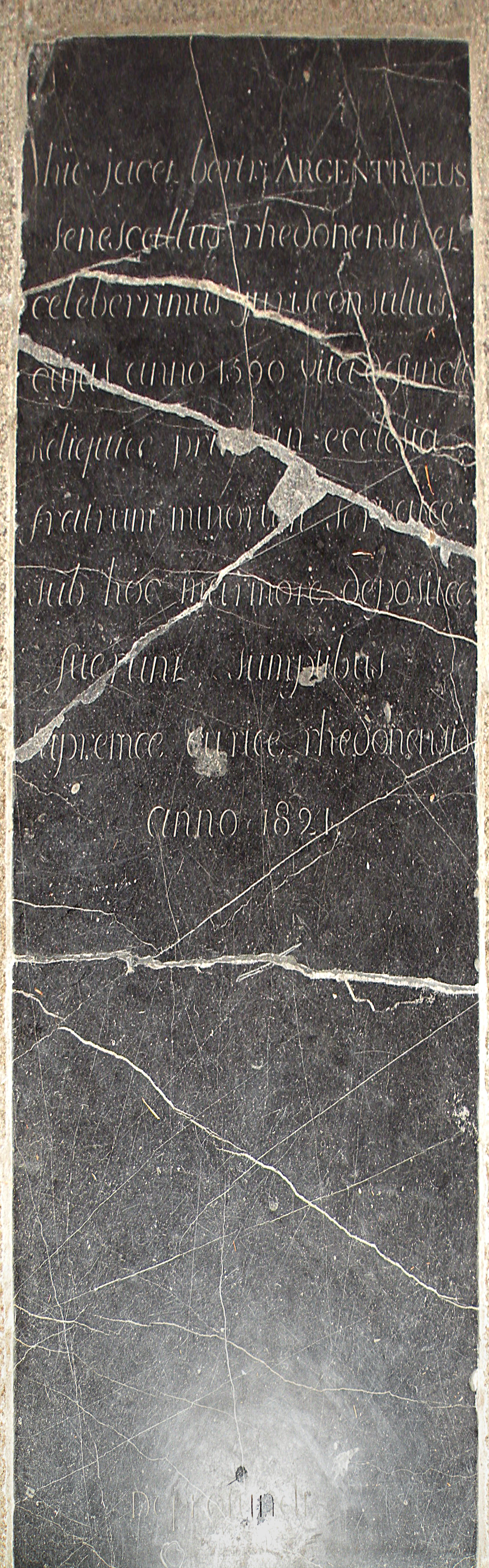
Tomb

Bertrand d'Argentré (or Argentraeus) (19 May 1519 in Vitré, Ille-et-Vilaine – 13 February 1590) was a Breton jurist and historian.

Argentraeus was born the son of Pierre d'Argentré, seneschal of Rennes, and the nephew of historian Pierre Le Baud. After studies of law in Bourges, he was named seneschal of Vitré in 1541 and seneschal of Rennes in 1547. Dismissed from that post, he was named head of the présidial court of Rennes in 1582 instead, but refused to leave Brittany even when offered coveted court positions in Paris.

In his judicial capacity, he frequently clashed with other jurisdictions such as that of the Parlement, which he considered ignorant of Breton customs. His principal legal work is the influential Nouvelle coutume de Bretagne (1580), a compilation of customary Breton law. In that work, D'Argentré fought against the influence of French and Roman law, which he considered overly procedural and inquisitive, unmerciful to the weak, and detrimental to individual liberty.

His work as a historian also emphasised the historical independence of Brittany. The Estates of Brittany commissioned him in 1580 to write a Histoire de Bretagne, which was promptly seized on the order of Henry III for "indignities against King and realm". The book was only allowed to appear in 1588, with extensive censorship of sensitive passages relating to the history of French-Breton relations. However, clandestine reprints of the unedited work remained widely available.

He was also well known for his considerable collection of books that formed one of the largest private libraries of Renaissance France.

In 1589, he supported the insurrection of the Duke of Mercœur, was persecuted by the French authorities and died one year later.

== Works ==
- L'histoire de Bretaigne, des roys, ducs, comtes et princes d'icelle: l'établissement du Royaume, mutation de ce tiltre en Duché, continué jusques au temps de Madame Anne dernière Duchesse, & depuis Royne de France, par le mariage de laquelle passa le Duché en la maison de France. Jacques du Puys, 1588.
- Coustumes générales des pays et duché de Bretagne, Paris, Nicolas Buon, 1608 (rédigé en 1568)
- Advis sur le partage des nobles (1570)
- Commentaires (sur l'Ancienne Coutume de Bretagne), on various topics (1576, 1584)
- Aitiologia (1584), summary of the debates about the reformation of the Breton customary law.
- L'Histoire de Bretaigne, des rois, ducs, comtes, et princes d'icelle, depuis l'an 383 jusques au temps de madame Anne Reyne de France dernière Duchesse. Troisième édition revue et augmentée par messire Charles d'Argentré. Paris, by Nicolas Buon (1618).
