= The White Company =

Historical novel by Arthur Conan Doyle

- First book edition in 3 volumes (UK)
- Author: Arthur Conan Doyle
- Language: English
- Genre: Historical fiction
- Publisher: Smith, Elder & Co. (UK); Thomas Y. Crowell Co. (US)
- Publication date: 1891
- Publication place: United Kingdom
- Media type: Print (Hardback)
- Pages: 483
- Preceded by: Sir Nigel
- Text: The White Company at Wikisource

The White Company is a historical adventure novel by British writer Arthur Conan Doyle, set during the Hundred Years' War. The story is set in England, France and Spain, in the years 1366 and 1367, against the background of the campaign of Edward the Black Prince, to restore Peter of Castile to the throne of the Kingdom of Castile. The climax of the book occurs before the Battle of Nájera. Doyle became inspired to write the novel after attending a lecture on the Middle Ages in 1889. After extensive research, The White Company was published in serialised form in 1891 in The Cornhill Magazine. Additionally, the book is considered a companion to Doyle's 1905–06 Sir Nigel, which explores the early campaigns of Sir Nigel Loring and Samkin Aylward.

The novel is relatively unknown today, though it was very popular up through the Second World War. In fact, Doyle himself regarded this and his other historical novels more highly than the Sherlock Holmes adventures for which he is mainly remembered.

The "White Company" of the title is a free company of archers, led by one of the main characters. The name is taken from a real-life 14th-century Italian mercenary company, led by John Hawkwood.

== Plot ==
At the age of twenty, young Alleyne, son of Edric, leaves Beaulieu Abbey where he has been raised—intelligent, skilled and well liked, though sheltered and naive—and goes out to see the world, in accordance with the terms of his father's will. The same day, the abbot banishes John of Hordle for worldly behaviour: great appetite, teasing and flirting. They meet at the Pied Merlin inn as they each rest for the night. There, they make friends with veteran archer Sam Aylward who has returned to England from France to recruit for the White Company of mercenaries. Aylward has brought a request for Sir Nigel Loring of Christchurch to take command of the company. Aylward and John continue to Christchurch, while Alleyne detours to visit his older brother, the socman or landlord of Minstead, whose fierce reputation has grown to wickedness.

The brothers meet for the first time since Alleyne was an infant and Alleyne finds that his brother is still furious their father gave three hides of land (80–120 acres) to the monastery for the boy's support. The socman threatens a lovely maiden, Maude, who escapes with Alleyne's aid and they flee on foot to find her horse. Maude makes a striking impression on the abbey-raised young man. When she hears that Alleyne intends to rejoin his friends to approach Sir Nigel Loring, Maude laughs and leaves him. Alleyne meets up again with Aylward and Hordle John, and the three friends meet Sir Nigel and his formidable wife Mary. There, he learns that Maude is Sir Nigel's daughter. Alleyne is taken on as squire to Sir Nigel and as tutor to Maude. When the men eventually depart for France, the young couple admit their love, but only to each other. En route to Gascony, our heroes destroy pirates, then report to the court of the Prince of Wales in Bordeaux.

After adventures fearful and funny, the valiant fighters lead the White Company to join the Prince. A letter arrives to Sir Nigel declaring that Alleyne's brother, the Socman of Minstead, had attacked Sir Nigel's castle. During the siege, the socman died. This news means that Alleyne is the new socman and emboldens him to declare his love for Maude to Sir Nigel. Sir Nigel is startled by the news and Alleyne's declaration but indicates that he prefers that Alleyne should be a full knight before he approaches Maude again with talk of love. The Spanish and French attack them in a narrow ravine, where the mighty warriors are almost all destroyed and the Company must disband—only seven bowmen remain, including John. Alleyne was badly wounded when Sir Nigel sent him to alert the Prince to their plight. Sir Nigel and Aylward are missing and presumed dead. The English go on to win the Battle of Nájera, fulfilling the mission. The Prince knights Alleyne in his sick bed. Alleyne returns to England victorious with John as his squire, only to learn from a lady on the road that Maude and her mother had news that none of the White Company had survived. The lady said that love of a "golden-haired squire", who was presumed dead with the fighters, had caused Maude to decide to join a nunnery. The lady had left just before Maude was to take the veil. Alleyne rushes to the doors of the nunnery and he and Maude embrace. They marry. Alleyn and John prepare to return to find out what happened to Sir Nigel and Aylward. As Alleyne rides to see if the boat is ready to take them, he meets Aylward and Sir Nigel. They have a tale of adventure describing what occurred after they were captured by the Spanish, but eventually escaped to return to England. And everyone lives happily ever after.

== Characters ==
=== Main characters ===
- Alleyne Edricson: through the wishes of his father, he has been raised by the monks of Beaulieu Abbey. Upon reaching the age of twenty he leaves the Abbey and goes into the world. During the next two years, Alleyne becomes a squire to Sir Nigel Loring, and travels to France to join the White Company, a band of archers. When Alleyne performs a great feat of valour, he himself becomes a knight. Upon returning to England, he weds Sir Nigel's daughter.
- Sir Nigel Loring: based loosely on the real-life figure Sir Neil Loring, he is a valiant but baldheaded little knight, known and admired by every lord and soldier on both sides of the English Channel. He constantly hopes to engage in jousts and sword fights for honor and glory. He is famed for his deeds at several battles including those of Crécy and Poitiers. He is the Constable of Twynham Castle.
- Lady Maude: Sir Nigel's daughter and Alleyne's love. She has a mind of her own and is a fairly modern character. Sir Nigel knows better than to thwart her when her mind is set on something, such as loving Alleyne. He merely indicates that Alleyne should be a full knight before Alleyne proposes.
- Samkin Aylward: An elite archer who has spent most of his life as a soldier. His excellent shooting skills, hardy constitution, sense of humour and good luck have seen him through many battles, allowing him to pursue his chief pastime—wooing and flirting with women. His valour saves Sir Nigel's life on numerous occasions.
- John of Hordle, or Hordle John: Was briefly a novice at Beaulieu before being expelled from the monastery for unfitting behaviour. A huge man of great strength and sarcastic wit, he also saves the day several times, and is Alleyne's squire at the end of the novel.

=== Other characters ===
- Abbot Berghersh
- Sir Oliver Buttesthorn
- Simon Edricson, Socman of Minstead
- Walter Ford, esquire
- Goodwin Hawtayne
- Sir Claude Latour
- Lady Mary Loring
- Black Simon of Norwich
- Peter Terlake, esquire
- John Tranter

=== Historical figures who appear as characters in the novel ===
- James Audley
- Bernard Brocas
- Hugh Calveley
- Henry II of Castile
- Peter of Castile
- John Chandos
- Olivier de Clisson
- Edward III of England
- Edward the Black Prince
- Thomas Felton
- William Felton
- John of Gaunt, 1st Duke of Lancaster
- Jean III de Grailly, captal de Buch
- Bertrand du Guesclin
- Robert Knolles
- James IV of Majorca
- Charles II of Navarre
- Thomas Percy, 1st Earl of Worcester
- Sir Simon de Burley

While there was a real knight named Sir Nigel Loring at the time when the novel is set, the historical record supplied few details and his role in the book is largely Doyle's invention. He is known to have been an original member of the Order of the Garter, and to have been in the Black Prince's bodyguard, particularly at the Battle of Poitiers on 19 September 1356. He was also a member of the Prince's war council and his chamberlain, and was part of the delegation that negotiated a truce at Bordeaux. As a reward for his role in that battle, he was granted 83 pounds per annum by the Prince.

== Background ==
Conan Doyle had grown up with his mother telling him stories of chivalry, much of which fed into The White Company. He was also inspired by a visit he took in April 1889 to the New Forest, particularly to Castle Malwood in Lyndhurst. He wrote the entire novel in solitude in a small New Forest cottage, chiefly in an attempt to capture the history and splendour of the region. The novel was finished in the Summer of 1890, and it was published in instalments in The Cornhill Magazine between January and December 1891. The book was very successful, selling out rapidly; it also met with positive reviews.

== Influence ==
- Amory Blaine, the protagonist in F. Scott Fitzgerald's 1920 novel This Side of Paradise, reads The White Company early in the book.
- Several of the characters in S. M. Stirling's Emberverse novels share names with characters from this book and are apparently descendants or reincarnations of the characters, and Stirling has acknowledged its influence on his own writing.
- Two minor character names appear in the American film A Knight's Tale (2001), specifically "Delves of Dodgington" (Delves of Doddington in the novel) and "Fowlehurst of Crewe" as fake names for the characters Roland and Wat, respectively. Delves and Fowlehurst were both historic characters being squires of Sir James Audley at the Battle of Poitiers.
