= Octave Penguilly L'Haridon =

French painter

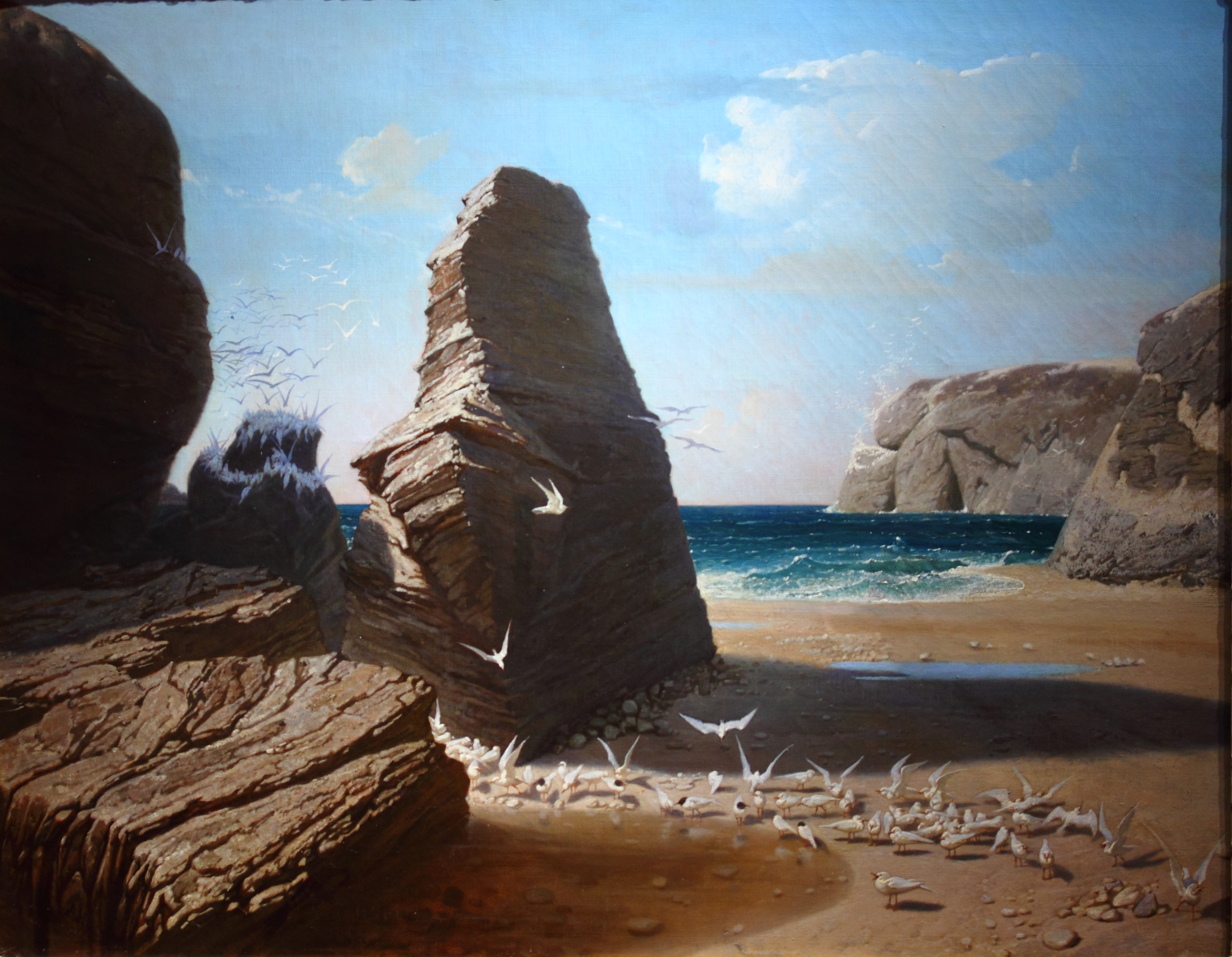
Les Petites mouettes

Octave Penguilly L'Haridon (French pronunciation: [ɔktav pɛ̃ɡili laʁidɔ̃]; 18 April 1811 – 3 November 1870) was a French painter known for his works depicting Breton landscape, myths and history. He was also curator of the military Musée de l'Artillerie (Museum of Armaments) in Paris.

== Career ==
Originally from Pleyben, in Brittany, Penguilly L'Haridon trained to become an artillery officer in the French military. However, by 1835, was also taking drawing lessons. By the 1840s he was designing illustrations for books, generally on Breton topics.

=== Curatorial work ===
After retiring from active military service, in 1854 he was appointed as curator of the Musée de l'Artillerie in Paris, a position he retained for many years. In this capacity he helped to defend the authenticity of ancient flint tools discovered in Pressigny-le-Grand. In 1862 he wrote and published a comprehensive catalogue of the museum's collection, including an account of the origins and history of the museum itself.

=== Art ===
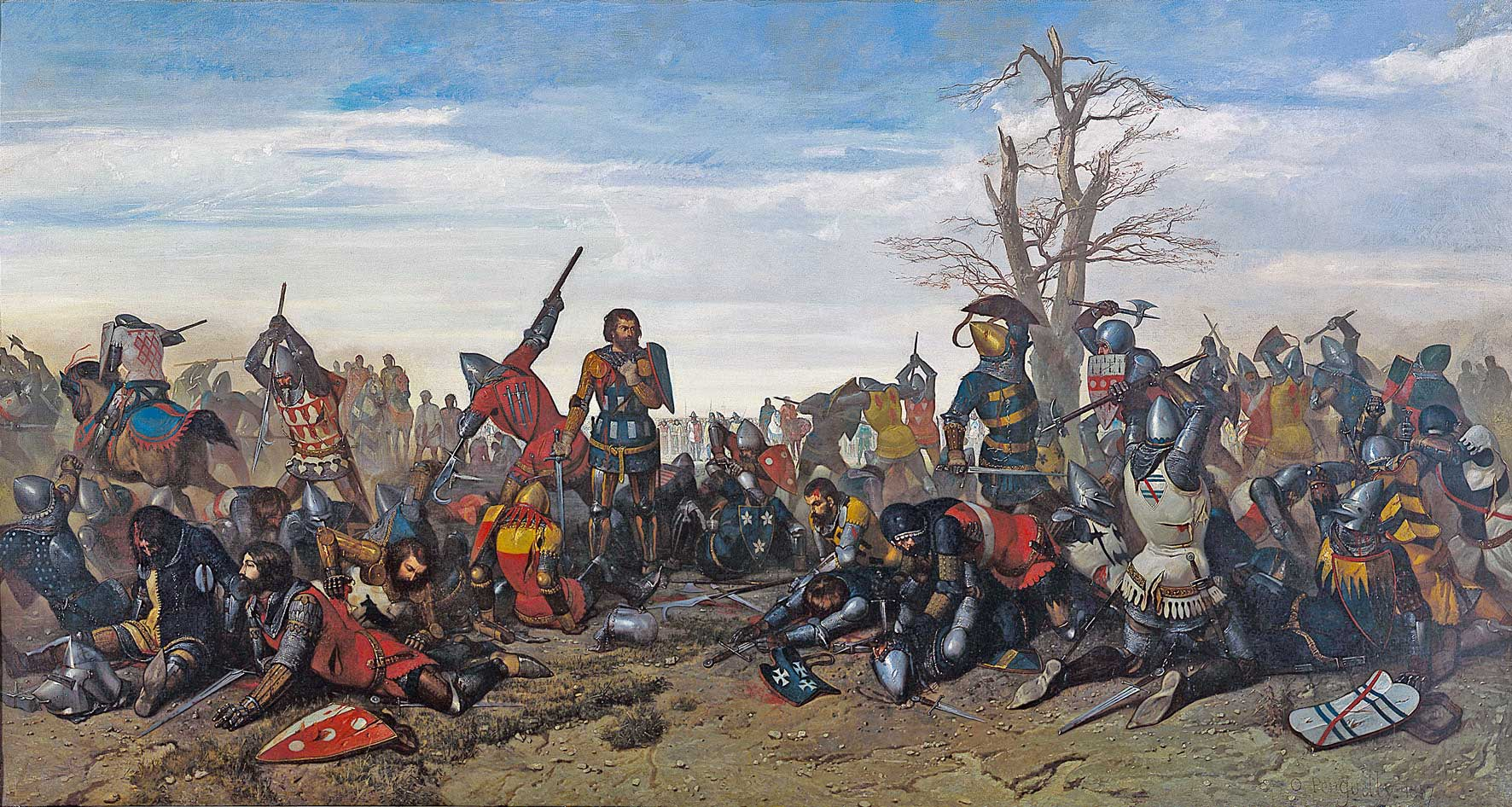
Penguilly L'Haridon's The Combat of the Thirty (1857)

He showed works in various exhibitions throughout his life. Though generally considered an exponent of academic art, he could also be experimental. In 1859 he showed at the Salon of 1859 a landscape entitled Les Petites mouettes ("Little Gulls") (1858, Musée des Beaux-Arts de Rennes), depicting a bleak rocky inlet on Belle Île. The subject, composition and the colours of the work are in complete break with the established convention. The picture was praised by Maxime du Camp and Charles Baudelaire, who referred to the sense of the uncanny, as though the rocks make "a portal open to infinity...a wound of white birds, and the solitude!"

Many of his works were inspired by the Breton landscape and the region's history. Several were used as illustrations in books on the region. His most notable work is the historical painting The Combat of the Thirty (1857, Musée des Beaux-Arts de Quimper). The elaborate frieze-like composition portrays the Combat of the Thirty a famous episode in medieval chivalry during the Breton War of Succession. It depicts a late stage in the battle, when the dazed and exhausted combatants continue to hack away at one another on the verge of total collapse. It was exhibited at the Salon of 1857 The Revue française saw it as an example of L'Haridon's genuine interest in medieval culture, but objected that,

This is not history herself: living, human, full-blooded [...]. Skillful, ingenious, knowledgeable, well informed about all matters medieval... it lacks the most important quality - life.

Penguilly L'Haridon increasingly became interested in combining history with science. He painted a picture entitled Stone Age representing primeval culture. He chose to reform traditional religious iconography in his painting Les bergers, conduits par l'étoile, se rendent à Bethléem, depicting the shepherds led by the star to travel to Bethlehem (1863, Musée d'Orsay). Indeed, the shepherds are represented here as modern Bedouins with their dogs, and the "Bethlehem" to which they travel is a small settlement in the desert, indicated by the star. His version of the arrival of the Magi is equally unusual, portraying another desert-like foreground, with the Magi arriving in a procession in the middle distance, led by an Indian elephant.
