= The Combat of the Thirty =

Painting by Octave Penguilly L'Haridon

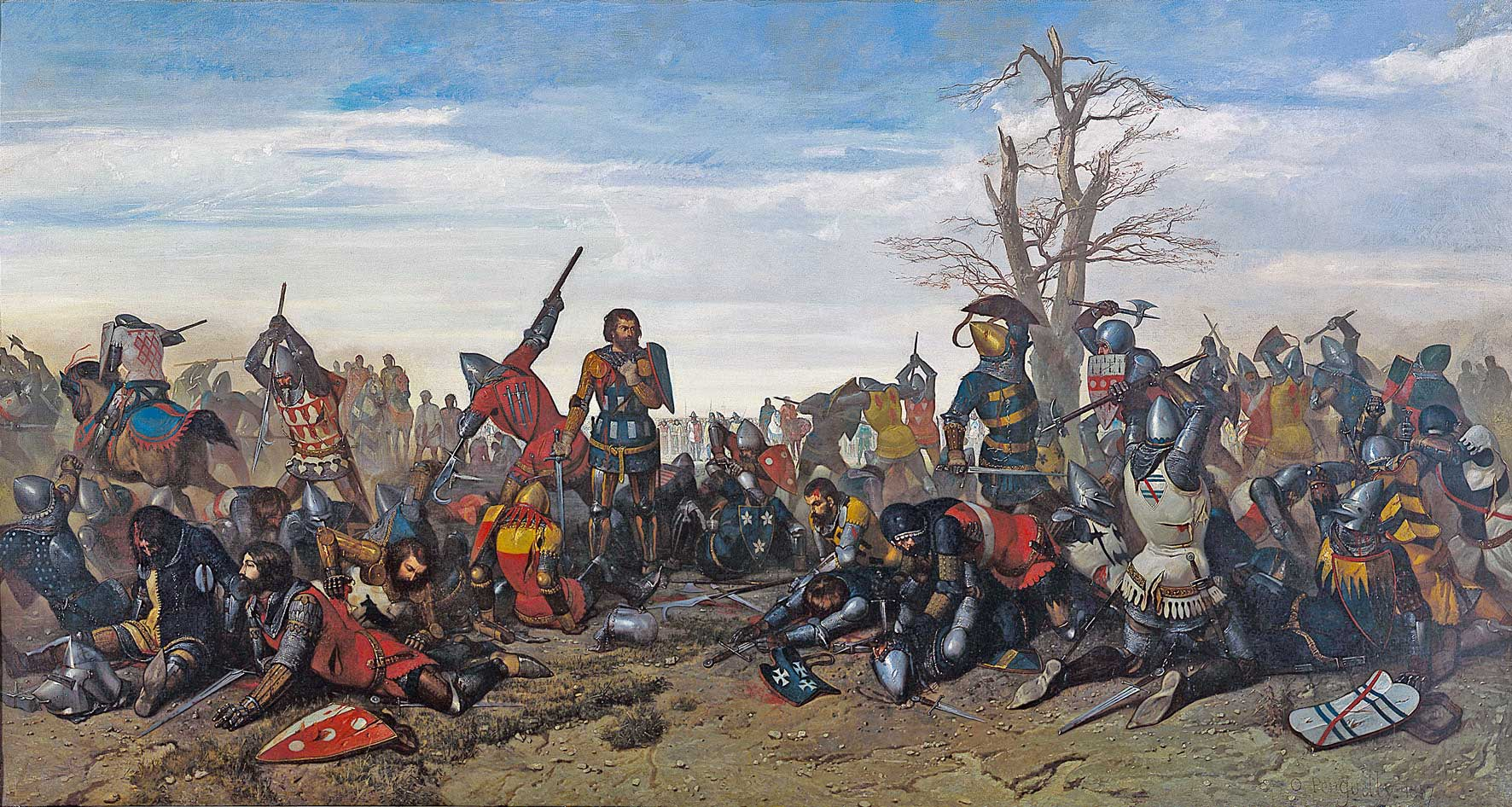
- Artist: Octave Penguilly L'Haridon
- Year: 1857
- Type: Oil on canvas, history painting
- Dimensions: 145 cm × 268 cm (57 in × 106 in)
- Location: Musée des Beaux-Arts de Quimper, Brittany

The Combat of the Thirty (French: Le Combat des Trente) is an 1857 history painting by the French artist Octave Penguilly L'Haridon. It depicts the Combat of the Thirty fought on 26 March 1351 during the War of the Breton Succession. A notable scene in the History of Brittany, it featured a pre-arranged fight between selected fighters on either side.

The painting was exhibited at the Salon of 1857 in Paris. Today it is on display at the Musée des Beaux-Arts de Quimper.

== Bibliography ==
- Chanoir, Isabelle. La muse bretonne: collections du Musée des beaux-arts de Rennes de 1850 à 1950. Musée des beaux-arts de Rennes, 2000.
- Delouche, Denise & Michaud, Jean-Marc. Bretagne: terre des peintres. Cloître, 2003.
