= Ploërmel astronomical clock =

Coordinates: 47.9314°N 2.3996°W

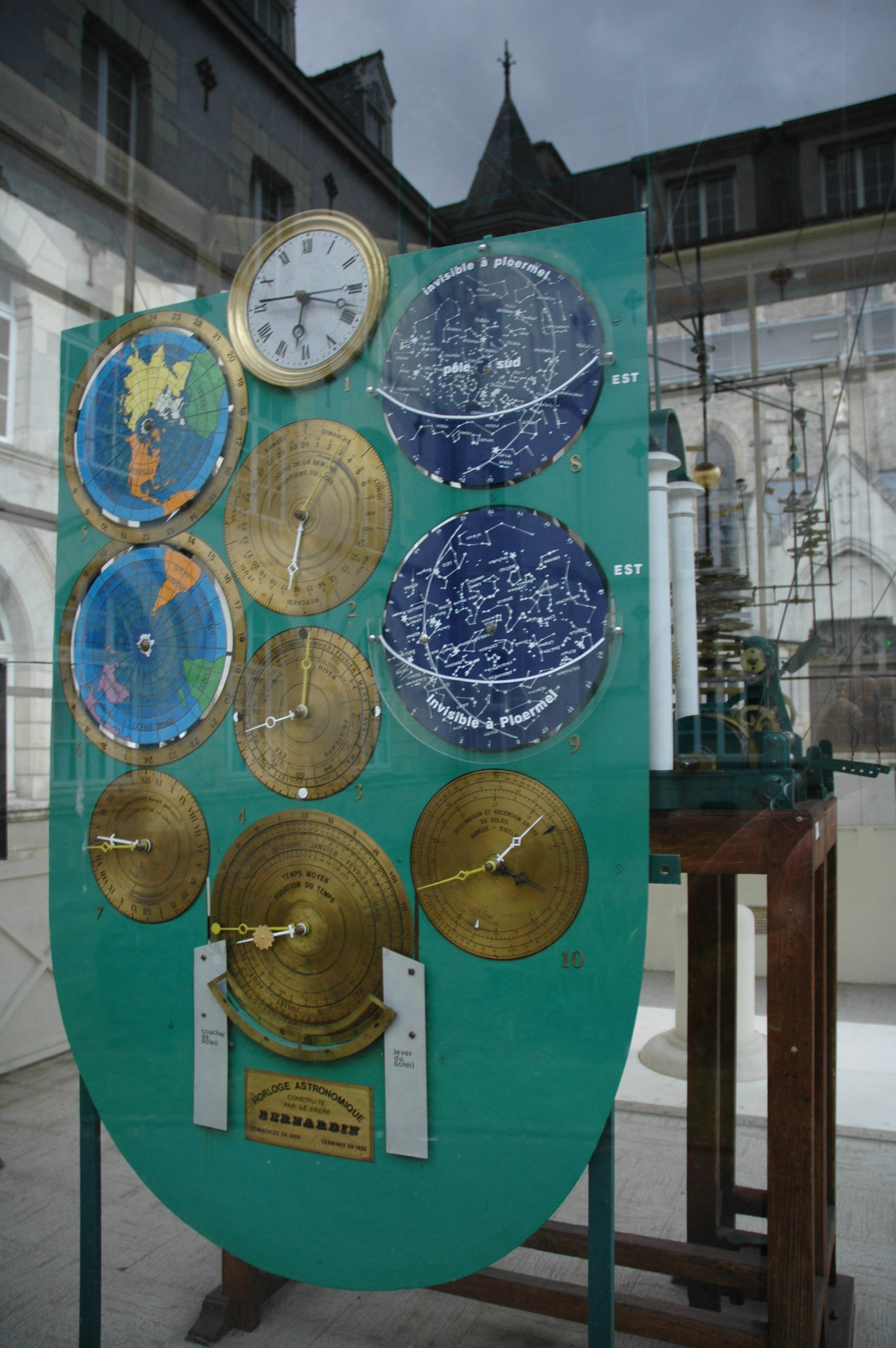
Ploërmel Astronomical clock

The Ploërmel Astronomical Clock is a 19th-century astronomical clock in Ploërmel in Brittany, in north-west France.

== History and description ==
The clock was built and operational by 1855. It was constructed by Brother Bernardin (1812−1876) of the Community of Brothers of The Mother House of the Brothers of Ploërmel. The clock was originally inside the monastic building, it is now displayed in a glazed kiosk in the interior court of the cloisters.

It comprises an astronomical clock and an orrery displaying all the planets known at that time. The Earth is especially well represented with its correct inclination and the moon encircling it

== Astronomical clock ==
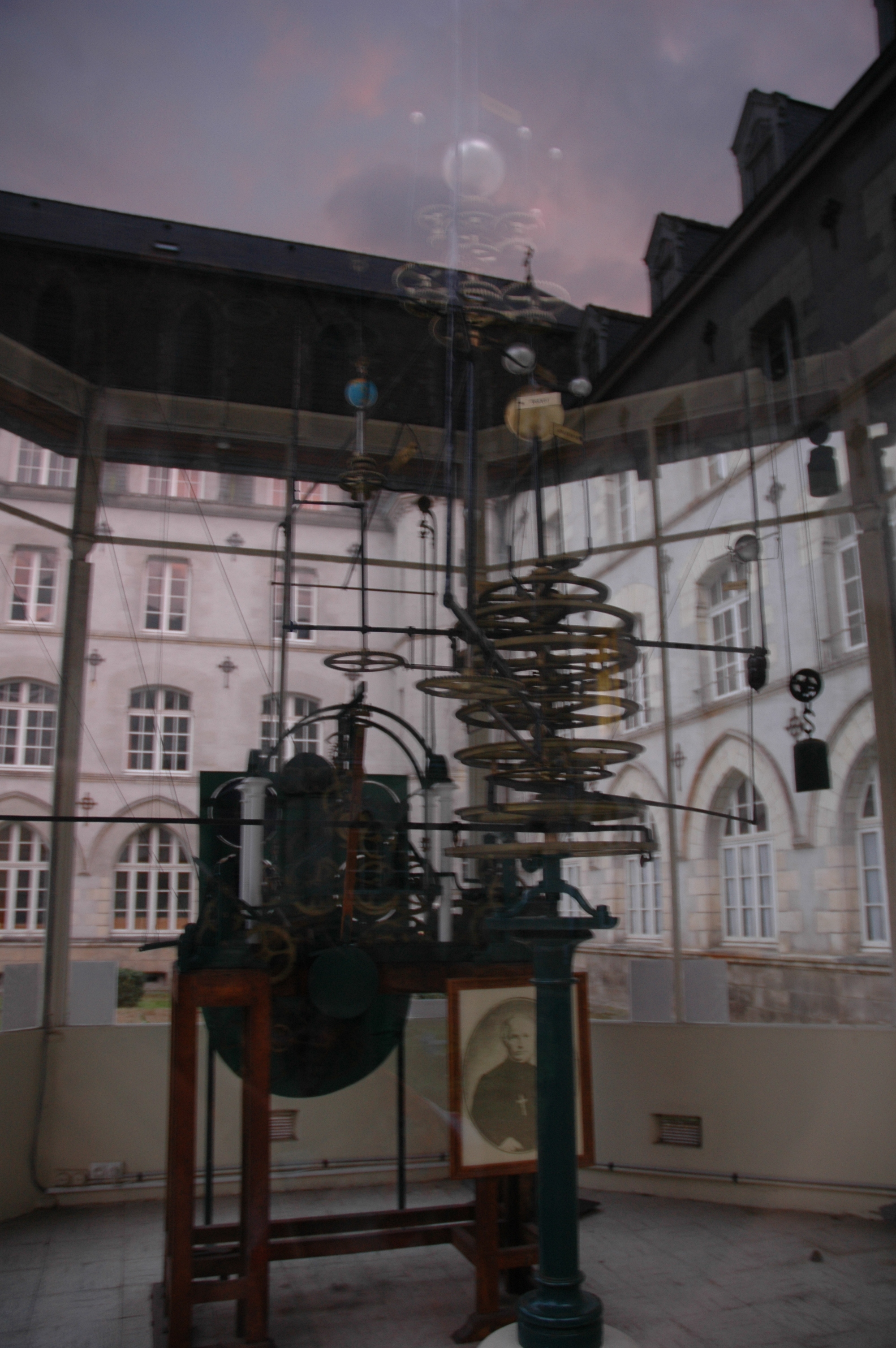
Ploërmel Astronomical Clock

The clock has ten dials which show:

- Dial 1. Solar time
- Dial 2. Calendar
- Dial 3. Position of the Moon, the months of the year, seasons and signs of the zodiac
- Dial 4. The equation of time (the difference between mean time and real time)
- Dials 5 and 6. The standard time to the nearest minute for the whole world.
- Dial 7. The position of the Moon, Earth and Sun.
- Dials 8 and 9. The view of the heavens over Ploërmel.
- Dial 10. The position of the Sun on the ecliptic, and the centuries. The small black hand rotates once every 1000 years.

== Orrery ==
The Orrery displays the Sun, Mercury, Venus, Earth, Mars, Jupiter, Saturn and Uranus, together with the Moon, the four satellites of Jupiter and the six satellites of Saturn. It was constructed around the time of the discovery of Neptune, and before Pluto, and these two planets are not shown.
