= Monterrein =

Monterrein Mousterrin
- Part of Ploërmel
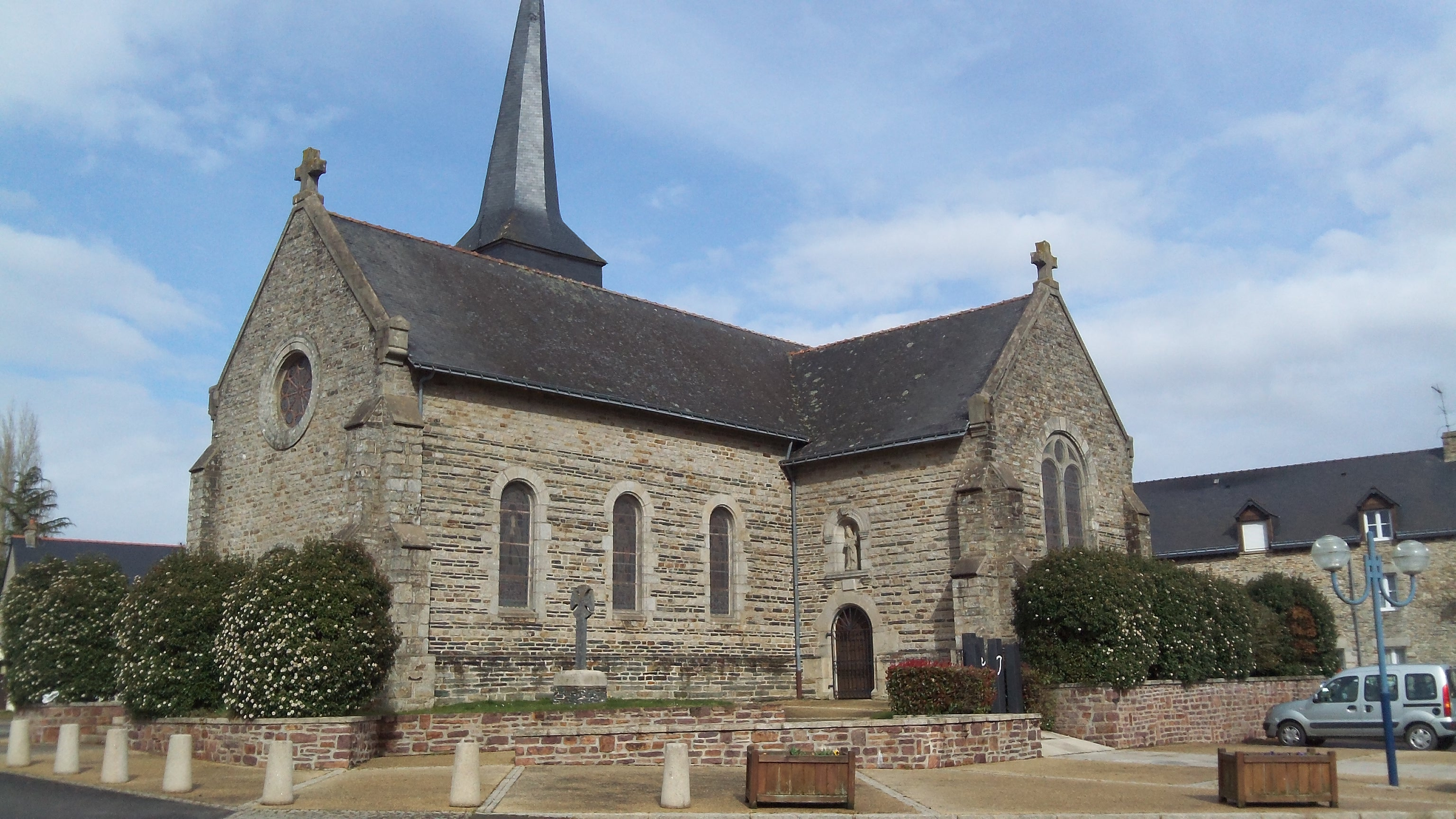
- The church of Saint-Malo, in Monterrein

- Coat of arms
- Location of Monterrein
- Location within France Location within Brittany
- Coordinates: 47°52′52″N 2°21′24″W
- Country: France
- Region: Brittany
- Department: Morbihan
- Arrondissement: Pontivy
- Canton: Ploërmel
- Commune: Ploërmel
- Area^{1}: 7.01 km^{2} (2.71 sq mi)
- Highest elevation: 126 m (413 ft)
- Lowest elevation: 59 m (194 ft)
- Population (2018): 396
  - Density: 56.5/km^{2} (146/sq mi)
- Time zone: UTC+01:00 (CET)
  - Summer (DST): UTC+02:00 (CEST)
- Postal code: 56800
- ^{1} French Land Register data, which excludes lakes, ponds, glaciers > 1 km^{2} (0.386 sq mi or 247 acres) and river estuaries.

Monterrein (French pronunciation: [mɔ̃tɛʁɛ̃]; Breton: Mousterrin) is a former commune in the Morbihan department of Brittany in north-western France. On 1 January 2019, it was merged into the commune Ploërmel. Inhabitants of Monterrein are called in French Monterrinois.

== See also ==
- Communes of the Morbihan department
