= Pierre Le Baud =

French clergyman

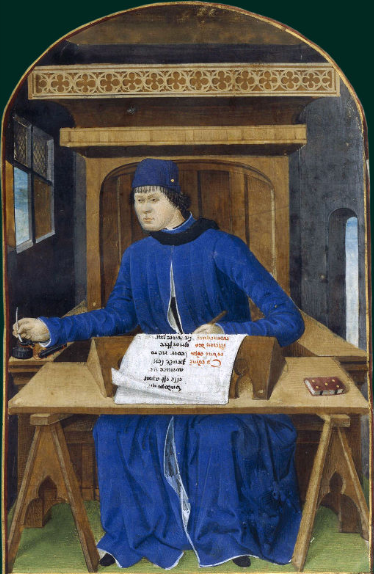
Le Baud depicted in the Derval manuscript

Pierre Le Baud or Lebaud (c. 1450 – 29 September 1505) was a French clergyman and historian known for his writings on the history of Brittany.

== Life ==
Lebaud was born around 1450, probably in Saint-Ouën-des-Toits, Maine, on the borders of Brittany. His father, Jean le Baud, was a knight and lord of Saint-Ouen in Maine. His mother, Jeanne de Châteaugiron, was the bastard of Patry de Châteaugiron and Derval. She was related to the Laval family. His sister, Perrine le Baud, was the wife of Jean d'Argentré and was the grandmother of the Breton historiograph of the Renaissance Bertrand d'Argentré, seneschal of Rennes.

Pierre le Baud held several ecclesiastical and aulic offices at the court of Brittany.

On entering the church he became attached to the diocese of Nantes. He became cantor and chaplain of Laval Cathedral and went on to serve as chaplain to local dignitary, Guy de Laval, and then to Margaret of Foix, wife of Francis II, Duke of Brittany. After the duke's death he became chaplain to the new duchess, his daughter Anne of Brittany. He served as chaplain to her. He was also Anne de Bretagne’s close adviser and confessor. He seems to have supported Anne's marriage to King Charles VIII of France.

Lebaud died on 29 September 1505. The exact date is known because of a note written by his nephew, Bertrand d'Argentré, also a clergyman and historian, who continued Le Baud's work.

== Works ==
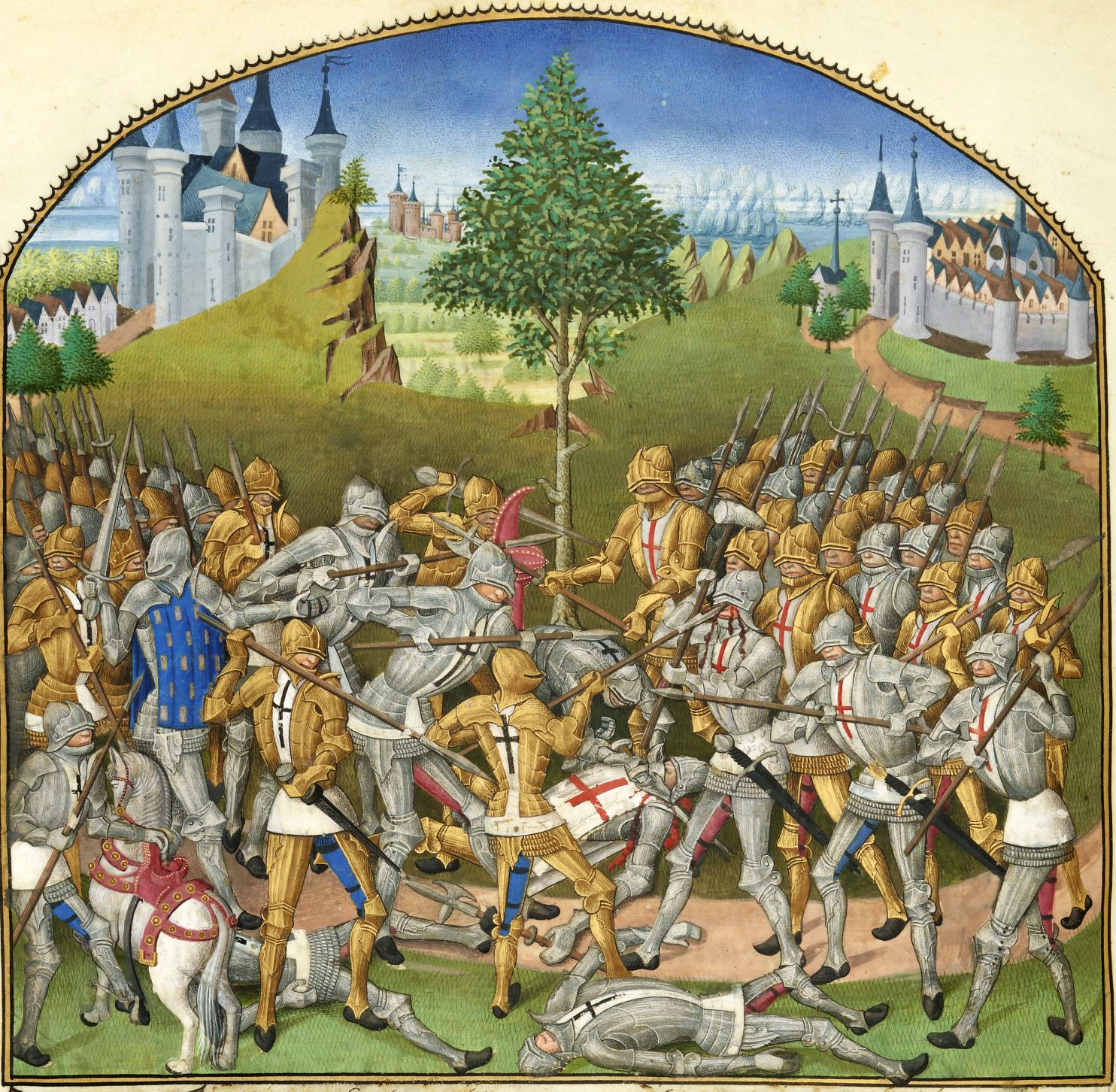
An illustration of the Combat des Trente (Combat of the Thirty): an illumination in a manuscript of Le Baud's Compillation des cronicques et ystoires des Bretons (1480)

Le Baud compiled two histories of Brittany. The first was created during Duke Francis' reign, and involves complex genealogical arguments designed to establish the legitimacy and antiquity of the Montfort dynasty. Known as Compillation des cronicques et ystoires des Bretons (Compilation of the Chronicles and Histories of the Bretons), it tells the stories of the ancient Britons from the mythical Trojan Brut; the migration of the Britons to Brittany; and Breton history up to the death of Arthur III, Duke of Brittany in 1458. It was later translated into Latin by Bertrand d'Argentré, who continued the narrative up to his own day, in the reign of king Francis I. This manuscript was commissioned by Jean de Derval and dedicated to him.

In addition to its own value, Le Baud's "Compilation" is important because it incorporates verbatim, and thus preserves, some very early literature of the history of Brittany, such as the Life of Saint Goeznovius and the Chronicle of Nantes.

His second chronicle, Cronique des roys et princes de Bretaigne armoricane (Chronicle of the Kings and Princes of Armorican Britain) was completed in 1505, having been written at the request of the Duchess Anne.

Le Baud also wrote a number of other works, including Chronicles of Vitré; Le Discours de l'Origine et Antiquité de Laval and Le Bréviaire des Bretons, an account in verse of British/Breton history which includes a version of the story of King Lear.

Le Baud's writings were first published in print in 1638 by Pierre d'Hozier, who complied several works under the title Histoire de Bretagne, avec les chroniques des maisons de Vitré et de Laval. Arthur de La Borderie observed that there were some significant differences between d'Hosier's edition and a surviving early manuscript of one of the works in the Bibliothèque nationale de France.
