= Josselin =

Commune in Brittany, France

Josselin Josilin
- Commune
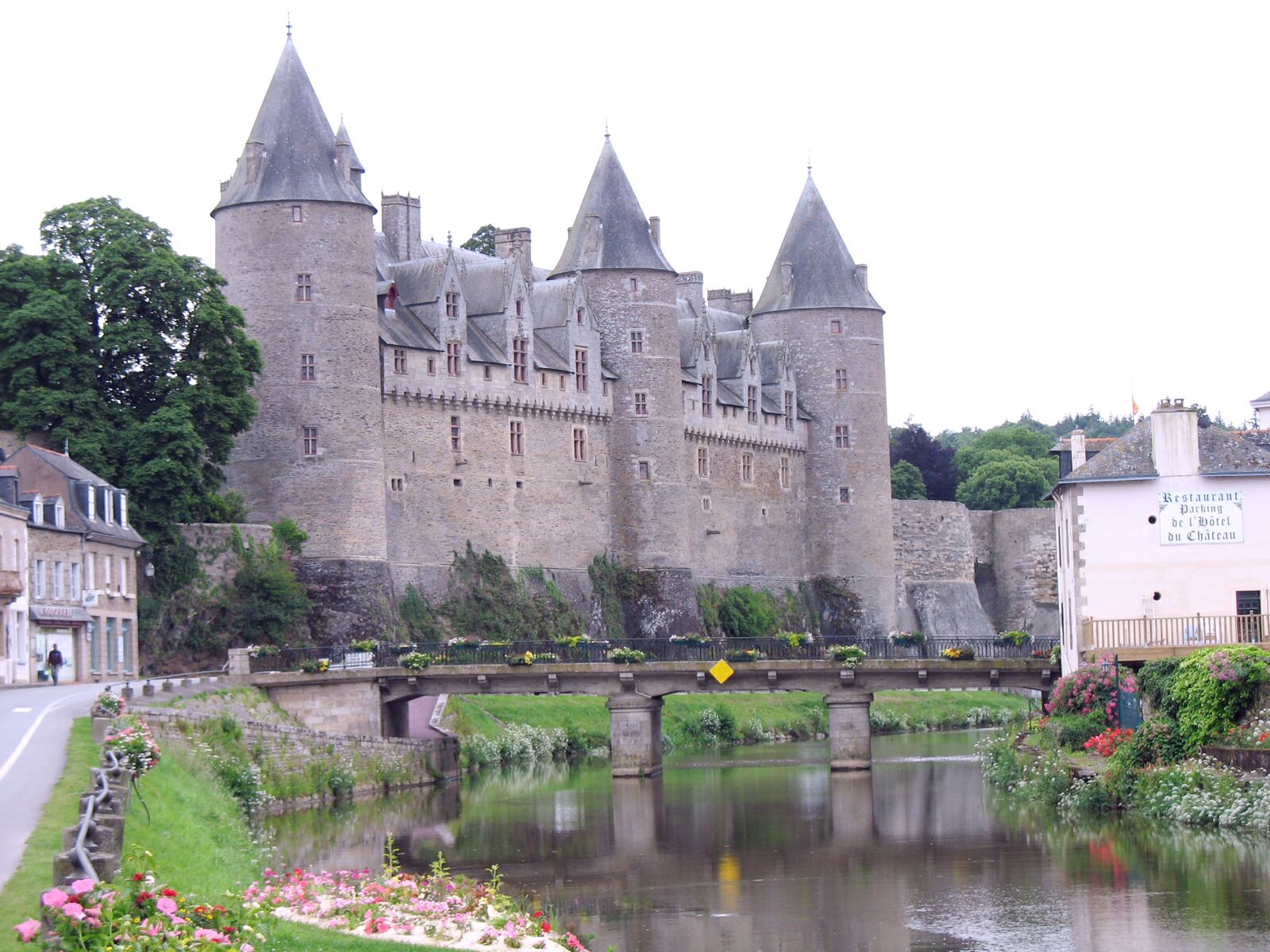
- View of Josselin Castle from the River Oust

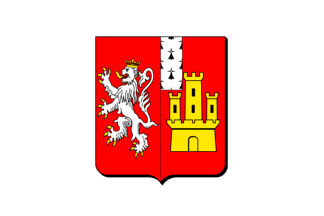
- Flag Coat of arms
- Location of Josselin
- Location within France Location within Brittany
- Coordinates: 47°57′24″N 2°32′50″W
- Country: France
- Region: Brittany
- Department: Morbihan
- Arrondissement: Pontivy
- Canton: Ploërmel
- Intercommunality: Ploërmel Communauté

Government
  - Mayor (2026–32): Nicolas Jagoudet
- Area^{1}: 4.48 km^{2} (1.73 sq mi)
- Elevation: 30 m (98 ft)
- Highest elevation: 93 m (305 ft)
- Lowest elevation: 32 m (105 ft)
- Population (2023): 2,584
  - Density: 577/km^{2} (1,490/sq mi)
- Time zone: UTC+01:00 (CET)
  - Summer (DST): UTC+02:00 (CEST)
- INSEE/Postal code: 56091 /56120
- ^{1} French Land Register data, which excludes lakes, ponds, glaciers > 1 km^{2} (0.386 sq mi or 247 acres) and river estuaries.

Josselin (French pronunciation: [ʒɔslɛ̃]; Breton: Josilin) is a commune in the Morbihan department in Brittany in northwestern France.

The commune is listed as a Village étape.

== History ==
Banner attributed to Breton and French Knights at the Combat of the Thirty in 1351.

St Meriadek is said to have founded a chapel there during the 4th century. Much later Josselin became a stronghold of the House of Rohan.

An alternative explanation for the location of the chapel concerns a labourer who in 808 discovered a wooden statue in the brambles which enabled his hitherto blind daughter to see. A chapel was constructed on the site of this miracle which subsequently grew into a church (parts of which date back to the twelfth century). A fresco in the church now recalls the Combat of the Thirty summarized below.

In 1351, during the Breton War of Succession (part of the Hundred Years' War), two groups of approximately 30 English knights (led by Robert Bramborough, the English captain of Ploërmel) and Franco-Breton knights (commanded by Jean de Beaumanoir, captain of Josselin) staged an arranged combat at a spot halfway between the Chateau de Josselin and Ploërmel. The Franco-Breton side eventually won after killing or capturing the English force, including Bramborough. This episode was later known as the Combat of the Thirty.

The Castle of Josselin can still be seen today, although only four of the original nine towers remain after the Cardinal Richelieu ordered the castle partially demolished in 1629.

== Population ==
Historical population
Year	Pop.	±% p.a.
1968	2,283	—
1975	2,611	+1.94%
1982	2,548	−0.35%
1990	2,338	−1.07%
1999	2,419	+0.38%
2007	2,578	+0.80%
2012	2,453	−0.99%
2017	2,495	+0.34%
2023	2,584	+0.59%
Source: INSEE

Inhabitants of Josselin are called Josselinais in French.

== Breton language ==
In 2008, 16.05% of children attended the bilingual schools in primary education.

== Twin towns ==
Josselin is twinned with:

Alzey, Germany
Tard, Hungary
(United Kingdom) Brechin, Scotland, UK

== See also ==
- Communes of the Morbihan department
