= Ploërmel =

Ploërmel Ploermael (Breton)
- Commune
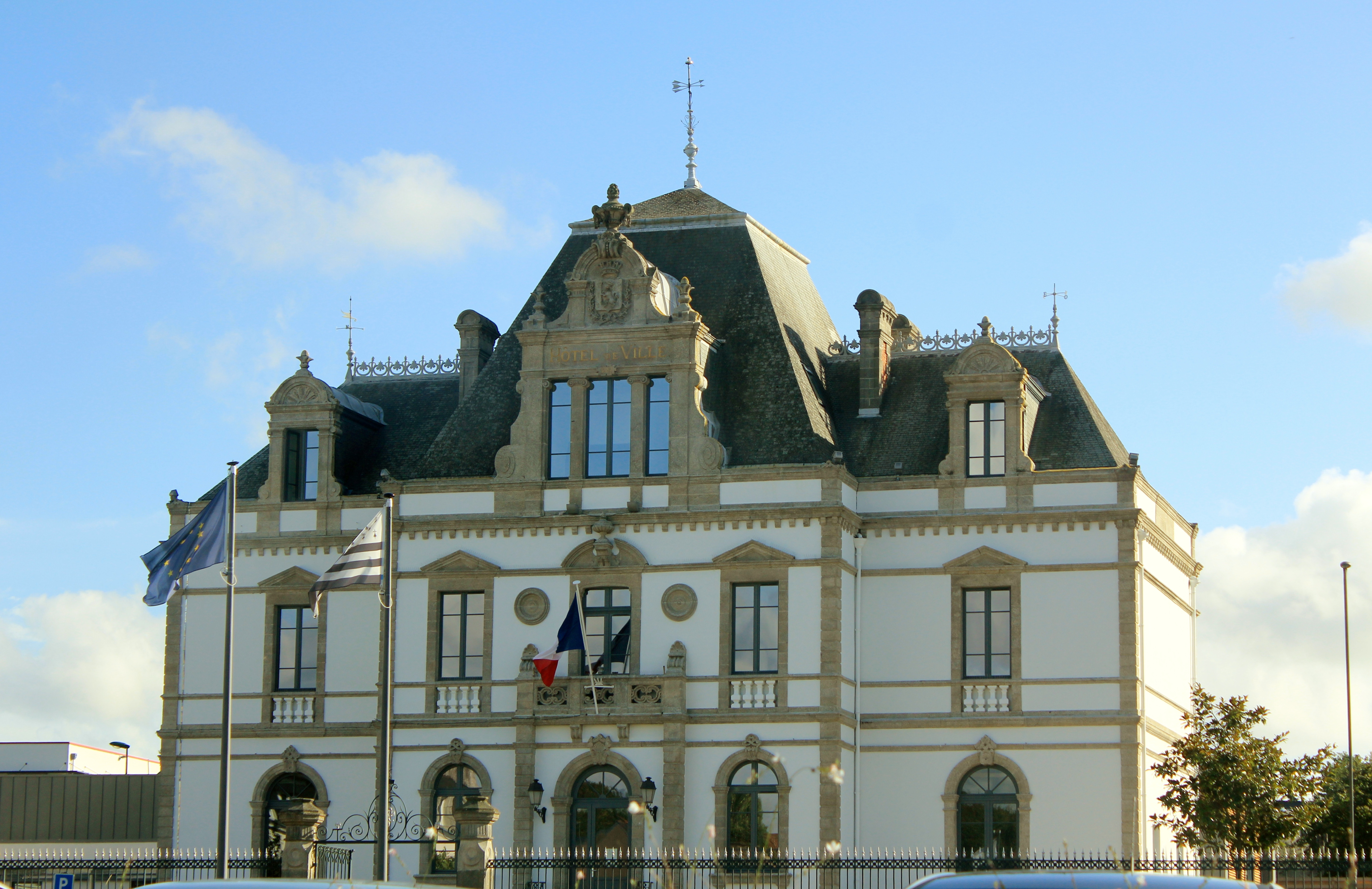
- The town hall in Ploërmel

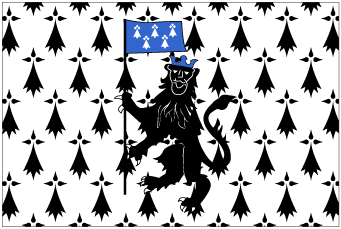
- Flag Coat of arms
- Location of Ploërmel
- Location within France Location within Brittany
- Coordinates: 47°55′57″N 2°23′46″W
- Country: France
- Region: Brittany
- Department: Morbihan
- Arrondissement: Pontivy
- Canton: Ploërmel
- Intercommunality: Ploërmel

Government
  - Mayor (2026–32): Christophe Launay
- Area^{1}: 58.44 km^{2} (22.56 sq mi)
- Elevation: 75 m (246 ft)
- Highest elevation: 126 m (413 ft)
- Lowest elevation: 19 m (62 ft)
- Population (2023): 10,163
  - Density: 173.9/km^{2} (450.4/sq mi)
- Time zone: UTC+01:00 (CET)
  - Summer (DST): UTC+02:00 (CEST)
- INSEE/Postal code: 56165 /56800
- ^{1} French Land Register data, which excludes lakes, ponds, glaciers > 1 km^{2} (0.386 sq mi or 247 acres) and river estuaries.

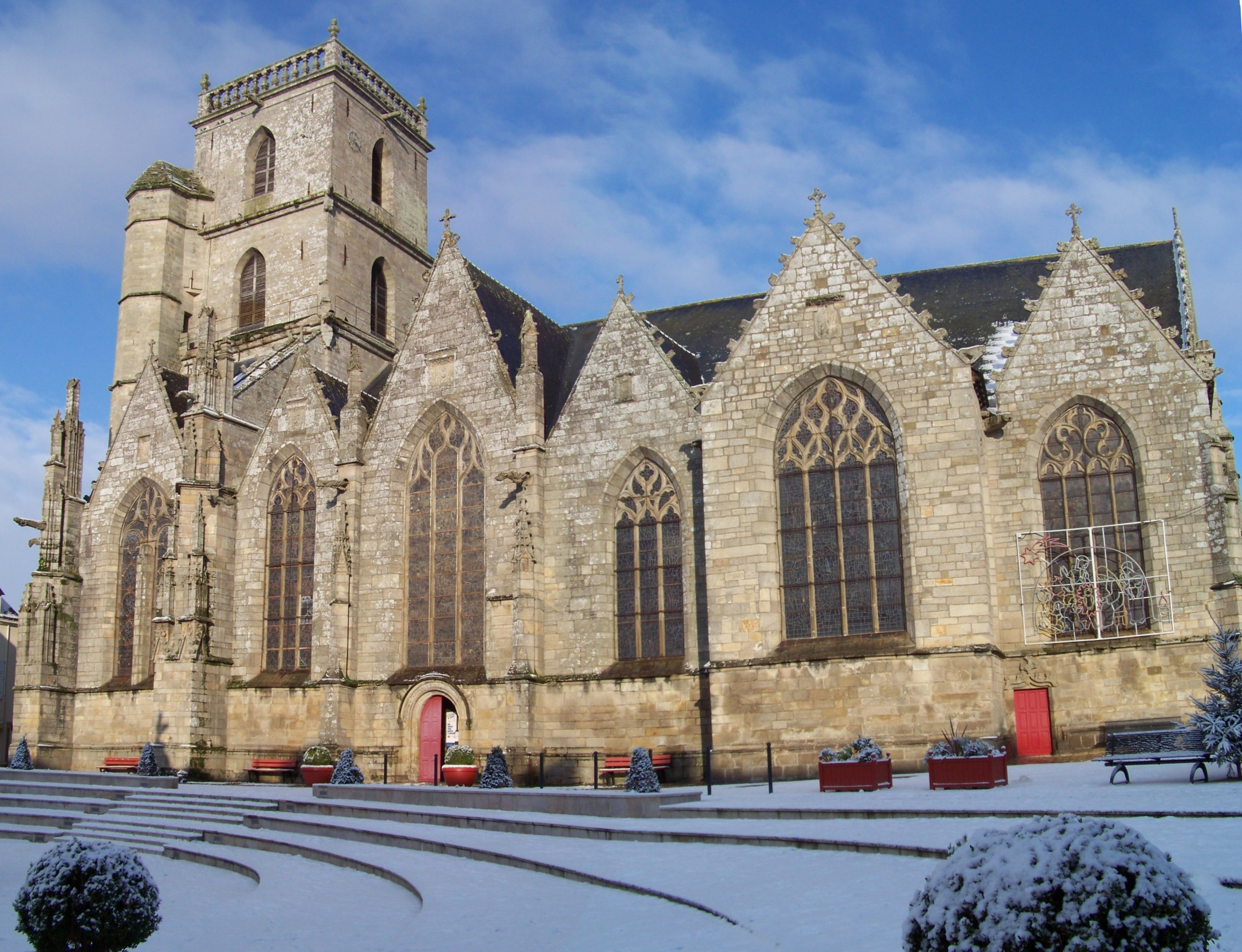
Church Saint-Armel

Ploërmel (French: [ploɛʁmɛl]; Breton: Ploermael; Gallo language: Pieurmè) is a commune in the Morbihan department in Brittany, in north-western France. On 1 January 2019, the former commune Monterrein was merged into Ploërmel.

== Character of the town ==
The town is both modern and medieval, and has easy access to most parts of Brittany. Ploërmel is set on the edge of the Brocéliande forest, which legend proclaims is the home of Merlin the Magician, amongst other fantastical characters.

== History ==
In 1351, during the Breton War of Succession (part of the Hundred Years' War), the town was occupied by the Montfortist faction, supported by the English. The rival French-supported Blois faction controlled nearby Josselin. Two groups of approximately 30 English and French knights staged a tournament at a spot between the two towns, to show their prowess and make money by capturing opponents. The Franco-Breton team eventually won after killing or capturing the Anglo-Breton force. This was later known as the Combat of the Thirty.

In 1944, 10 Resistance fighters were killed by German soldiers. 31 inhabitants were killed, 125 wounded, by the American air raid on the railway station on 12 June, during the Normandy landings.

On 10 December 2006, the city unveiled a statue of Pope John Paul II. It was a gift by Russo-Georgian sculptor Zurab Tsereteli, and has sparked controversy over the separation of Church and State.

The town gave its name to a monastic order, the Brothers of Ploërmel. The Doctor Who actor Tom Baker was a monk of the order for a while in Jersey.

In 2008 from 24 May till 1 June 2008 the City of Ploërmel became the first City in France to host the International Federation of Carnival Cities Congress. The Ploërmel Carnival is the largest in central Brittany and is held on Saturdays at the beginning and end of May.

== Population ==
Inhabitants of Ploërmel are called Ploërmelais in French. Population data refer to the area corresponding with the commune as of January 2025.

Historical population
Year	Pop.	±% p.a.
1968	6,235	—
1975	6,584	+0.78%
1982	6,896	+0.66%
1990	7,294	+0.70%
1999	7,833	+0.80%
2007	9,016	+1.77%
2012	9,771	+1.62%
2017	9,837	+0.13%
2023	10,163	+0.54%
Source: INSEE

== Breton language ==
In 2008, just 2.62% of the town's children received either Breton-medium or bilingual education.

== Twin towns ==
- Cobh, Republic of Ireland
- Apensen, Germany
- Gornau, Germany
- Gorseinon & Llwchwr, Wales
- Kolbuszowa, Poland
- Dabola, Guinea

== Cultural references ==
An 1859 French opéra comique with music by Giacomo Meyerbeer, Le pardon de Ploërmel (The Pardon of Ploërmel), was about an annual procession in Ploermel.

Ploërmel was one of the favourite places of the South African-born British female composer, Priaulx Rainier. She evoked the place in her work for winds and percussion, Ploërmel (1973).

== Climate ==
Climate data for Ploërmel (1991–2020 normals, extremes 1951–present)
Month	Jan	Feb	Mar	Apr	May	Jun	Jul	Aug	Sep	Oct	Nov	Dec	Year
Record high °C (°F)	18.8 (65.8)	21.3 (70.3)	23.9 (75.0)	27.7 (81.9)	32.8 (91.0)	38.7 (101.7)	39.5 (103.1)	38.6 (101.5)	35.3 (95.5)	29.2 (84.6)	22.1 (71.8)	18.5 (65.3)	39.5 (103.1)
Mean daily maximum °C (°F)	9.0 (48.2)	10.0 (50.0)	12.7 (54.9)	15.5 (59.9)	18.8 (65.8)	21.9 (71.4)	24.2 (75.6)	24.3 (75.7)	21.5 (70.7)	16.8 (62.2)	12.4 (54.3)	9.5 (49.1)	16.4 (61.5)
Daily mean °C (°F)	6.2 (43.2)	6.5 (43.7)	8.5 (47.3)	10.5 (50.9)	13.7 (56.7)	16.7 (62.1)	18.6 (65.5)	18.7 (65.7)	16.1 (61.0)	12.8 (55.0)	9.1 (48.4)	6.6 (43.9)	12.0 (53.6)
Mean daily minimum °C (°F)	3.3 (37.9)	3.0 (37.4)	4.3 (39.7)	5.5 (41.9)	8.6 (47.5)	11.4 (52.5)	13.1 (55.6)	13.0 (55.4)	10.7 (51.3)	8.9 (48.0)	5.7 (42.3)	3.6 (38.5)	7.6 (45.7)
Record low °C (°F)	−15.4 (4.3)	−14.5 (5.9)	−8.4 (16.9)	−5.0 (23.0)	−2.5 (27.5)	0.8 (33.4)	4.1 (39.4)	3.5 (38.3)	0.3 (32.5)	−4.4 (24.1)	−8.3 (17.1)	−11.8 (10.8)	−15.4 (4.3)
Average precipitation mm (inches)	84.1 (3.31)	62.8 (2.47)	52.8 (2.08)	57.6 (2.27)	57.7 (2.27)	52.8 (2.08)	40.2 (1.58)	47.4 (1.87)	56.7 (2.23)	80.9 (3.19)	85.0 (3.35)	89.2 (3.51)	767.2 (30.20)
Average precipitation days (≥ 1.0 mm)	12.3	10.4	9.5	10.0	9.3	8.1	7.5	6.9	7.8	11.7	13.0	13.0	119.4
Source: Meteociel

== See also ==
- Ploërmel Astronomical Clock
