= DeBrosse =

De Brosse Coat of Arms

Debrosse, de Brosse, de La Brosse, or de la Broce is a French surname. Notable people with the surname include:

- Pierre de la Broce (died 1278), French councilor to Phillip III
- Jean de Brosse (1375–1433), Marshal of France
- Jean II de Brosse (1432–1482), chamberlain to the King of France
- Claudine de Brosse (1450–1513), French noble
- Jacques de la Brosse (c. 1485–1562), French soldier and diplomat, cupbearer to Francis I
- Jean III de Brosse (died 1502), French noble
- René de Brosse (died 1525), French noble and soldier
- Jean IV de Brosse (1505–1564), French noble
- Salomon de Brosse (1571–1626), French architect
- Guy de La Brosse (1586–1641), French botanist, doctor, and pharmacist
- Joseph de la Brosse (1636–1697), known as Ange de Saint Joseph
- Charles de Brosses (1709–1777), French noble and writer
- Simon de La Brosse (1965–1998), French actor
- Joasil Déméus Débrosse (1968–2013), Haitian journalist
- Laurent Debrosse (born 1969), French footballer

== See also ==
- Brosse
- La Brosse
- Labrosse (disambiguation)
- Bross
- La Brosse-Montceaux, a commune in the Seine-et-Marne department in France
