= Province of Brittany =

Historical province of France

The Province of Brittany was a division of France that existed from 1532 until 1790. It was formed at the time that the previous Duchy of Brittany became unified with France by an edict. It was dissolved after the French Revolution in 1790 along with all the other provinces of France.

== 15th and 16th centuries ==
Although before 1536 Brittany was in theory under French control, it had been de facto independent. Its main government institution was the Estates of Brittany. It was created as a French province by the Edict of Union issued in 1532.

The origins of the Province of Brittany date back to before it was fully integrated into France, beginning when Charles VIII took control in 1491. At that time, he started to dismantle some of the institutions of the Duchy of Brittany and replaced the Montfort loyalists with his own supporters. However, many of these institutions were restored in 1498 after Charles's death, when Anne of Brittany assumed power.

When Francis III, Duke of Brittany died in 1536 he was succeeded by his brother Henry, who was the first person to become both King of France and Duke of Brittany in his own right. Any trace of Breton independence ended with the accession of Henry to the French throne as Henry II. From that point onward, the region functioned as the Province of Brittany. The French Crown and the Breton Duchy were now united through inheritance, effectively completing Brittany’s integration into France. Henry II was not separately crowned as Duke of Brittany. However, he did attempt to establish a distinct legal status for Brittany within the Kingdom of France, similar to the relationship between the Duchy of Cornwall and the Kingdom of England. According to some historical accounts, Brittany was intended to serve as a ducal territory that the king could retain for himself and his heirs in the event he lost the French Crown. However, this attempt to establish a separate legal status for Brittany did not outlast Henry’s reign.

Although Brittany was unified into France by the edict, it maintained several privileges. Among these were:

- It did not pay a tax on salt.
- Soldiers from the province were not allowed to be sent outside of Brittany.
- Its general tax rate was lower than in the rest of France.

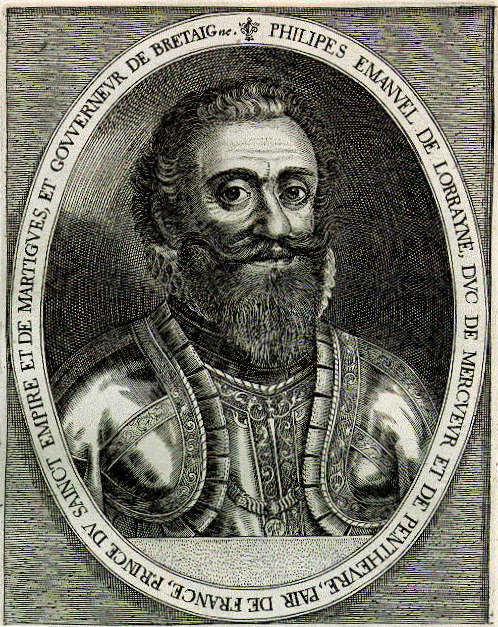
Philippe Emmanuel attempted to establish an autonomous principality in Brittany.

When Henry III (the last direct male descendant of Claude of France) died, Brittany passed as part of the Crown lands to the next heir of France, Henry of Navarre, rather than to Claude's most senior heirs (either Henry II, Duke of Lorraine or Infanta Isabella Clara Eugenia). While these nobles were technically Henry's heirs, there were problems with both claimants to the ducal crown. The most important issue was that the crown, as a Sovereign Duke, could not be separated from that of the French Crown. Meanwhile, the French Crown and the Spanish Crown had been permanently separated, beginning with the reign of Philip of Spain.

In 1582, Henry III of France, last living male-line grandson of Claude, Duchess of Brittany, made Philippe Emmanuel, Duke of Mercœur, his brother-in-law and a leader of Catholic League, governor of Brittany. Invoking the hereditary rights of his wife Marie de Luxembourg, he endeavoured to make himself independent in that province from 1589 onward, and organized a government at Nantes, proclaiming their young son Philippe Emmanuel "prince and duke of Brittany". (Note: Infanta Isabella was the eldest daughter of the eldest sister of Henry III, but being female weakened her status, and her position as Infanta effectively blocked any claim to the Breton Duchy.) Through maternal ancestry he was the direct primogenitural heir of Duchess Joan, of the House of Penthièvre, wife of Charles of Blois. Mercœur organized a government at Nantes, supported by the Spaniards. He prevented Henry IV's attempts to subjugate Brittany until 20 March 1598, when Mercœur was forced to surrender. Henry IV then had one of his own illegitimate sons marry the young daughter of the Mercœurs, and thereby assured direct French control of the province. Mercœur subsequently went in exile to the Kingdom of Hungary.

The title "Duke of Brittany" largely ceased to be used as a title of the King of France. When it appeared, the title was bestowed by the king of France to one of his direct descendants, and it was in any event titular in status.

== 17th and 18th centuries ==
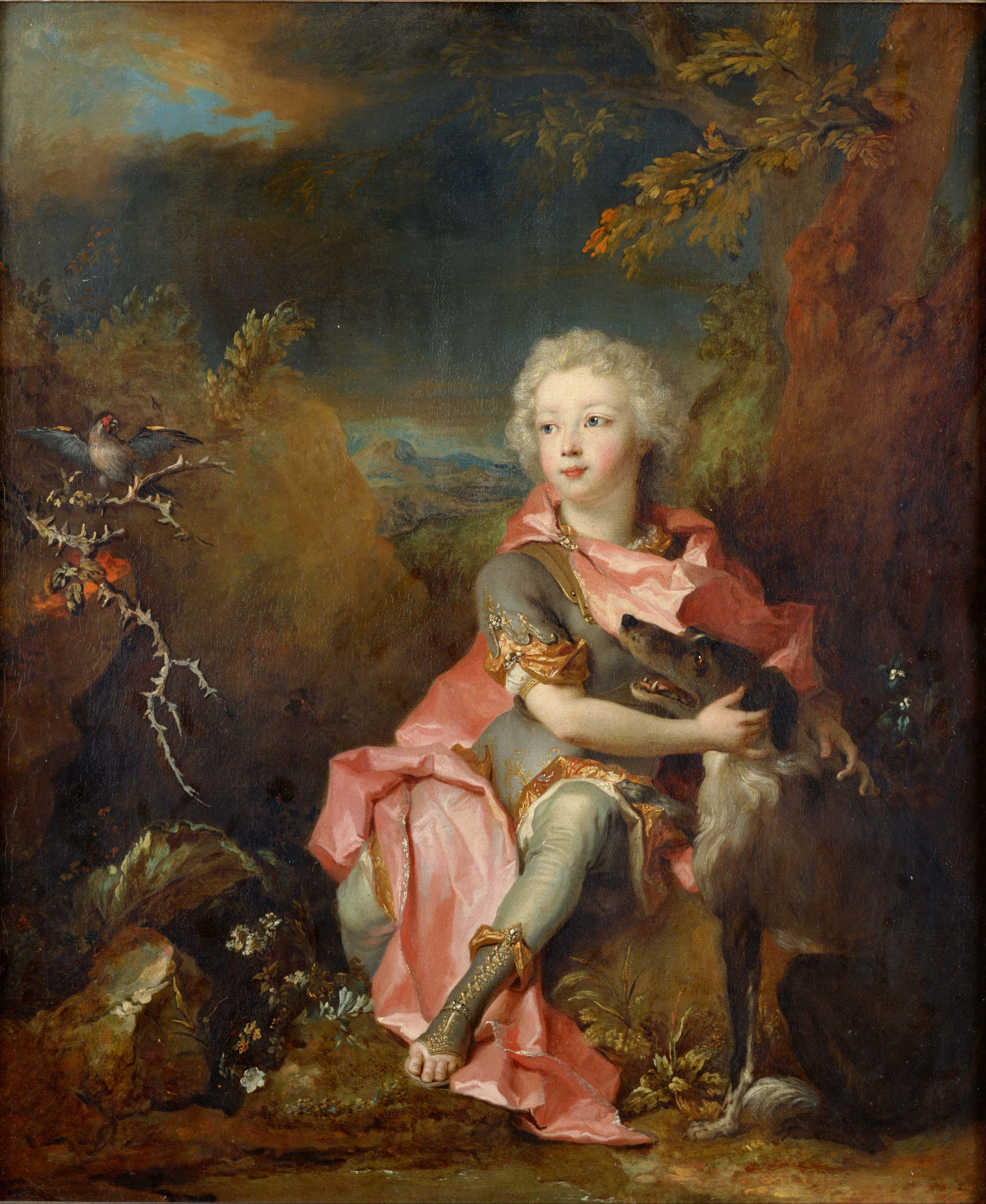
Louis, the last Duke of Brittany

Under the kings of France, the nobles of the Province of Brittany continued to enjoy the privileges that had been accorded them by the various independent dukes of Brittany. Brittany's Celtic legal traditions were maintained, to a degree, and the Estates of Brittany and the Parlement of Rennes were kept separate from the French parliamentary system in Paris. The Breton noble privileges protected in this parliamentary system included exemption from taxes, representation in the Breton Parlement, and the maintenance of Breton titles in the tradition of the Duchy rather than that of France: including, in theory, the application of Brittany's form of semi-Salic, rather than pure Salic Law to the succession.

Initially after the creation of the Province of Brittany the place continued to have a prosperous trade. This changed shortly after Jean-Baptiste Colbert became the head of finances for France. He instituted a ban on exports of some of the products whose export was the backbone of the economy of the province of Brittany. This especially heavily hit Locronan. These actions led to what was known as the Bonnet Rouge revolt in 1675. It was suppressed. The name was used again by tax protesters in Brittany in 2013 (see Bonnets Rouges).

After Henry II, the title Duke of Brittany was not used for over 200 years. It reappeared when a great-grandson of Louis XIV was named Louis, Duke of Brittany; He was the last holder of the title before the French Revolution and did not live to inherit the French throne. At his death the title in essence became defunct.

Claims on the titular ducal title by Spanish nobles at various times were not considered legitimate by the French, and its use by Louis XIV demonstrated that as the title had merged into the crown of France, only the king could assert the title himself or bestow it on another. Louis XIV's actions with regard to the ducal title also underscored the fact that the Spanish or cadet branch of the House of Bourbon had relinquished all French claims and inheritance rights as a condition of gaining the crown of Spain under the Treaty of Utrecht.

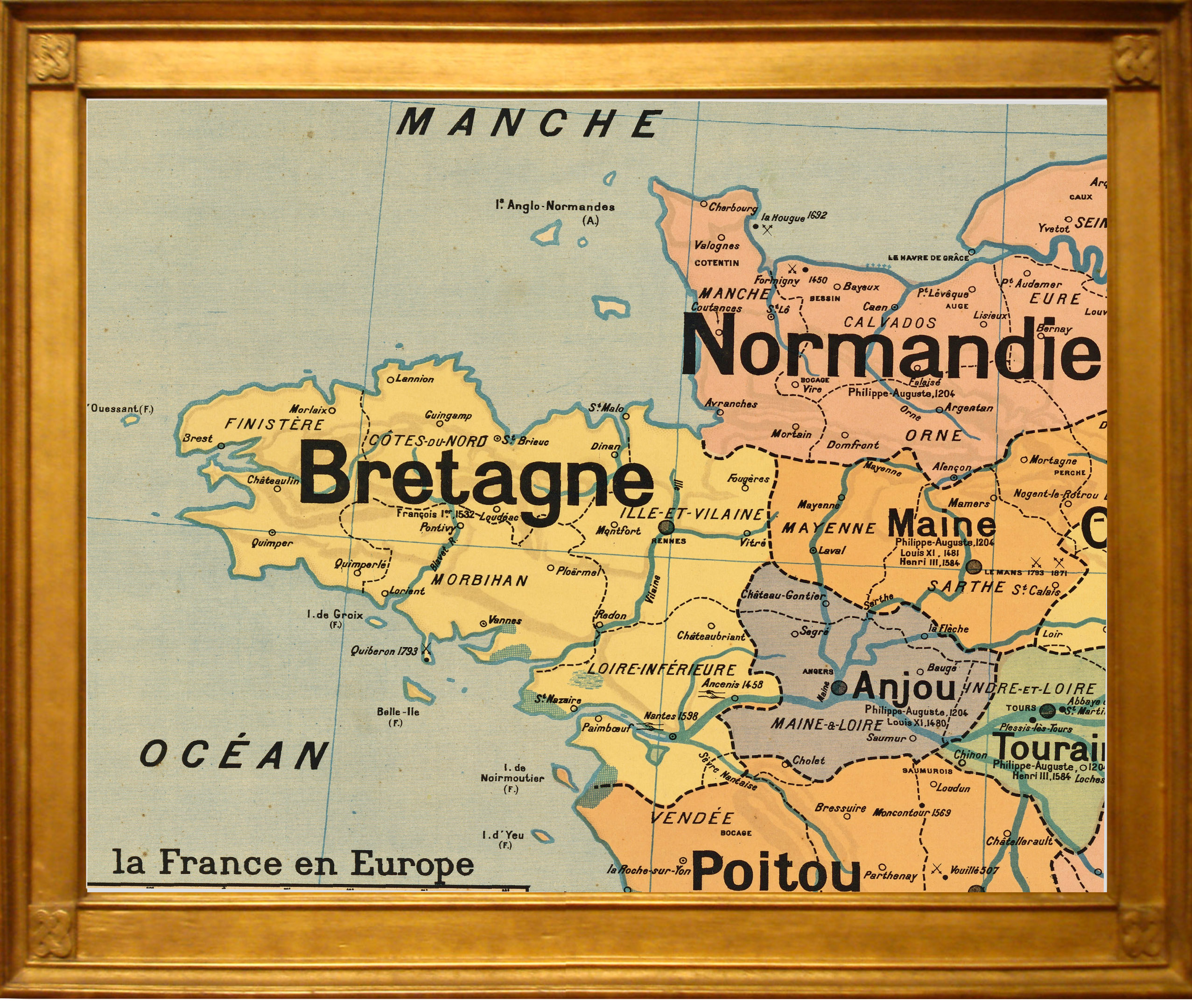
Province of Brittany (1789) – showing internal borders of five new departments: Côtes-du-Nord (now Côtes-d'Armor), Finistère, Ille-et-Vilaine, Loire-Inférieure (now Loire-Atlantique) and Morbihan.

Shortly before the French Revolution, the leaders of the Parlement of Rennes issued Remonstrances to Louis XVI, in part to remind the king of his duties as duke and to preserve the privileges of the Breton people under the Treaty of Union. The king's response was to dissolve the Breton Parlement. The Remonstrances were delivered to the king by members of the Breton Parlement led by the Comte de Saisy de Kerampuil and others.

Louis dissolved the Breton Parlement to strengthen his claims as an absolute monarch, for whom a representative parliament was unnecessary. He also aimed to advance a more centralized federal government but preserved Brittany's autonomy by recognizing the traditional privileges of its nobles, acting as the Duke of Brittany.

The Breton Parlement has not convened since then. During the French Revolution, the French National Assembly abolished Brittany's legal status. In 1790, the province was divided into five départements: Côtes-du-Nord (later Côtes-d'Armor), Finistère, Ille-et-Vilaine, Loire-Inférieure (later Loire-Atlantique), and Morbihan. As a result, Brittany lost the special privileges it had enjoyed under the Duchy. Three years later, the region became a center of royalist and Catholic resistance during the Chouannerie.
