= Marie of Luxembourg, Duchess of Penthièvre =

Marie of Luxembourg
- Duchess of Penthièvre; Duchess of Mercœur
- Born: 12 February 1562; Lamballe, Brittany, France
- Died: 6 September 1623 (aged 61); Château d'Anet, Eure-et-Loir, France
- Noble family: House of Luxembourg
- Spouse: Philippe Emmanuel, Duke of Mercœur
- Issue: Françoise de Lorraine, Duchess of Vendôme
- Father: Sébastien, Duke of Penthièvre
- Mother: Marie de Beaucaire

Marie of Luxembourg (February 12, 1562 – September 6, 1623), Duchess of Penthièvre from 1569 to 1623, Princess of Martigues, was the daughter of Sebastien de Luxembourg, Duke of Penthièvre and Marie de Beaucaire. She is an important figure in the history of the Duchy of Brittany; a distant descendant of Joan of Penthièvre, Duchess of Brittany and her husband Charles of Blois, Duke of Brittany, she aspired to restore the sovereignty of the duchy, and to ascend to the throne with her husband Philippe Emmanuel, Duke of Mercœur, brother-in-law of King Henry III and Governor of Brittany. The victory of Henry IV prevented her from carrying out her project.

== Life ==
Marie of Luxembourg was born on February 12, 1562, in Lamballe. Her name stems from the fact that she was an 11th generation descendant of Henry V, Count of Luxembourg, therefore belonging to the French branch of the Luxembourg House. After she was born, her father went to Scotland to ask Mary, Queen of Scots to be her godmother.

Her father died when she was seven years old, at which point she inherited the Duchy of Penthièvre. At the age of thirteen, she got married in Paris to the brother-in-law of King Henry III, Philippe-Emmanuel of Lorraine, Duke of Mercœur, of whom they had only one surviving daughter.

In 1582, Philippe Emmanuel was made Governor of Brittany by Henry III and put himself at the head of the Catholic League in Brittany, proclaiming himself to be protector of the Roman Catholic Church in the province in 1588. Invoking Marie's hereditary rights as a distant descendant of Joan of Penthièvre, Duchess of Brittany and Charles of Blois, Duke of Brittany, her and her husband aspired to restore the sovereignty of the duchy, organizing a government at Nantes and calling their son Louis (1589 - 1590) the 'prince and duke of Brittany'. They formed an alliance with Spain and continued to press for independence when Henry IV became King of France. The king, accompanied by his mistress Gabrielle d'Estrees, marched against Philippe Emmanuel, leading Marie of Luxembourg to approach d'Estrées at Angers and capitulate on behalf of her husband. Although the king did not confiscate their lands, their submission resulted in the betrothal of Françoise, their only child to survive infancy, to César de Bourbon, the illegitimate son of Henry IV and d'Estrées.

Marie's husband subsequently traveled to Hungary, entering the service of the Holy Roman Emperor Rudolph II and raising armies in the Holy League during the war against the Ottomans. Her husband died in 1602 in Nuremberg after falling ill while returning from battle, having defeated the Ottomans in the Siege of Székesfehérvár. Almost ruined by the countless expenses that had allowed her husband to raise armies in the Holy League, she refused offers of reconciliation with Henry IV, and could not return to Paris until the funeral of her sister-in-law, Queen Louise of Lorraine, in 1603.

After returning to Paris, she made multiple donations to religious orders, founding the Couvent des Capucines on the Rue du Faubourg Saint-Honoré following the last wishes of her sister-in-law Queen Louise (the nuns had to be relocated when Place Vendôme was created 80 years later); and the convents of the Feuillants, the Capuchins, and the Reformed Jacobins.

Her daughter, Françoise of Lorraine, eventually married César de Bourbon, now Duke of Vendôme, on July 7, 1609. Marie had opposed the marriage for a long time, saying she could not bring herself to confuse "her noble blood with that of a bastard, even if he was of royal blood", but the sums paid by Henry IV for her submission (4,295,350 livres) and the lack of support she found among her relatives undoubtedly overcame her resistance.

In 1615, Marie purchased the Château d'Anet from Marie of Lorraine, who was left ruined by her husband Charles, Duke of Aumale, the grandson of Diane de Poitiers, after he was exiled to Brussels following his conviction of treason by the Parlement. Marie of Lorraine, who was being harassed by her husband's creditors, was forced to sell the château to Marie of Luxembourg as Charles had borrowed a vast sum of money from her. Unable to pay back the money, Marie of Lorraine sold the château to Marie of Luxembourg for 400,000 livres. The acquisition was approved by the Parliament.

Marie of Luxembourg died on September 6, 1623, at the Château d'Anet.

== Marriage and children ==
Married on July 12, 1575, in Paris, to Philippe-Emmanuel de Lorraine, Duke of Mercœur, they had four children, three of whom died in infancy:

- François;
- Louis (1589 - 1590);
- Philippe;
- Françoise of Lorraine; married on July 7, 1609, in Fontainebleau to César de Bourbon, Duke of Vendôme and Etampes, illegitimate son of Henry IV.

French nobility
Preceded by Sébastien, Duke of Penthièvre	Comte de Penthièvre; 1569– 1623	Succeeded by Françoise de Lorraine, Duchess of Vendôme

== Bibliography ==
- Charles Bouvard, Description of the illness, death and life of the Duchess of Mercœur, who died in her castle of Anet on Sept. 1623., Paris, J. Libert, 1624.
- Hilarion de Coste, Le Dictionnaire des Femmes de l'Ancienne France, Siefar (read online), "Marie de Luxembourg (1562-1623)"
- ROCHARD Manuella, Advocacy for the family of Marie de Luxembourg, Proceedings of the symposium held on April 19, 1998, Archaeological and Historical Society of Nantes and Loire-Atlantique, Nantes, 1999, special issue.
- LE GOFF Hervé, The League in Brittany, Rennes, 2010.

== See also ==
- Duchy of Brittany
- List of rulers of Brittany
