= Christophe Bonduelle =

French heir and businessman

- Born: December 14, 1959 (age 66); Renescure, Nord-Pas-de-Calais (now Hauts-de-France), France
- Education: EDHEC Business School
- Spouse: Isabelle Simon
- Children: 4
- Parent(s): Félix Bonduelle; Bernadette Lemesre

Christophe Bonduelle (born December 14, 1959) is a French heir and businessman. He serves as the chairman and chief executive officer of Bonduelle.

== Early life ==
Christophe Bonduelle was born on December 14, 1959, in Renescure, France. His father, Félix Bonduelle, was a Commercial Director of Bonduelle. His mother was Bernadette Lemesre. He has two brothers, Benoit and Marc, and two sisters, Veronique and Charlotte. Louis Bonduelle-Dalle, his paternal great-great-grandfather, co-founded Bonduelle with Louis Lesaffre-Roussel in 1853.

Bonduelle graduated from the EDHEC Business School in 1982.

== Career ==
Bonduelle started his business career Map Conseils, followed by the Imprimerie Hemmerlé.

Bonduelle joined the family business, Bonduelle, in 1985. He was the manager of its factory in Beauvais. He later opened branches in Spain and Portugal. He has served as its chairman since 2001 and as its chief executive officer since 2005. He established the Louis Bonduelle Foundation to promote the consumption of vegetables in 2005. Five years later, in 2010, he opened a new factory in Brazil.

Bonduelle has served on the board of directors of the Association Nationale des Industries Alimentaires (ANIA) since 2005. He was the 2011 recipient of the "Chaptal 2011 de l'industrie" award from the Société d'Encouragement pour l'Industrie Nationale.

In 2009, he had an estimated wealth of Euro 261 million.

== Personal life ==
Bonduelle is married to Isabelle Simon. They have four children.
