= Brosse =

Brosse or Brossé is a French family name. Notable people with the name include:

- Anthony Brosse (born 1980), French politician
- Charles-Léonce Brossé (1871–), French painter, engraver and lithographer
- Jean-Patrice Brosse (born 1950), French classical violinist
- Dirk Brossé (born 1960), Belgian conductor and composer
- Stéphane Brosse (1971–2012), French ski mountaineer

== See also ==
- DeBrosse
- Bross
