= Bonduel =

Bonduel may refer to:

- Frans Bonduel (1907-1998), a Belgian bicycle racer
- Bonduel, Wisconsin

== See also ==
- Bonduelle
