= Brossard (disambiguation) =

Brossard is a suburb of Montreal, Quebec, Canada.

Brossard may also refer to:

- Brossard (surname)
  - Sébastien de Brossard, French composer
- Brossard station, a REM station in Brossard
- Brossard—La Prairie, Canadian federal electoral district
- Brossard-Mopin, French construction company active in the Far East from 1890s to 1940s.
