= Anne de Pisseleu d'Heilly =

French duchess (1508–1580)

- Duchess of Étampes
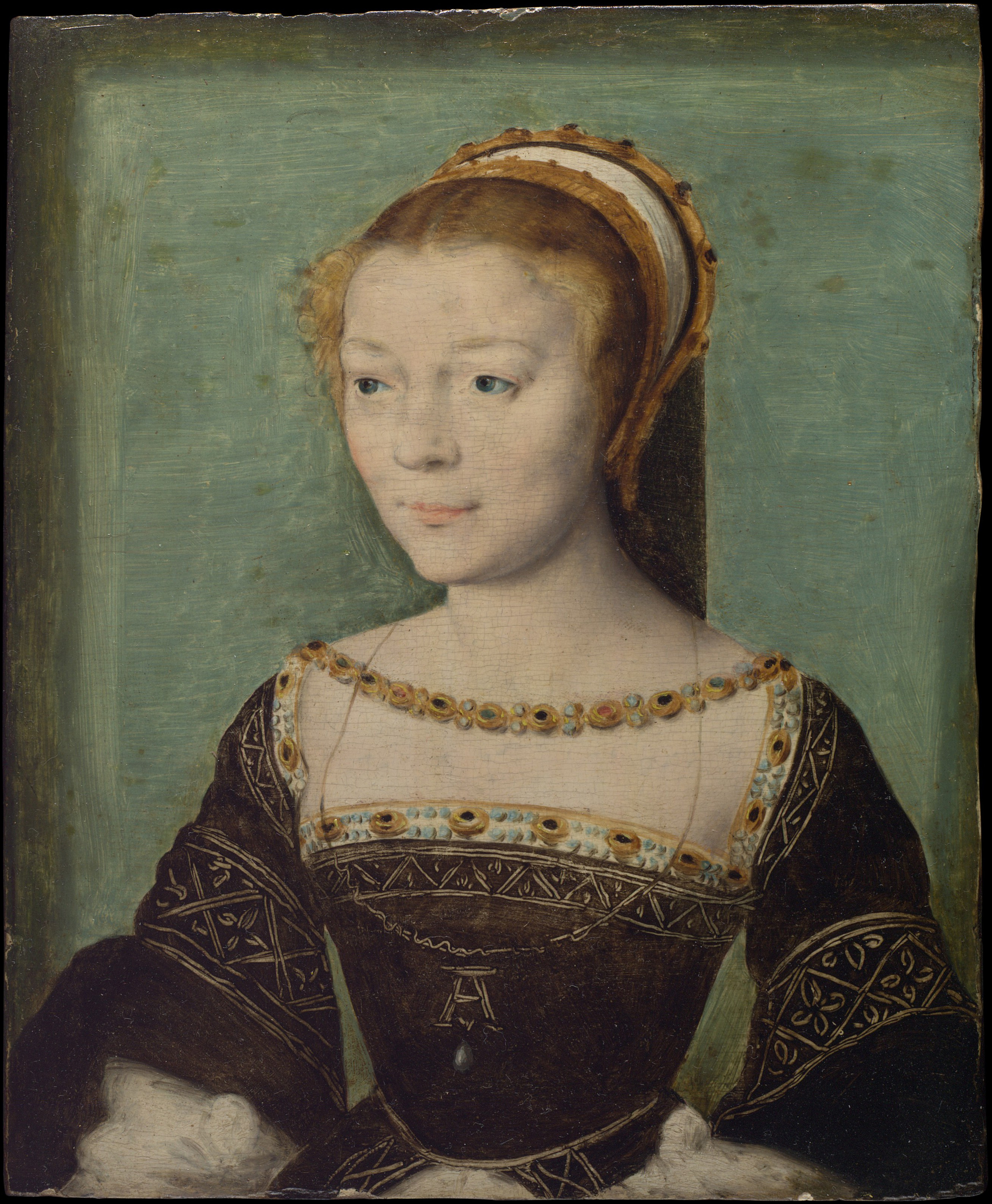
- Portrait of Anne attributed to Corneille de Lyon, c. 1535–40
- Born: 1508
- Died: 1580 (aged 71–72)
- Noble family: Pisseleu d'Heilly (by birth); Brosse (by marriage)
- Spouse: Jean IV de Brosse
- Father: Guillaume de Pisseleu, seigneur d'Heilly
- Mother: Anne Sanguin

Anne de Pisseleu d'Heilly (French pronunciation: [an də pislø dɛji]), Duchess of Étampes, (1508–1580) was chief mistress of King Francis I of France. She became Francis' mistress following his return from captivity in 1526. Anne enriched her family and friends through her courtly influence and after Francis' death was banished from court and temporarily imprisoned in her husband's castle. She spent her later years ensuring the fortune of her family.

== King's mistress ==
Born in 1508, Anne was the daughter of Guillaume de Pisseleu, seigneur d'Heilly, a nobleman of Picardy, and Anne Sanguin. She came to court before 1522 and was one of the maids-of-honour of Marie of Luxembourg and later Louise of Savoy, the mother of King Francis I of France. Francis made Anne his mistress, probably upon his return from his captivity at Madrid (1526), and soon gave up his long-term mistress, Françoise de Foix, for her.

Anne was described as being sprightly, pretty, witty and cultured, "the most beautiful among the learned and the most learned among the beautiful". The liaison received some official recognition when Francis started wearing Anne's colors. Anne was appointed lady-in-waiting to the new queen, Eleanor of Austria, and later became governess to Francis's two daughters. She used her influence with Francis to elevate and enrich her family; her brother, Adrien sieur d'Heilly, was made captain of the Picard legion, her uncle, Antoine Sanguin, being made Bishop of Orléans in 1533 and a cardinal in 1539; her three other brothers were made bishops. In 1534, Francis gave her in marriage to Jean IV de Brosse, whom he created Duke of Étampes.

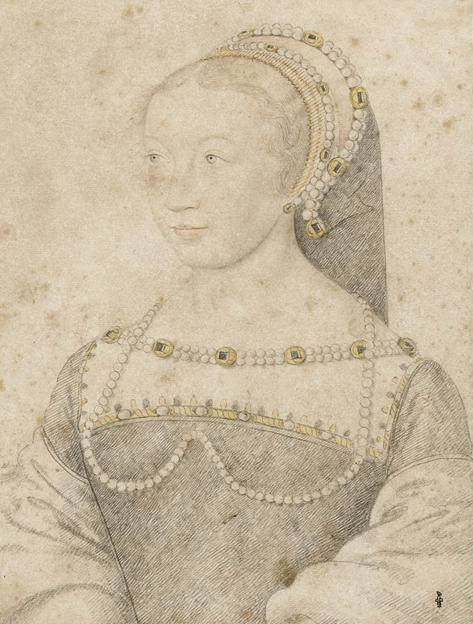
Sketch of Anne by François Clouet.

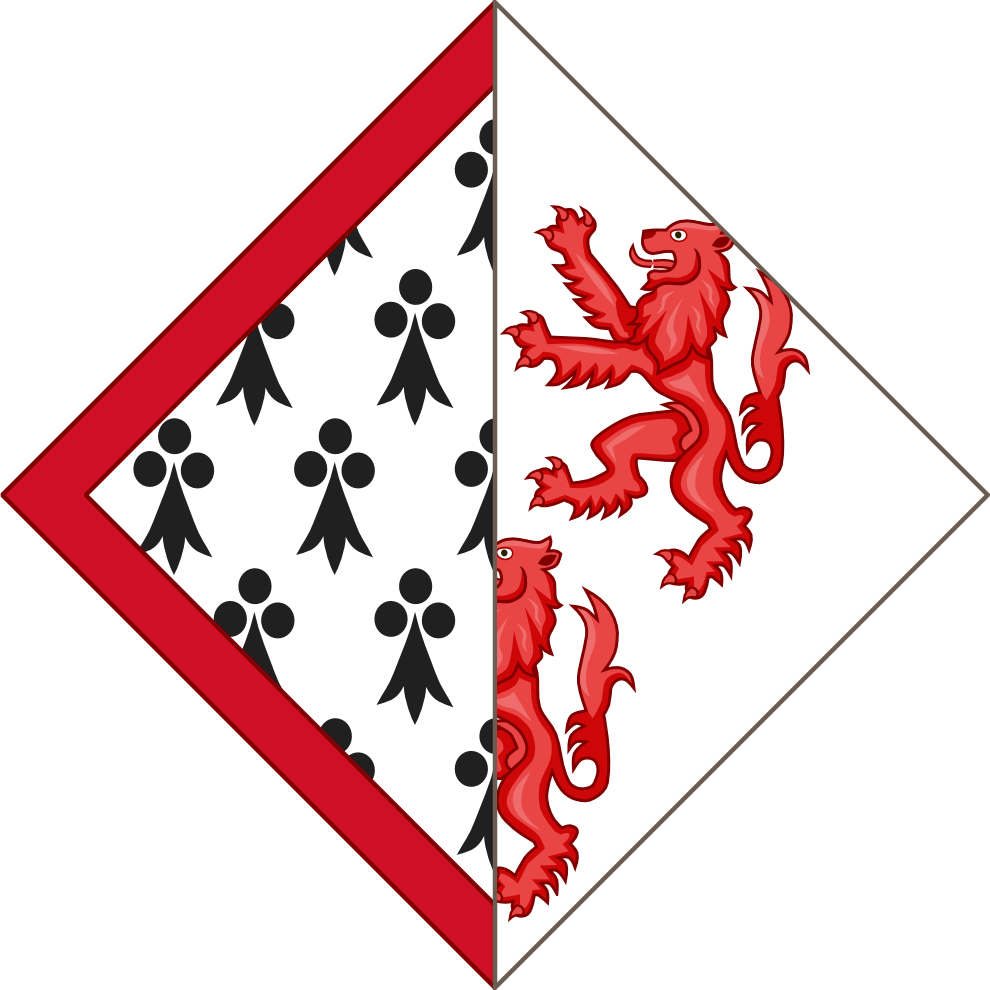
Her coat of arms

== Court influence ==
With the political fall of the Duke of Montmorency in 1540, Anne became all-powerful at court. Surrounded by those seeking royal favor, she dominated court functions. Foreign diplomats quickly learned they had to gain Anne's favor for their plans to have any chance in succeeding. In doing so, she usurped Queen Eleanor's position at court. Anne later illustrated her political influence by having Admiral Chabot released and returned to court, marrying her sister Louise to Chabot's nephew in the process.

Despite her capabilities, Anne was of a fickle nature. In 1545, she tried to discredit Admiral d'Annebault, despite him owing his advancement to her. When her intrigues were discouraged by Archbishop Tournon, Anne attempted to bring about his fall on a charge of dishonesty.

The influence of Anne, especially in the last years of Francis' reign, continued to grow. A staunch Protestant, she counseled Francis on toleration for Huguenots. By October 1546, Anne, along with Cardinal du Bellay, was pressuring Francis to break with Rome. Due to her influence Francis was attending more council meetings, and according to an imperial envoy, Anne was "the real president of the king's most private and intimate council".

Basking in her success at bringing peace between Francis and Charles at Crepy in 1544, Anne convinced Francis that his son the Dauphin Henry and Diane de Poitiers were working to reinstate Montmorency at court. Francis, so instructed, banished Diane from court. In response, Henry and his supporters retreated to the chateau of Anet; father and son would not reconcile until 1545.

== Loss of position ==
Despite having influence at Francis' court, Anne had made many enemies: Henry, his mistress, Diane de Poitiers, and Anne de Montmorency were among them. Following Francis' death in March 1547, Henry, now king, had Anne dismissed from the court and confiscated her possessions. By 1548, Anne was facing the threat of trial for heresy. Henry chose not to pursue this possibly out of respect for his father. Her husband accused her of theft of his governorship salary and disgracing his family, and had Anne confined temporarily to the castle of La Hardoinaye.

Anne was still a wealthy woman, having properties in Paris and a capital of 47,615 livres in rentes. By 1554-55 she was maintaining her niece Jossine de Pisseleu's rights to the Lenoncourt succession from the Guise family. In March 1560, she gave 114,000 livres to her niece, Diane de Barbançon, for her marriage to Jean de Rohan, baron de Frontenay. Anne gave 30,000 livres for her nephew Jean d'Heilly's first marriage, and acted as the intermediary for Jean's second marriage, writing to the lady's ward. She continued to be involved in the lives of her nieces and nephews into her later years.

Anne died in 1580.

== Sources ==
- Crawford, Katherine (2010). The Sexual Culture of the French Renaissance. Cambridge University Press. ISBN 978-0-521-76989-1.
- Knecht, R.J. (1982). Francis I. Cambridge University Press. ISBN 0-521-24344-0.
- Knecht, R.J. (1994). Renaissance Warrior and Patron: The Reign of Francis I. Cambridge University Press. ISBN 0-521-57885-X.
- La Fayette, Madame de (1950). Magne, Emile (ed.). La Princesse de Clèves (in French). Librairie E. Droz.
- Potter, David (1990). "Marriage and Cruelty among the Protestant Nobility in Sixteenth-Century France: Diane de Barbançon and Jean de Rohan, 1561-7". European History Quarterly. 20 issue: January 1: 5–38. doi:10.1177/026569149002000101. S2CID 144245625.
- Potter, David (1993). War and Government in the French Provinces. Cambridge University Press. ISBN 0-521-43189-1.
- Potter, David (2007). "Politics and Faction at the Court of Francis I: The Duchesse D'Etampes, Montmorency and the Dauphin Henri". French History. 21, Issue 2, Jun (2). Oxford University Press: 127–146. doi:10.1093/fh/crm005.
- Wellman, Kathleen (2013). Queens and Mistresses of Renaissance France. Yale University Press. ISBN 978-0-300-17885-2.
