= Château de Zuthove =

Manor in Renescure, France

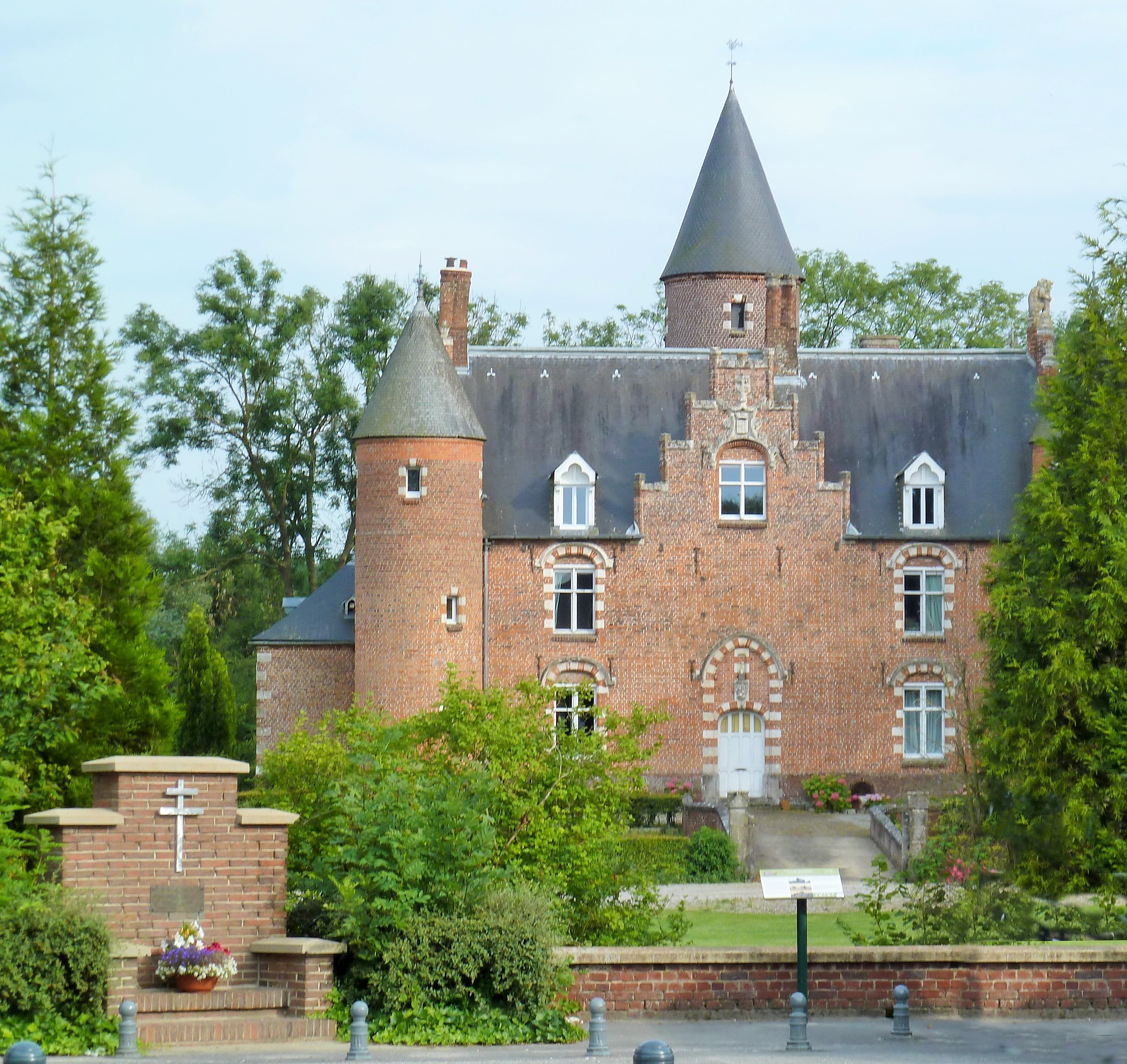

- Location within France

General information
- Coordinates: 50°43′37″N 2°22′17″E

The Château de Zuthove is a historic manor in Renescure, Nord, France.

It was built in 1472. It has been listed as an official monument since 1946.
