= Philippe de Commines =

Belgian writer, historian and diplomat

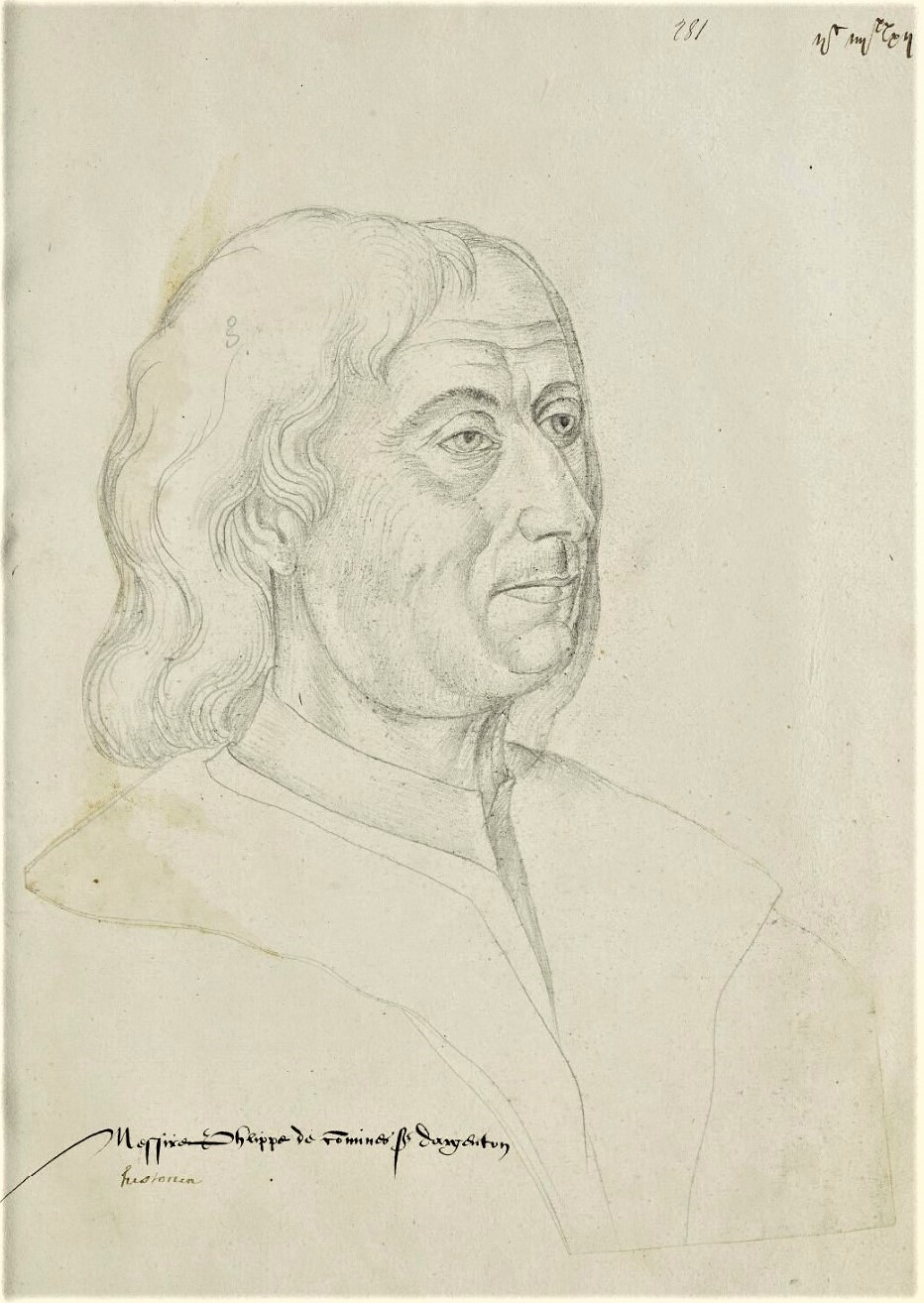
- Born: 1447; Renescure, Flanders
- Died: c. 1511; Argenton-les-Vallées, Poitou
- Occupations: writer, diplomat, politician

Philippe de Commines (also Commynes or Comines; Latin: Philippus Cominaeus; 1447 – 18 October 1511) was a writer and diplomat in the courts of Burgundy and France. He has been called "the first truly modern writer" (Charles Augustin Sainte-Beuve) and "the first critical and philosophical historian since classical times" (Oxford Companion to English Literature). Neither a chronicler nor a historian in the usual sense of the word, his analyses of the contemporary political scene are what made him virtually unique in his own time.

== Biography ==
=== Early life ===
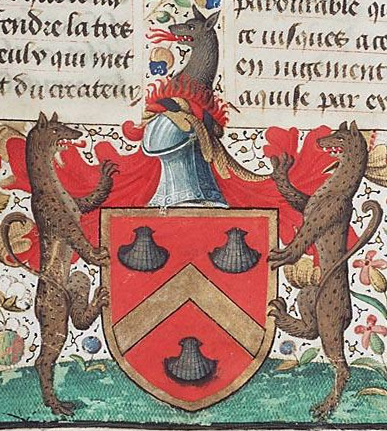
Coat of arms of Philippe de Commines

Commines was born at Renescure (in what was then the county of Flanders), to an outwardly wealthy family. His parents were Colard van den Clyte (or de La Clyte) and Marguerite d'Armuyden. In addition to being seigneur of Renescure, Watten and Saint-Venant, Clyte became bailiff of Flanders for the Duke of Burgundy in 1436, and had been taken prisoner at the Battle of Agincourt in 1415. Philippe took his surname from a seigneurie on the river Lys which had belonged to the family of his paternal grandmother, Jeanne de Waziers. His paternal grandfather, also named Colard van den Clyte (d. 1404), had been governor first of Cassel and then of Lille. However, the death of Commines' father in 1453 left him the orphaned owner of an estate saddled with enormous debts. In his teens he was taken into the care of Philip the Good (1419–1467), Duke of Burgundy, who was his godfather. He fought at the Battle of Montlhéry in 1465 and the Battle of Brusthem in 1467 but in general seems to have kept a low profile.

=== Burgundy ===
In 1468, he became a knight in the household of Charles the Bold, Philip's son who succeeded to the dukedom in 1467, and thereafter he moved in the most exalted circles, being party to many important decisions and present at history-making events. A key event in Commines's life seems to have been the meeting between Charles and Louis XI of France at Péronne in October 1468. Although Commines's own account skates over the details, it is apparent from other contemporary sources that Louis believed Commines had saved his life. This may explain Louis's later enthusiasm in wooing him away from the Burgundians.

In 1470 Commines was sent on an embassy to Calais, then an English possession. It is unlikely that he ever visited England itself, what he knew of its politics and personalities coming mostly from meetings with exiles, both Yorkist and Lancastrian; these included Henry Tudor and Warwick the Kingmaker. He also met King Edward IV during the latter's continental exile and later wrote a description of his appearance and character. Like other Burgundians (Georges Chastellain, Olivier de la Marche), he mentions that King Edward was most beautiful, that he was very popular with his people and his subjects, but that he does not doubt at all (before the exile, Edward never heard any of Duke Charles's and his people's warnings). Commines praises Edward's best friend William Hastings as "le plus grand chevalier", "un sage chevalier", while he overly attacks Richard III as a murderer of princes and "cruel". (In addition, according to Commines and rumours in Burgundy, Richard killed King Henry VI.) But unlike Olivier de la Marche, Commines mentions that Edward was a bastard and his real father was Blayborne (in French, Blayborgne), and that Henry Tudor was not eligible to claim the throne.

Commines was a great favorite with Duke Charles of Burgundy for seven years (going back to when he had still been Count of Charolais). The 19th-century scholar Isaac D'Israeli, recounts that one day, when they came home from hunting and were joking around as was their wont within the "family", Commines "ordered" the prince to remove Commines's boots as if he were a servant; laughing, the prince did so but then tossed the boot at Commines, and it bloodied his nose. Everyone in the Burgundian court started calling Commines "booted head". D'Israeli, in his 1824 Curiosities of Literature, suggests that Commines's hatred for the duke of Burgundy poisoned everything he wrote about him, but comments:

When we are versed in the history of the times, we often discover that memoir-writers have some secret poison in their hearts. Many, like Comines, have had the boot dashed on their nose. Personal rancour wonderfully enlivens the style... Memoirs are often dictated by its fiercest spirit; and then histories are composed from memoirs. Where is TRUTH? Not always in histories and memoirs!

=== Service of Louis XI ===
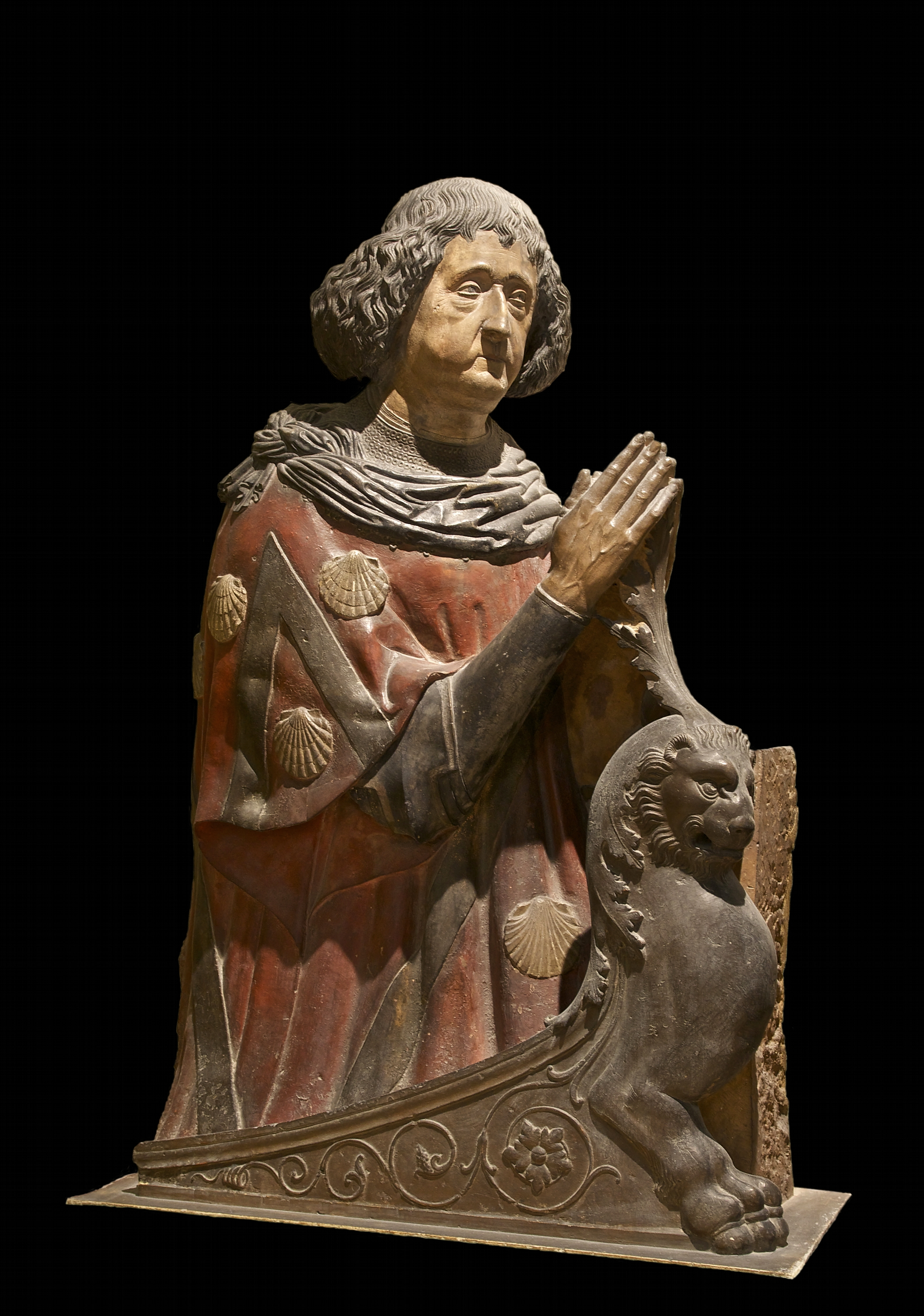
Commines at prayer

D'Israeli says Commines so resented his nickname that it was the reason he suddenly left Burgundy and went into the service of the French king, but the financial incentives offered by Louis provide a more than adequate explanation: Commines was still heavily burdened with his father's debts. He fled by night from Normandy on 7 August 1472, and joined Louis near Angers. On the following morning, when Duke Charles discovered his servant and god-brother missing, he confiscated all of Commines's property. These were later given to Philip I of Croÿ-Chimay.

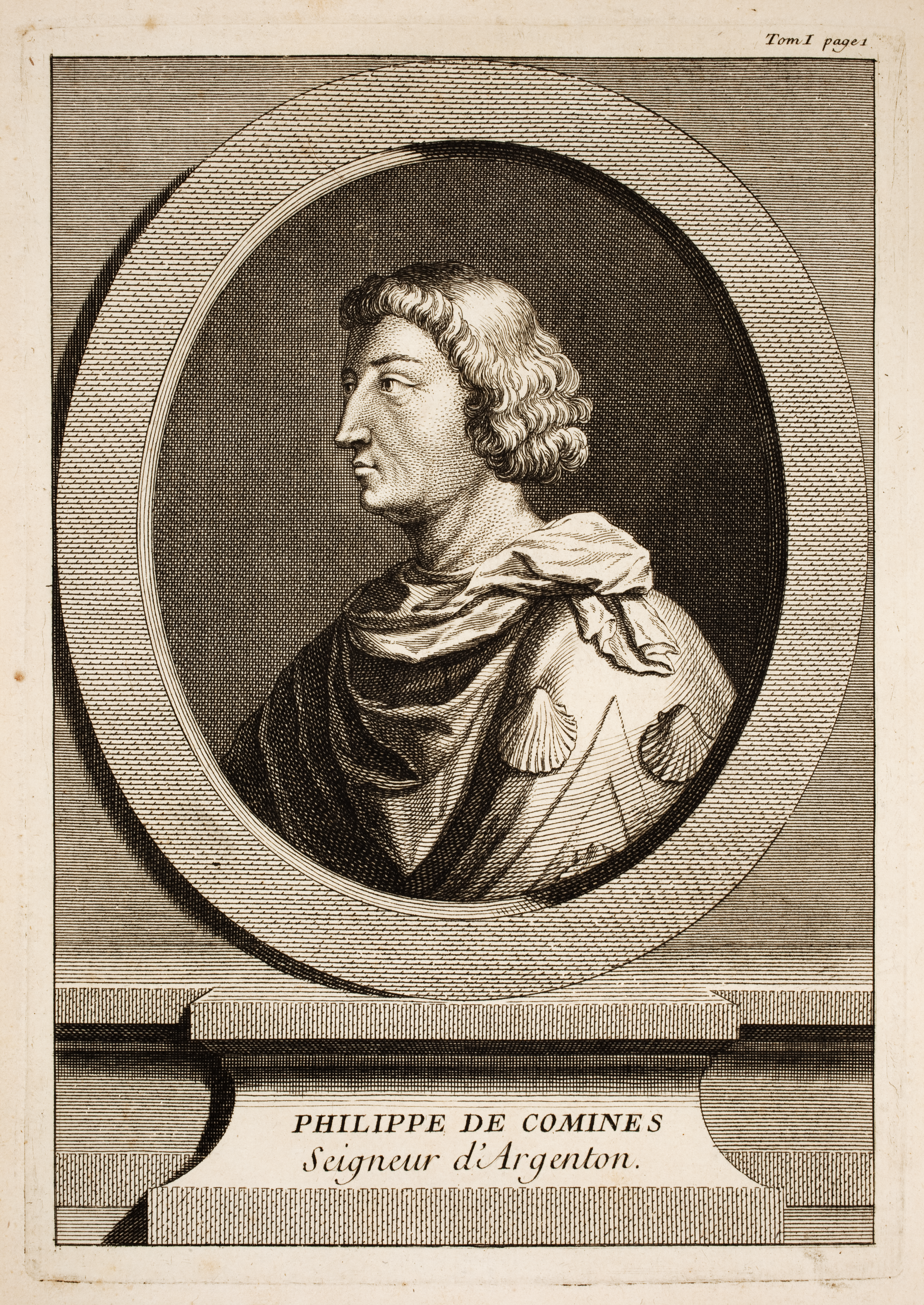
Engraving of Philippe de Commines

Louis was generous in making up for those losses. On 27 January 1473 the king wed him to a Poitevin heiress, Hélène de Chambes (d.1532), dame of the seigneuries of Argenton, Varennes, and Maison-Rouge. When Hélène's sister, Colette de Chambes, was believed to have been poisoned by her aged husband Louis d'Amboise, Viscount of Thouars, in a fit of jealousy over her affair with Charles de Valois, Louis XI's brother, the king had confiscated most of his properties. Some of these he later gave to Commines for life, including the Princedom of Talmond in Poitou, and the seigneuries of Berrie, Sables, and Olonne. Despite later reverses in the family's fortunes, on 13 August 1504 their only child, Jeanne de Commines (d. 1513), made a splendid marriage to the heir of Brittany's most powerful family, René de Brosse comte de Penthièvre (d. 1524).

As a long-time enemy of Burgundy, Louis no doubt valued the inside information Commines was able to provide, and Commines quickly became one of the king's most trusted advisers. Jean Dufournet's 1966 study of Commines has shown that the next five years, up to 1477, were the most prosperous from Commines's point of view, and the only ones when he truly had Louis's confidence. After Charles the Bold's death in 1477, the two men openly disagreed about how best to take political advantage of the situation. Commines himself admitted associating with some of the king's most prominent opponents and referred to another incident, in May 1478, when Louis reprimanded him for allegedly being open to bribery. Thereafter, much of his diplomatic work was done in the Italian arena, and he came into contact with Lorenzo de Medici on several occasions.

When Louis began to suffer ill-health, Commines was apparently welcomed back into the fold and performed personal services for the king. Many of his activities during the period seem to have involved a degree of secrecy; he was effectively acting as a kind of undercover agent. However, he never regained the level of intimacy with the king that he had previously enjoyed, and Louis's death in 1483, when Commines was still only in his thirties, left him without many friends at court. Nevertheless, he retained a place on the royal council until 1485. Then, having been implicated in the Orleanist rebellion, he was taken prisoner and kept in confinement for over two years, from January 1487 until March 1489. For some of that period, he was kept in an iron cage.

=== Mémoires ===
After his release, Commines was exiled to his estate at Dreux, where he began to write his Mémoires. (This title was not used until an edition of 1552.) By 1490, however, he was recovering his position at court and was in the service of King Charles VIII of France. Charles never allowed him the privileged position he had held under Louis, and he was once again used as an envoy to the Italian states. However, his personal affairs were still problematic, and his right to some of the possessions given him by Louis was subject to legal challenges.

In 1498 (fifteen years after the death of Louis XI), Commines's work was completed (first published in 1524 in Paris), and is considered a historical record of immense importance, largely because of its author's cynical and forthright attitude to the events and machinations he had witnessed. His writings reveal many of the less savoury aspects of the reign of Louis XI, and Commines related them without apology, insisting that the late king's virtues outweighed his vices. He is regarded as a major primary source for 15th-century European history.

The Mémoires are divided into "books", the first six of which were written between 1488 and 1494, and relate the course of events from the beginning of Commines's career (1464) up to the death of King Louis. The remaining two books were written between 1497 and 1501 (printed in 1528), and deal with the Italian wars, ending in the death of King Charles VIII of France.

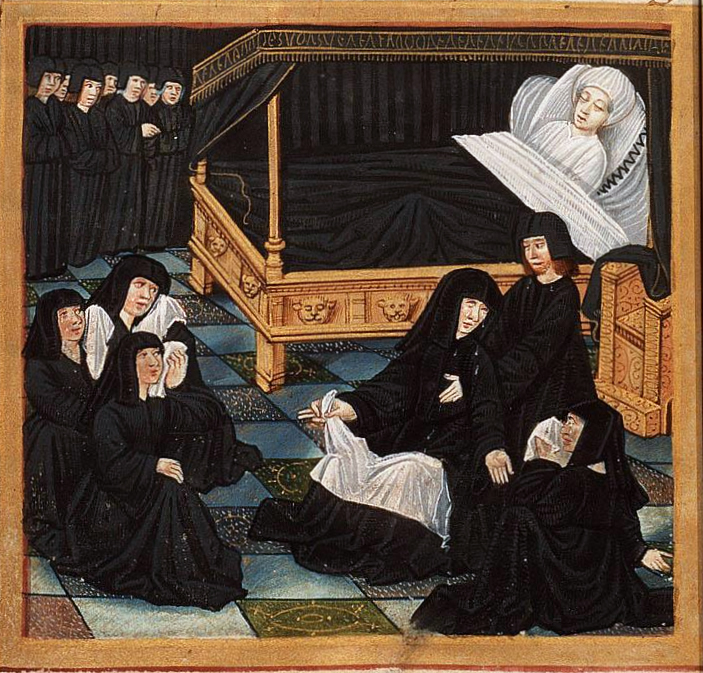
The deathbed of Philippe de Commines

Commines's scepticism is summed up in his own words: Car ceux qui gagnent en ont toujours l'honneur ("For the honours always go to the winners"). Some have disputed whether his candid phrases disguise a deeper dishonesty. Yet at no time does he attempt to present himself as a hero, even when recounting his military career. His attitude to politics is one of pragmatism, and his ideas are practical and progressive. His reflections on the events he has witnessed are profound by comparison with those of Froissart, who lived a century earlier. His psychological insights into the behaviour of kings are ahead of their time, reminiscent in some ways of the contemporaneous writings of Niccolò Machiavelli. Like Machiavelli, Commines aims to instruct the reader in statecraft, though from a slightly different viewpoint. In particular, he notes how Louis repeatedly got the better of the English, not by military might, but by political machination.
