= Antoine Sanguin =

Catholic cardinal

His Eminence Antoine Sanguin
- Cardinal-Priest
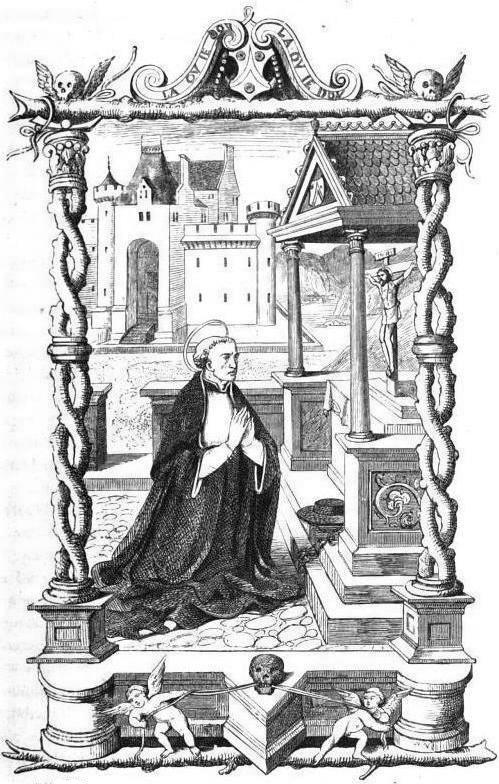
- Church: S. Maria in Portico; San Crisogono
- Diocese: Orléans (1533-1550); Toulouse (1550/1553-1559)
- Other post: Grand Aumonier of France

Orders
- Created cardinal: 19 December 1539 by Pope Paul III

Personal details
- Born: 1493 Paris, France
- Died: 25 November 1559 (aged 65–66)
- Parents: Antoine Sanguin; Marie Simon
- Occupation: courtier

Antoine Sanguin (1493 – 25 November 1559) was a French cleric, courtier and cardinal. He was the second son of Antoine Sanguin, Seigneur de Meudon and Maître des Eaux-Forêts de l'Isle de France, Champagne et Brie; and Marie Simon, daughter of Jean Simon, Seigneur de Marquemont. The younger Antoine had a brother and three sisters; his sister Anne was married to Guillaume de Pisseleu. He was therefore the uncle of Anne de Pisseleu d'Heilly, mistress of François I, to whom he owed his ecclesiastical career; there is no record of his having taken holy orders.

== Early career ==
He was named fourth Abbot Commendatory of the abbey of Fleury-sur-Loire by King Francis I in 1535, a benefice which he held until 1551. He resigned the abbey to Cardinal Odet de Châtillon in exchange for the Diocese of Tours. In 1534 his brother Jean was appointed Lieutenant-General of the City of Paris.

He was appointed Bishop of Orléans by King Francis I of France, and the promotion was approved by Pope Clement VII on 6 November 1533. Shortly thereafter he was named Master of the Royal Chapel (Maître de l'Oratoire) of Francis I, a post he held until his promotion to Grand Almoner in 1543.

== Cardinal Sanguin de Meudon ==
He was made a cardinal in the consistory of 19 December 1539, by Pope Paul III. The King (and no doubt Mme. d'Estampes) had been extremely annoyed when Sanguin had not been named a cardinal in the Consistory of 20 December 1538, as they had expected. He was assigned the Deaconry of Santa Maria in Portico on 15 July 1541, which was temporarily (pro hac vice) promoted to the rank of titular church. His red hat was sent to him in France, and was presented to him by the Papal Legate, Cardinal Alessandro Farnese in a ceremony held in Notre Dame de Paris on Pentecost, 1540. Sanguin first presented himself in Rome for his introduction into the Roman Curia on 20 December 1547, and was received by the Pope on 22 December. He was presented with his ring on 9 January 1548 and granted the right to speak in Consistory.

He was named Grand Aumonier of France on 7 August 1543, in succession to Cardinal Jean Le Veneur, who had died on the same day.

In 1544 Cardinal Sanguin's niece's brother, Charles Pisseleu, who had been Administrator of the diocese of Mende since 1538, was made Bishop of Condom, thanks to the patronage of King Francis' sister, Marguerite of Navarre. The appointment was approved by Pope Paul III on 15 June 1545. In 1546 Bishop Charles' half-brother, François Pisseleu, a nephew of the Cardinal, was named Bishop of Amiens (He resigned in 1552).

Cardinal Sanguin was made Lieutenant-General of Paris in 1544, the post his brother had held, to defend the city against the threats of Charles V, Holy Roman Emperor, in which capacity he was among the delegates charged with negotiating the peace with the Emperor. He served as hostage, guaranteeing the peace which was concluded.

== In disfavor ==
At the death of King Francis in 1547, Sanguin's position at Court was compromised, as were those of all of the favorites of the late King's mistress, the Duchess d'Étampes. He resigned his post of Almoner and retired to Italy. He arrived in Rome on 20 December 1547, his first visit to the city. In Rome he participated in the conclave of 1549-50. The two cardinals who were competing the most vigorously, Reginald Pole and Gian Pietro Carafa, cancelled each other out week after week, scrutiny after scrutiny. Finally on February 7, 1550, in the evening, Cardinal Giovanni Maria Ciocchi del Monte was elected Pope Julius III.

In 1550 Cardinal Sanguin was rehabilitated, returned to France, and, on 20 October 1550 was appointed Archbishop of Toulouse by the new King, Henri II. He did not receive his bulls of appointment from Pope Julius III, however, until 22 October 1553.

Cardinal Antoine Sanguin de Meudon died in Paris on 25 November 1559. He was buried in the church of Sainte-Catherine-du-Val-des-Écoliers in the Marais district, in the Chapel of the Virgin.

== Bibliography ==
- Cardella, Lorenzo (1793). Memorie storiche de cardinali della Santa romana chiesa ... (in Italian). Rome: Pagliarini. pp. 221–222.
- Gulik, Guilelmus van; Konrad Eubel (1923). L. Schmitz-Kallenberg (ed.). Hierarchia catholica medii aevi (in Latin). Vol. III (editio altera ed.). Münster: sumptibus et typis librariae Regensbergianae.
- Lebeuf, Jean (1757). Histoire Du Diocese De Paris: Contenant la suite des Paroisses du Doyenné de Châteaufort (in French). Vol. Tome VIII. Paris: Prault.
- De Grouchy, Vicomte (1893). "Meudon, Belleville et Chaville". Mémoires de la Société de l'histoire de Paris et de l'Île-de-France. 20: 51–206, at pp. 61 ff.
- Salvador Miranda, The Cardinals of the Holy Roman Church: Antoine Sanguin. Retrieved: 2016-05-18.
