= Jean III de Brosse =

Count of Penthièvre from 1480 to 1502

de Brosse's coat of arms.

Jean III de Brosse (died 1502) was Count of Penthièvre from 1480 until his death. He was the elder son of Jean II de Brosse and Nicole, Countess of Penthièvre.

On 15 May 1468, he married Louise de Laval, daughter of Guy XIV de Laval and Isabelle of Brittany. They had one son, René de Brosse, and four daughters.

== Ancestry ==
Ancestors of Jean III de Brosse

16. Louis I de Brosse
8. Pierre II de Brosse, Lord of Boussac
17. Constance de La Tour
4. Jean I de Brosse, Lord of Boussac
18. Louis de Malval, Lord of Maleval
9. Marguerite de Malval, Lady of La Forêt
19. Galienne de Malval
2. Jean II de Brosse, Lord of Boussac
20. Périchon de Naillac, Viscount of Bridiers
10. Guillaume de Naillac, Viscount of Bridiers
21. Olive de Saint-Georges
5. Jeanne de Naillac, Lady of Motte-Jolivet
22. Guy Turpin, Lord of Crissé
11. Jeanne Turpin
23. Marie de Rochefort
1. Jean III de Brosse
24. Charles de Châtillon
12. Jean I de Châtillon, Count of Penthièvre
25. Jeanne de Penthièvre
6. Charles de Châtillon, Lord of Avaugour
26. Olivier V de Clisson, Count of Porhoët
13. Marguerite de Clisson, Lady of Champtoceau
27. Catherine de Montmorency-Laval
3. Nicole, Countess of Penthièvre
28. Renaud I de Vivonne, Lord of Thors
14. Savary V de Vivonne, Lord of Thors
29. Catherine d'Ancenis, Lady of Esnandes
7. Isabeau de Vivonne, Lady of Thors
30. Galois d'Aspremont, Lord of Rié
15. Jeanne d'Aspremont, Lady of Régnac
31. Julienne Soual

== See also ==
- Jean IV de Brosse

== Notes ==
| Preceded by Nicole | Count of Penthièvre; 1480 – 1502 | Succeeded by René |
