= Labrosse =

Labrosse may refer to:

People

- Ben Labrosse (born 1999), Canadian football player
- Claude LaBrosse (born 1934), Canadian former professional ice hockey defenceman
- Francis Labrosse (born 1979), Seychellois judoka
- Jeanne Geneviève Labrosse (1775–1847) French balloonist and parachutist. The wife of Andre-Jacques Garnerin, a hydrogen balloonist and inventor of the parachute.
- Louis-Joseph Labrosse, Canadian notary and political figure
- Sarah-Jeanne Labrosse, Canadian actress
- Simon Labrosse, Canadian businessman and political figure

Other

- Labrosse, Loiret, a commune in the Loiret department in France

== See also ==
- La Brosse
