= Nicole, Countess of Penthièvre =

Nicole of Penthièvre

Countess of Penthièvre
- Reign: 1454 – 1480
- Predecessor: John II
- Successor: John III
- Born: c. 1424
- Died: After 3 January 1480
- Spouse: Jean II de Brosse
- House: House of Châtillon
- Father: Charles, Seigneur d'Avaugour
- Mother: Isabeau de Vivonne

Nicole (c. 1424 – after 3 January 1480) was Countess of Penthièvre from 1454 until her death.

== Biography ==
Nicole was the daughter of Charles, Seigneur d'Avaugour, and Isabeau de Vivonne. Her father was the third son of John I, Count of Penthièvre, son of Charles of Blois and Joan, Duchess of Brittany, but he died in 1434. When her elder uncles, Olivier and John II died, she succeeded to the county of Penthièvre as primogeniture heir. With her succession, she also inherited the Penthièvre claim to the Breton ducal throne. On 3 January 1480, she sold her rights to Brittany to King Louis XI for 50,000 livres.

== Family ==
Nicole married on 18 June 1437 Jean II de Brosse (1423 – 1482), with whom she had:

- Jean III de Brosse (died 1502), her successor
- Antoine, married Jeanne de La Praye
- Pauline de Brosse, married John II, Count of Nevers
- Claudine de Brosse (1450–1513), married Philip II, Duke of Savoy
- Bernarde of Brosse, married William VIII, Marquess of Montferrat
- Hélène of Brosse, married Boniface III, Marquess of Montferrat, brother of William VIII

== Sources ==
- Levron, Jacques (1931). "Une lettre privée du XVe siècle". Bibliothèque de l'École des chartes (in French). 92: 247–249.
- Lewis, Peter Shervey (1972). The Recovery of France in the Fifteenth Century. Harper & Row.

French nobility
Preceded by John II	Countess of Penthièvre; 1454 – 1480	Succeeded by John III
