= Bonduelle =

French food company

Bonduelle S.A.
- Company type: Société Anonyme
- Traded as: Euronext Paris: BON; CAC Small
- Industry: Food processing, Waste Management
- Founded: 1853
- Founder: Louis-Antoine Bonduelle-Dalle & Louis Lesaffre-Roussel
- Headquarters: Villeneuve d'Ascq, France
- Key people: Christophe Bonduelle (Chairman); Xavier Unkovic (CEO)
- Products: Canned food, frozen food
- Revenue: ▲2.288 billion € (2017)
- Net income: -72 millions euros € (2018)
- Number of employees: 9,569 (in 2013/2014)
- Subsidiaries: Nortera Foods
- Website: www.bonduelle.com

Bonduelle is a French company producing processed vegetables.

== History ==
- The company was founded in 1853, when Louis Bonduelle-Dalle (23 October 1802 - 13 November 1880) and Louis Lesaffre-Roussel (1802–1869) established a grain and juniper berry distillery in Marquette-lez-Lille. On June 17, 1862, they expanded to a farm in Renescure, which they turned into a grain alcohol distillery.
- 1901 the company and its seven production sites were divided into three family-owned companies: Bonduelle, Lesaffre, and Lemaître.
- 1926 the business began canning peas. Demand in the 1930s enabled the company to expand, but the firm's operations were suspended in 1940 through the end of World War II.
- In the mid-1960s, the company began to improve its exports, and in 1968, began freezing vegetables. Several European subsidiaries were launched: in Germany in 1969, in Italy in 1972 and in England in 1973. By 1973, exports accounted for half of the company's turnover.
- 1980, Bonduelle acquired the Belgian canned food company, Marie Thumas, and purchased Cassegrain in 1989.
- The company continued to grow internationally, adding subsidiaries in Brazil in 1994 and Argentina in 1996.
- 1997, the company entered the "fresh processed" business with the acquisition of Salade Minute.
- In 2004, the Bonduelle Group created the Louis Bonduelle Foundation, which aims to promote the public use of vegetables by putting the benefits of vegetables to the public good.
- 2007, Bonduelle completed its acquisition of Canadian firm Aliments Carrière (Arctic Gardens brand), a leader in vegetables and frozen foods, which enabled gave it access to 39,500 hectares of farmland.
- 2010, Bonduelle bought France Champignon, a leading European mushroom company.
- 2011, Bonduelle inaugurated the San Paolo d’Argon plant in Italy, the largest packaged green salad production site. Bonduelle took over the Kelet Food assets in Hungary and the Cecab Group assets in Russia. In the United States, Bonduelle bought 3 frozen food plants and a packaging site from the Allens Group.
- 2017, Bonduelle acquired Ready Pac Foods, an American based manufacturer of food products featuring fresh produce.
- In April 2018, the company announced Guillaume Debrosse as the new CEO. In May 2023, the group announced Xavier Unkovic as its new CEO.
- In 2024, Bonduelle sold its bagged salad business to the brand Les Crudettes. That same year, the company decided to divest four of its eight European production sites.

== Controversies ==
=== Operation in Russia ===
In a press release originally published on March 17, 2022, Bonduelle stated on their website that they would continue to operate in Russia but that the company will "dedicate all of our profits from sales in Russia to the future reconstruction of Ukraine".

On December 24, 2022, social media reports from members of NAFO (group) pointed to Bonduelle's Eurasia CEO, Ekaterina Eliseeva having authorised the sending of 10,000 "holiday boxes" with canned corn and peas to the Russian military at the frontlines, along with a message wishing the Russian forces “a speedy victory”. Alleged photos showing the gifts would originate from the Russian city of Yartsevo's Russian social network site on VKontakte. French human rights freelance journalist Stéphane Kenech would investigate the pictures and show how Bonduelle's food makes it to frontline Russian soldiers operating in Ukraine.

On December 31, 2022, Bonduelle would issue a response to the allegations claiming them as "fake", stating that Russian social media was spreading misleading information and that Bonduelle would continue to operate in Russia. Ukrainian National Agency on Corruption Prevention lists Bonduelle among International Sponsors of War.

=== Link to Russia's Federal Intelligence Service ===
On December 31, 2022, Twitter users identified a 2019 Forbes Russia article showing that Bonduelle's Eurasia CEO, Ekaterina Eliseeva had previously attended and received translator training at the FSB Academy and graduated in 1995. The company has responded that the allegations against its management are false.

== Brands ==
- Bonduelle (Europe, Americas)
- Cassegrain (France)
- Globus (ex-CEI)
- Arctic Gardens (Canada)
- Del Monte (Canada) (processed fruit and vegetables only)
- Ready Pac Foods (US)

== Financial data ==
Financial data in million Euros
| Period | July 2013 - June 2014 | 2018 | 2019 | 2020 | 2021 | 2022 | 2023 |
|---|---|---|---|---|---|---|---|
| Turnover | 1,921 | 2,776 | 2,777 | 2,855 | 2,779 | 2,892 | 2,406 |
| Operating income | 103 | 124 | 124 | 109 | 100 | 53 | 66 |
| Net profit | 15 | 72 | 72 | 54 | 57 | 35 | 14 |

- 9,569 full-time equivalent employees in 2013/2014
- 48 industrial sites
- 100,000 hectares cultivated by 3,440 farmers under contract.
- Canned goods make up 51% of turnover, fresh vegetables (including the line of ready-to-eat products)account for 22% and frozen foods account for the remaining 27% of the company's sales turnover.

== Stock market data ==
- Shares traded on the Paris Stock Exchange
- Member of the CAC Mid & Small, CAC All Shares, CAC All Tradable
- ISIN code = FR0000063935
- Face value = Euro
- Shareholder breakdown:
  - General partners 27.63%
  - Other members of Bonduelle family 24.75%
  - Public 38.80%
  - Employees and treasury shares 8.81%

Stock market data as of 30 June 2014
| Outstanding securities | 32 million € |
| Stock market capitalisation | 685.12 million € |
| Average monthly trading volume | 330,184 |

== Governance ==
The following served as officers of the company:

- Chief Executive Officer: Xavier Unkovic
- Non-Executive Chairman: Christophe Bonduelle
- Director, Bonduelle Development: Benoît Bonduelle
- Director of External Relations and Sustainable Development: Jean-Bernard Bonduelle
- Human Resources Director: Bruno Rauwel
- Administrative and Financial Director: Grégory Sanson
- Director, Bonduelle Long Life Europe : Philippe Carreau
- Director, Bonduelle Americas: Daniel Vielfaure
- Director, Bonduelle Fresh Europe: Pascal Bredeloux
