= Joasil Déméus Débrosse =

Joasil Déméus Débrosse (12 January 1968 – 13 January 2013) was a Haitian journalist and philanthropist. He ran for the Haitian Congress twice and lost both times. He died January 13, 2013, in a hospital center in Port-au-Prince. He was the Radio Star Presenter of Morning Train, a program broadcast every morning on Radio TV Zenith.

== Early life ==
Débrosse was born in the Province of Artibonite. He was one of the eight children of Joseph Dieulifort Joasil and Marie Merzila Elysée Joasil. Because of his intelligence, he was sent to Port-au-Prince to continue his education.

== Career ==
He first ran for elected office in 2000 and found it necessary to boycott the elections when Fanmi Lavalas, the political party of President Jean Bertrand Aristide, was about to win. After Lavalas' parliamentary victory in 2000, Joasil retreated from politics to concentrate on social work and philanthropy. He sent scores of impoverished children to school using his own funds. He had no children of his own. He used his last savings to feed street people and have-nots.

Joasil created the Noël Emmanuel Limage Foundation, the namesake of a former Haitian Senator from Artibonite. Through the foundation, he accomplished his social and philanthropic works. At the same time, he restructured his radio show and named it: Train Matinal, a program whose content was clearly social, political, and religious. His show presented diverse views representing the diverse beliefs of Haitians inside the country and in the diaspora.

== Personal life ==
In December 2010, Joasil Déméus Débrosse married Jerry Milfort, a nurse in Arcahaie. They had no children.
