= Governor of Brittany =

This page is a list of royal governors of Brittany during the Ancien Régime.

- Nominoe (841-851)
- Enguerrand VII, Lord of Coucy (1380–1397)
- Jean de Laval, husband of Françoise de Foix (1528-1554)
- Jean IV de Brosse (1554-1565)
- Sébastien de Luxembourg (1565-1569)
- Louis III de Bourbon, Duke of Montpensier (1569–1582)
- Philippe Emmanuel, Duke of Mercœur (1582–1598)
- César de Bourbon, Duke of Vendôme (1608–1626)
- Armand-Jean du Plessis, Cardinal Richelieu (1626–1642)
- Queen Anne of France (1642-1666)
- François Louis de Rousselet, Marquis de Châteaurenault (1704–1716)
- Louis-Alexandre de Bourbon, Comte de Toulouse (1716–1737)
- Louis Jean Marie de Bourbon, Duke of Penthièvre (1737–1753)
- Emmanuel-Armand de Richelieu, Duke of Aiguillon (1753 – c. 1770)
