= Counts and dukes of Penthièvre =

Breton noble title

Heraldic banner of arms

In the 11th and 12th centuries the Countship of Penthièvre (Breton: Penteur) in Brittany (now in the department of Côtes-d'Armor) belonged to a branch of the sovereign House of Brittany. It initially belonged to the House of Rennes. Alan III, Duke of Brittany, gave it to his brother Eudes in 1035, and his descendants formed a cadet branch of the ducal house.

The geographical region of Brittany that constituted the holdings of Penthièvre correlate closely with the territories that constituted the early Breton kingdom of Domnonée.

The history of the title Count of Penthièvre included frequent dispossessions and restorations. Henri d'Avaugour, heir of this family, was dispossessed of the countship in 1235. The Duke of Brittany, Pierre Mauclerc, founder of the Breton House of Dreux, gave it as dowry to his daughter, Yolande, on her marriage in 1238 to Hugh XI of Lusignan, Count of La Marche. John I, Duke of Brittany, Yolande's brother, seized the countship on her death in 1272. After the Breton War of Succession the title was dispossessed twice by the reigning Dukes of Brittany, once by John V and another time by Francis II.

== Disputed heirs to the Ducal Crown of Brittany ==
In 1337 Joan the Lame, Duchess of Brittany, brought Penthièvre to her husband, Charles de Châtillon, Count of Blois. Joan was the daughter of Guy de Penthièvre, the younger full brother of John III.

When John III died a dispute emerged regarding the inheritance of the Duchy of Brittany. John III had tried to prevent the inheritance of the duchy by his half brother John of Montfort. Joan and Charles claimed the ducal crown and were subsequently proclaimed the Duchess and Duke of Brittany, which John of Montfort also claimed. Their dispute prompted the War of the Breton Succession. In 1352, during that war, the Estates of Brittany were established. In 1364, Charles died and John IV, Duke of Brittany, John of Montfort's son, was confirmed as duke. Joan was permitted to keep Penthièvre and use the title Duchess of Brittany until her death.

Under the Treaty of Guérande (1365), Joan recognized John IV as the undisputed duke. When John went into exile in England in 1373, Charles V of France named his brother Louis, Duke of Anjou lieutenant-general of Brittany. Louis was also a son-in-law of Joan de Penthièvre. Under the second Treaty of Guérande (1381), it was agreed that, in the event the House of Montfort failed to produce a male heir, the senior male heir of Joan would be recognized as duke.

Joan died in 1384 and left Penthièvre to her oldest son, John (1340–1404). In turn, John left the county to his son, Olivier, Count of Penthièvre (1389–1433), who forfeited the title in 1421 after kidnapping and attempting to blackmail John V, Duke of Brittany.

Olivier's brother John II (1393–1454) recovered the county but died childless, passing his titles on to Nicole (1424–1480), daughter of his brother Charles, Lord of Avaugour (1396–1434).

In 1437, Nicole married Jean II de Brosse. She was deprived of Penthièvre by Francis II, Duke of Brittany in 1465, thus undermining the Penthièvre family's position in the duchy. When Francis died in 1488, Nicole's eldest son Jean III de Brosse (d. 1502) asserted his family's claim to the duchy against those of Anne, Duchess of Brittany, who ultimately ascended to the title.

== As Dukes of Penthièvre ==
The countship of Penthièvre was restored to Sébastien de Luxembourg, heir of the Brosse family through his mother, Charlotte de Brosse (1506-1540), great-granddaughter of Nicole de Blois through her son Jean (d. 1502) and grandson Rene (1470-1524). The countship was erected for him into a duchy in the peerage of France in 1569. Afterwards it was held by Sebastian's daughter, Marie de Luxembourg, (1562-1623), who also became Duchess of Mercœur by marriage.

Philippe Emmanuel, Duke of Mercœur, brother-in-law of Henry III of France (last living male-line grandson of Claude of France, Duchess of Brittany), and a leader of the Catholic League, was made governor of Brittany by the king in 1582. Invoking the hereditary rights of his wife, Marie de Luxembourg, he endeavoured to make himself independent in that province from 1589 onwards, and organized a government at Nantes, proclaiming their young son, Philippe de Lorraine-Mercœur, (d. 1590), "prince and duke of Brittany". He allied with Spain and defeated Henry IV of France's attempts to subjugate Brittany until 20 March 1598 when Mercœur was forced to surrender and subsequently went in exile to Hungary. Philippe died young, leaving his sister, Françoise de Lorraine-Mercœur the duchy of Penthièvre.

== Later dukes from various houses ==
The Duchess of Vendôme's grandson, Louis Joseph, duc de Vendôme, inherited Penthièvre in 1669, but it was taken from him by decree in 1687 and adjudged to Marie Anne de Bourbon, Princess de Conti. In 1696, it was sold to Louis-Alexandre de Bourbon, Count de Toulouse, whose son, Louis de Bourbon, bore the title Duke de Penthièvre. This title passed by inheritance to the House of Orléans.

== Counts of Penthièvre ==
=== House de Rennes ===
- Eudes (1035–1079), son of Geoffrey I, Duke of Brittany
- Geoffrey I (1079–1093), son of Eudes
- Stephen I (1093–1125), son of Eudes, brother of Geoffrey I
- Geoffrey II (1125–1148), son of Stephen I
- Rivallo (1148–1162), son of Geoffrey II
- Stephen II (1162–1164), son of Rivallo
- Geoffrey III (1164–1177), son of Geoffrey II, brother of Stephen II
- Alan I (1177–1212), cousin of Geoffrey III, grandson of Stephen I through his son Henry, called Henry I
- Henry II of Avagour (1212–1230), son of Alan I, was dispossessed of Penthièvre by Peter I, Duke of Brittany, who gave it to his daughter Yolande on her marriage to Hugh XI of Lusignan

==== Lords of Avaugour ====
- Alan II (1230–1267), son of Henry II
- Henry III (1267–1301), son of Alan II
- Henry IV (1301–1334), son of Henry III
- Joan (1334–1384), granddaughter of Henry IV

=== Capetian House of Dreux ===
- Peter Mauclerc (1230–1237), son of Robert II of Dreux
- Yolande (1237-1272), daughter of Peter
- John I (1272–1286), son of Peter
- John II (1286–1305), son of John I
- Arthur II (1305–1312), son of John II
- Guy (1312–1331), son of Arthur II
- Joan (1331–1384), Countess of Penthièvre suo jure; daughter of Guy, granddaughter of Henry IV of Avagour, married Charles de Blois-Châtillon, lost Breton War of Succession, but retained the county with all rights under the Treaty of Guerande of 1365

=== House of Blois-Châtillon ===
- John I (1384–1404), son of Joan; his widow would join in attempting the abduction and imprisonment of the duke of Brittany, only to be imprisoned herself by the duchess.
- Olivier (1404–1433), son of John - lost the countship and the rights of Penthièvre to the duke of Brittany after attempting his imprisonment and presumed overthrow in 1420.
- John II (1433–1454), second son of John - some aspects of Penthièvre were restored.
- Nicole (1454–1479), granddaughter of John through his third son, Charles. She married Jean II de Brosse

=== House of Brosse ===
- John (1454–1482), husband of Nicole, Count of Penthièvre jure uxoris
- John III (1482–1502), son of John V and Nicole
- René (1502–1524), son of John VI
- John IV (1524–1566), son of René

== Dukes of Penthièvre ==
=== House of Luxembourg ===
- Sebastian (1566–1569), nephew of John IV. Sebastian was son of Charlotte de Brosse, daughter of René.
- Marie (1569–1623), daughter of Sebastian, married Philippe Emmanuel de Lorraine.

=== House of Lorraine ===
- Philippe Emmanuel de Lorraine (1576–1602)
- Françoise de Lorraine (1602–1669), married César de Bourbon

=== House of Bourbon-Vendôme ===
- César de Bourbon (1608–1665), legitimised son of Henry IV of France
- Louis II de Bourbon-Vendôme (1665–1669), son of César de Vendôme
- Louis III Joseph de Vendôme (1669–1712), son of Louis II de Bourbon-Vendôme
  - Sold to Marie Anne, légitimée de Bourbon in 1696.

=== House of Bourbon-Penthièvre ===
- Louis Alexandre de Bourbon (1697–1737), Count of Toulouse, Duke of Rambouillet, legitimised son of Louis XIV of France
- Louis de Bourbon (1737–1793), son of Louis Alexandre de Bourbon, Count of Toulouse

=== House of Orléans ===
==== Second Restoration ====
- Charles d'Orléans (1820–1828), son of Louis Philippe III, Duke of Orléans (the future King of the French)

==== July Monarchy ====
- Pierre d'Orléans (1845–1919), son of François d'Orléans, prince de Joinville

== See also ==
- Duchy of Brittany
- Earl of Richmond
- Dukes of Brittany family tree
- Eudes, Count of Penthièvre
- Joanna, Countess of Penthièvre suo jure
