= Sébastien de Luxembourg =

French military officer, peer of France and governor of Brittany

- Seigneur de Martigues
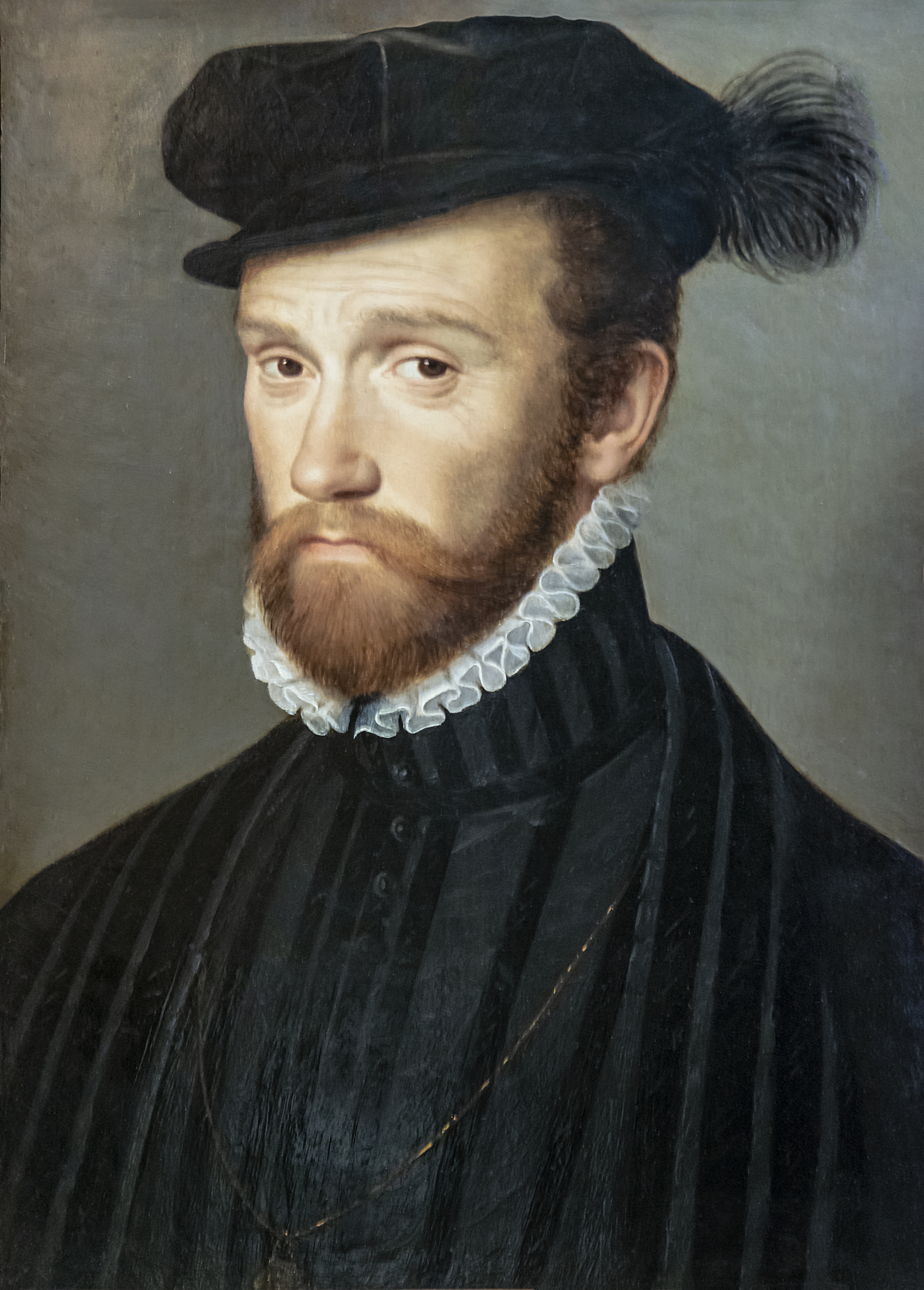
- Portrait of Martigues
- Other titles: Governor of Brittany; Duke of Penthièvre
- Born: January 1530; Kingdom of France
- Died: 19 November 1569 (aged 39); Saint-Jean-d'Angély, Kingdom of France
- Family: House of Luxembourg
- Spouse: Marie de Beaucaire
- Issue: Marie de Luxembourg
- Father: François de Luxembourg, Viscount of Martigues
- Mother: Charlotte de Brosse

Sébastien de Luxembourg, vicomte de Martigues (1530-1569) was a French military officer, peer of France and governor of Brittany. Martigues began his political career serving under his uncle Étampes the governor of Brittany as the lieutenant-general of the province. He gained the office of colonel-general of the French infantry after the prior office holder died at the siege of Rouen during the first war of religion. In this important military role he played a key part in the royal victory at the Battle of Dreux, the main battle of the first of the French Wars of Religion. In 1565 on the death of his uncle, he gained both the governorship of Brittany and the county of Penthièvre which was subsequently elevated to a dukedom.

During the second civil war he assisted the royal army in reaching full strength to hunt down the rebel army that was fleeing eastwards, before the abrupt peace restored the status quo in March 1568. Unhappy with the peace Martigues was among those campaigning for the crown to break off from the terms and renew hostilities, and he played a part in the opening campaign of the third civil war that September. Having participated at the crushing royal victory of Moncontour he was killed in the subsequent siege of Saint-Jean-d'Angély on 19 November 1569.

== Early life and family ==
=== Parents ===
Martigues was the son of François de Luxembourg and Charlotte de Brosse, daughter of René de Brosse. Martigues was the nephew of Étampes and served under him when he was made governor of Brittany as lieutenant-general for the governorship. He was further allowed to inherit the estates of his uncle that had been confiscated during the League of the Public Weal, making him first comte then duc de Penthièvre.

=== Marriage and children ===
In 1556 he married Marie de Beaucaire (1535-1613), a daughter of Jean de Beaucaire sieur de Puyguillon, or Péguillon, and Guyonne de Breüil. She was a lady in waiting to Mary, Queen of Scots. He asked the queen of Scots to be godmother to his daughter Marie in 1562 and she sent David Beaton of Melgund as her representative. His daughter and heiress Marie de Luxembourg married Philippe-Emmanuel de Lorraine, duc de Mercœur, a prominent member of the Ligue in Brittany.

== Reign of Francis II ==
He participated at the Siege of Leith in 1560. He arrived in January and the Protestants captured two of his ships laden with supplies, and it was said he was so angry he tore his beard out - "he rent his hair from his beard so clean as though he had been new shaven." In April he joked that the English army had arrived only to besiege the village of Restalrig. He returned to France aboard the Primrose in July.

== Reign of Charles IX ==
=== First civil war ===
During the siege of Rouen in 1562, the colonel-general of the infantry Randan was killed. Martigues was selected as his replacement and would become the new colonel-general of the infantry. In December the royal army successfully brought the main force under Condé to battle at Dreux. Martigues played an important role on the right of the royal army, commanding a block of veteran French infantry. He and his troops were held in reserve for much of the battle, until it was deployed late in the day, when the Huguenot cavalry looked like it might overwhelm the crowns forces. Martigues' troops formed up a square and held the cavalry off, after which Coligny ordered the Protestant forces to retreat from the field.

Upon the death of his uncle on 31 January 1565, Martigues became governor of Brittany. He would hold this office until his death.

=== Second civil war ===
With the rebel army bested at the Battle of Saint Denis, Condé withdrew his forces eastwards. Before the royal army could pursue him, reorganisation was necessary. Breton cavalry under Martigues was hurriedly raised and sent to Paris to help form the nucleus of the pursuit army. His 3000 troops passed through Chartres in their march to the east, stripping the town bare of all its supplies.

An ally of the militant Catholic Charles, Cardinal of Lorraine, Martigues was among those councillors who desired to overturn the peace settlement agreed with the Peace of Longjumeau in 1568. As the peace broke down, Montgommery and the Vidame de Chartres moved south from Brittany pursued by Martigues.

=== Third civil war ===
With the resumption of civil war in late 1568, the Protestant nobility fled south to regroup at La Rochelle, to provide support to them an army assembled in Provence and began marching north. In early November Martigues and Louis, Duke of Montpensier met the rebel force in battle and destroyed it. Following the crushing royal victory at the Battle of Moncontour the royal army, after some debate, decided to press their advantage rather than seeking terms. To this end they began siege of Saint-Jean-d'Angély on 16 October 1569. Martigues who had fought with the royal army at Moncontour fought in the siege, and was shot dead by one of the defenders while he was in the siege trenches on 19 November 1569.

== Sources ==
- Harding, Robert (1978). Anatomy of a Power Elite: the Provincial Governors in Early Modern France. Yale University Press.
- Knecht, Robert (1998). Catherine de' Medici. Routledge.
- Sutherland, Nicola (1980). The Huguenot Struggle for Recognition. Yale University Press.
- Wood, James (2002). The Kings Army: Warfare, Soldiers and Society during the Wars of Religion in France, 1562-1576. Cambridge University Press.

French nobility
Preceded by Jean IV de Brosse	Comte de Penthièvre; 1566–1569	Succeeded by Marie of Luxembourg, Duchess of Penthièvre
