= Louis Bonduelle Foundation =

Canadian corporate organization

- Founded: 2004, France
- Founders: Bonduelle SAS & Bonduelle Conserve International SAS
- Type: Corporate foundation
- Purpose: Promoting the public interest of vegetables, putting the benefits of vegetables at the service of the general interest
- Location: Villeneuve-d'Ascq
- Region served: France, Italie, Belgique, Pays-Bas, Canada
- Method: Research awards, calls for projects, setting up projects and day conferences
- Website: www.fondation-louisbonduelle.org

The Louis Bonduelle Foundation, set up in 2004, is the Bonduelle group's corporate foundation. It acts internationally with the aim of changing eating habits in a sustainable manner, by providing everyone with the means of bringing vegetables into their daily life. It undertakes to inform, raise awareness, support research and act on the ground.

== History ==
=== Origins ===
The Louis Bonduelle Foundation was set up in 2004 for two reasons. Public health problems linked to poor diet, especially obesity, continue to grow worryingly whereas products guaranteeing good nutritional balance are available throughout the year at affordable prices. It was in this context of misinformation and lack of motivation in terms of vegetable consumption that Bonduelle decided to set up its corporate foundation.

=== The Founders ===
Two Bonduelle group subsidiaries are the founders of the corporate foundation: Bonduelle SAS and Bonduelle Conserve International.

=== Origin of the Foundation's name ===
The foundation bears the name of Louis Bonduelle, who started the first Bonduelle company. In 1853, Louis Bonduelle-Dalle and his friend Louis Lesaffre-Roussel decided to form a partnership to start a grain and juniper distillery under the name of "Lesaffre et Bonduelle, Alcools de l'Abbaye"

=== Significant dates ===
- In 2005, the Louis Bonduelle Foundation was set up in Italy and the "Day of the Vegetable" was launched in France. Kits were distributed to participating restaurateurs to make Tuesdays the day of the vegetable (promotion of vegetables in dishes offered, activities based around their benefits, etc.)
- In 2006, the first Louis Bonduelle Research Award for €10,000 was set up to reward research in the field of nutrition or eating habits, in any subject area: medicine, physiology, sociology, agronomy, etc.
- In 2007, the Louis Bonduelle Foundation was set up in Benelux (Belgium and the Netherlands) and the first call for projects was launched in France: the Foundation now supports local initiatives launched by associations, schools, etc. to help individuals improve their eating habits.
- In 2008, the Foundation decided to set up an annual day conference for those involved in changes in eating habits: the Louis Bonduelle Foundation Conference. Each year, experts talk on a specific nutrition-related theme.
- In 2010, the Louis Bonduelle Foundation was set up in Canada.

== How the Foundation operates ==
The Louis Bonduelle Foundation is managed by a Board of Directors with seven members appointed and reappointed by the founder; their positions are unpaid. There are three independent members chosen by the founder for their experience in the corporate foundation's area of work and four members are representatives of the Bonduelle group.

== The Foundation's Mission ==
=== Supporting research ===
The Louis Bonduelle Foundation encourages scientific research (medical, nutritional, sociological and agronomic) to better understand the interactions between eating habits, vegetables and health. Two Research Awards are granted: the Louis Bonduelle Prize for young researchers and the ECOG/Louis Bonduelle Foundation Prize for the fight against child obesity. The Louis Bonduelle Foundation is also joint-founder of the Fondation Coeur et Artères (Heart and Arteries Foundation) which is involved in the fight against cardiovascular diseases.

=== Louis Bonduelle Foundation Conference ===
Each year, the Louis Bonduelle Foundation organises a day conference based on a scientific subject related to vegetables and nutrition. This event, known as the Louis Bonduelle Foundation Conference, involves those concerned with changes in eating habits such as experts, research directors and project developers.

== Act in the field ==
Many actions are launched by schools and associations to facilitate people's access to fruit and vegetables. The Louis Bonduelle Foundation has supported these initiatives since 2008 with two calls for proposals per year. In addition, the Foundation also carries out its own projects aimed at improving eating habits. Eleven initiatives have been launched in Europe since 2005 for different categories of people such as children, the elderly or people lacking job security.

== Inform the public and health professionals ==
Through its website, and its exhibitions and conferences, the Louis Bonduelle Foundation provides information to the general public, health professionals, teachers, etc. This relates to recent news on nutrition, the benefits of vegetables, and simple acts to improve consumption of fruit and vegetables. The Foundation also gives information on the different projects it supports and its various calls for proposals.

== Bibliography ==
- Bonduelle, Bruno (2004). 1853-2003, Cent cinquante ans d'agroalimentaire. La Voix du Nord. ISBN 2-84393-064-2.
