= Bross =

- Language: German

Origin
- Meaning: "immortal" or "divine" (patronymic) or "to sprout or bud" (nonpatronymic)
- Region of origin: Germany

Bross is a patronymic surname of German origin. The Latin name Ambrosius (of which "Bross" is a reduced form) was popular in early Christian Germany primarily because of the fame of Saint Ambrose of Milan (Aurelius Ambrosius), whose name comes from the Greek Αμβροσιος (Ambrosios) which means "immortal" or "divine". The portion of the etymology of Aμβρόσιος from which Bross comes is βροτός (Brotos) which means "mortal."

== Demographics ==
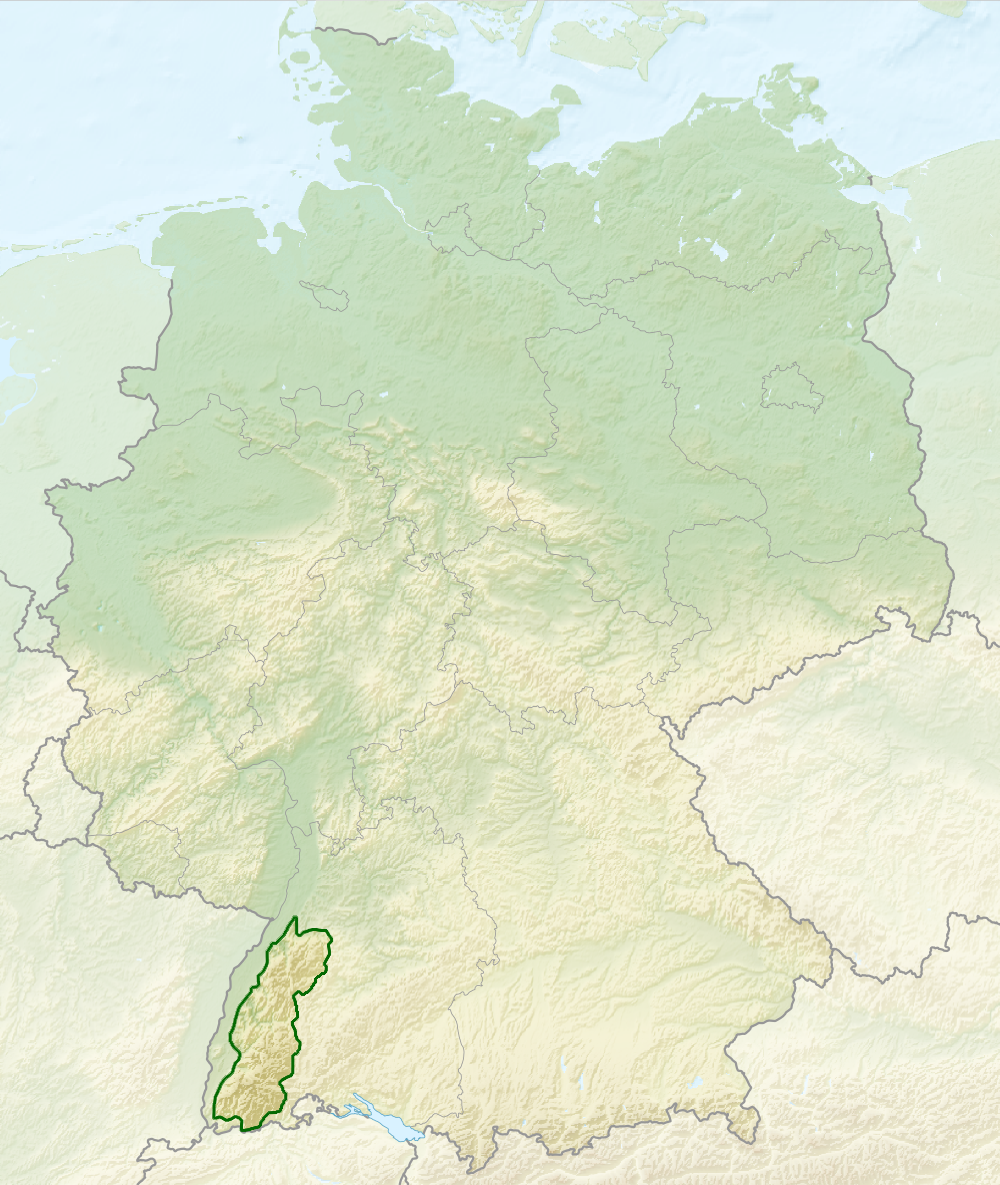
Position of the Black Forest in Germany where the surname Bross originated

The 2010 United States Census lists 2,385 instances of the surname Bross while the 2020 Census lists 2,070 instances.

The 2000 United States Census lists 2,486 individuals with the surname Bross living in the United States and there were roughly 7,000 individuals worldwide. At that time, 159 lived in France though they are almost exclusively clustered in the regions to the extreme East, near the border with Germany. Thus, 66 percent of Brosses live in the US, Germany, and France, with the greatest concentration found in the German state of Baden-Württemberg centered around the western portions of the Black Forest.

There are several French names which begin with Bross but they are not related to the German form. Examples include Brosseau and Brossard.

== In popular culture ==
- In the fictional Star Wars universe, Bross is the name of a starfighter pilot in the New Republic's Gold Squadron.

== Prominent people surnamed Bross ==
- Eric Bross, American film director
- Matt Bross (1903–1989), American football player
- John A. Bross (1826–1864), colonel in the Union Army
- Rebecca Bross, American artistic gymnast
- Simón Bross, Mexican director and producer
- Stephen Decatur Bross (1813–1888/9), settler in Nebraska
- Terry Bross, American baseball pitcher
- William Bross (1813–1890), American publisher and politician

== See also ==
- Mount Bross, colorado
