= Charles-Léonce Brossé =

French artist

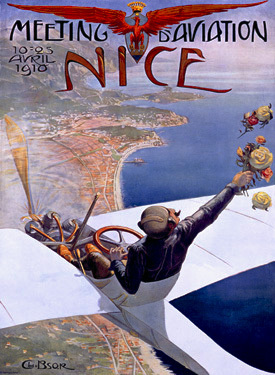
Brossé's Meeting d'Aviation Nice, 1910

Charles-Léonce Brossé (1871–1945), also known as Bsor or Bzor, was a French painter; engraver and lithographer.

He is best known for his poster Meeting d'Aviation Nice, created to promote an early aviation meeting (or air show) held in Nice, France, from April 10 to 25, 1910. The artwork features a pilot scattering roses from an aircraft flying high above the coastline of Nice. Notably, the shape of the aircraft's left wing is echoed in the curves of the water above and below the right wing, creating a sense of symmetry and motion.

The poster’s typography is rendered in a distinct Art Nouveau style and surrounds a crowned red eagle, symbolizing the coat of arms of Nice. The eagle’s dramatically extended wings resemble those of an airplane, reinforcing the aviation theme. The poster has been credited with enhancing Nice’s glamorous image. It has been widely reprinted and reproduced on various merchandise, including coffee mugs.

Brossé also designed bookplates, including one in 1912 for the noted alpinist Victor Spitalieri de Cessole.
