= Philippe Emmanuel, Duke of Mercœur =

French and Breton nobleman (1558–1602)

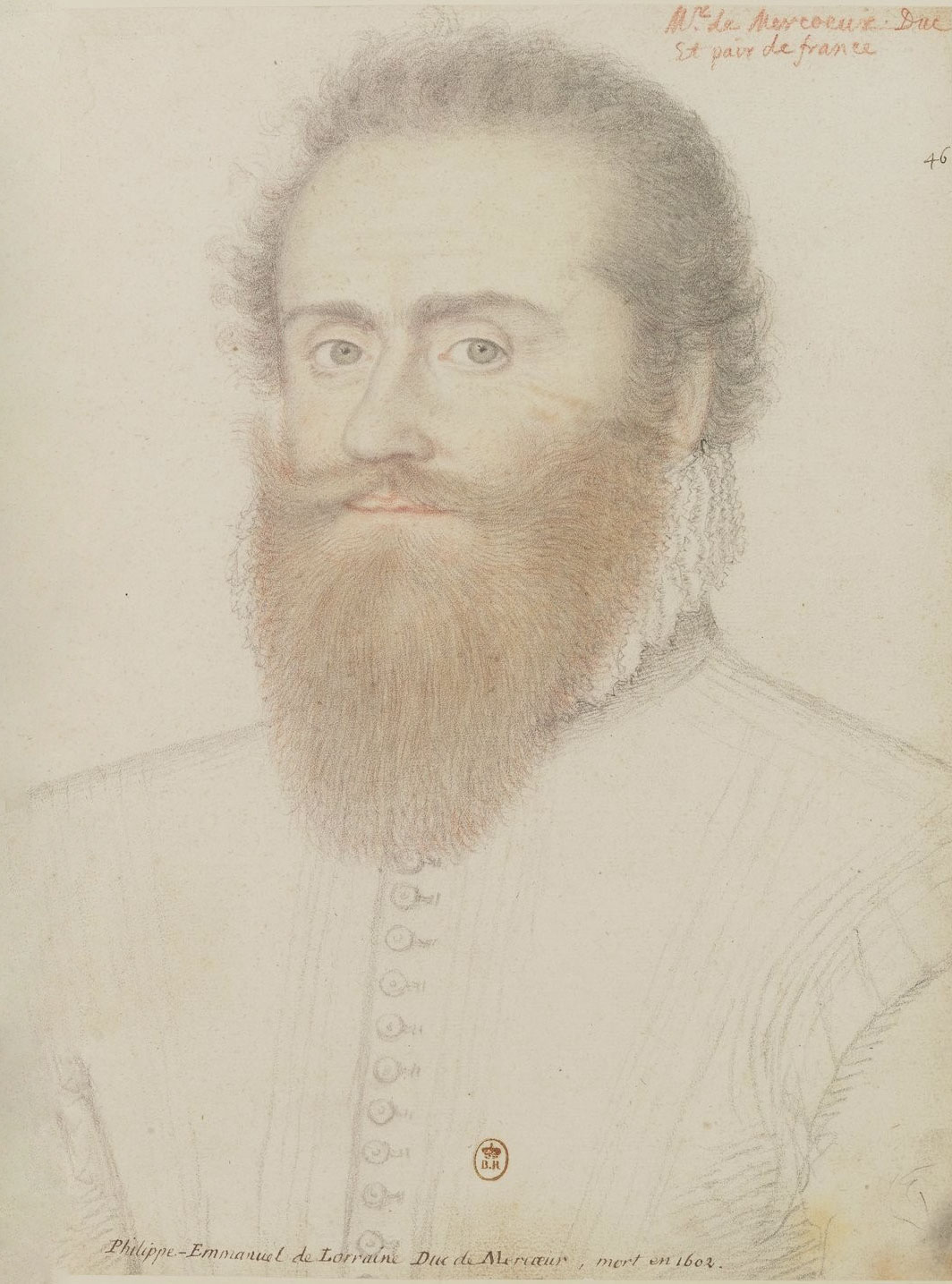
- Le duc de Mercoeur by Benjamin Foulon
- Native name: Philippe-Emmanuel de Lorraine, duc de Mercoeur
- Born: 9 September 1558; Nomeny, France
- Died: 19 February 1602 (aged 43); Nuremberg, Germany
- Noble family: Lorraine
- Spouse: Marie de Luxembourg, Duchess of Penthièvre
- Issue: Françoise
- Father: Nicholas, Count of Vaudémont
- Mother: Jeanne de Savoie-Nemours
- Occupation: Governor of Brittany; Holy League member

Philippe-Emmanuel de Lorraine, Duke of Mercœur and of Penthièvre (9 September 1558, in Nomeny, Meurthe-et-Moselle – 19 February 1602, in Nürnberg) was a French soldier, a prince of the Holy Roman Empire and a prominent member of the Catholic League, who fought for Breton political independence from the House of Bourbon.

== Life ==
Philippe-Emmanuel de Lorraine, Duke of Mercoeur was born on 9 September 1558 in Nomeny, France, the eldest surviving son of Nicholas, Count of Vaudémont and Jeanne de Savoie-Nemours. In 1575, Mercoeur married Marie de Luxembourg, daughter of Sébastien de Luxembourg, which, together with the title of Duc de Penthièvre, also brought him rights to the crown of the Duchy of Brittany. He was made a knight of the Order of Saint Esprit in 1578.

=== Rebellion in Brittany ===
In 1582, after the death of the Duke of Montpensier, he was made governor of Brittany by Henry III of France, who had married his half-sister. In 1588 Mercœur joined the Catholic League in Brittany, and had himself proclaimed protector of the Catholic Church in the province.

His wife's family, the House of Penthièvre, were descendants of the House of Dreux as Dukes of Brittany. The House of Penthièvre had lost the dukedom of Brittany to the House of Montfort in the Breton War of Succession in the 14th century. They had subsequently attempted to overthrow the Montfortist Dukes, with no success. Claiming hereditary rights through his wife, Mercœur endeavoured to make himself independent monarch of the region, and organized a government at Nantes and naming his son "prince and duke of Brittany".

He formed an alliance with Spain and continued to press for his independence from France when the Huguenot Henry of Navarre converted to Catholicism and became King of France. King Henry IV of France sent a force against him led by the Duc de Montpensier. With the aid of the Spanish Royal Army, he defeated the French Royalist troops at the Battle of Craon in 1592. However, the royal troops were reinforced by English contingents and soon recovered the advantage. The king at last marched against Mercœur in person, but received his submission at Angers on 20 March 1598, the last member of the League to do so. King Henry IV assured his dynasty's future inheritance of Brittany by arranging the marriage of his illegitimate son, César Duc de Vendôme, to Mercœur's daughter Francoise.

=== Later years and death ===
Coat of arms of Philippe Emmanuel, Duke of Mercœur

Mercœur subsequently went to Hungary, where he entered the service of the emperor Rudolph II after answering the call to arms by the Holy Roman Emperor against the Ottomans. He fought against the Turks, defeating the Ottomans twice at the siege of Albe-Royale (Székesfehérvár) in 1601. He died after falling sick while returning to Lorraine in 1602. On 27 April, a Requiem Mass was celebrated for him at Notre-Dame de Paris, with the eulogy delivered by St. François de Sales.

== Family ==
Philippe married Marie de Luxembourg (1562–1623), Duchesse de Penthièvre and daughter of Sébastien, Duke of Penthièvre, on 12 July 1579 in Paris.

Philippe and Marie had:

1. Philippe Louis de Lorraine (21 May 1589 – 21 December 1590) died in infancy.
2. Françoise de Lorraine, Duchesse de Mercœur et de Penthièvre (November 1592 – 8 September 1669, Paris) Françoise married César de Bourbon, duc de Vendôme, an illegitimate son of Henry IV of France at Fontainebleau on 16 July 1608.

== Sources ==
- de Busbecq, Ogier Ghislain (2012). Foster, Charles Thornton; Daniell, F. H. Blackburne (eds.). The Life and Letters of Ogier Ghiselin de Busbecq: Seigneur of Bousbecque, Knight, Imperial Ambassador. Translated by Foster, Charles Thornton; Daniell, F.H. Blackburne. Cambridge University Press. ISBN 9781108054560.
- Knecht, Robert J. (2014). Catherine de'Medici. Routledge. ISBN 9781317896876.
- Watson, Jackie (2024). Epistolary Courtiership and Dramatic Letters. Edinburgh University Press. ISBN 9781474483407.
- "From Frenchman to Crusader: the political and military itinerary of Philippe Emmanuel Duke of Mercoeur". Academia.edu.

Philippe Emmanuel, Duke of Mercœur House of Lorraine Born: 9 September 1558 Died: 19 February 1602
French nobility
Preceded by Nicholas	Duke of Mercœur; 1577–1602	Succeeded by Françoise
Preceded by Nicholas	Marquis of Nomeny; 1577–1602	Succeeded by Marie suo jure
Preceded by Marie de Luxemburg, Duchess of Penthièvre	Duc de Penthièvre jure uxoris 1579–1602 with Marie de Luxemburg, duchesse de Penthièvre	Succeeded by Marie suo jure
