= René de Brosse =

French noble

- Count of Penthièvre
- Died: 24 February 1525; Pavia, Italy
- Noble family: Brosse
- Spouse: Jeanne de Commines
- Issue: Jean IV de Brosse; 3 daughters
- Father: Jean III de Brosse
- Mother: Louise de Laval

René de Brosse, also René de Bretagne was the elder son of Jean III de Brosse and Louise de Laval. He was killed at the Battle of Pavia on 24 February 1525.

== Family ==
He was Count of Penthièvre, married Jeanne de Commines (daughter of Philippe de Commines) and was the father of Jean IV de Brosse and three daughters:

- Jean IV de Brosse; he was, as John VII, last count of Penthièvre, with no offspring.
- Charlotte de Brosse, married François de Luxembourg; her son Sebastian de Luxembourg, 1st duke of Penthièvre, succeeded his uncle.
- two other daughters.

In 1516 he married Françoise de Maillé, but she died shortly after their marriage and they had no children together. He then married his third wife, Jeanne de Goufi of the House of Lucinge in Savoye, who some say was his second wife. Their daughter Françoise de Bretagne (also Françoise de Brosse) married Claude Gouffier in 1545; she died in childbirth in 1558.

== Notes ==
Preceded by Jean III	Comte de Penthièvre; 1502–1524	Succeeded by Jean IV
