= Jean II de Brosse =

de Brosse's coat of arms.

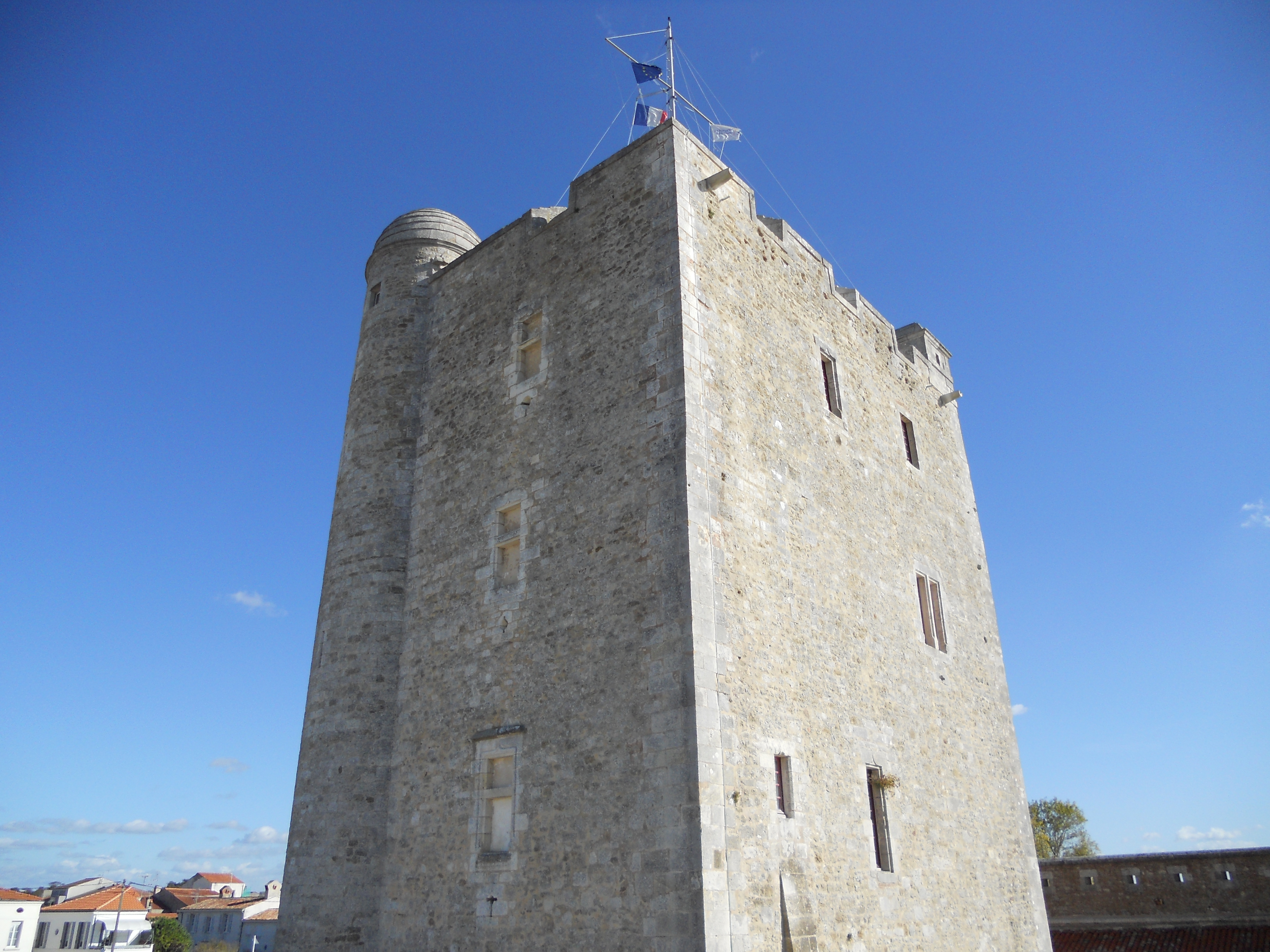
The Fouras donjon was rebuilt by Jean II de Brosse in 1480–1490.

Jean II de Brosse, also Jehan II de Brosse (1432 – 6 August 1482), was the elder son of Jean I de Brosse, Marshal of France. He would become chamberlain of the king of France in 1449. He married Nicole, Countess of Penthièvre, daughter of Charles, Seigneur d'Avaugour and Isabeau de Vivonne. Nicole later brought him, through inheritance in 1479, the County of Penthièvre in the Duchy of Brittany.

Jean is known to have rebuilt the donjon in Fouras in 1480–1490.

== Marriage and children ==
Jean and Nicole had following children :

- Jean III de Brosse (died 1502), his successor.
- Pauline de Brosse, married John II, Count of Nevers
- Claudine de Brosse (1450–1513), married Philip II, Duke of Savoy
- Bernarde of Brosse, married William VIII, Marquess of Montferrat
- Helena of Brosse, married Boniface III, Marquess of Montferrat, brother of William VIII.

== Sources ==
- Blomme, Yves (1987). L'architecture gothique en Saintonge et en Aunis (in French). Bordessoules.
- Cereia, Daniela (2018). "Femmes a la cour de Marguerite de Broubon (1438-1483) et Claude de Brosse, comtesses de Bresse (1471-1497)". In zum Kolk, Caroline; Wilson-Chevalier, Kathleen (eds.). Femmes à la cour de France: Charges et fonctions (XVe - XIXe siècle) (in French). Presses Universitaires Septentrion. pp. 227–238.
- Levron, Jacques (1931). "Une lettre privée du XVe siècle". Bibliothèque de l'École des chartes (in French). 92: 247-249.
- Setton, Kenneth M. (1984). The Papacy and the Levant, 1204-1571. Vol. IV. The American Philosophical Society.
