= Brossard (surname) =

Brossard is a surname. Notable people with the surname include:

- Chandler Brossard (1922–1993), American novelist, writer, editor, and teacher
- Emma Brossard (1928–2007), American professor of politics and government and noted expert on the Venezuelan oil industry
- Geneviève Brossard de Beaulieu (fl. c. 1770–1815), French painter
- Georges Brossard (born 1940), Canadian entomologist
- Nicole Brossard (born 1943), French Canadian formalist poet and novelist
- Sébastien de Brossard (1655–1730), French composer

Fictional characters:

- Pierre Brossard, a fictional character in the novel The Statement, by Brian Moore, and the film adaptation

== See also ==
- Sébastien de Brossard (1655–1730), French music theorist and baroque composer
