= Jean IV de Brosse =

French governor, military commander and courtier

- Comte de Penthièvre; Duc d'Étampes; Duc de Chevreuse
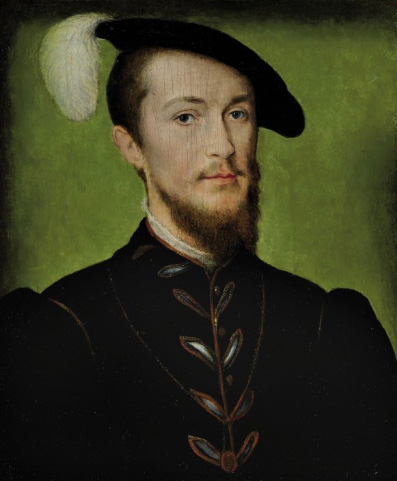
- Portrait by Corneille de Lyon
- Born: 1505; Lamballe, Brittany, France
- Died: 1565 (aged 59–60)
- Noble family: Brosse
- Spouse: Anne de Pisseleu d'Heilly
- Father: René de Brosse
- Mother: Jeanne de Commines

Jean IV de Brosse, duc d'Étampes et Chevreuse, comte de Penthièvre (1505 in Lamballe – 31 January 1565) was a French governor, military commander and courtier. The son of René de Brosse and member of a prominent Breton family that had been disgraced during the War of the Public Weal Étampes found himself pushed forward into prominence when king François I arranged a marriage between the count and his mistress Anne de Pisseleu d'Heilly. To secure his consent to this political arrangement François created for the couple the Duchy of Étampes and restored effective control of the County of Penthièvre to his family, it having been confiscated after their disgrace. In 1543 his position in Normandy, already expansive was supplemented still further with his appointment as governor of the province. To assist him in governance his nephew Martigues acted as lieutenant-general.

The death of François was a political blow to Étampes. Henri II and his mistress Diane de Poitiers despised his father's mistress, and the couple were compelled to hand over the duchy to Diane. In 1555 he was coerced into selling the Duchy of Chevreuse which he held to the Cardinal of Lorraine. Étampes did not completely fade from favour however, and when Henri II went about formally integrating Brittany into the kingdom of France in 1554, Étampes was assured of his families rights to the county of Penthièvre in return for ceding any rights he might have to the duchy itself.

In 1559 Henri in turn died unexpectedly. He was succeeded by the young François II under the stewardship of the Guise. Catherine de Medici who had been sidelined during the reign of her husband used his death to banish Diane from the court, and as a result Étampes found himself restored to his duchy. Opposition to the Guise government boiled over during the Conspiracy of Amboise, Étampes sought to suppress sedition in his governorship, passing on seditious material to the court. Étampes was frustrated by the rapidly evolving and sometimes contradictory royal policy on religion as the country descended towards the French Wars of Religion, noting bitterly that he was receiving contradictory instructions from the Lieutenant-General of the kingdom and the Constable. He fought for the crown in the first war of religion, but was focused on affairs inside his governate, expelling the Protestants from Nantes in July. In 1564 he was granted the right to have his governorship inherited by his nephew Martigues rather than reverting to the crown for the selection of his successor. He died on 31 January 1565.

== Early life and family ==
Jean IV de Brosse was the son of René de Brosse and Jeanne de Commines (daughter of Philippe de Commines).

After the death of his father at the Battle of Pavia, he succeeded him as nominal Count of Penthièvre.

== Reign of François I ==
In 1533, on François I's instruction he married Anne de Pisseleu d'Heilly, the mistress of the king, and was shortly thereafter created Count, then Duke of Étampes. this marriage also re-secured for his family the County of Penthièvre that had been seized from them following their involvement in the League of the Public Weal as a reward for facilitating the king access to his mistress. However, he was greatly impoverished by the expenditures necessary to maintain their position at court. In 1543 he was appointed governor of Brittany, to assist him in administering the province, his nephew Martigues was chosen as his lieutenant-general, handling many of the military affairs of the territory.

== Reign of Henri II ==
With the death of François I, the antipathy of Diane de Poitiers compelled Étampes to retreat to Brittany and further she obtained his duchy of Étampes. During the early reign of Henri II Étampes maintained his position in the conseil des parties a looser less important council outside the conseil privé. In 1554 Henri pursued the formal annexation of Brittany into France through the Parlement of the region. In return for ceding any rights he might have to be duke of Brittany, Étampes was guaranteed his rights over the county of Penthièvre the following year. In 1555 Étampes and his wife were dispossessed of the duchy of Chevreuse, compelled to sell it and the lands of Meudon to Charles, Cardinal of Lorraine in return for 50,000 écus.

== Reign of François II ==
On the death of king Henri II, the Guise, to whom Étampes had ceded Chevreuse, took charge of the young François II. There was considerable opposition to their administration that coalesced into the Conspiracy of Amboise. This attempt to seize the king failed, and the conspiracy was broken as it tried to storm the castle of Amboise. Nevertheless, many of the conspirators were not present, including the seigneur de Maligny, who the Guise believed was taking refuge in Brittany. They urged Étampes in his capacity as governor of the province to bring him to court, so that they might bring him to justice. Étampes was however unable to locate him, and Maligny would go on to be involved in a conspiracy in Lyon later the same year. In the month following the events in Lyon, Étampes reported to the Guisard government on seditious placards, emboldened by the conspiracies of the previous months, that he had found in Nantes.

== Reign of Charles IX ==
=== Crisis of authority ===
Due to the weakness of the central administration as the religious crisis deepened, the crown was compelled to ask Étampes to publicly offer his support to the regency, to demonstrate that leading magnates were still loyal. He in turn asked for letters from the court demonstrating their favour to him, so that he might show them to his subordinates in the province to 'give them courage.' In early 1561 he was informed that the court no longer wished for him to apprehend Protestants who were not under arms and only assembling peacefully in small numbers. This was despite the continued illegality of Protestantism until 1562. The continually evolving religious policy frustrated him, and he wrote angrily to Antoine of Navarre complaining that to many in his province, the changing methods of his handling of religion appeared like a manifestation of his personal prejudices rather than royal policy. By 1562 the policy was beyond rapidly evolving and had become contradictory. Étampes despaired as to how he was to govern Nantes, noting that the lieutenant-general had asked him to confiscate arms from the Protestants but do no more, while the Constable had asked him to drive the Protestants from his province.

=== First war of religion ===
During the first war of religion, Étampes fought for the crown, and was responsible for raising troops in Normandy to assist the effort. In July however he was instructed by the crown to disband some of the units he had raised as a measure of economy. Étampes protested to Navarre the lieutenant-general of the kingdom in disgust, warning that if he was no longer responsible for the troops that they would seek their pay from the rebels instead. The crown urged him to seize church plate to help reduce the costs of the war, however Étampes was unenthused by the idea, noting that particularly in south Brittany this would be met by considerable resistance from the populace. He proposed instead calling the provincial estates to solve the revenue issue, the crown refused but permitted him to call diocese assemblies, through which he raised taxes to pay his garrisons. In the same month he undertook the expulsion of Protestants from the city of Nantes, and sequestered tax receipts and ignored other orders from court, writing bitterly to the regent about his situation and his difficulties ensuring order.

=== Succession ===
Ėtampes was granted the right in 1564, upon his death, to resign his governorship of Brittany in favour of his nephew Martigues, who would govern the province until his own death in 1569. This practice had been very rare during the reign of François I, but was proliferating by the reign of Charles IX, with governors being successful at keeping posts within their families at a far higher frequency. Étampes died on 31 January 1565.

== Sources ==
- Baumgartner, Frederic (1988). Henry II: King of France 1547-1559. Duke University Press.
- Benedict, Philip (2020). Season of Conspiracy: Calvin, the French Reformed Churches and Protestant Plotting in the Reign of Francis II. American Philosophical Society Press.
- Durot, Éric (2012). François de Lorraine, duc de Guise entre Dieu et le Roi. Classiques Garnier.
- Harding, Robert (1978). Anatomy of a Power Elite. Yale University Press. ISBN 0300022026.
- Thompson, James (1909). The Wars of Religion in France 1559-1576: The Huguenots, Catherine de Medici and Philip II. Chicago University Press.
- Knecht, R.J. (2001). The Rise and Fall of Renaissance France, 1483-1610. Blackwell Publishers.
- Knecht, Robert (1994). Renaissance Warrior and Patron: The Reign of Francis I. Cambridge University Press.
- Wood, James (2002). The Kings Army: Warfare, Soldiers and Society during the Wars of Religion in France, 1562-1576. Cambridge University Press.

French nobility
Preceded by René	Comte de Penthièvre; 1525–1564	Succeeded by Sebastian
Preceded by Jean	Comte d'Étampes; 1534–1536	Succeeded by elevated to Duchy
Preceded by elevated from County	Duc d'Étampes; 1536–1553	Succeeded by Diane
Preceded by elevated from Barony	Duc de Chevreuse; 1545–1555	Succeeded by Charles I
Preceded by Diane	Duc d'Étampes; 1562–1564	Succeeded by to royal domain
