= Renescure =

- Commune
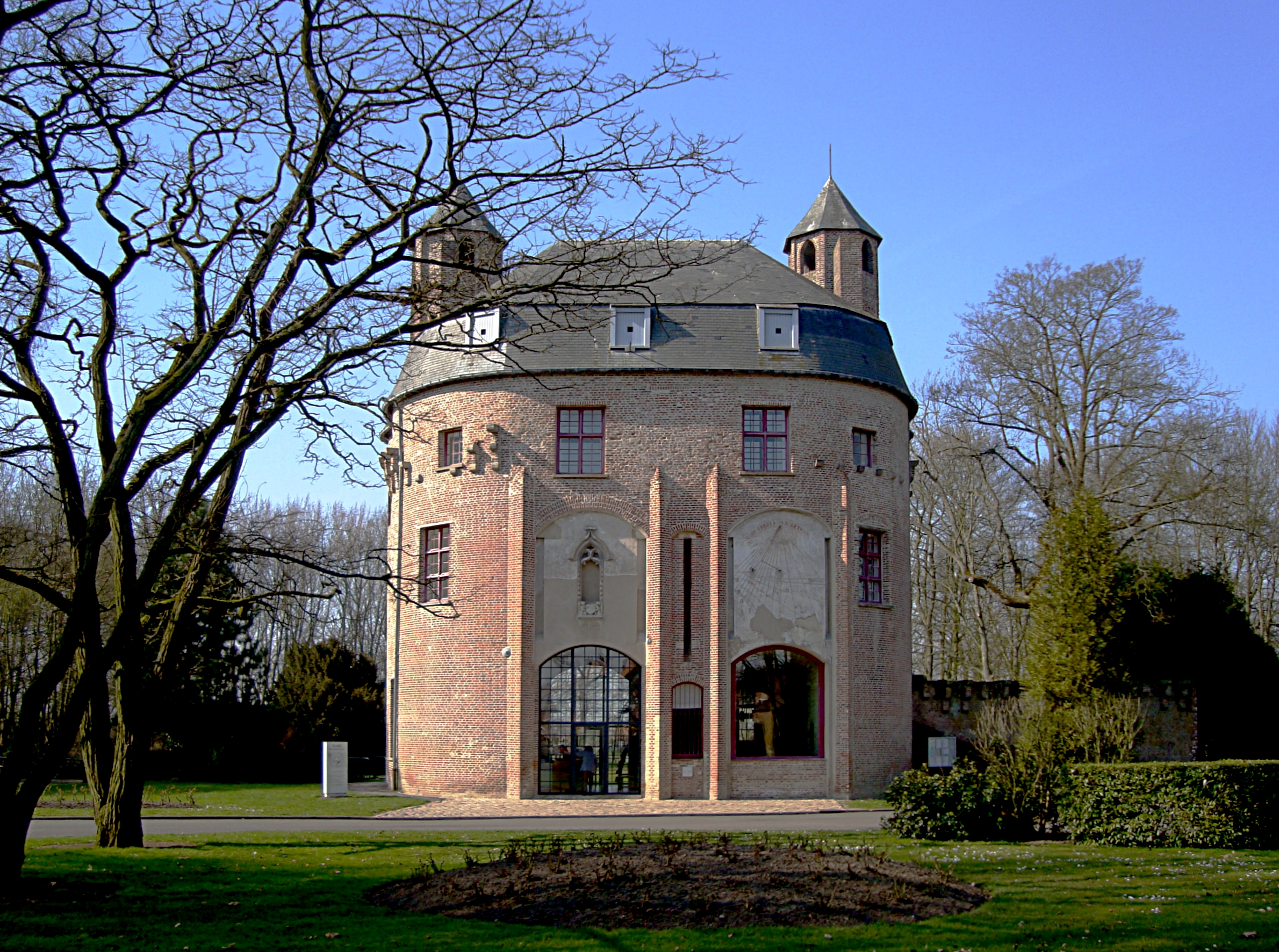
- The town hall in Renescure

- Coat of arms
- Location of Renescure
- Location within France Location within Hauts-de-France
- Coordinates: 50°43′38″N 2°22′10″E
- Country: France
- Region: Hauts-de-France
- Department: Nord
- Arrondissement: Dunkerque
- Canton: Hazebrouck
- Intercommunality: CA Cœur de Flandre

Government
  - Mayor (2020–2026): Frédéric Jude
- Area^{1}: 18.93 km^{2} (7.31 sq mi)
- Elevation: 30 m (98 ft)
- Highest elevation: 74 m (243 ft)
- Lowest elevation: 17 m (56 ft)
- Population (2023): 2,113
  - Density: 111.6/km^{2} (289.1/sq mi)
- Demonym: Renescurois (es)
- Time zone: UTC+01:00 (CET)
  - Summer (DST): UTC+02:00 (CEST)
- INSEE/Postal code: 59497 /59173
- ^{1} French Land Register data, which excludes lakes, ponds, glaciers > 1 km^{2} (0.386 sq mi or 247 acres) and river estuaries.

Renescure (French pronunciation: [ʁənɛskyʁ]; Dutch: Ruisscheure) is a commune in the Nord department in northern France.

Philippe de Commines (1447–1511) was a writer and diplomat in the courts of Burgundy and France. He was born in Renescure which was then in the county of Flanders.

It is the village where Bonduelle S.A. opened its first cannery.

== Population ==
Historical population
Year	Pop.	±% p.a.
1968	1,928	—
1975	2,071	+1.03%
1982	2,115	+0.30%
1990	2,221	+0.61%
1999	2,086	−0.69%
2007	2,031	−0.33%
2012	2,085	+0.53%
2017	2,080	−0.05%
2023	2,113	+0.26%
Source: INSEE

== Heraldry ==
Arms of Renescure	The arms of Renescure are blazoned : Quarterly 1&4: Argent, an anchor sable; 2&3: Or, in saltire 5 trefois vert.

== See also ==
- Communes of the Nord department
