= Counts and dukes of Étampes =

This is a list of the Counts and Dukes of Étampes, a French fief.

== Counts of Étampes ==
- Charles d'Évreux 1327–1336
- Louis I d'Évreux 1336–1400
- John, Duke of Berry 1400–1416
- royal domain
- Richard de Dreux 1421–1438
- royal domain
- John II, Count of Nevers 1442–1465
- Francis II, Duke of Brittany 1465–1478
- John of Foix 1478–1500
- Gaston de Foix 1500–1512
- Anna, Duchess of Brittany 1512–1514
- Claude of France 1514–1515
- Artus Gouffier 1515–1519
- Claude of France 1519–1524
- royal domain
- Jean de La Barre 1526–1534
- Jean IV de Brosse 1534–1536

== Dukes of Étampes ==
- Jean IV de Brosse 1536–1553
- Diane de Poitiers 1553–1562
- Jean IV de Brosse 1562–1564
- royal domain
- John Casimir, Count of the Rhenish Palatinate 1576–1577
- royal domain

=== Bourbon-Vendôme ===
- Gabrielle d'Estrées 1598–1599
- César, duc de Vendôme 1599–1665
- Louis, duc de Vendôme 1665–1669
- Louis Joseph, duc de Vendôme 1669–1712

=== House of Condé and Conti ===
- Marie Anne de Bourbon 1712–1718 - duchesse of vendôme - wife of above
- Louise Élisabeth de Bourbon 1718–1752 - princesse de Conti - niece of the above
- Louise Henriette de Bourbon 1752–1759 - duchesse d'Orléans - daughter of the above

=== House of Orléans ===
- Louis Philippe II, Duke of Orléans 1759–1792 - son of the above
