= Philippe, Duke of Vendôme =

Grand prior of France (1655–1727)

Philippe
- Grand prior of France
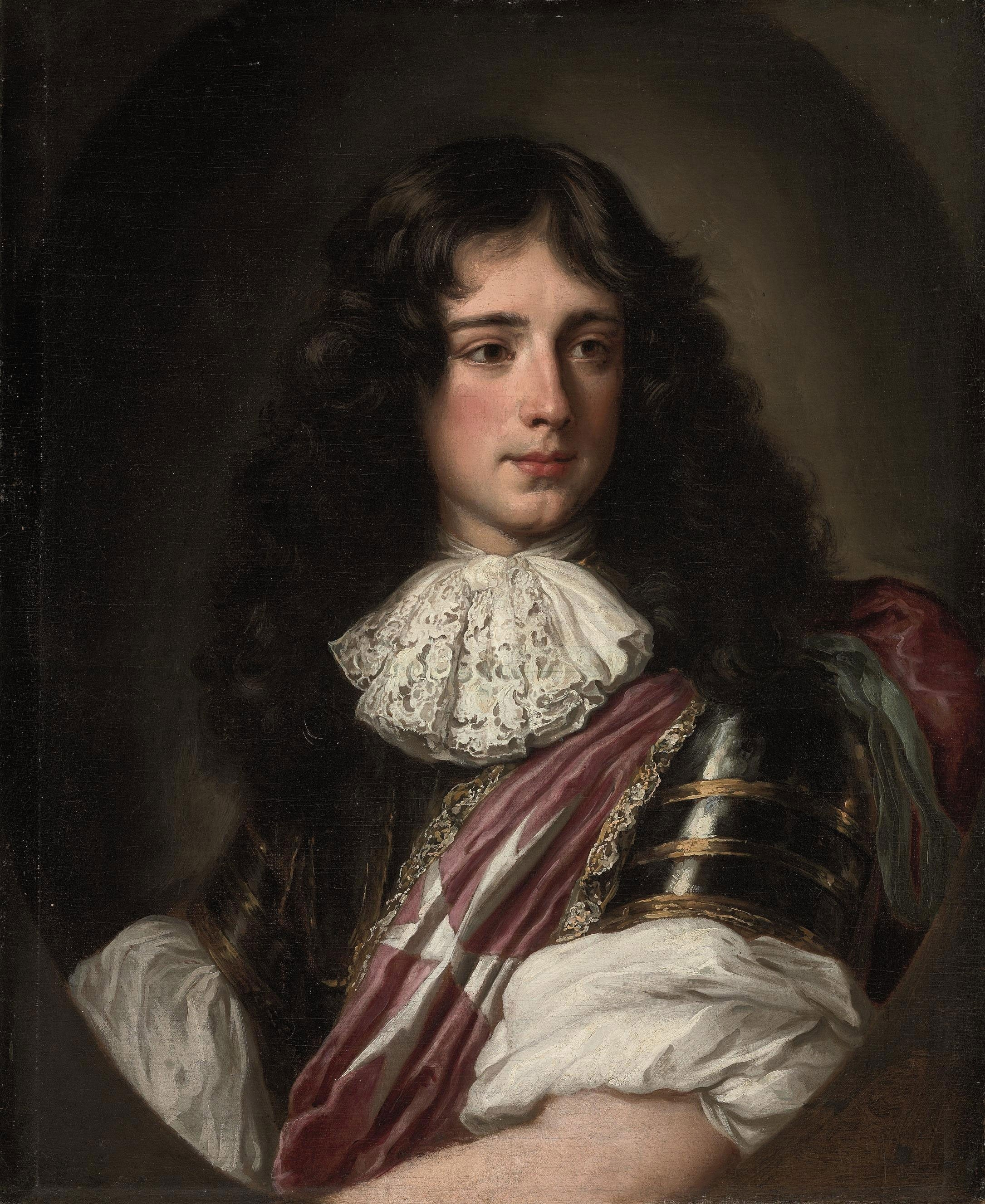
- As a young man (Note: Portrait of Philippe de Vendôme as a young man by Jacob Ferdinand Voet)
- Born: 23 August 1655; Paris, France
- Died: 24 January 1727 (aged 71); Paris, France
- Father: Louis de Bourbon
- Mother: Laura Mancini

Philippe, Grand Prior of Vendôme (1655–1727) was a French general, a grand prior of France in the Order of Malta, as well as an epicurian and a libertine.

He fought for Louis XIV from 1669, at the Siege of Candia, to 1705, at the Battle of Cassano, where he failed to join his brother Louis Joseph, Duke of Vendôme in battle. He fell in disgrace and left the French army. Being grand prior he hurried to Malta to defend it in 1715, but the Turks never came.

He spent time in Italy and was banned to Lyon when he returned. After Louis XIV's death the regent allowed him back to Paris and the court. The Grand Prior hosted a literary, philosophical, and libertine circle, known as the Temple Society, of which young Voltaire was a member. In 1719 he sold his office of Grand Prior and died unmarried in Paris in 1727.

Family tree

Phillippe de Vendôme with parents and other selected relatives. (Note: This family tree is derived from written genealogies of the Vendômes (Anselme 1726, pp. 196–201).) He never married.

Henri IV; 1553–1610	Gabrielle d'Estrées; 1573–1599
César; 1st Duke; 1594–1665 illegitimate	Françoise de Lorraine; 1592–1669
Louis; 2nd Duke; 1612–1667	Laura; Mancini; 1636–1657	François de Beaufort; 1616–1669
Louis Joseph; 3rd Duke; 1621–1707	Philippe; 1655–1727

Legend

XXX	Subject of the article	XXX	Dukes of Vendôme	XXX	King of France

== Birth and origins ==
Philippe was born on 23 August 1655 in Paris and baptised together with his elder brother Louis Joseph in the Sainte Chapelle of the Château de Vincennes on 17 October 1656 by Cardinal Antonio Barberini. Philippe was the younger of the two sons of Louis, Duke of Vendôme, and his wife Laura Mancini.

His father was, at the time of his birth, styled duke of Mercœur, while his grandfather César was duke of Vendôme. César was an illegitimate son of Henri IV, who had created the second House of Bourbon-Vendôme for him in 1598.

His mother was Italian, the eldest daughter of Baron Lorenzo Mancini and his wife Girolama, a sister of Cardinal Mazarin, chief minister of France. She was one of the Mazarinettes, as the cardinal's nieces were called. Philippe's parents had married in 1651.

== Youth and Candia ==
Philippe's mother died in 1657, when he was still an infant. In 1661, aged seven, he became commendatory abbot of the Trinity of Vendôme. Cardinal Mazarin died in March 1661, and Louis XIV, much less favourable to the Vendômes, started to rule by himself.

Philippe's grandfather César died in 1665. His father succeeded as the 2nd duke of Vendôme. His brother became duke of Mercœur. The brothers inherited the Hôtel de Vendôme in Paris where César had lived. They sold it to Louis XIV for 666,000 livres. Louvois had it demolished to create a royal square, the present Place Vendôme.

In 1666 Philippe joined the Knights of Malta, becoming the chevalier de Vendôme. In 1667 his father, who had not remarried after Laura's death, was created Cardinal of Vendôme.

In 1669, aged 14, the Chevalier followed his uncle François de Beaufort in the French expedition to Crete. Louis XIV wanted to please Pope Clement IX by helping the Venetians in the Siege of Candia. Beaufort was admiral and commanded the sailing vessels, while Vivonne commanded the galleys. The Chevalier fought in the disastrous sally undertaken by the French on 25 June, shortly after their arrival, in which his uncle went missing.

On 6 August 1669, while the Chevalier was on Crete, his father died in France and his brother succeeded as 3rd duke of Vendôme.

The French at Candia were running out of resources and planned to leave. At the eve of their departure, the Chevalier organised a parley in an effort to find out what had happened to his uncle, but the Turks said they did not know. (Note: Courcelles maintains that the Turks knew what happened, as the Grand Vizier, Achmed Köprülü, had his uncle's head cut off and sent to Constantinople (Courcelles 1823, p. 403), but Bigge reports that apparently the Turks showed bags full of heads to a French negotiator who could not find Beaufort's among them (Bigge 1899, p. .)) The French left Crete on 31 August..

In 1676 the Chevalier seduced Isabelle de Ludres, who had an affair with Louis XIV.

== Dutch war ==
The Franco-Dutch War (1672–1678) started with France attacking the Netherlands. In June the Chevalier fought under Louis, Grand Condé, at the Crossing of the Rhine, where he swam through the river and captured two Dutch flags. In 1673 he was at the Siege of Maastricht under Louis XIV and Vauban. In 1674 he fought under Turenne against Imperial troops at Sinsheim, Germany. Turenne was killed in 1675.

The Chevalier spent the remainder of the war in the Spanish Netherlands under Marshal Luxembourg in at least five successful sieges. In April 1676 he fought at the siege of Condé. In 1677 the Chevalier was at the sieges of Valenciennes, captured in March, and Cambrai, captured in April. In 1678 he fought at the sieges of Ghent, 1 to 9 March, and Ypres, 18 to 25 March. Except Ghent, these places became part of Vauban's Pré carré. The war ended with the Treaties of Nijmegen. France signed peace with the Dutch in August 1678 and with Spain in September.

== First interwar ==
The Chevalier became grand prior of France end of April 1678 succeeding Henry d'Estampes de Valencay. The pope had promised him the succession. The grand prior's seat was the Grand Prior's Palace at the Temple in Paris. (Note: The grand prior's palace inhabited by Vendôme had been built 1665 to 1666 by Pierre Delisle-Mansart for Jacques de Souvré. It passed to Vendôme more or less unchanged. The courtyard, in form of a horseshoe was surrounded by a colonnade, during Vendôme's time. The columns were torne down in 1720 when the Chevalier d'Orléans became grand prior. The entire building is demolished in 1853.) The two brothers moved in together. His friend Chaulieu entered into their service as secretary and financial adviser, probably in 1680.

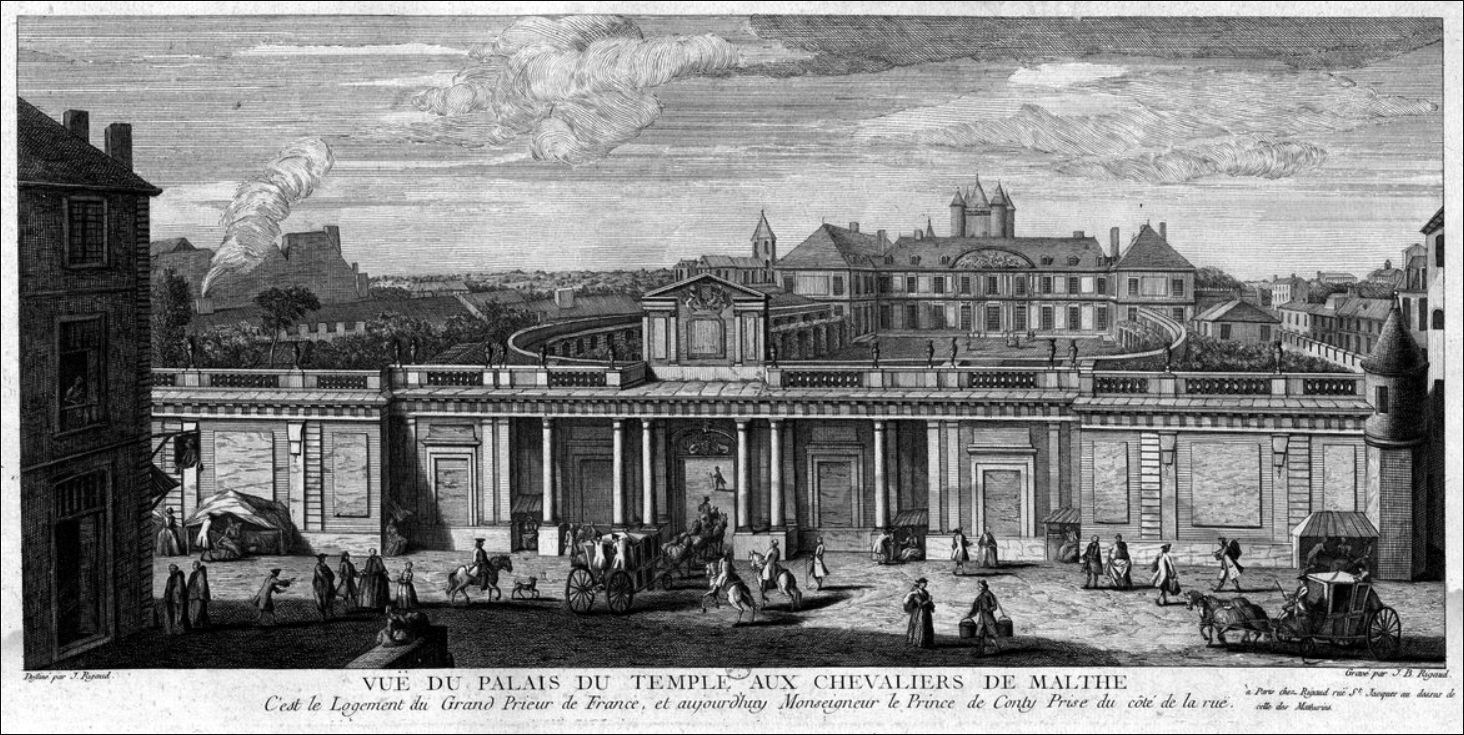
Grand Prior's Palace at the Temple, Paris (Note: The picture was drawn by Jacques Rigaud and engraved by Jean Baptiste Rigaud. It is undated but must have been completed after 1649, when Louis Francois, Prince of Conti became grand prior, and before Jacques's death in 1754. The image looks south-east and shows the entrance on Rue du Temple with the courtyard and the house behind it. The top of the medieval Temple Tower looms behind its roof.)

A lover of literature, poetry, food, and drink, the Grand Prior, helped by Chaulieu, offered suppers at the Temple, where the members of the Temple Society met. The young Voltaire was one of them.

In 1683 the Grand Prior spent some time at the English court, where he seduced Louise de Kérouaille, Duchess of Portsmouth, mistress of Charles II of England.

== Nine Years' War ==
At the beginning of the Nine Years' War (1688–1697), also known as the "War of the Grand Alliance" or the "War of the League of Augsburg", the Grand Prior served in Flanders. In 1690 he fought at the victorious Battle of Fleurus as a colonel under Luxembourg. On 7 March 1691 he was promoted marechal de camp. He fought together with his brother at the Siege of Mons, from 15 March to April 1691. In September he took part in the cavalry attack on the Dutch rear-guard at Leuze. In 1692 he was at the Siege of Namur in June and the Battle of Steenkerke in August. In March 1693 he was promoted lieutenant general. The Grand Prior and his brother were jealous of Conti. All three had excelled at Steenkerk, but Luxembourg singled out Conti as winner.

In April 1693 the brothers were transferred to Italy to serve under Catinat. In October they fought the Savoyards at Marsaglia, where the Grand Prior was dangerously wounded. In 1694 Catinat sent the brothers to Provence. In 1695 Vendôme was transferred to Catalonia, whereas the Grand Prior stepped into his place and fought at the siege of Nice under Catinat.

In 1697 the Grand Prior joined his brother in Spain, where he fought under him at the Siege of Barcelona. The Treaty of Ryswick between France and Spain on 20 September ended the fighting.

== Second interwar ==
In 1698 the Grand Prior quarrelled with Conti over a card game. Louis XIV sided with Conti and sent the prior to the Bastille.

== Spanish Succession ==
The War of the Spanish Succession (1701–1714) started in northern Italy, where Prince Eugen, fighting for the Joseph I, Holy Roman Emperor, defeated French and Savoyard troops under Catinat at Carpi in July 1701. Catinat was replaced with Villeroy, who was likewise defeated at Chiari in September. Catinat, who had served under Villeroy at Chiari, was transferred to the Rhine, where the Grand Prior served under him in 1702. When Eugene took Villeroy prisoner in January 1702 at Cremona, Louis XIV appointed the Duke of Vendôme, the Grand Prior's brother, commander-in-chief in Italy. Vendôme rushed to Italy, arriving at Cremona in March.

The Duke of Maine persuaded the king to let the Grand Prior join his brother in Italy, where he arrived shortly before May 1703. In June Victor Amadeus II, Duke of Savoy, switched sides. In 1704 Vendôme fought the Duke of Savoy in Piedmont while the Grand Prior, leading a separate army in Lombardy, prevented Prince Eugene from moving west to join up with the Duke of Savoy.

In January 1705 the Grand Prior defeated the Imperials at Castiglione. He also kept Eugene away from the south where the French besieged Mirandola, which fell on 10 March. In May the Grand Prior held a line along the rivers Chiese and Mincio, and the Lake Garda. In May Vendome came east and the two brothers met on the 19th on the Mincio, but Vendôme soon returned to Piedmont.

In July Vendôme left Piedmont to La Feuillade and joined his brother at Ombriano, taking over the command. By August 1705 the French had been pushed back from the Mincio River to the Adda River. His brother sent him to Rivolta to pursue Prince Eugene who had feigned a retreat but then bypassed the Grand Prior and attacked his brother at Cassano. The Grand Prior stayed where he was and did not join his brother having received no order to do so. He was severely criticised by his brother and fell in disgrace at the court. He went to Paris and tried to see the king at Versailles but was not admitted. By September he had lost all employment in the French Army.

== Later life ==
The Grand Prior lived at Genoa with his cousin Marie Charlotte de La Porte de La Meilleraye. He then established himself in Rome, where he met the painter Jean Raoux, who had come to Rome in 1704. He met him again in Venice, where he found him sick and cared for him. They went back together to Rome.

In 1708 Michel Chamillart spoke to the king in his favour. Louis allowed him to return to France but forbade him Paris and the court. In October 1710 while travelling in Switzerland, he was held hostage in Chur, by Thomas Masner, whose son was held in France. The Grand Prior was released in 1711, but the king still forbade him to attend the court or come to Paris.

His brother, the duke of Vendôme, died in 1712. As he was married but childless, Louis XIV annexed the duchy into the royal domain, claiming that the Grand Prior's vows as Maltese knight excluded him from the succession. The Grand Prior nevertheless now called himself duke. In 1713 he returned to Rome together with Jean Raoux from whom he commanded the four ages of man. In 1714 they are back and the Grand Prior houses Raoux at the Temple, where he finished the four paintings of the cycle. (Note: One of the four paintings, "La Vieillesse" (old age) has been sold recently and is signed "ft. par. J. Raoux a Rome 1714")

At the end of January 1715, the grand master, Ramon Perellós, asked his knights to come to defend Malta as a Turkish attack seemed imminent. The Grand Prior, still at Lyon, asked Louis XIV whether he could come and say good-bye before leaving. The king refused but gave him permission to travel to Malta. The Grand Prior reached Malta in April. The grand master appointed him commander-in-chief of all the troops of the order. However, the attack never came. In October he was back in France, where his friend Jean-Baptiste Rousseau celebrated him by an ode in the style of Horace. See the following extract:

Le Rhin, le Pô, l'Èbre, la Meuse
Tour à tour ont vu ses exploits,

The Rhine, the Po, the Ebro, the Meuse
One by one, have seen his achievements,

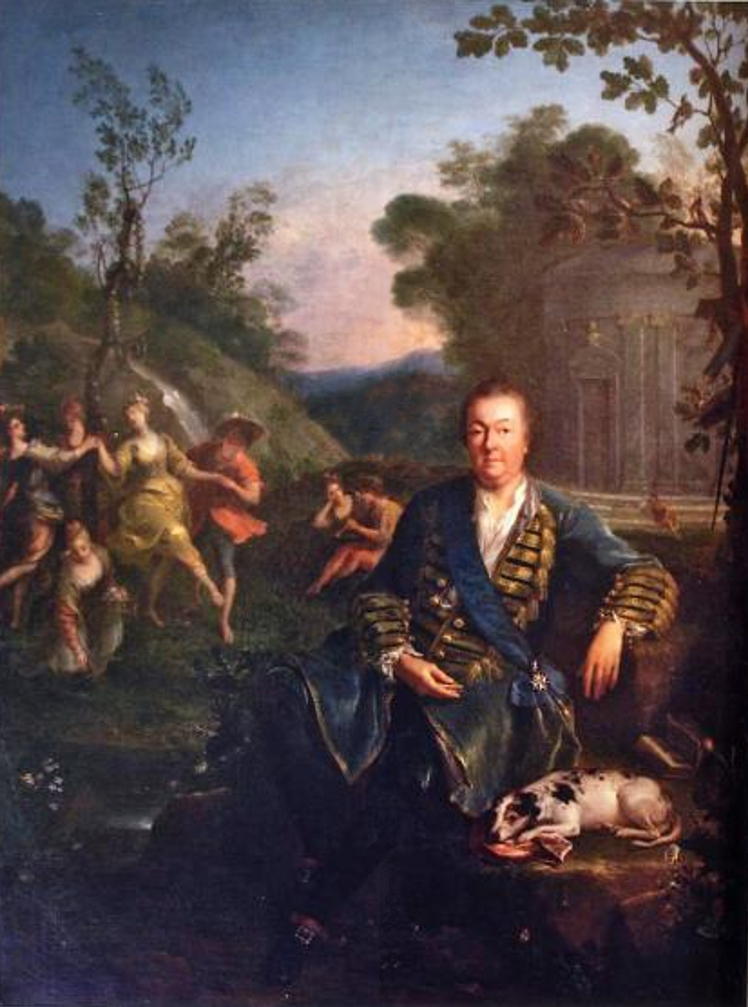
Sixty-nine years old (Note: Portrait by Jean Raoux (1724) belonging to the Louvre but permanently lent to the Musée Fabre at Montpellier. It shows the Chevalier de Vendôme bidding good-bye to his military career (arms hung at the tree on the right behind him) and to the pleasures of life (symbolised by the dancers) as he turns to study and méditation (open book at his left above the dog).)

Louis XIV died in September 1715. Louis XV was five years old. The regency was assumed by Philippe II, Duke of Orléans, who admired the Grand Prior. He revoked the Grand Prior's banishment. The Grand Prior moved back into his palace at the Temple and was admitted to the court. At the Temple he again presided the suppers of the Temple Society. In 1717 Voltaire wrote an epitre dedicated to him. In the following extract he declares himself a member of the Temple Society:

Je sais que vous avez l’honneur,
Me dit-il, d'être des orgies
De certain aimable prieur,

I know that you have the honour,
He told me, to attend the orgies
Of a certain kind prior,

In 1719 he sold his office of grand prior to the Chevalier d'Orléans, an illegitimate son of the regent. He was paid in cash and shares of the Mississippi Company. Having sold his office, he became once more Chevalier de Vendôme. He also had to leave the Temple and moved into a townhouse in the Rue de Varenne. Jean Raoux moved with him. His friend Chaulieu died in 1720.

He planned to renounce his vows and marry but was in his sixties and could not find a suitable wife. In 1724 Raoux painted his portrait as an old man turning his back on military glory and love.

== Death and timeline ==
The Chevalier died unmarried on 24 January 1727 at his townhouse in the rue de Varenne. His body was brought to the Temple before being buried in the church of the Chartreuse de Paris. With him died the name of Vendôme.

Timeline
Italics for historical background.
Age	Date	Event
0	23 Aug 1655	Born in Paris
1	8 Feb 1657	Mother died aged 21 in Paris
5	9 Mar 1661	Cardinal Mazarin died.
10	22 Oct 1665	Grandfather César died in Paris
10–11	1666	Joined the Order of Malta
13	5 Jun 1669	Departed for Crete with his uncle
13	6 Aug 1669	Father died
14	31 Aug 1669	Left Crete
14	5 Sep 1669	Candia surrendered to the Turks
22	Apr 1678	Became grand prior of France
23–24	26 Jan 1679	Treaties of Nijmegen ended the Franco-Dutch War between France and the Empire.
34–35	1690	Wignacourt succeeds to Carafa as grand master.
34	1 Jul 1690	Fought at the Battle of Fleurus (1690)
34	30 Mar 1693	Promoted Lieutenant General
41–42	1697	Ramon Perellós succeeds to Wignacourt as grand master.
49	16 Aug 1705	Criticised for his behaviour at the Battle of Cassano
56	11 Jun 1712	Brother died in Spain
57	11 Apr 1713	Peace of Utrecht ended the War of the Spanish Succession
59	7 Apr 1715	Arrived at Malta to defend it
60	1 Sep 1715	Death of Louis XIV; Regency until the majority of Louis XV
63	7 Apr 1719	Sold his office as grand prior
71	20 Apr 1719	Died in Paris

== Sources ==
- Anselme (1726). Histoire généalogique et chronologique de la maison royale de France [Genealogical and Chronological History of the Royal House of France] (in French). Vol. Tome premier (Troisième édition ed.). Paris: Compagnie des libraires associez. – House of France (for him and his brother Louis-Joseph)
- Anselme (1730). Histoire généalogique et chronologique de la maison royale de France [Genealogical and Chronological History of the Royal House of France] (in French). Vol. Tome cinquième (Troisième édition ed.). Paris: Compagnie des libraires associez. OCLC 831196124. – Dukes
- Anselme (1733). Histoire généalogique ey chronologique de la maison royale de France [Genealogical and Chronological History of the Royal House of France] (in French). Vol. Tome huitième (Troisième édition ed.). Paris: Compagnie des libraires associez. – Marshals of France (for Henry d'Estampes)
- Bardakçi, Öskan; Pugnière, François (2008). "Chapter V". La dernière croisade: Les Français et la guerre de Candie, 1669 (in French). Presses Universitaires de Rennes. ISBN 978-2-75350642-8.
- Benezit, ed. (2006). "Raoux, Jean". Benezit Dictionary of Artists. Vol. 11. Paris: Gründ. pp. 671–672. ISBN 2-7000-3070-2. – Pinchon to Rouck
- Bigge (1899). "Der Kampf um Candia in den Jahren 1667–1669" [The fight for Candia in the years 1667–1669]. Kriegsgeschichtliche Einzelschriften (in German). Heft 26.
- Chisholm, Hugh, ed. (1910). "Chaulieu, Guillaume Amfrye de (1639–1720)" . Encyclopædia Britannica. Vol. VI (11th ed.). Cambridge University Press. p. 17.
- Courcelles (1823). Dictionnaire historique et biographique des généraux français [Historic and Biographic Dictionary of French Generals] (in French). Vol. Tome neuvième. Paris: chez l'auteur. – Riv to Z & index
- Curzon, Henri de (1888). La maison du Temple de Paris [The House of the Temple in Paris] (in French). Paris: Hachette. OCLC 761333765.
- Dangeau (1858a). Conches, Feuillet de (ed.). Journal du marquis de Dangeau [Diary of the Marquess of Dangeau] (in French). Vol. Tome Quatorzième. Paris: Firmin Didot Frères. OCLC 310446765. – 1711 to 1713
- Dangeau (1858b). Conches, Feuillet de (ed.). Journal du marquis de Dangeau [Diary of the Marquess of Dangeau] (in French). Vol. Tome Quinzième. Paris: Firmin Didot Frères. OCLC 310446765. – 1713 to 1715
- Dangeau (1859). Conches, Feuillet de (ed.). Journal du marquis de Dangeau [Diary of the Marquess of Dangeau] (in French). Vol. Tome Seizième. Paris: Firmin Didot Frères. OCLC 310446765. – 1715 to 1716
- Dezallier d'Argenville, A. J. (1752). Abbrégé de la vie des plus fameux peintres [A compendium of the lives of the most famous peinters] (in French). Vol. Troizième partie. Paris: De Bure l'ainé.
- Goubert, Pierre (1984). Initiation à l'histoire de la France [Initiation to the History of France] (in French). Paris: Fayard-Tallandier. ISBN 978-2-235-01484-7. – (for timeline)
- Hassall, Arthur (1903). Mazarin. New York: MacMillan and Co. OCLC 1847291.
- La Chenaye-Desbois (1876). Dictionnaire de la noblesse [Dictionary of Nobility] (in French). Vol. Tome dix-neuvième (3rd ed.). Paris: Schlesinger Frères. OCLC 797014713. – TIL to ZUR (for duchy of Vendôme)
- La Roque, Louis de (1891). Catalogue des chevaliers de Malte [Catalogue of the knights of Malta] (in French). Paris: Desaide. OCLC 562124827.
- Lynn, John A. (1999). The Wars of Louis XIV 1667–1714. Harlow, England: Longman. ISBN 978-0-582-05629-9.
- Michaud junior (1854). "Vendôme (Philippe de)". In Michaud, Louis Gabriel (ed.). Biographie universelle ancienne et moderne (in French). Vol. Tome quarante-trois (Nouvelle ed.). Paris: Madame C. Desplaces. p. 108. OCLC 654775774.
- Miller, Peggy (1971). James: Old Pretender. Lanham MD: St. Martin's Press. ISBN 9780049230569.
- Orr, Clarissa Campbell, ed. (2004). Queenship in Europe 1660-1815: The Role of the Consort. Cambridge University Press. ISBN 9780521814225.
- Pétigny, J. de (1882). Histoire archéologique du Vendômois [Archeological History of the town and country of Vendôme] (in French) (Revue et corrigée ed.). Vendome: Vendome–Blois toutes les librairies. OCLC 680457204.
- Pirenne, H. (1920). Histoire de Belgique (in French). Vol. V. Brussels: Henri Lamertin. OCLC 1045995721. – 1648 to 1792
- Quincy (1726a). Histoire militaire du règne de Louis le Grand [Military History of the Reign of Louis the Great] (in French). Vol. I. Paris: Denis Mariette. OCLC 23619104. – 1643 to 1681
- Quincy (1726b). Histoire militaire du règne de Louis le Grand [Military History of the Reign of Louis the Great] (in French). Vol. II. Paris: Denis Mariette. OCLC 23619104. – 1681 to 1693
- Quincy (1726c). Histoire militaire du règne de Louis le Grand [Military History of the Reign of Louis the Great] (in French). Vol. III. Paris: Denis Mariette. OCLC 312096140. – 1694 to 1702
- Quincy (1726d). Histoire militaire du règne de Louis le Grand [Military History of the Reign of Louis the Great] (in French). Vol. IV. Paris: Denis Mariette. OCLC 23619104. – 1703 to 1705
- Rousseau, J. B. (1851). Œuvres choisies de J. B. Rousseau [Selected works of J. B. Rousseau] (in French). Paris: Jacques Lecoffre et Cie. OCLC 458764838.
- Saint-Germain, Jacques (1950). "Comment fut construite la Place de Vendôme" [How the Place Vendôme was built]. Hommes et Mondes (in French). 11 (43): 319–323. JSTOR 44207048.
- Saint-Simon (1879a). Boislisle, A. de (ed.). Mémoires du duc de Saint-Simon [Memoirs of the Duke of Saint-Simon] (in French). Vol. Tome second. Paris: Hachette. OCLC 1068033585. – 1694 to 1695
- Saint-Simon (1879b). Boislisle, A. de (ed.). Mémoires du duc de Saint-Simon [Memoirs of the Duke of Saint-Simon] (in French). Vol. Tome cinquième (2nd ed.). Paris: Hachette. OCLC 1068033585. – 1698
- Saint-Simon (1895). Boislisle, A. de (ed.). Mémoires du duc de Saint-Simon [Memoirs of the Duke of Saint-Simon] (in French). Vol. Tome onzième (Nouvelle édition ed.). Paris: Hachette. OCLC 1068033585. – 1703
- Saint-Simon (1896). Boislisle, A. de (ed.). Mémoires du duc de Saint-Simon [Memoirs of the Duke of Saint-Simon] (in French). Vol. Tome douzième. Paris: Hachette. OCLC 1068033585. – 1704 to 1705
- Saint-Simon (1910). Boislisle, A. de (ed.). Mémoires du duc de Saint-Simon [Memoirs of the Duke of Saint-Simon] (in French). Vol. Tome vingt et deuxième. Paris: Hachette. OCLC 1068033585. – 1711 to 1712
- Saint-Simon (1902). Boislisle, A. de (ed.). Mémoires du duc de Saint-Simon [Memoirs of the Duke of Saint-Simon] (in French). Vol. Tome seizième. Paris: Hachette. OCLC 1068033585. – 1708
- Saint-Simon (1923). Boislisle, A. de (ed.). Mémoires du duc de Saint-Simon [Memoirs of the Duke of Saint-Simon] (in French). Vol. Tome treizième. Paris: Hachette. OCLC 1068033585. – 1705 to 1706
- Saint-Simon (1914). Boislisle, A. de (ed.). Mémoires du duc de Saint-Simon [Memoirs of the Duke of Saint-Simon] (in French). Vol. Tome vingt et sixième. Paris: Hachette. OCLC 1068033585. – 1714 to 1715
- Saint-Simon (1919). Boislisle, A. de (ed.). Mémoires du duc de Saint-Simon [Memoirs of the Duke of Saint-Simon] (in French). Vol. Tome trentième (Nouvelle édition ed.). Paris: Hachette. OCLC 1068033585. – 1716
- Setton, Kenneth M. (1991). Venice, Austria, and the Turks in the seventeenth century. Philadelphia: American Philosophical Society. ISBN 0871691922.
- Sire, H. J. A. (1993). The Knights of Malta. New Haven: Yale University Press. ISBN 0-300-05502-1.
- Vertot (1855). Histoire des chevaliers de Malte (in French) (septième édition ed.). Tours: Ad Mame et Cie. OCLC 458513878.
- Verzijl, J. H.W. (1973). International Law in Historical Perspective. Vol. Part VI. Leiden: A. W. Zijthoff. ISBN 90-286-0223-2.

Philippe, Duke of Vendôme House of Bourbon-Vendôme Cadet branch of the House of Bourbon Born: 23 August 1655 Died: 24 January 1727
French nobility
Preceded by Louis Joseph	Duc de Vendôme; 1712–1727	Extinct
