= Vendôme =

Municipality in Centre-Val de Loire, France

- Subprefecture and commune
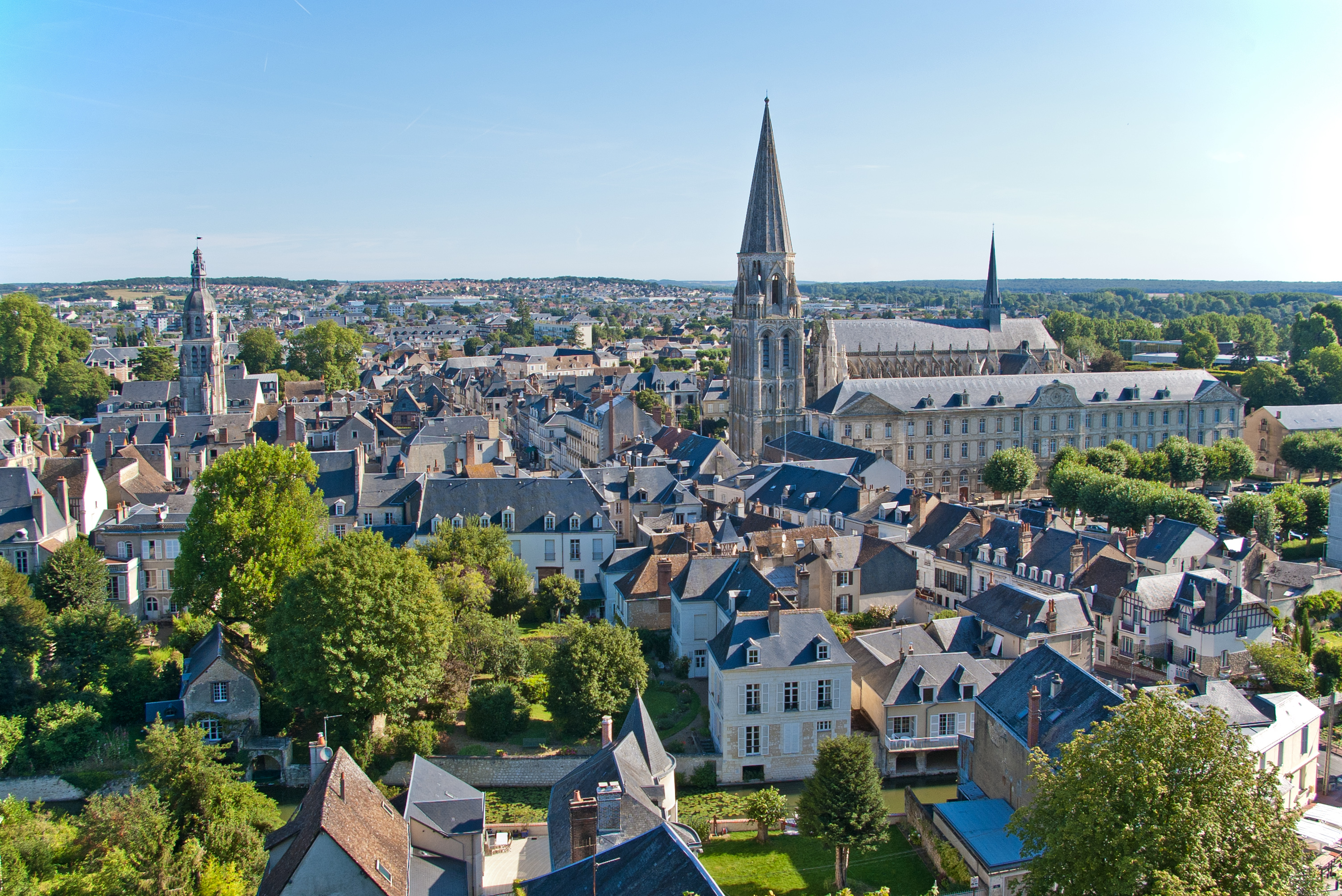
- View of Vendôme

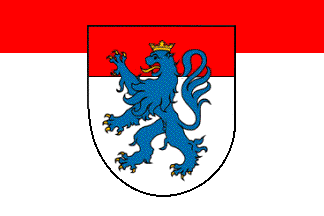
- Flag Coat of arms
- Location of Vendôme
- Location within France Location within Centre-Val de Loire
- Coordinates: 47°47′37″N 1°03′59″E
- Country: France
- Region: Centre-Val de Loire
- Department: Loir-et-Cher
- Arrondissement: Vendôme
- Canton: Vendôme
- Intercommunality: CA Territoires Vendômois

Government
  - Mayor (2020–2026): Laurent Brillard
- Area^{1}: 23.89 km^{2} (9.22 sq mi)
- Elevation: 82 m (269 ft)
- Highest elevation: 141 m (463 ft)
- Lowest elevation: 76 m (249 ft)
- Population (2023): 15,758
  - Density: 659.6/km^{2} (1,708/sq mi)
- Time zone: UTC+01:00 (CET)
  - Summer (DST): UTC+02:00 (CEST)
- INSEE/Postal code: 41269 /41100
- ^{1} French Land Register data, which excludes lakes, ponds, glaciers > 1 km^{2} (0.386 sq mi or 247 acres) and river estuaries.

Vendôme (/vɒ̃ˈdoʊm/, French: [vɑ̃dom]) is a subprefecture of the department of Loir-et-Cher, France. It is also the department's third-biggest commune with 15,758 inhabitants (2023).

It is one of the main towns along the river Loir. The river divides itself at the entrance of Vendôme, intersecting it into numerous different arms. The town has a rich medieval history and many historical monuments.

== History ==
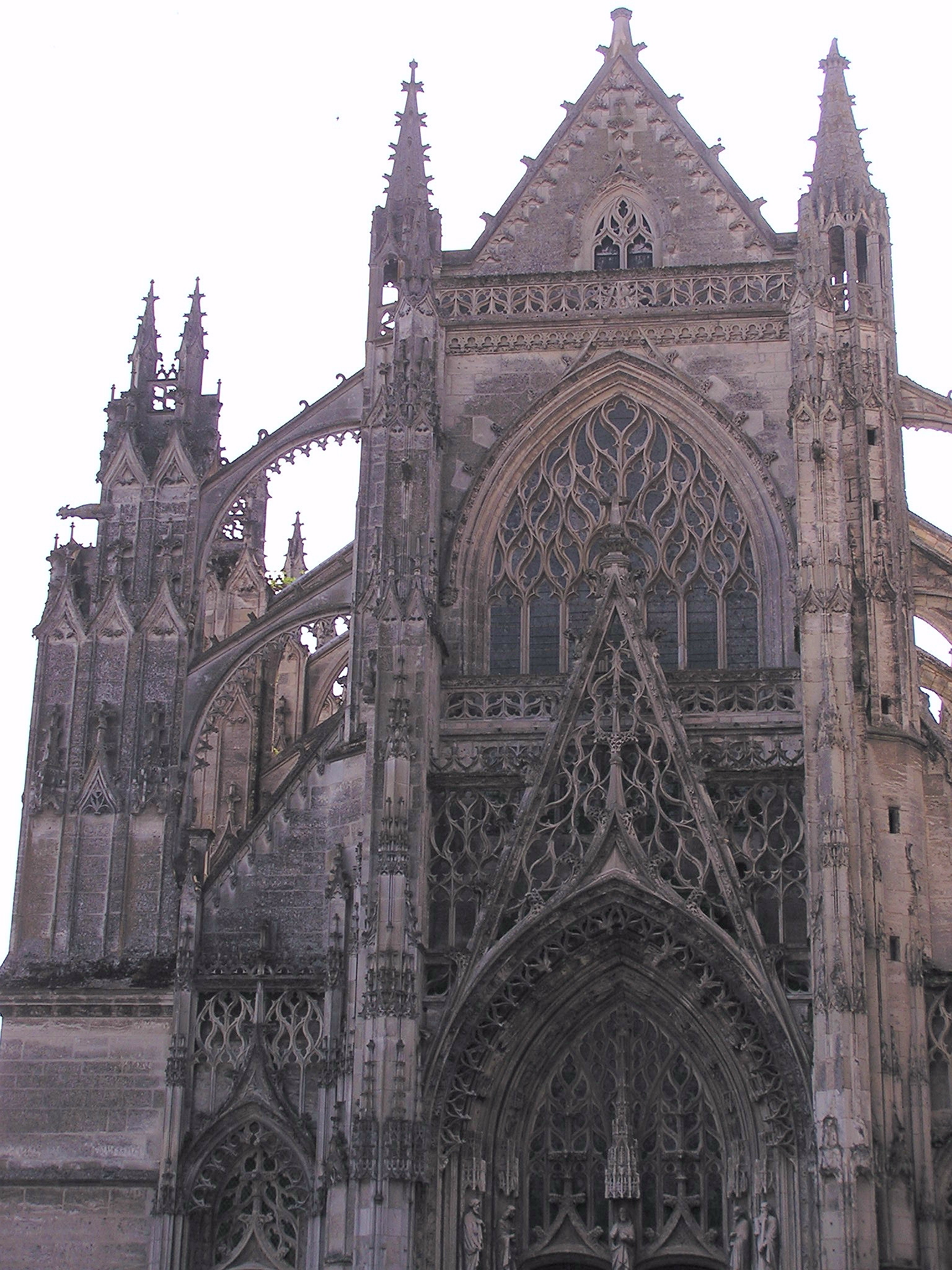
Façade of Abbaye de la Trinité

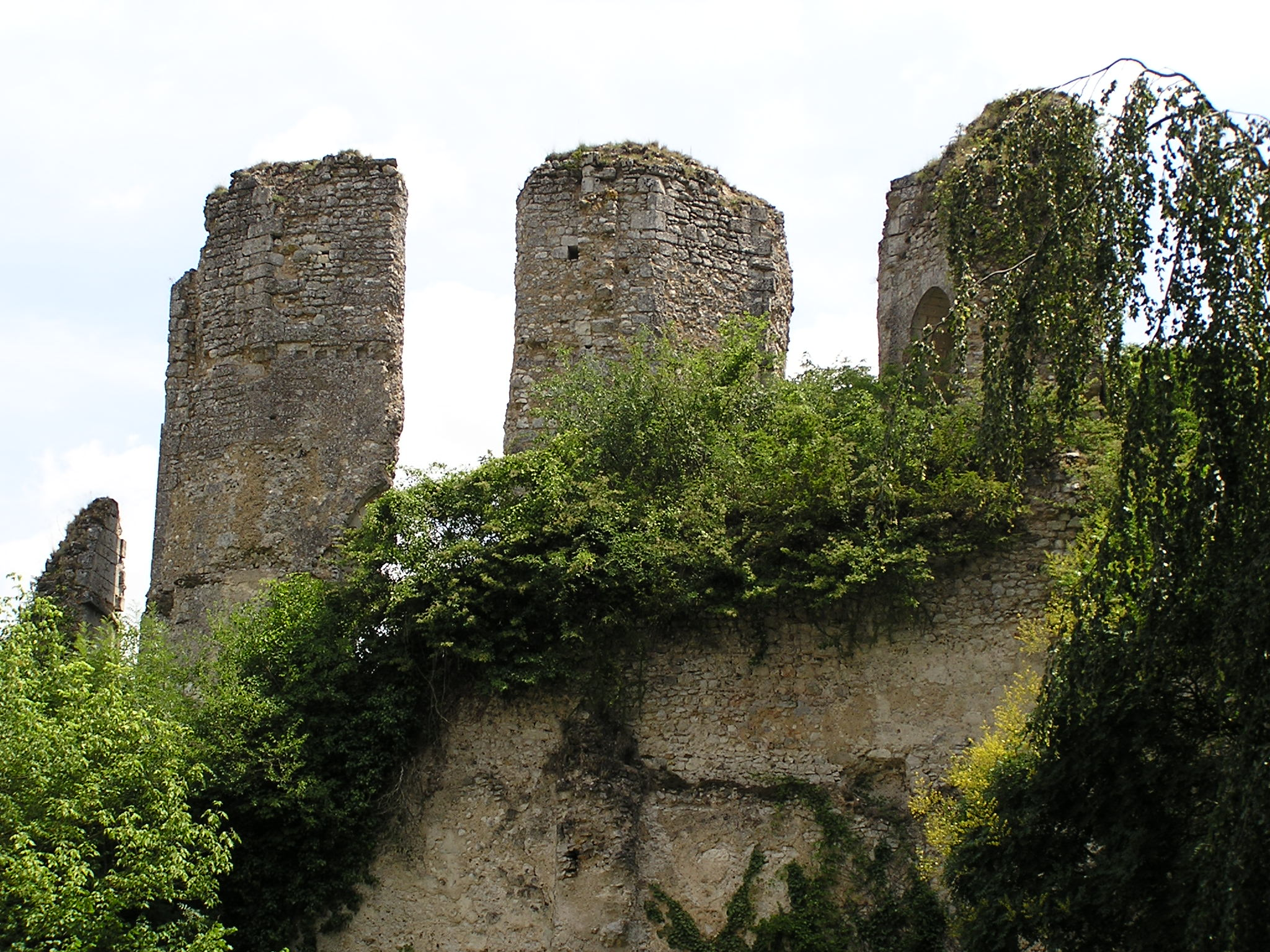
Ruins of the castle at Vendôme

Vendôme (in Latin: Vindocinum) appears originally to have been a Gallic oppidum, replaced later by a feudal castle, around which the modern town arose. Christianity was introduced by Saint Bienheuré in the 5th century, and the important abbey of the Trinity (which claimed to possess a tear shed by Jesus at the tomb of Lazarus) was founded about 1030. When the reign of the House of Capet began, Vendôme formed the chief town of a county belonging to Bouchard, called "the Venerable", who died in the monastery of Saint-Maur-des-Fossés in 1007.

The succession passed by various marriages to the houses of Nevers, Preuilly and Montoire. Bouchard VI, Count of Vendôme and Castres (died c. 1374), left as his heiress his sister Catherine, the wife of John of Bourbon, count of La Marche. The county of Vendôme was raised to the rank of a duchy and a peerage of France for Charles of Bourbon (1515); his son Antoine de Bourbon, king of Navarre, was the father of Henry IV, who gave the duchy of Vendôme in 1598 to his illegitimate son César de Bourbon (1594–1665). César, Duke of Vendôme, took part in the disturbances which went on in France under the government of Cardinal Richelieu and of Cardinal Mazarin; he was the father of Louis, Duke of Vendôme, who married a niece of Mazarin, and François de Vendôme, Duc de Beaufort. The last of his family in the male line was Louis XIV's famous general, Louis Joseph, duc de Vendôme (1645–1712).

Nominoe, King of Brittany, died undefeated in Vendôme in 851, after conquering the counties of Maine and Anjou.

The comte de Rochambeau, leader of 6,000 French troops in the American Revolutionary War, was born in Vendôme.

Place Vendôme in Paris had been the site of the Hôtel de Vendôme, a mansion which belonged to César de Bourbon, the illegitimate son of Henry IV and his mistress Gabrielle d'Estrées.

== Geography ==
Vendôme is located 22 miles (35 kilometres) northwest of the city of Blois and 40 minutes from Paris by TGV train (Vendôme-Villiers-sur-Loir TGV station). The town lies on the river Loir, which here divides into numerous arms intersecting the town.

== Administration ==
Vendôme is the capital of the arrondissement of Vendôme in the Loir-et-Cher department, of which it is a sub-prefecture. It has a tribunal of first instance.

== Population ==
Historical population

Year	Pop.	±% p.a.
1793	6,226	—
1800	7,555	+2.80%
1806	7,128	−0.96%
1821	6,997	−0.12%
1831	7,771	+1.05%
1836	8,206	+1.10%
1841	9,470	+2.91%
1846	8,481	−2.18%
1851	9,325	+1.92%
1856	9,377	+0.11%
1861	9,356	−0.04%
1866	9,938	+1.21%
1872	9,259	−1.17%
1876	9,221	−0.10%
1881	9,420	+0.43%
1886	9,325	−0.20%
1891	9,538	+0.45%
1896	9,777	+0.50%
1901	9,459	−0.66%

Year	Pop.	±% p.a.
1906	9,804	+0.72%
1911	9,707	−0.20%
1921	9,035	−0.71%
1926	9,301	+0.58%
1931	9,047	−0.55%
1936	9,344	+0.65%
1946	10,315	+0.99%
1954	10,811	+0.59%
1962	13,556	+2.87%
1968	16,157	+2.97%
1975	17,952	+1.52%
1982	17,593	−0.29%
1990	17,525	−0.05%
1999	17,707	+0.11%
2007	16,807	−0.65%
2012	17,024	+0.26%
2017	16,569	−0.54%
2023	15,758	−0.83%

Source: EHESS and INSEE (1968-2023)

== Sights ==
On the south, it is overlooked by an eminence on which stand the ruins of the castle of the counts of Vendôme. The abbey-church of the Holy Trinity has a façade in the florid Gothic style. Abbey buildings of various periods lie round the church. The church of La Madeleine (15th century) is surmounted by a stone spire, an imitation of that of the abbey. The tower of Saint-Martin (16th century) represents the vanished church of that name.

Other monuments are: the old gate, the Porte Saint-Georges; its river front is composed of two large crenelated and machicolated towers, connected by a pavilion, and the ancient hospital of Saint-Jacques that afterwards became a college of the Oratorians, then a lycée for boys and that is now occupied by the town administration offices. The charming chapel, in the most florid Gothic style, is preserved. In the garden surrounding, is located the tourism office in an ancient building called l'Orangerie (facing the public library). The town has a well-known archaeological and scientific society, and possesses a library with more than three hundred manuscripts, and a museum, mostly archaeological, in front of which stands a statue of the poet Pierre de Ronsard. There is also a statue of Marshal Rochambeau, born at Vendôme in 1725. Some interesting houses of the 15th and 16th centuries survive.

== Twin towns – sister cities ==
Vendôme is twinned with:

- Gevelsberg, Germany
- Hampton, United States
- Rizhao, China

== Climate ==
Climate data for Vendôme (Selommes) (1999–2010 normals, extremes 1999–2018)
Month	Jan	Feb	Mar	Apr	May	Jun	Jul	Aug	Sep	Oct	Nov	Dec	Year
Record high °C (°F)	15.0 (59.0)	18.0 (64.4)	25.0 (77.0)	29.0 (84.2)	33.0 (91.4)	38.0 (100.4)	39.5 (103.1)	41.5 (106.7)	35.5 (95.9)	30.0 (86.0)	22.0 (71.6)	17.0 (62.6)	41.5 (106.7)
Mean daily maximum °C (°F)	6.8 (44.2)	8.7 (47.7)	12.4 (54.3)	16.3 (61.3)	19.9 (67.8)	24.4 (75.9)	26.2 (79.2)	25.9 (78.6)	22.3 (72.1)	16.9 (62.4)	10.8 (51.4)	6.9 (44.4)	16.5 (61.7)
Daily mean °C (°F)	4.2 (39.6)	5.2 (41.4)	7.8 (46.0)	10.8 (51.4)	14.5 (58.1)	18.2 (64.8)	20.0 (68.0)	19.7 (67.5)	16.5 (61.7)	12.6 (54.7)	7.6 (45.7)	4.3 (39.7)	11.8 (53.2)
Mean daily minimum °C (°F)	1.5 (34.7)	1.8 (35.2)	3.2 (37.8)	5.4 (41.7)	9.0 (48.2)	12.1 (53.8)	13.8 (56.8)	13.5 (56.3)	10.7 (51.3)	8.3 (46.9)	4.4 (39.9)	1.7 (35.1)	7.1 (44.8)
Record low °C (°F)	−14.0 (6.8)	−16.0 (3.2)	−11.0 (12.2)	−3.0 (26.6)	−1.0 (30.2)	1.5 (34.7)	7.0 (44.6)	3.0 (37.4)	2.0 (35.6)	−2.0 (28.4)	−12.0 (10.4)	−8.0 (17.6)	−16.0 (3.2)
Average precipitation mm (inches)	57.2 (2.25)	48.2 (1.90)	50.9 (2.00)	51.3 (2.02)	61.1 (2.41)	47.7 (1.88)	55.4 (2.18)	40.8 (1.61)	51.7 (2.04)	66.9 (2.63)	61.7 (2.43)	66.4 (2.61)	659.3 (25.96)
Average precipitation days (≥ 1.0 mm)	11.4	9.7	10.2	10.1	10.1	7.5	7.4	6.3	7.6	10.5	11.1	11.8	113.9
Source: Meteociel

== See also ==
- Communes of the Loir-et-Cher department
- List of counts and dukes of Vendôme
- Oratory of Jesus
