= Bourbon-Vendôme =

French noble family

Bourbon-Vendôme refers to two branches of the House of Bourbon, the first of which became the senior legitimate line of the House of Bourbon in 1527, and succeeded to the throne of France in 1589 with Henry IV. He created the second house by granting the dukedom of Vendôme to one of his legitimized sons.

== First house ==
House of Bourbon-Vendôme
- Parent house: Bourbon-La Marche
- Country: France
- Founded: 1393; 633 years ago
- Founder: Louis de Bourbon
- Titles: Count of Vendôme; Duke of Vendôme; King of Navarre; King of France
- Dissolution: Merged in the Crown (1589; 437 years ago)

The first House of Bourbon-Vendôme was descended from Louis de Bourbon, Count of Vendôme (1376–1446), a cadet of the House of Bourbon-La Marche. Though a younger son, Louis received the title of Count of Vendôme through his mother. In 1514, the earldom of Vendôme was raised to a duchy-peerage in favour of Charles de Bourbon. By 1527, Charles had outlived the dukes of Alençon and of Bourbon, and he became first prince of the blood, the head of the most senior line of the dynasty after the royal family. Charles' son Antoine became King of Navarre in 1555, by marriage. Upon the extinction of all male lines of the House of Valois in 1589, Antoine's son Henry III of Navarre became King of France as Henry IV, the first in the House of Bourbon. At that point, his other titles merged in the Crown.

== Second house ==
House of Bourbon-Vendôme (Légitimé de France)
- Parent house: Bourbon
- Country: France
- Founded: 1598; 428 years ago
- Founder: César de Bourbon
- Titles: Duke of Vendôme; Duke of Beaufort; Duke of Étampes; Duke of Mercœur; Count of Penthièvre (later Duke of Penthièvre)
- Dissolution: 1727; 299 years ago

The second House of Bourbon-Vendôme descended directly from the first house. It was founded by César de Bourbon (1594–1665), the legitimized son of Henry IV and his mistress, Gabrielle d'Estrées.

Born in 1594, César de Bourbon was created Duke of Vendôme by his father, the former holder, in 1598. After the creation of 1598, the title continued to be used by César de Bourbon's family for over a century.

In 1599, César de Bourbon also inherited the titles of Duke of Beaufort and Duke of Étampes upon the death of his mother. After César de Bourbon's death in 1665, he was succeeded as Duke of Vendôme by his first son Louis (1612–1669), while the title of Duke of Beaufort passed to his second son François (1616–1669).

After the death of the 4th Duke of Vendôme in 1727, the title reverted to the Crown. It was later used as a courtesy title by Louis-Stanislas, Count of Provence (the future Louis XVIII), the younger brother of Louis XVI.

=== Genealogy ===
1. César de Bourbon, 1st Duke of Vendome, 2nd Duke of Beaufort (1594–1665). In 1608, he married Françoise de Lorraine, Duchess of Mercœur and of Penthièvre (1592–1669), daughter and heiress of Philippe Emmanuel, Duke of Mercœur, a rival of his father Henry IV's. They had three children.
  1. Louis II de Bourbon-Vendôme, 2nd Duke of Vendôme (1612–1669). He married Laura Mancini, niece of Cardinal Mazarin, and had three children.
    1. Louis Joseph de Bourbon-Vendôme, 3rd Duke of Vendôme (1654–1712). He was appointed Marshal of France. He married Marie Anne de Condé (1678–1718), a daughter of Henri III Jules de Bourbon, Prince of Condé and granddaughter of Louis II de Bourbon, Prince of Condé (the Grand Condé). They had no children. After his death, the titles passed to his younger brother, Philippe.
    2. Philippe de Bourbon-Vendôme, 4th Duke of Vendôme (1655–1727), called le prieur de Vendôme. A grand prior for France in the Order of Malta, he was also a French army commander. He held the title until his death in 1727.
    3. Jules César (1657–1660)
  2. Élisabeth de Bourbon (1614–1664), styled mademoiselle de Vendôme before her marriage to Charles Amadeus of Savoy, 6th Duke of Nemours.
  3. François de Bourbon-Vendôme, 1st Duke of Beaufort (1616–1669), who never married and had no children.

=== Gallery ===
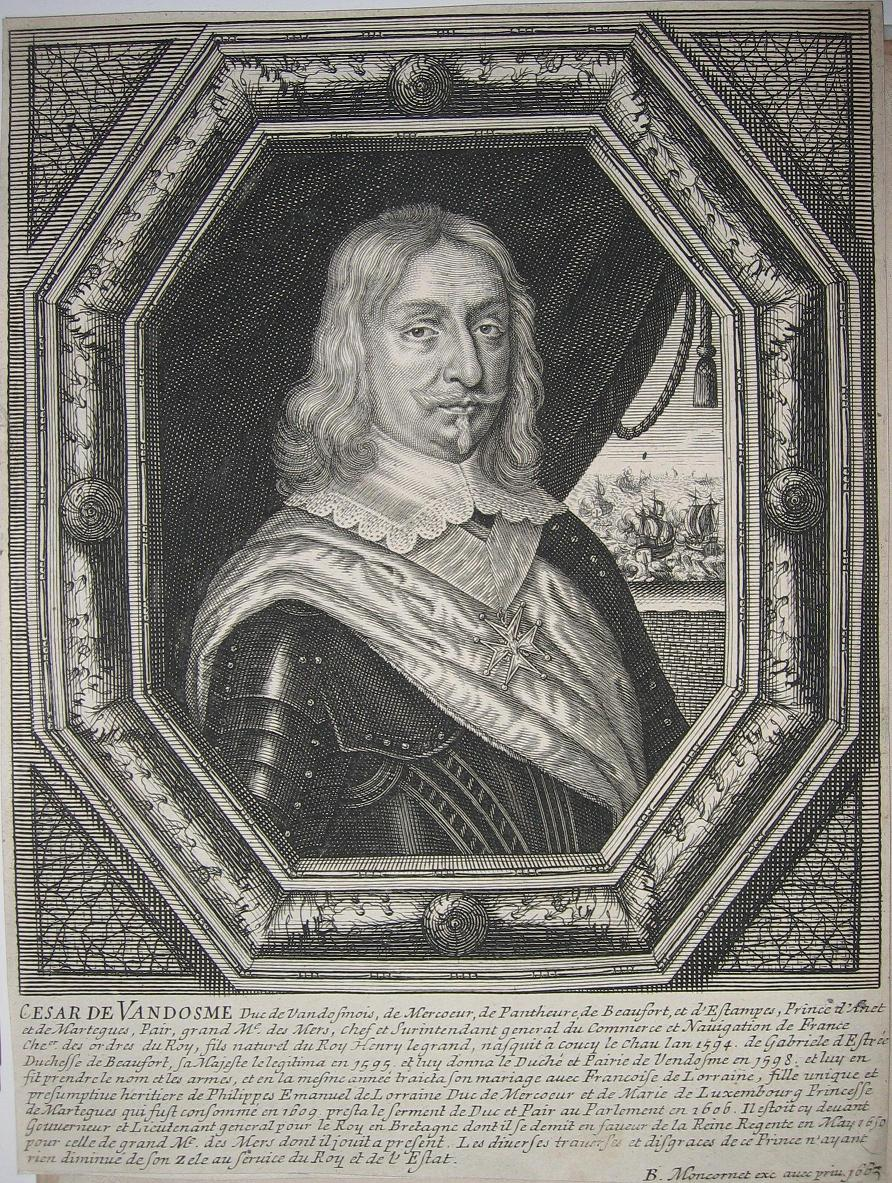
César de Bourbon, the founder

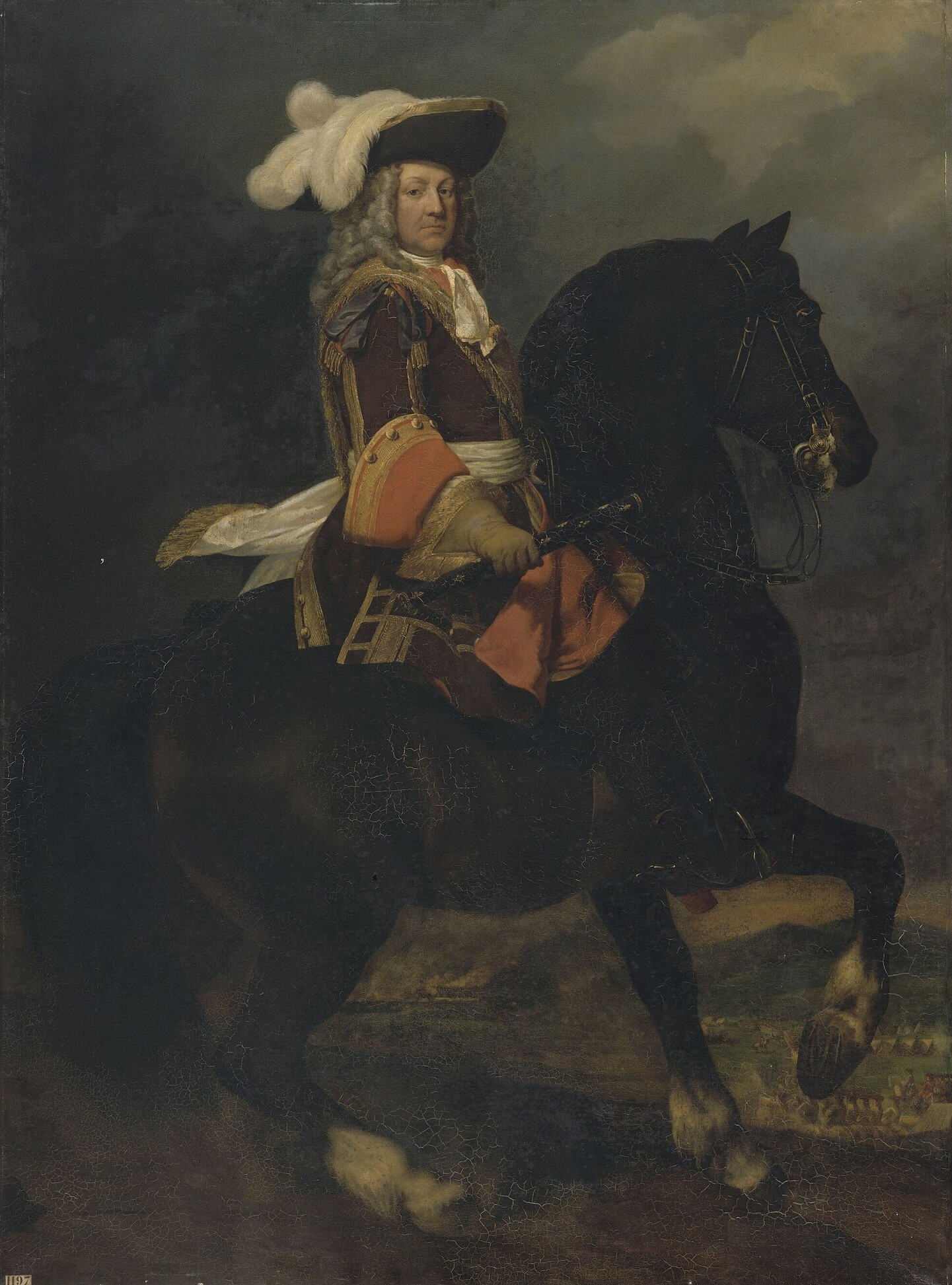
Louis Joseph de Bourbon, the Duke of Vendôme on campaign, 1706

=== Ancestry ===
8. Charles de Bourbon
4. Antoine of Navarre
9. Françoise of Alençon
2. Henry IV of France
10. Henry II of Navarre
5. Jeanne III of Navarre
11. Marguerite of Angoulême
1. House of Bourbon-Vendôme
12. Jean d'Estrees
6. Antoine d'Estrées, marquis de Cœuvres
13. Catherine de Bourbon-Vendôme-Ligny
3. Gabrielle d'Estrées
14. Jean Babou
7. Françoise Babou
15. Françoise Robertet

== Other illegitimate houses ==
- Bourbon-Busset
- Bourbon-Maine (extinct)
- Bourbon-Penthièvre (extinct)

== See also ==
- - French site with further information on the family
