= Battle of Cassano (1705) =

1705 battle of the War of the Spanish Succession

Coordinates: 45.5333°N 9.5167°E

- Part of the War of the Spanish Succession
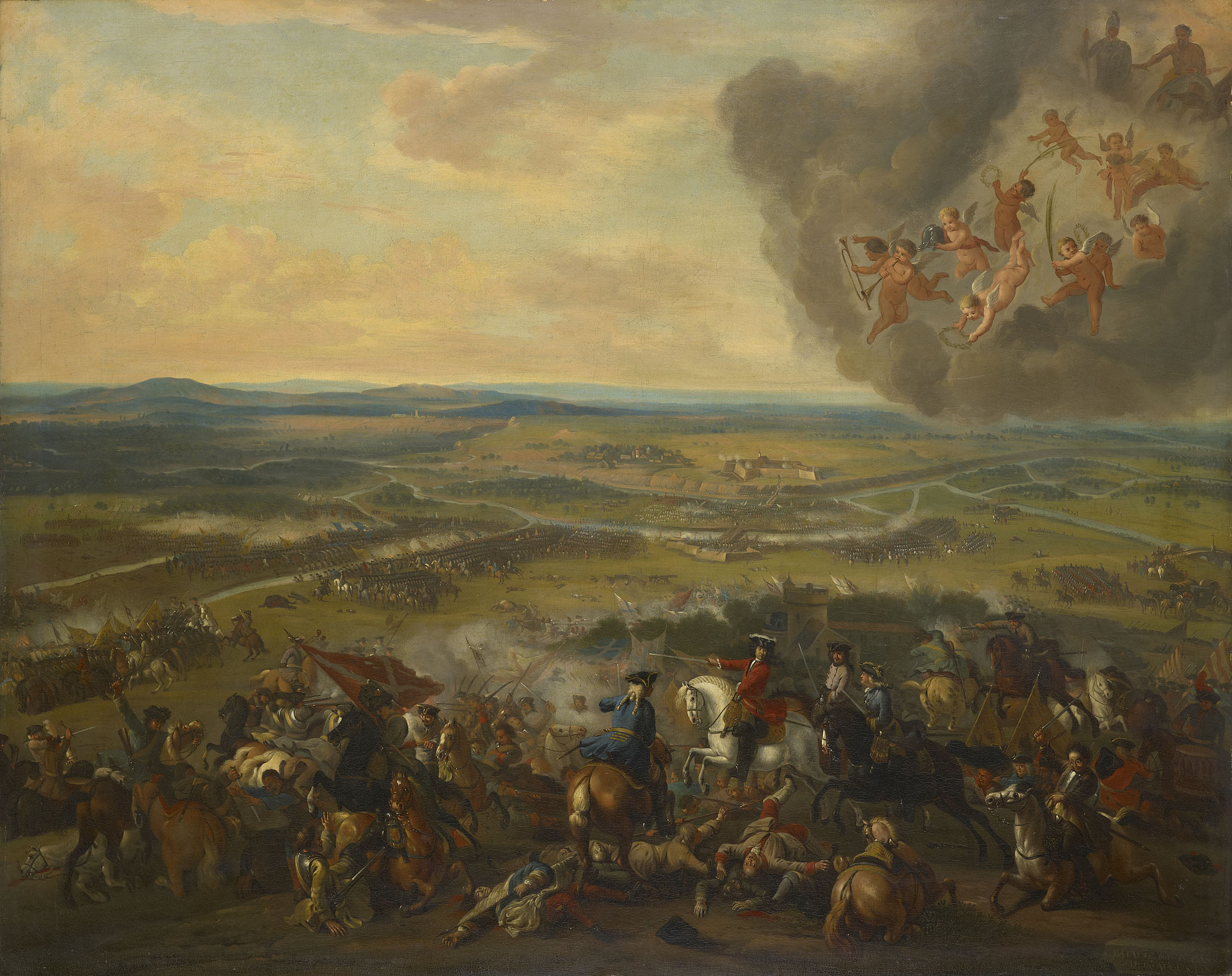
- The Battle of Cassano, 1705; Jan van Huchtenburgh, 1720–1730
Date	16 August 1705
Location	Cassano d'Adda, Lombardy, Italy
Result	French victory

Belligerents
France	Habsburg monarchy Prussia; Savoy

Commanders and leaders
duc de Vendôme; Philippe de Vendôme; Armand St Hilaire	Prince Eugene (WIA) Leopold of Anhalt-Dessau

Strength
22,000 to 24,000	20,000 to 24,000

Casualties and losses
3,000 to 5,000 killed or wounded	4,500 to 6,050 killed, wounded or captured

The Battle of Cassano took place on 16 August 1705, during the War of the Spanish Succession, near Cassano d'Adda, in Lombardy, Italy. It was fought between a French army commanded by the duc de Vendôme, and an Imperial force under Prince Eugene of Savoy.

In October 1703, Victor Amadeus II of Savoy joined the Grand Alliance. By August 1705, the French had occupied most of Savoy, and were about to besiege Turin. Prince Eugene sought to delay this by crossing the Adda at Cassano, and threatening Milan.

Taken by surprise, the French managed to hold the bridge after several hours of combat, both sides suffering heavy casualties. Prince Eugene was unable to cross the Adda but delayed the assault on Turin, while Vendôme and many of his troops were recalled to France in May 1706. Turin was relieved in September, and the war in Northern Italy ended with the March 1707 Convention of Milan.

== Background ==
The War of the Spanish Succession was triggered by the death in November 1700 of the childless Charles II of Spain. He named his heir as Philip of Anjou, grandson of Louis XIV of France, who on 16 November 1700 became ruler of the Spanish Empire. In addition to mainland Spain, this included the Spanish Netherlands, large parts of Italy, and much of Central and South America. In July 1701, disputes over territorial and commercial rights led to war between the Bourbon-led kingdoms of France and Spain, and the Grand Alliance, whose candidate was Charles, younger son of Leopold I, Holy Roman Emperor.

The war in Northern Italy centred on the Spanish-controlled Duchies of Milan and Mantua, which Leopold considered essential for the security of Austria's southern borders. In March 1701, both cities were occupied by French troops in alliance with Victor Amadeus II, ruler of Savoy, in return for which his daughter Maria Luisa of Savoy married Philip V. Following a series of British naval victories in the Mediterranean, Victor Amadeus switched sides in October 1703. During 1704, French forces under de La Feuillade captured Savoyard territories north of the Alps in Villefranche and the County of Savoy. By May 1705, Victor Amadeus controlled only the city of Nice, his capital of Turin, and parts of Southern Piedmont.

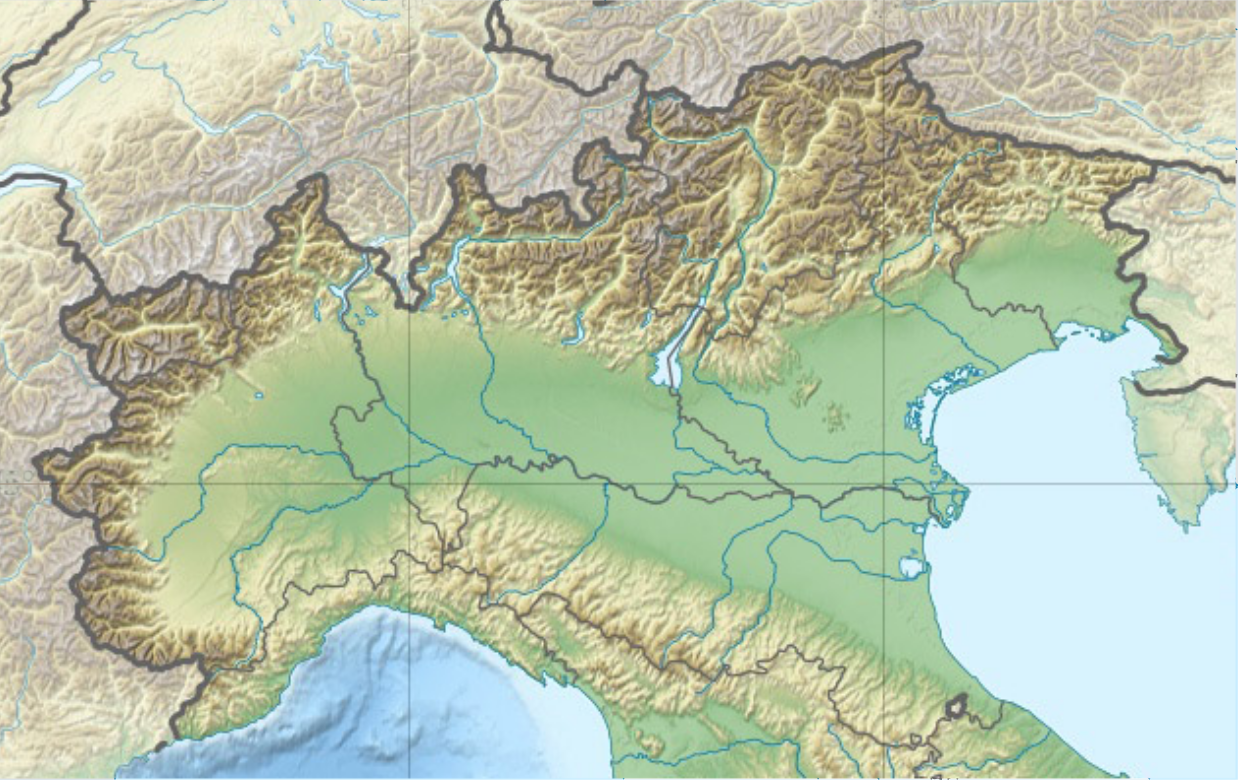
Northern Italy; note Cassano's position on the River Adda

Despite their alliance, Leopold mis-trusted Victor Amadeus, whose ultimate goal was to gain possession of Milan, while his resources were focused on suppressing an uprising in Hungary. However, with Savoy close to defeat, he sent his best general, Prince Eugene, to assume command in Italy, along with men and money, a policy continued after his death in May by Emperor Joseph. These Imperial troops were reinforced by 8,000 Prussians under Leopold of Anhalt-Dessau, who were funded by England and the Dutch Republic.

At the beginning of 1705, French troops in Lombardy were holding a line along the Oglio river, under the command of Philippe de Vendôme, younger brother of the duc de Vendôme and known as the "Grand Prior". The Imperial army quickly reached Brescia, forcing them to abandon these positions and retreat to the Adda. Leaving his deputy Louis d'Aubusson de La Feuillade to complete the capture of Nice, in July Vendôme moved to reinforce his brother, capturing the Savoyard fortresses at Crescentino and Chivasso as he did so. In order to relieve the pressure on Turin, Prince Eugene began marching along the left bank of the Adda, which allowed him to threaten Milan. With Philippe and 10,000 men blocking the closest suitable crossing point at Cassano d'Adda, Vendôme led a mobile reserve along the right bank tracking the Imperialists on the left.

When the Imperial army reached Iveza in the Brianza, they constructed a pontoon bridge under cover of artillery fire and Vendôme prepared to defend the crossing. This was a feint; after a perfunctory attempt to cross, Prince Eugene burned the bridge and headed towards Mantua. He then doubled back, hoping to catch the detachment at Cassano by surprise before they could be reinforced by the main French army, and on 14 August reached Romanengo, about 40 kilometres away.

== Battle ==
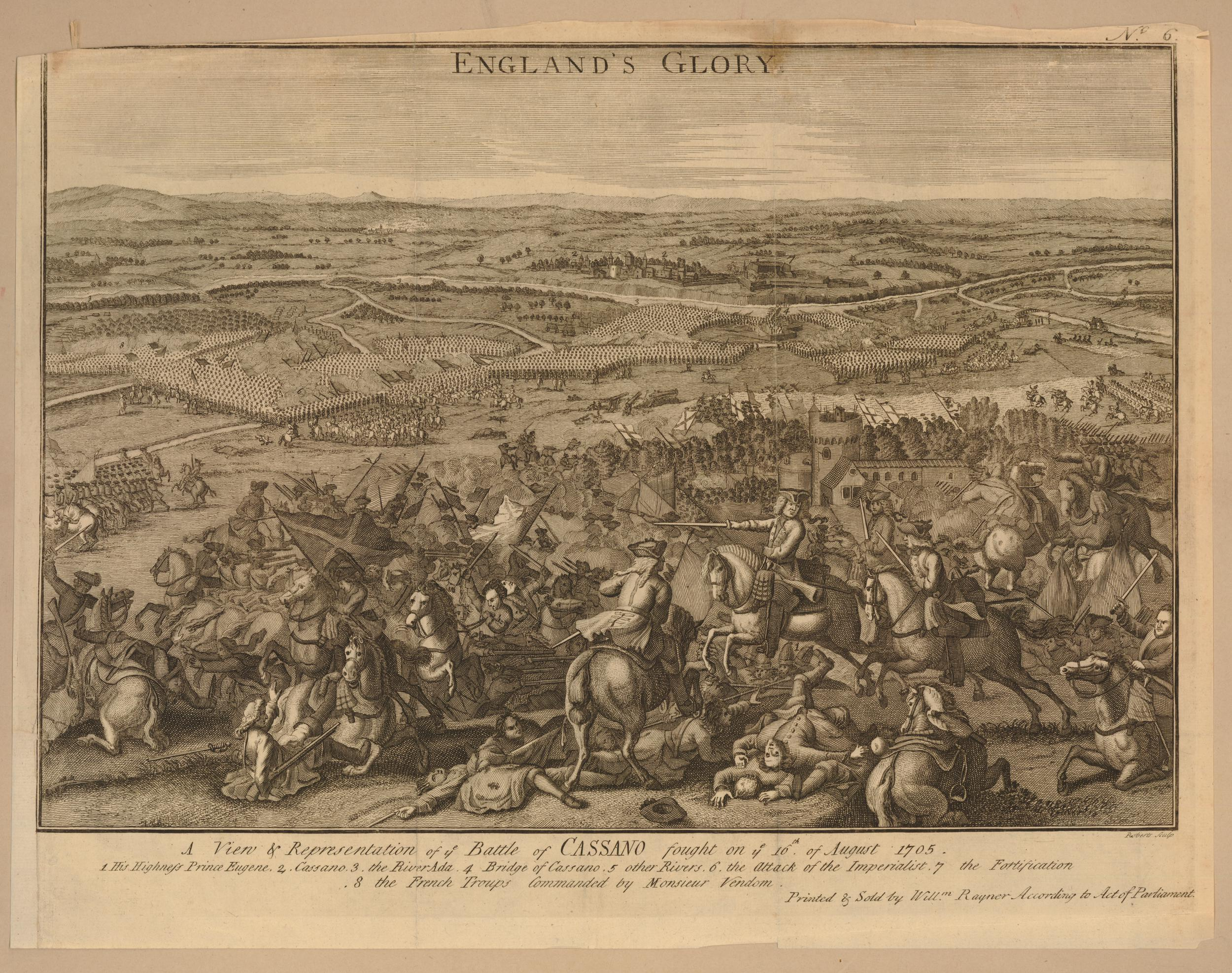
1739 engraving of the battle by Henry Roberts

A deep and fast-flowing river, the Adda had limited crossing points, especially for large bodies of men. The town of Cassano was on the right bank, with a stone bridge protected by a small fortification or redoubt. The area was also divided by numerous small streams and irrigation channels, the most significant being the Retorto, an irrigation canal running parallel to the Adda. This was connected to the left bank by another bridge, protected by another strongpoint.

Assuming Prince Eugene was heading for Mantua, Vendôme ordered his brother to leave Cassano, and take up blocking positions at Rivolta d'Adda, a village about 10 kilometres away on the left bank of the Adda. One suggestion is his decision was based on deliberate misinformation from a Spanish officer serving in the French army who was in reality an Austrian agent. After marching overnight from Romanengo, Imperial troops were already nearing the crossing point when they were spotted by a French cavalry patrol early next morning; realising their intentions, Vendôme hurried towards Cassano with around 2,000 cavalry, ordering the rest of his army to follow as quickly as possible.

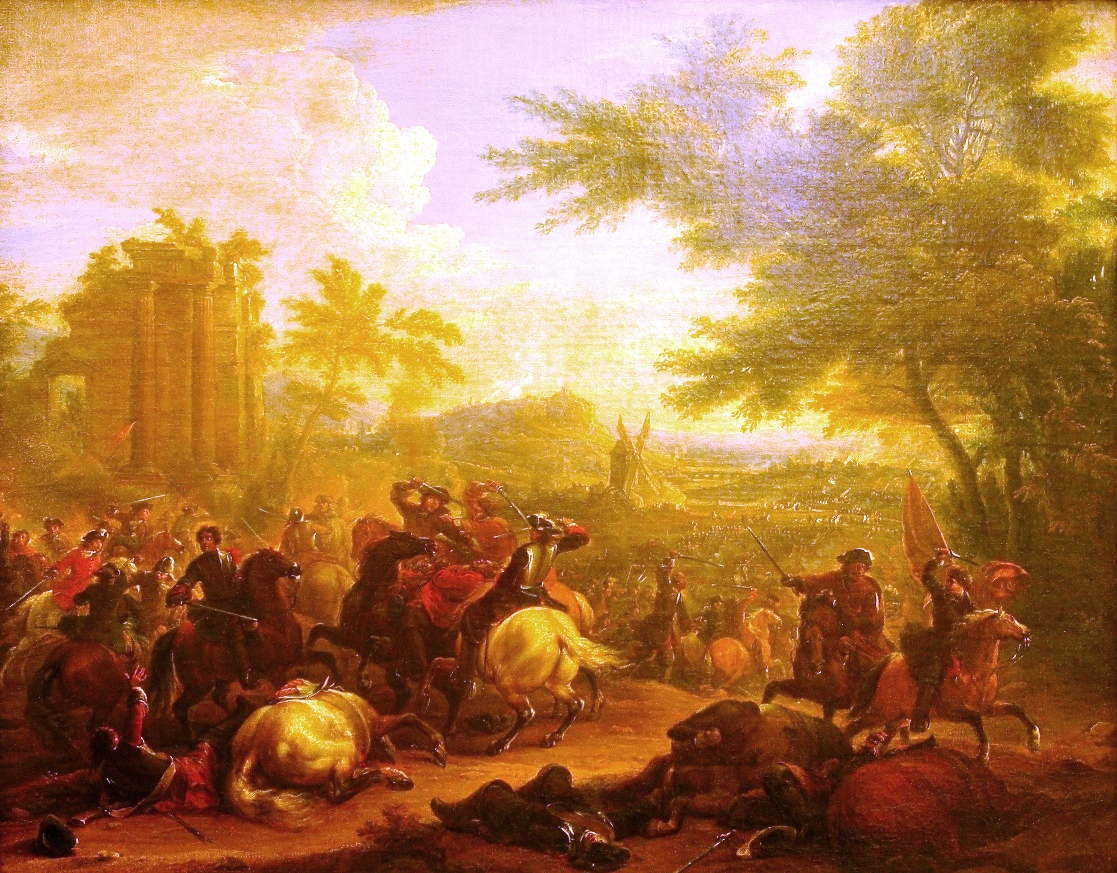
The bridge at Cassano, by Jean-Baptiste Martin, circa 1725

On arrival, he found Philippe's troops in the process of moving and in an extremely dangerous position, with the bulk of their force caught between the Retorto canal and the Adda, and the main bridge blocked by their transport. Vendôme ordered the baggage thrown into the river, and formed a line running from the Retorto on the left, his centre around the main bridge, and his extreme right resting on the road leading to Rivolta d'Adda, where his brother was positioned with four brigades. Armand St Hilaire, the French artillery commander, positioned his guns inside the town, allowing him to fire directly on the bridge.

Around 14:00, Imperial grenadiers attacked positions around the Retorto and initially succeeded in capturing the bridge, before being repulsed by St Hilaire's guns, and a French counter-attack. Vendôme sent four regiments of the Irish Brigade to reinforce his left, but after a fierce struggle, the Imperialists captured the sluice gates, which they closed, lowering the water level in the canal enough for men to wade across it. Prince Eugene ordered Leopold and his Prussians into the canal to assault the French left; they managed to seize the further bank, but suffered heavily in doing so. The battle surged back and forth across the river, in the course of which Vendôme had his horse killed under him, while Prince Eugene was wounded twice and had to leave the field. The fighting lasted between three and five hours until ended by sheer exhaustion with the opposing forces back in their original positions.

== Aftermath ==
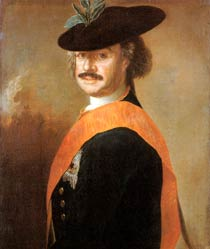
Leopold I, Prince of Anhalt-Dessau

Nearly 25% of those engaged became casualties, Vendôme losing around 5,000 killed or wounded out of 22,000, his opponents over 4,500 killed, wounded or captured from 24,000. French military historian De Périni suggests French casualties of 2,728 killed or wounded, with Imperialist losses of around 6,000, including nearly 2,000 taken prisoner. In his own account, the Chevalier Folard, a French officer who was badly wounded in the battle, reports similar casualty figures of 3,000 and 5,000 respectively; he also suggests that if Vendôme had called on the troops left at Rivolta d'Adda, he might have won a significant victory.

Since Prince Eugene achieved his aim of delaying the Siege of Turin by nearly a year, he claimed Cassano as a victory, although historian John A. Lynn considers it a French victory. The two sides spent the next few weeks watching each other; Prince Eugene quickly recovered from his injuries and in early October began building barracks at Treviglio to make it seem he had decided to stay there for the winter. Vendôme returned to Southern Piedmont to meet with La Feuillade, but it was now October, and they decided it was too late in the year to attack Turin. Nevertheless, Victor Amadeus' position remained precarious; in December, Nice finally surrendered, and his possessions north of the Alps were held by France until the end of the war.

Defeat at Ramillies in May 1706 forced Louis XIV to recall Vendôme from Italy, leaving the less competent La Feuillade in command. On 15 August, Prince Eugene began his advance on Turin, which he reached on 29th in a series of marches seen as comparable in skill and execution to Marlborough's more famous march to the Danube in 1704. After the siege was lifted in September, remaining French forces in Italy were withdrawn and fighting in Northern Italy ended with the March 1707 Convention of Milan.

== Sources ==
- "A Brief Historical Sketch of the Irish Infantry Regiment of Dillon and the Irish Stuart Regiments in the Service of France, 1690–1791". Royal United Services Institution. Journal. 49 (325): 302–305. February 1905. doi:10.1080/03071840509418684.
- Bancks, John (1745). The history of Francis-Eugene Prince of Savoy (2010 ed.). Gale ECCO. ISBN 1170621236.
- Bodart, G. (1908). Militär-historisches Kriegs-Lexikon (1618-1905).
- Clodfelter, M. (2017). Warfare and Armed Conflicts: A Statistical Encyclopedia of Casualty and Other Figures, 1492-2015 (4th ed.). Jefferson, North Carolina: McFarland. ISBN 978-0-7864-7470-7.
- De Périni, Hardÿ (1896). Batailles françaises, Volume VI 1700-1782. Ernest Flammarion.
- Dhondt, Frederik (2015). De Ruysscher, D; Capelle, K (eds.). History in Legal Doctrine; Vattel and Réal De Curban on the Spanish Succession; the War of the Spanish Succession in Legal history; moving in new directions. Maklu. ISBN 9789046607589.
- Falkner, James (2015). The War of the Spanish Succession 1701-1714. Pen and Sword. ISBN 9781473872905.
- Folard, Jean Charles, Chevalier (1761). Frederick the Great (ed.). L'esprit du chevalier Folard, tiré de ses "Commentaires sur l'histoire de Polybe", pour l'usage d'un officier, de main de maître (in French) (2011 ed.). Nabu. ISBN 978-1173641139.
- Jones, Archer (1997). The Art of War in the Western World. Barnes and Noble. ISBN 978-0760707340.
- Lynn, John (1999). The Wars of Louis XIV 1667-1714. Longman. ISBN 0582056292.
- Nolan, Cathal (2008). The Wars in the Age of Louis XIV, 1650-1715: An Encyclopedia of Global Warfare and Civilization. Greenwood. ISBN 978-0313330469.
- O'Conor, Matthew (1845). Military History of the Irish Nation: Comprising a Memoir of the Irish Brigade in the Service of France; (2017 ed.). Forgotten Books. ISBN 1330370775.
- Somerset, Anne (2012). Queen Anne; the Politics of Passion. Harper. ISBN 978-0007203765.
- Symcox, Geoffrey (1983). Victor Amadeus II: Absolutism in the Savoyard State, 1675-1730. Thames and Hudson. ISBN 978-0500870105.
- Ward, William; Leathes, Stanley (1912). The Cambridge Modern History (2010 ed.). Nabu. ISBN 978-1174382055.
- Wilson, Peter (1998). German Armies: War and German Society, 1648-1806. Routledge. ISBN 1857281063.
