= Duke of Beaufort (France) =

Ducal title in France

Dukedom of Beaufort
- Creation date: 1597
- Creation: First
- Peerage: France
- First holder: Gabrielle d'Estrées
- Last holder: Louis Joseph, 5th Duke of Beaufort

Duke of Beaufort (French: duc de Beaufort) was a title in the French nobility.

== History ==
The dukedom was first created in 1597 as a peerage for Gabrielle d'Estrées, Marchioness of Monceaux, the mistress of King Henry IV, with a remainder to their illegitimate son César, who later also became Duke of Vendôme.

The duchy (i.e. the lands associated with the dukedom) was sold by the 5th Duke of Beaufort in 1688 to Charles François Frédéric de Montmorency-Luxembourg, who was created Duke of Beaufort without a peerage that same year. The dukedom of Beaufort was renamed dukedom of Montmorency in 1689. He later succeeded as Duke of Piney-Luxembourg.

== Dukes of Beaufort – first creation (1597) ==
- 1597–1599 : Gabrielle, 1st Duchess of Beaufort (1571–1599)
- 1599–1665 : César, 2nd Duke of Beaufort (1594–1665)
- 1665–1669 : François, 3rd Duke of Beaufort (1616–1669)
- 1669–1675 : Louis, 4th Duke of Beaufort (1612–1669)
- 1675–1688 : Louis Joseph, 5th Duke of Beaufort (1654–1712)

== Dukes of Beaufort – second creation (1688) ==
- 1688–1689 : Charles, 1st Duke of Beaufort (1662–1726).
- The dukedom's name was changed from Beaufort to Montmorency in 1689. For holders of this title, see Duke of Montmorency (third creation).
