= Duke of Mercœur =

Arms of the Dukes of Mercœur of the House of Lorraine

The Seigneurs and Dukes of Mercœur were a line of powerful lords deriving their name from the estate of Mercœur in Auvergne, France. The line became extinct in the 14th century, and passed by inheritance to the dauphins of Auvergne, counts of Clermont. In 1426 it passed to the Bourbons by the marriage, of Jeanne de Clermont, dauphine of Auvergne, to Louis I, Count of Montpensier. It formed part of the confiscated estates of the Constable de Bourbon, and was given by Francis I and Louise of Savoy to Antoine, Duke of Lorraine, and his wife, Renée of Bourbon, sister of the Constable. Nicholas of Lorraine, son of Duke Antoine, was created Duke of Mercœur and a peer of France in 1569. His son Philippe Emmanuel left a daughter, who married the duc de Vendôme in 1609.

== Dukes of Mercœur ==
=== House of Lorraine ===
- Nicholas 1569–1577
- Philippe Emmanuel 1577–1602

=== House of Bourbon-Vendôme ===
- Françoise 1602–1649, with her husband César de Bourbon, duc de Vendôme 1609–1649
- Louis 1649–1669
- Louis Joseph 1669–1712

The title became extinct in 1712.

=== Other creations ===
The title was re-created in 1723 for Louis François I de Bourbon, prince de Conti, who sold it back to the crown in 1770. In 1773, it was re-created for Charles, Count of Artois, but was exchanged in 1778 for Poitou.
