= Fulk of Vendôme =

- Count of Vendôme
- Reign: 1028–1032 and 1056–1066
- Predecessor: Bouchard II
- Successor: Bouchard III
- Died: 21 or 22 November 1066; Ferrières-en-Touraine
- Burial: Collegiate Church of Saint-Georges de Vendôme
- Spouse: Pétronille de Château-Renard
- Issue: Bouchard III · Euphrosine · Agatha
- House: Vendôme
- Father: Bodon of Nevers
- Mother: Adela of Vendôme

Fulk of Vendôme (died 21 or 22 November 1066 at Ferrières-en-Touraine), also known as Fulk of Nevers and Foulque l'Oison, was the count of Vendôme from 1028 until his expulsion in 1032 and again from 1056 to his death. He was the second son of Bodon of Nevers and Adela of Vendôme.

In 1028, his elder brother, Bouchard II of Vendôme, died and their mother took up the regency for the young Fulk. Half of the county was entrusted to Fulk's care. Unsatisfied, Fulk sought to evict his mother from her half. Adela gave her share to Geoffrey Martel, Count of Anjou. Martel was not long in seizing the whole county. This state continued until 1056, when Henry I of France ordered Martel to return the county of Vendôme to Fulk. Fulk was thereafter under the suzerainty of the counts of Anjou.

In his final decade as count, Fulk entered into war with Theobald III of Blois and with the Trinity Abbey, Vendôme.

He was married to Pétronille de Château-Renard. They had three children and possibly a fourth:

- Bouchard III, succeeded in Vendôme
- Euphrosine, married Geoffrey III of Preuilly
- Agatha, married Ralph Payen, viscount of Vendôme
- Geoffroy (attested in some sources)

Fulk died on 21 or 22 November 1066 and was buried in the Collegiate Church of Saint-Georges de Vendôme.

Preceded by Bouchard II	Count of Vendôme; 1028–1032	Succeeded by Geoffrey I
Preceded by Geoffrey I	Count of Vendôme; 1056–1066	Succeeded by Bouchard III
