= Renaud of Vendôme =

French bishop and count

Renaud of Vendôme was one of the first chancellors of France. He was bishop of Paris from 991 to 1017, as well as count of Vendôme (1005–1017). He was from the Bouchardides family, as a son of Bouchard I, Count of Vendôme and of Elisabeth of Melun.

Chancellor to Hugh Capet (988), who later made him bishop of Paris, Renaud's power was reduced by the accession of Robert II the Pious (996) and his influence on the royal council diminished. He stayed in the Vendômois more and more, and succeeded his father as count in 1005.

== Sources ==
- Bachrach, Bernard S. (1993). Fulk Nerra, the Neo-Roman Consul 987-1040. University of California Press.
- Fanning, Steven (1988). A Bishop and His World Before the Gregorian Reform: Hubert of Angers, 1006-1047. The American Philosophical Society.

Preceded by Bouchard I the Venerable	count of Vendôme; 1005–1017	Succeeded by Bodon of Nevers
