= Action of March 1665 =

1665 naval battle

This minor naval action took place in March 1665 near Goletta, Tunisia, and was a victory for a small French force of four ships and two fireships under the Duc de Beaufort over an Algerine force. Three Algerine ships were sunk, including one of 46 guns.
