= Bouchard I of Vendôme =

Bouchard I (Note: the Venerable or the Old One) (d. 27 February 1005), was the Count of Vendôme. He inherited Vendôme on the death of his father between 956 and 967. After his marriage to Elisabeth of Melun, Bouchard also became count of Corbeil, Melun, and Paris. In 991, with the assistance of King Hugh Capet, he put down a rebellion by Odo of Blois. After retiring to the Saint-Maur Abbey, Bouchard died on 27 February 1005.

== Biography ==
Bouchard was the son of Bouchard the Bat of Vendôme. He was sent by his parents, while still very young, to the court of Hugh the Great, befriending Hugh's son, Hugh Capet. By 960, Bouchard married Élisabeth of Melun, widow of Haymon, count of Corbeil. Bouchard became count of Corbeil through this marriage, and his overlord, Hugh Capet, gave him custody of the county of Melun and the Abbaye de Saint-Maur.

In March 981, Bouchard with the bishop of Orléans, Arnoul, and other faithful, accompanied Hugh Capet to Rome for an interview with Emperor Otto II.

In 987, following Hugh Capet's ascension as king, Bouchard was given the county of Paris. Thus becoming a royal count. In 991, Odo I, Count of Blois, took the royal castle Melun, by bribing Walter, one of Bouchard's knights. Hugh Capet, after demanding the restoration of the castle to Bouchard, raised his vassals and recaptured Melun. Walter and his wife were hanged near a gate of the castle. Odo I of Blois fled. Bouchard and Odo later clashed at the battle of Orsay; Odo, losing, fled again.

Bouchard, and his son Renaud, accompanied Hugh Capet to the monastery of Souvigny in 996. He donated Gometz-le-Châtel and Ferté-Choisel to the bishopric of Paris.

== Death ==
After having retired to the abbaye of Saint-Maur-des-Fossés, Bouchard died 27 February 1005. His son Renaud, bishop of Paris, inherited the counties of Vendôme and Melun. Following Renaud's death, Fulk Nerra and Elisabeth's daughter, Adele, inherited Vendôme.

== Family ==
Bouchard and Elisabeth had:

- Bouchard, Viscount of Melun (died before his father)
- Élisabeth, known as Adèle, married to Fulk Nerra, she burned to death in the year 1000 Her and Fulk's daughter, Adele, inherited Vendôme following her uncle Renaud's death.
- Renaud, chancellor of France on 20 June 988/989; Bishop of Paris, Count of Vendôme

== Sources ==
- Bachrach, Bernard S. (1993). Fulk Nerra, the Neo-Roman Consul 987-1040. University of California Press.
- Barthélemy, Dominique (2006). Caballeros y milagros: Violencia y sacralidad en la sociedad feudal (in Spanish). Universidad de Granada.
- Bordonove, Georges (1986). Hugues Capet, le fondateur (in French). Pygmalion.
- Crouch, David (2015). The Birth of Nobility : Constructing Aristocracy in England and France, 900-1300. Routledge.
- Fanning, Steven (1988). A Bishop and His World Before the Gregorian Reform: Hubert of Angers, 1006-1047. Vol. 78, Issue 1. American Philosophical Society.
- Palgrave, Francis (1921). Palgrave, R.H. Inglis (ed.). The Collected Historical Works of Sir Francis Palgrave, K.H. Vol. 3. Cambridge University Press.
- Webster, Paul, ed. (2021). History of the Dukes of Normandy and the Kings of England by the Anonymous of Baethune. Routledge.
