= Henry Roberts (engraver) =

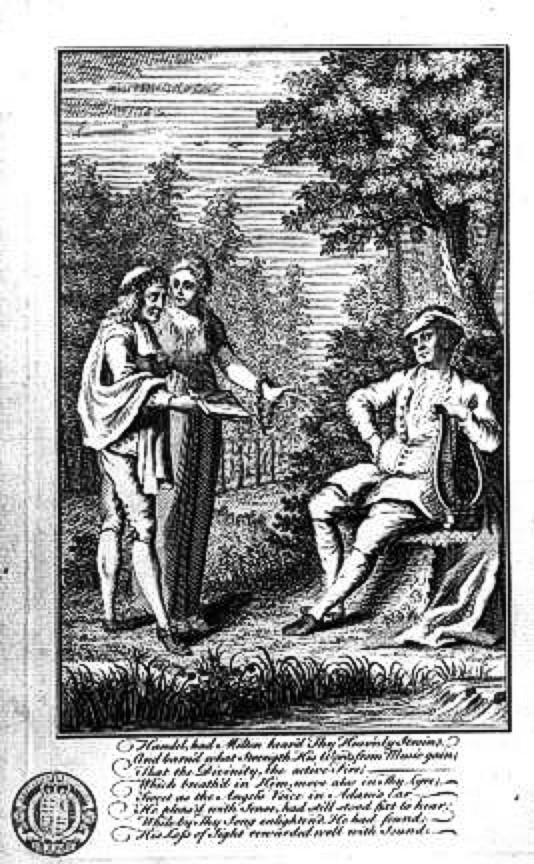
Milton, led by the muse Calliope, presenting his works to Handel

Henry Roberts was an English engraver, printseller and music publisher operating from London in the 18th century.

In 1739 he published a work called Calliope or English Harmony, which he described as:

a collection of the most celebrated English and Scots songs, neatly engrav'd and embelish'd with designs adapted to the subject of each song taken from the compositions of the best masters, in the most correct manner with the thorough bass and transpositions for the flute proper for all teachers, scholars, and lovers of musick; printed on a fine paper, on each side which renders the undertaking more compleat than any thing of the kind ever publish'd

The composer Thomas Arne lodged a Bill of Complaint with the Chancery in 1741, claiming that Henry Roberts and John Johnson had infringed his musical copyright by publishing some of his theatrical songs. The matter was settled out of court, the first known case of a composer asserting intellectual copyright.

Beginning in 1758, and continuing until 1780, John Welcker of London published the three volumes of Clio & Euterpe or British Harmony, a collection of 600 pages of songs from the 18th century adorned with detailed engravings, and sold them in his "Music and Instrument Warehouse" across from the Opera House. Copies are found in the hands of book collectors, in the Library of Congress, in the University of Edinburgh Library, in the Yale University Library and in the Harvard University Library.

The contralto Emma Curtis accompanied by The Frolick produced an album of music from Calliope in 2006.
