= Jean-Baptiste-Pierre Courcelles =

Genealogist and historian

- Born: Jean-Baptiste-Pierre Jullien de Courcelles; 14 September 1759; Orléans, France
- Died: 24 July 1834 (aged 74); Saint-Brieuc, Brittany
- Occupations: genealogist, historian

Jean-Baptiste-Pierre Jullien de Courcelles (14 September 1759 – 24 July 1834) was a French historian and genealogist. He was born in Orléans and died at Saint-Brieuc, now in the Côtes d'Armor département of Brittany. He published several historical and genealogical works, and was a correspondent of the Société académique d'Orléans. He was chief administrator of the charitable Asile Royal de la Providence in Paris, president of the hospices of Orléans, and a knight of the Papal Order of the Golden Spur.

== Publications ==
The principal works of Courcelles are:

- Dictionnaire historique et biographique des généraux français depuis le XIe siècle, Paris: l'auteur, 1820–1823. In nine volumes:

- Volume 1; Volume 2; Volume 3; Volume 4; Volume 5; Volume 6; Volume 7; Volume 8; Volume 9

- Dictionnaire universel de la noblesse de France, Paris: au bureau général de la noblesse de France, 1820–1822. In five volumes:

- Volume 1, A–L; Volume 2, M–Z; Volume 3, A–M (supplement); Volume 4, N-Z (supplement); Volume 5 A-Z (supplement)

- Histoire généalogique et héraldique des pairs de France, des grands dignitaires de la couronne, des principales familles nobles du royaume, et des maisons princières de l'Europe, Paris: l'auteur, 1822–1833. In twelve volumes:

- Volume 1; Volume 2; Volume 3; Volume 4; Volume 5; Volume 6; Volume 7; Volume 8; Volume 9; Volume 10; Volume 11; Volume 12
