= François de Vendôme, duc de Beaufort =

François de Vendôme
- Duke of Beaufort
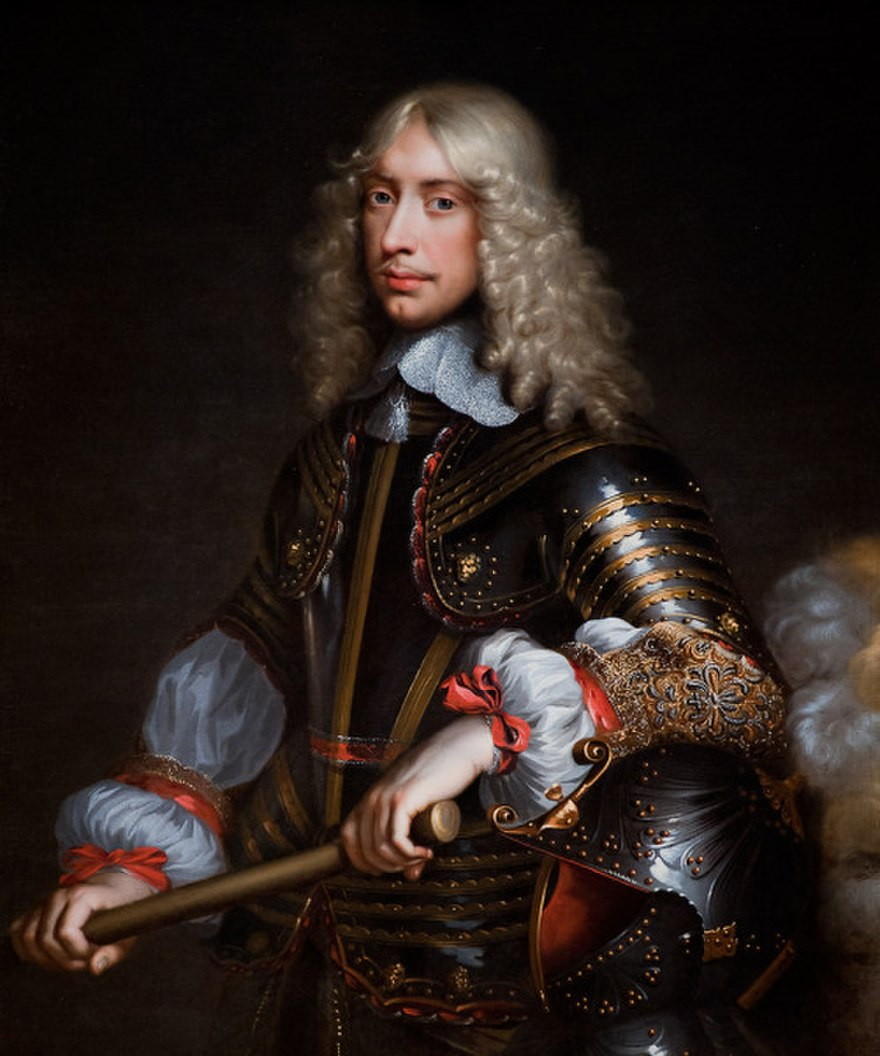
- Portrait by Jean Nocret
- Born: 16 January 1616; Château de Coucy, Picardy, France
- Died: 25 June 1669 (aged 53); Candia, Crete
Names
- François de Bourbon
- House: Bourbon-Vendôme
- Father: César de Bourbon
- Mother: Françoise de Lorraine

François de Vendôme, duc de Beaufort (16 January 1616 – 25 June 1669) was the son of César, Duke of Vendôme, and Françoise de Lorraine. He was a prominent figure in the Fronde, and later went on to fight in the Mediterranean. He is sometimes called François de Vendôme, though he was born into the House of Bourbon, Vendôme coming from his father's title of Duke of Vendôme.

In March 1665 he led a small fleet which defeated a small Algerian fleet near the Goletta, Tunisia (Action of March 1665). In 1669 he led the newly arrived French troops defending Candia against the Ottoman Turks, and was presumed to have been killed in a night sortie, on 25 June 1669. His body was brought back to France for a state funeral.

== Biography ==
François was the second son of César de Vendôme and Françoise of Lorrain-Mercoeur. His father was an illegitimate son of King Henry IV of France by his mistress, Gabrielle d'Estrées. He began his career in the army and served in the first campaigns of the Thirty Years' War, but his ambitions and unscrupulous character soon found a more congenial field in the intrigues of the court. In 1642 he joined in the conspiracy of Cinq Mars against Cardinal Richelieu, and upon its failure was obliged to live in exile in England until Richelieu's death.

Returning to France, Beaufort became the centre of a group, known as the "cabale des Importants", in which court ladies predominated, especially the Duchess of Chevreuse and the Duchess of Montbazon. For an instant after the king's death, this group seemed likely to prevail, and Beaufort to be the head of the new government. Cardinal Mazarin gained the office, and Beaufort, accused of a plot to murder Mazarin, was imprisoned in Vincennes, in September 1643.

Beaufort escaped from prison on 31 May 1648, just in time to join the Fronde, which began in August 1648. He was then with Parliament and the princes, against Mazarin. His personal appearance, his affectation of popular manners, and his status as a grandson (legitimized) of Henry IV rendered him a favourite of the Parisians, who acclaimed him everywhere. He was known as the Roi des Halles ("king of the markets"), and popular subscriptions were opened to pay his debts. He had hopes of becoming prime minister. But among the members of Parliament and the other leaders of the Fronde, he was regarded as merely a tool. His intelligence was but mediocre, and he showed no talent during the war.

He killed his sister's husband, Charles-Amédée of Savoy, in a duel in 1652.

Mazarin, on his return to Paris, exiled Beaufort in October 1652; and he was only allowed to return in 1654, when the cardinal had no longer any reason to fear him. Thenceforth Beaufort no longer intrigued. In 1658 he was named general superintendent of navigation, or chief of the naval army, and faithfully served the king in naval wars from that on. In 1664 he directed the expedition against the pirates of Algiers. In 1669, during the siege of Candia he led the French troops defending Candia against the Turks, and was killed in a night sortie, on 25 June 1669. His body was brought back to France with great pomp, and official honours rendered it.

== Depictions in fiction ==
Beaufort is one of the characters of Twenty Years After and The Vicomte de Bragelonne, Alexandre Dumas's sequels to The Three Musketeers. The first book chronicles his escape on Whitsunday - plotted by Athos - and lampoons his tendency to utter malapropisms.

He also appears in Le Roi Soleil, a French musical which opened in Paris in 2005 where he was played by Merwan Rim. Beaufort is also one of the main characters in the trilogy Secret d'État, by French novelist Juliette Benzoni.
