= Laura Mancini =

- Duchess of Mercœur; Duchess of Vendôme
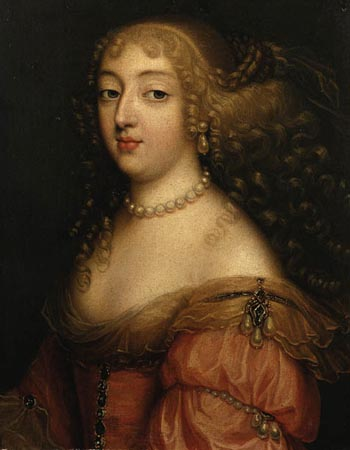
- Mancini by an unknown artist
- Born: 6 May 1636; Rome, Papal States
- Died: 8 February 1657 (aged 20); Paris, France
- Spouse: Louis, Duke of Vendôme (m. 1651)
- Issue: Louis Joseph, Duke of Vendôme; Philippe, Duke of Vendôme
Names
- Italian: Laura Vittoria Mancini; French: Laure Victoire Mancini
- Father: Lorenzo Mancini
- Mother: Girolama Mazzarini

Laura Mancini, Duchess of Mercœur (6 May 1636 – 8 February 1657) was a niece of Cardinal Mazarin. She was the eldest of the five famous Mancini sisters, who, along with two of their female Martinozzi cousins, were known at the French court of Louis XIV as the Mazarinettes. She married Louis de Bourbon, Duke of Vendôme, grandson of King Henry IV and was the mother of the great general, the Duke of Vendôme.

== Biography ==
Laura was the eldest daughter of Baron Lorenzo Mancini, brother-in-law of Cardinal Mazarin through his wife Girolama Mazzarini. She received the name Vittoria in honour of her paternal grandmother, Vittoria Capoccii. The eldest of ten children, through the influence of her uncle, the personal advisor of Louis XIII, Laura and her family were invited to France, leaving Rome in 1653 following the death of her father, along with their cousins Laura and Anna Maria. The family resided in the Palais Royal in Paris, home of Queen Anne and her sons Louis XIV and Philippe, Duke of Orléans.

Laura's four sisters were:

1. Olympe (1638–1708) married Eugene Maurice, Count of Soissons, mother of the famous general Eugene of Savoy.
2. Marie (1639–1715) first love of Louis XIV, wife of Prince Lorenzo Onofrio Colonna.
3. Hortense (1646–1699) married Armand Charles de La Porte de La Meilleraye and mistress of Charles II of England.
4. Marie Anne (1649–1714) married Maurice Godefroy de la Tour d'Auvergne, Duke of Bouillon, nephew of Turenne.

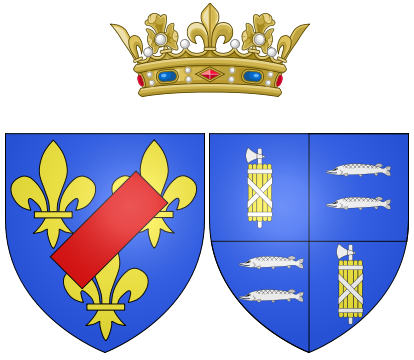
Coat of arms of Laura Mancini as Duchess of Mercœur

The Mancinis also had three brothers: Paul (1636-1652), Philippe, Duke of Nevers (1641-1707), and Alphonse (1644-1658). Originally engaged to Louis Charles de Nogaret de La Valette, Duke of Candale, son of the Duke of Épernon, the match did not take place, and she was instead married to Louis de Bourbon, Duke of Mercœur when she was 14. 38-year-old Louis was the son of the Duke of Vendôme, himself an illegitimate son of Henri IV of France and the famous Gabrielle d'Estrées.

Laura married Louis at the Palais Royal in the French capital on 4 February 1651 and thus became Duchess of Mercœur. Having married a legitimised prince of the blood, Laura was allowed the style of Serene Highness. However, she had a lower rank than that of her cousin, the Princess of Conti, who had married a legitimate prince. The older duke was instantly enamoured with his wife, and his affections were returned. Three sons followed in quick succession the eldest of which being a famous commander in the wars of the Grand Alliance and Spanish Succession. Laura died as a result of childbirth to Jules César, named after his grandfather and the Cardinal, in 1657. Born on 27 January, the Duchess died a fortnight later on 7 February. Buried in Paris, her husband retired from public life to become a cardinal, ensuring his children's upbringing to Laura's sister, the Duchess of Bouillon.

== Issue ==
1. Louis Joseph, Duke of Vendôme (1654–1712) married Marie Anne de Bourbon and died childless.
2. Philippe, Duke of Vendôme (1655–1727) prieur de Vendôme died unmarried.
3. Jules César (1657–1660) died in infancy.
