= Louis, Duke of Vendôme =

Louis
- Duke of Vendôme
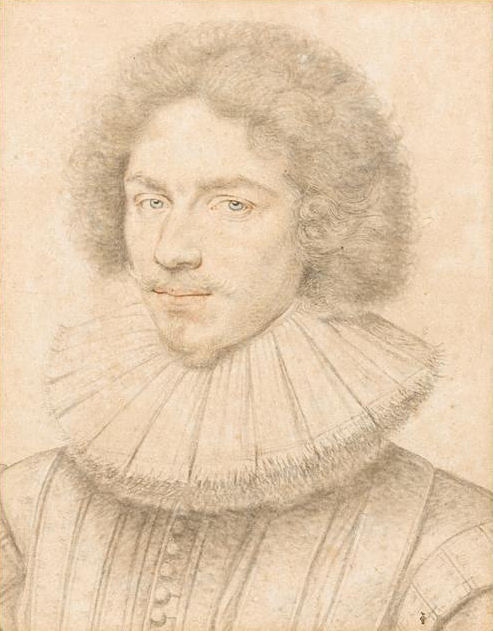
- Louis in 1630, by Daniel Dumonstier
- Born: October 1612; Paris, France
- Died: 6 August 1669 (aged 56); Aix-en-Provence, France
- Spouse: Laura Mancini (m. 1651; died 1657)
- Issue: Louis Joseph, Duke of Vendôme; Philippe, Duke of Vendôme
Names
- Louis de Bourbon-Vendôme
- House: Bourbon-Vendôme
- Father: César de Bourbon
- Mother: Françoise de Lorraine
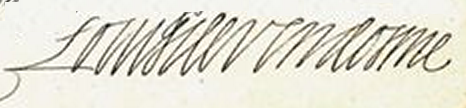
- Signature

Louis de Bourbon (October 1612 – 6 August 1669), was Duke of Mercœur and later the second Duke of Vendôme, and the grandson of Henry IV of France and Gabrielle d'Estrées. He became Duke of Vendôme in 1665, after the death of his father.

== Biography ==
Louis was the son of César de Bourbon, Légitimé de France, Duke of Vendôme and Françoise de Lorraine (1592–1669), daughter of Philippe Emmanuel, Duke of Mercœur (d. 1602).

Louis had a military career. He participated in the Reapers War and became French Viceroy of Catalonia between 1650-51. A series of military defeats and an anti-French revolt in the southern regions of Catalonia led to his desposition. After his return to France, he was Governor of Provence from 1653 to 1669. After the death of his wife in 1657, he entered the church and became a cardinal and legate of France. As a cardinal, he was styled as the cardinal de Vendôme.

== Marriage and issue ==
Louis married Laura Mancini, niece of Cardinal Mazarin, on 4 February 1651. Their children were:

1. Louis Joseph de Bourbon (1654–1712), Duke of Vendôme and Marshal of France; married Marie Anne de Bourbon; no issue
2. Philippe de Bourbon (1655–1727), called le prieur de Vendôme, last Duke of Vendôme; never married; no issue
3. Jules César de Bourbon (1657–1660) died in infancy

== See also ==
- Pavillon Vendôme

== Sources ==
- Kamen, Henry (2000). Who's who in Europe, 1450-1750. Routledge.
- Orr, Clarissa Campbell, ed. (2004). Queenship in Europe 1660-1815: The Role of the Consort. Cambridge University Press.
- Pitts, Vincent Joseph (2000). La Grande Mademoiselle at the Court of France: 1627-1693. Johns Hopkins University Press.

French nobility
Preceded by César	Duke of Mercœur; 1649–1669	Succeeded by Louis Joseph
Preceded by César	Duke of Vendôme; 1665–1669	Succeeded by Louis Joseph
