= Louis Joseph, Duke of Vendôme =

French noble and general (1654–1712)

Marshal of France Louis Joseph de Bourbon
- Duke of Vendôme
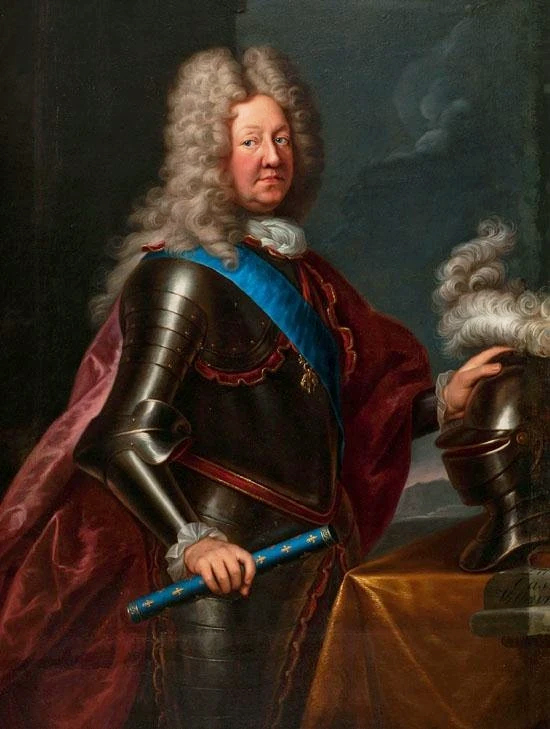
- Portrait attributed to Pedro Nuñez de Villavicencio
- Born: 1 July 1654; Paris, Kingdom of France
- Died: 11 June 1712 (aged 57); Vinaròs, Kingdom of Spain
- Buried: El Escorial, Spain
- Noble family: Bourbon-Vendôme
- Spouse: Marie Anne de Bourbon (m. 1710)
- Father: Louis, Duke of Vendôme
- Mother: Laura Mancini
- Military career
- Allegiance: Kingdom of France
- Rank: Marshal of France
- Conflicts: Nine Years' War; Battle of Steenkerque; Battle of Marsaglia; Siege of Barcelona; War of the Spanish Succession; Campaigns in Italy; Battle of Santa Vittoria; Battle of Luzzara; Battle of Cassano; Battle of Calcinato; Campaign in Flanders; Battle of Oudenarde; Siege of Lille; Campaigns in Spain; Battle of Brihuega; Battle of Villaviciosa

Louis Joseph de Bourbon, Duke of Vendôme, often simply called Vendôme (1 July 1654 – 11 June 1712) was a French general and Marshal of France. He was one of Louis XIV's most successful commanders in the War of the Grand Alliance and War of the Spanish Succession.

Vendôme joined the French Army and was promoted Lieutenant General in 1688 after his distinguished combat record in the Franco-Dutch War. Further successes entitled him to his first army command in 1695, and soon after, he was rewarded with a promotion to Marshal of France.

Vendôme was one of the most aggressive and successful French army commanders during the wars of Louis XIV. His charisma, courage and skill won him the loyalty of his troops and the Spanish crown for the House of Bourbon.

== Biography ==
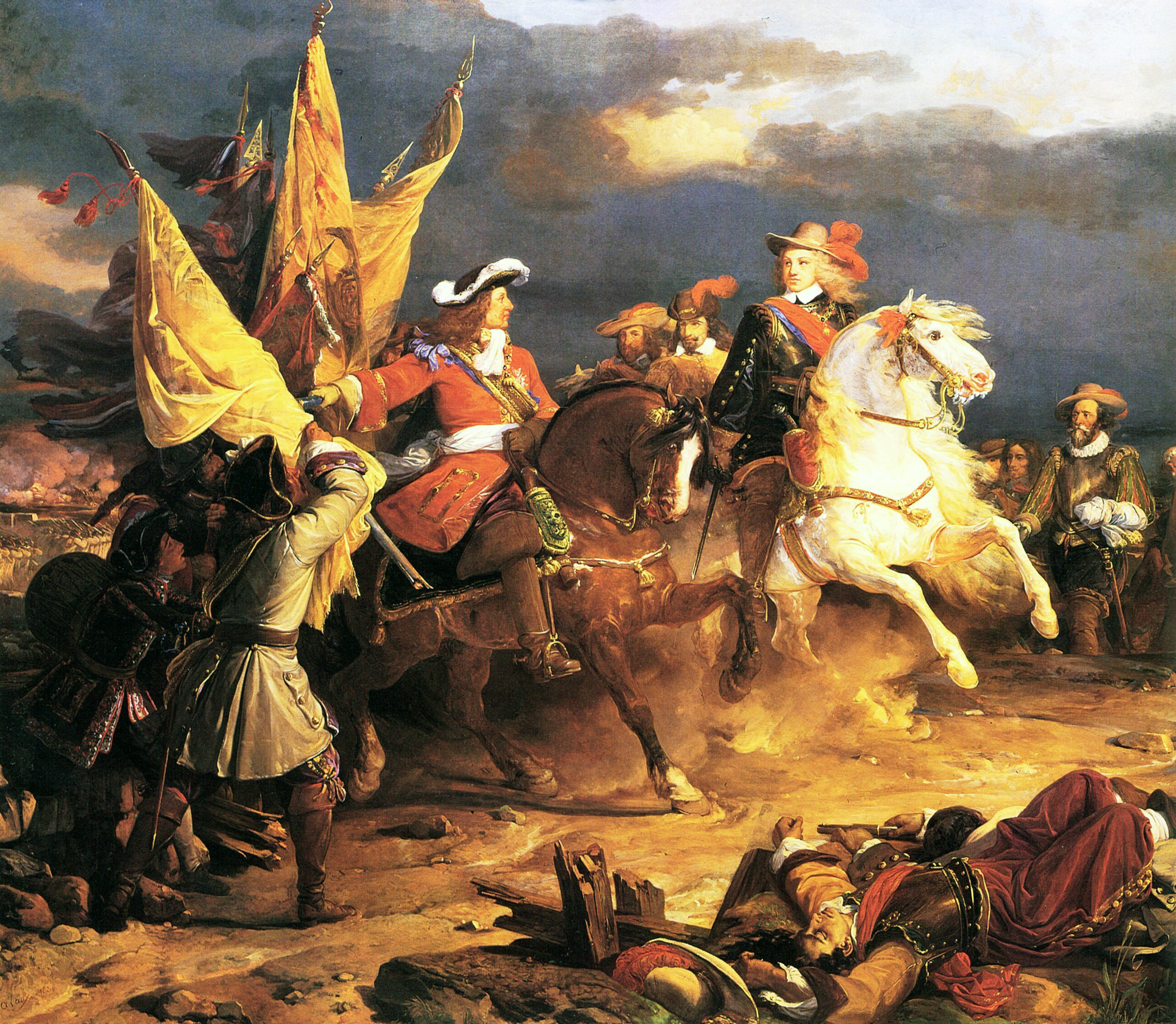
Vendôme (left) at the Battle of Villaviciosa

Louis Joseph de Bourbon was born in Paris, the son of Louis, Duke of Vendôme and Laura Mancini. Orphaned at the age of fifteen, he inherited a vast fortune from his father that had been handed down from his great-grandmother, the duchesse de Mercœur et Penthièvre. Prior to succeeding his father in 1669, he was known as the duc de Penthièvre. He was raised by his aunt, Marie Anne Mancini, duchesse de Bouillon.

Entering the army at the age of eighteen, Vendôme soon distinguished himself by his vigour and personal courage in the Dutch wars, and by 1688, he had risen to the rank of lieutenant-general. In the Nine Years' War, he rendered conspicuous service under the duc de Luxembourg at the Battle of Steenkerke, and under Nicolas Catinat at Marsaglia. In 1695, he was placed in command of the army operating in Catalonia, where he took Barcelona in 1697.

Soon afterwards, Vendome was made a Marshal of France. In 1702, after the first unsuccessful campaign of Catinat and Villeroi, he was placed in command of the Franco-Spanish army in Italy. During three campaigns in that country, he proved himself a worthy antagonist to Prince Eugène of Savoy, fighting him to a draw at Luzzara, capturing Vercelli, and defeating him in 1705 at Cassano.

The next year, after holding his own as before, and gaining another victory at Calcinato, he was sent to Flanders to repair the disaster of Ramillies. Following the departure of Vendôme to shore up the shattered army in the Flanders, Prince Eugène and the Duke of Savoy inflicted a heavy loss on the French under the duc d'Orléans and Ferdinand de Marsin at the Battle of Turin, driving the French out of Italy by the end of the year. In Flanders, meanwhile, Vendôme quarrelled with the king's unenterprising grandson, Louis, Duke of Burgundy, and was unable to prevent the French defeat at the Battle of Oudenarde.

In disgust, Vendôme retired to his estates. It was not long, however, before he was summoned back to take command of the army of his cousin, Philip V of Spain. There, he won his last victories, crowning his work triumphantly in the battles of Brihuega and Villaviciosa. Before the end of the war, he died suddenly at Vinaròs on 11 June 1712 and was buried at El Escorial in Spain.

=== Assessment ===
Vendôme was a remarkable soldier in the history of the French army. He had the skill and imagination to successfully lead in the army leader, demonstrating his courage and influence over his men. His opponent Eugene of Savoy praised the brilliance of some of his actions in his memoirs.

== Marriage ==
Vendôme married Marie Anne de Bourbon, a daughter of Henri Jules, Prince of Condé and Anne Henriette of Bavaria.

Marie Anne was unmarried at the time of her father’s death, and still had no marriage prospects when her brother, who became the Prince of Condé in 1709, died the next year. She could have married the duc du Maine in 1692, but Maine preferred Marie Anne's sister, Anne Louise Bénédicte de Bourbon, and married her instead.

The marriage ceremony occurred at the chapel at the Château de Sceaux on 21 May 1710. Sceaux was the residence of Anne Louise Bénédicte de Bourbon. Louis Joseph was fifty-five years old at the time. He was a Marshal of France and had been designated as the heir of his cousin, King Philip V of Spain. In the event that Philip should die childless, the House of Bourbon had decided that Louis Joseph would become the next king of Spain.

His marriage to Marie Anne remained childless though, perhaps due to Louis Joseph's homosexuality; Marie Anne died in 1718 without issue.

Although Louis XIV had given permission for the marriage, the manipulative duc and duchesse du Maine hurriedly arranged the details of the wedding, probably for mercenary reasons. Even though the Dowager Princess of Condé was not informed of the marriage, she was present at the bedding ceremony at Sceaux along with Louis Henri, Duke of Bourbon, his wife Marie Anne de Bourbon, the Dowager Princess of Conti, and her children the Prince of Conti and Mademoiselle de La Roche-sur-Yon.

On his death, Louis Joseph left his wife the duchy of Étampes and its lands. She held this title in her own right. When she died, it went to her niece, the Princess of Conti.

== Sexuality ==
The Duke was known to be homosexual. Other members of his family, including his brother Philippe and his grandfather César, Duke of Vendôme, were also known for their homosexuality/bisexuality, which led to the family mansion on Place Vendôme being called the Hôtel de Sodome in the 17th century. According to Saint-Simon, Louis-Joseph "plunged...more than anyone else" into sodomy, satisfying his desires with "his valets and officers". Those who wished to curry favor with Vendôme would try and win over his lovers first. One contemporary account alleges that on his estate at the Chateau d'Anet, peasant men from the neighborhood would wait for the Duke in the woods when he went out hunting, hoping to be paid for sexual favors.

Louis-Joseph suffered from syphilis and lost part of his nose to the disease. He was the first courtier to seek leave from court to be treated for the disease with Mercury salts, known as the "Great Remedy" (le grand remède).

== Sources ==
- Godard, Didier (2020). Who's Who in Gay and Lesbian History. Taylor & Francis. p. 542. ISBN 9781000158885.
- Holmes, Richard, ed. (2001). The Oxford Companion to Military History. Oxford University Press. ISBN 0-19-866209-2.
- Ladurie, Emmanuel Le Roy; Fitou, Jean-François (2001). Saint-Simon and the Court of Louis XIV. University of Chicago Press. p. 109. ISBN 9780226473208.
- Merrick, Jeffrey; Sibalis, Michael (2013). Homosexuality in French History. Taylor & Francis. p. 41. ISBN 9781317992585.
- Oresko, Robert (2004). "Maria Giovanna Battista of Savoy-Nemours (1644-1724): daughter, consort, and Regent of Savoy". In Orr, Clarissa Campbell (ed.). Queenship in Europe 1660-1815: The Role of the Consort. Cambridge University Press. ISBN 0 521 81422 7.
- Saint-Simon, Louis de Rouvroy duc de. (1990). Coirault, Yves (ed.). Mémoires. Textes choisis (in French). Vol. 1. Gallimard. ISBN 978-2070382347.

French nobility
Preceded by Louis	Duke of Vendôme; 1669–1712	Succeeded by Philippe
