= List of counts and dukes of Vendôme =

Counts of Vendôme

Count of Vendôme and, later, Duke of Vendôme were titles of French nobility. The first-known holder of the comital title was Bouchard Ratepilate. The county passed by marriage to various houses, coming in 1372 to a junior branch of the House of Bourbon. In 1514, Vendôme was made a duchy-peerage.

In 1589, the then Duke of Vendôme came to the throne as Henry IV of France, and the title passed into the royal domain. It was re-granted to his illegitimate son César in 1598, and held by his descendants until the extinction of the legitimate male line in 1727.

The title was later revived by Orléanist claimants to the throne of France as a courtesy title.

== Counts of Vendôme ==
=== Bouchardides ===
- Bouchard Ratepilate (c. 930 – 956...967)
- Bouchard I (956...967–1005), also Count of Paris and Count of Corbeil by marriage
- Renaud (1005–1017), Bishop of Paris 991–1017

=== House of Nevers ===
- Bodon of Nevers (1017–1023), by marriage to Adèle de Vendôme-Anjou, daughter of Fulk III of Anjou and Elisabeth de Vendôme, daughter of Bouchard I
- Bouchard II (1023–1028)
  - under the regency of Fulk III of Anjou (1023–1027)
- shared between Adèle de Vendôme-Anjou and Fulk de Vendôme (1028–1032)

=== House of Anjou ===
- Geoffrey I (1032–1056), also Count of Anjou (succeeded Adèle by cession and drove out Fulk)

=== House of Nevers ===
- Fulk de Vendôme (1056–1066), reinstated by Henry I of France
- Bouchard III (1066–1085)
  - under the regency of Guy of Nouastre (1066–1075)

=== House of Preuilly ===
Arms of the house of Preuilly

- Geoffrey II (1085–1102), Lord of Preuilly, married Euphrosine, daughter of Fulk of Vendôme
- Geoffrey III (1102–1137)
  - under the regency (1102–1105) of Euphrosine
- John I (1137–1180)
- Bouchard IV (1180–1202)
- John II (1202–1211)
  - under the regency (1202–1211) of Geoffrey, son of John I
- John III 1211–1217

=== House of Montoire ===
Arms of the house of Montoire

- John IV (1217–1230), Lord of Montoire, grandson of Bouchard IV
- Peter I (1230–1249)
- Bouchard V (1249–1270)
- John V (1271–1315)
- Bouchard VI (1315–1354)
- John VI (1354–1364)
- Bouchard VII (1364–1371)
- Joanna (1371–1372)
  - under the regency of her grandmother Joanna of Ponthieu (1371–1372)
- Catherine (1372–1403)
  - with John I of Bourbon-La Marche (1372–1393)
  - with Louis I of Bourbon-Vendôme (1393–1403)

=== House of Bourbon ===
Arms of the house of Bourbon-Vendome

- Louis I (1403–1446)
- John II (1446–1477)
- Francis I (1477–1495)
  - under the regency of Louis of Joyeuse (1477–1484)
- Charles IV (1495–1514), title raised to Duke of Vendôme and entered the peerage in 1514

=== English Counts of Vendôme ===
- Robert Willoughby, 6th Baron Willoughby de Eresby (1424–1430), created Count of Vendôme by John, Duke of Bedford as regent for Henry VI of England as King of France

== Dukes of Vendôme ==
Arms of the original Bourbon-Vendôme house

=== House of Bourbon ===
- Charles IV (1514–1537), previously Count of Vendôme
- Antoine I (1537–1562), son of, King of Navarre from 1555
- Henry I (1562–1607), son of, King of France from 1589; the duchy became part of the royal domain after the Edict of 1607

=== House of Bourbon-Vendôme ===
Arms of the second Bourbon-Vendôme house

- César (1598–1665), illegitimate son of Henry IV of France by Gabrielle d'Estrées, born in 1594 and legitimized in 1596 (founder of the second house of Bourbon-Vendôme)
- Louis (1612–1669), son of César, Duke of Vendôme
- Louis Joseph I (1669–1712), son of Louis, Duke of Vendôme
- Philippe (1712–1727), second son of Louis, Duke of Vendôme, Grand Prior of the Order of Malta in France

The Vendôme name was annexed into the royal domain by Louis XIV in 1712, on the pretext that Philippe's membership in the Order of Malta as Grand Prior of France prevented him from holding it, but he retained the title.

=== Courtesy title ===
The title was revived by Orléanist claimants to the throne of France as a courtesy title. However, it is invalid in French law.

- Emmanuel (I) (1872–1931)
- John (IX) (born 1965), became Count of Paris in 2019 after the death of his father Henri, Count of Paris
