= César, Duke of Vendôme =

César
- Duke of Vendôme
- French School, 17th Century
- Born: 3 June 1594; Château de Coucy, Picardy, France
- Died: 22 October 1665 (aged 71); Paris, France
- Spouse: Françoise de Lorraine (m. 1608)
- Issue Detail: Louis, Duke of Vendôme; François, Duke of Beaufort; Élisabeth, Duchess of Nemours
Names
- César de Bourbon
- House: Bourbon-Vendôme
- Father: Henry IV of France
- Mother: Gabrielle d'Estrées

César de Bourbon, Légitimé de France (June 1594 – 22 October 1665) was the illegitimate son of Henry IV of France and his mistress Gabrielle d'Estrées, and founder of the House of Bourbon-Vendome. He held the titles of 1st Duke of Vendôme, 2nd Duke of Beaufort and 2nd Duke of Étampes, but is also simply known as César de Vendôme.

== Biography ==
Born in June 1594 at the Château de Coucy in the Picardy region of France, César was the illegitimate son of Henry IV of France and his mistress Gabrielle d'Estrées and was the couple's first child. He was legitimised on 3 February 1595, and was created the first Duke of Vendôme by his father in 1598. In the same year, he was engaged to Françoise de Lorraine, "..the wealthiest heiress in France".

In 1598, César was created Duke of Vendome in his own right. One year later he also inherited the titles of Duke of Beaufort and Duke of Étampes upon the death of his mother, who died as a result of a stillbirth in Paris.

He was his father's first son but due to his illegitimacy, was not allowed to inherit the throne; his half-brother, the future Louis XIII, was born in September 1601, much to the joy of the king.

On 16 July 1608, at the Château de Fontainebleau, Cesar married Françoise de Lorraine, the wealthy heiress of Philippe Emmanuel, Duke of Mercœur. Françoise was the legal heir to the large and separate duchies of Mercœur and Penthièvre. In 1610, Cesar's father granted him a rank higher than peers of the realm but below princes of the blood (prince du sang).

Coat-of-arms for César, Duke of Vendôme.

César was involved in many noble intrigues during the reign of his half-brother Louis XIII. In 1614, whilst Governor of Brittany, he briefly supported Henri, Prince of Conde in demanding the summoning of the Estates General and the removal of several of Louis' ministers, before submitting to the young king when he came with a force to Nantes. Later implicated in the Chalais conspiracy against Cardinal Richelieu, he and his brother Alexandre, Chevalier de Vendôme, were imprisoned in the Château de Vincennes in 1626. He was released in 1630.

In 1632, he returned to France but was soon accused of plotting the death of Richelieu and was exiled again, first to Holland then to England. He did not return until 1642. Soon after his return he took part in the cabale des Importants against Cardinal Mazarin, together with his second son François - this led to yet another exile, till 1650. The marriage of his son Louis to Laura Mancini brought about his reconciliation with Mazarin, and he supported Anne of Austria throughout the Fronde.

He reconciled with his half-brother in December 1642, a year before his death and the accession of his nephew Louis XIV. The reconciliation occurred after the death of Richelieu.

César led the royal troops against the rebels in Burgundy, of which he was appointed governor in 1650; appointed Grand Admiral of France in 1651 he helped to capture the insurgent stronghold of Bordeaux in July 1653. Joining French forces in the ongoing war with Spain, he defeated a Spanish fleet off Barcelona in 1655.

Early in 1665 the Duke of Vendôme was created the Grand Master of Navigation. He died later that year on 22 October 1665 in Paris and was buried in the chapel of Saint-Georges at the Château of Vendôme.

== Issue ==
Cesar and Françoise had:

- Louis de Bourbon, 2nd Duke of Vendôme married Laura Mancini
- François de Bourbon, 2nd Duke of Beaufort
- Élisabeth de Bourbon, Mademoiselle de Vendôme, married in Paris on 11 July 1643 Charles Amédée of Savoy, Duke of Nemours

== Sources ==
- Collins, James B. (1994). Classes, Estates and Order in Early-Modern Brittany. Cambridge University Press.
- Gerber, Matthew (2012). Bastards: Politics, Family, and Law in Early Modern France. Oxford University Press.
- Greengrass, Mark (2015). Christendom Destroyed: Europe 1517-1648. Penguin Books.
- James, Alan (2004). The Navy and Government in Early Modern France, 1572-1661. The Boydell Press.
- Kamen, Henry (2000). Who's who in Europe, 1450-1750. Routledge.
- Mansel, Philip (2019). King of the World: The Life of Louis XIV. University of Chicago Press.xxx
- Moote, A. Lloyd (1989). Louis XIII, the Just. University of California Press. ISBN 978-0-520-06485-0.
- Orr, Clarissa Campbell, ed. (2004). Queenship in Europe 1660-1815: The Role of the Consort. Cambridge University Press.
- Rowlands, Guy (2002). The Dynastic State and the Army under Louis XIV: Royal Service and Private Interest, 1661-1701. Cambridge University Press.
- Swann, Julian (2017). Exile, Imprisonment, Or Death: The Politics of Disgrace in Bourbon France, 1610-1789. Oxford University Press.
- Wellman, Kathleen (2013). Queens and Mistresses of Renaissance France. Yale University Press.

French nobility
New creation	Duke of Vendôme; 1598–1665	Succeeded by Louis II
Preceded by Gabrielle d'Estrées	Duke of Étampes; 1599–1665	Succeeded by Louis II
Preceded by Gabrielle d'Estrées	Duke of Beaufort; 1599–1665	Succeeded by François
