= French Revolutionary Army =

Army of Revolutionary France

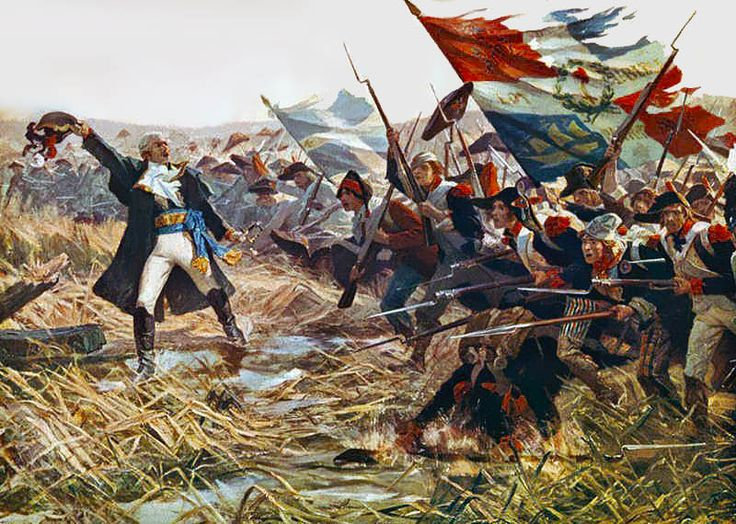
- General Dampierre leading French troops in the Battle of Jemappes in 1792, depicted in an early 20th century painting
- Active: 1792–1804
- Country: French Republic, and European èmigré groups.
- Allegiance: French First Republic
- Motto: Honneur et Patrie
- Engagements: Quasi-War; Haitian Revolution; War of the First Coalition; War of the Second Coalition

Commanders
- Notable commanders: See list: Napoleon Bonaparte; Pierre Augereau; Guillaume Brune; Auguste Marie Henri Picot de Dampierre; Louis Desaix; Jacques François Dugommier; Thomas-Alexandre Dumas; Lazare Hoche; Jean Nicolas Houchard; Jean Joseph Amable Humbert; Barthélemy Catherine Joubert; Jean-Baptiste Jourdan; François Christophe de Kellermann; Jean-Baptiste Kléber; Jean Lannes; François Joseph Lefebvre; André Masséna; Jean Victor Marie Moreau; Jean-Charles Pichegru; Jean-Mathieu-Philibert Sérurier; Joseph Souham; Jean-de-Dieu Soult; Étienne Jacques-Joseph-Alexandre Macdonald

The French Revolutionary Army (French: Armée révolutionnaire française) was the French land force that fought the French Revolutionary Wars from 1792 to 1802. In the beginning, the French armies were characterised by their revolutionary fervour, their poor equipment and their great numbers. However, the French Revolutionary Army had become arguably the most powerful army in the world by the mid-1790s, as the French armies had become well-experienced and organized, enabling them to comfortably outfight their enemies.

Despite experiencing early disastrous defeats, the revolutionary armies successfully expelled foreign forces from French soil and then overran many neighboring countries, establishing client republics. Leading generals included Napoleon Bonaparte, Jean-Baptiste Jourdan, André Masséna, Jean Victor Marie Moreau and Étienne Macdonald.

As a general description of French military forces during this period, it should not be confused with the "revolutionary armies" (armées révolutionnaires) which were paramilitary forces set up during the Terror. Following the proclamation of the French Empire in 1804 the Revolutionary Army became the Imperial Army.

== Formation ==
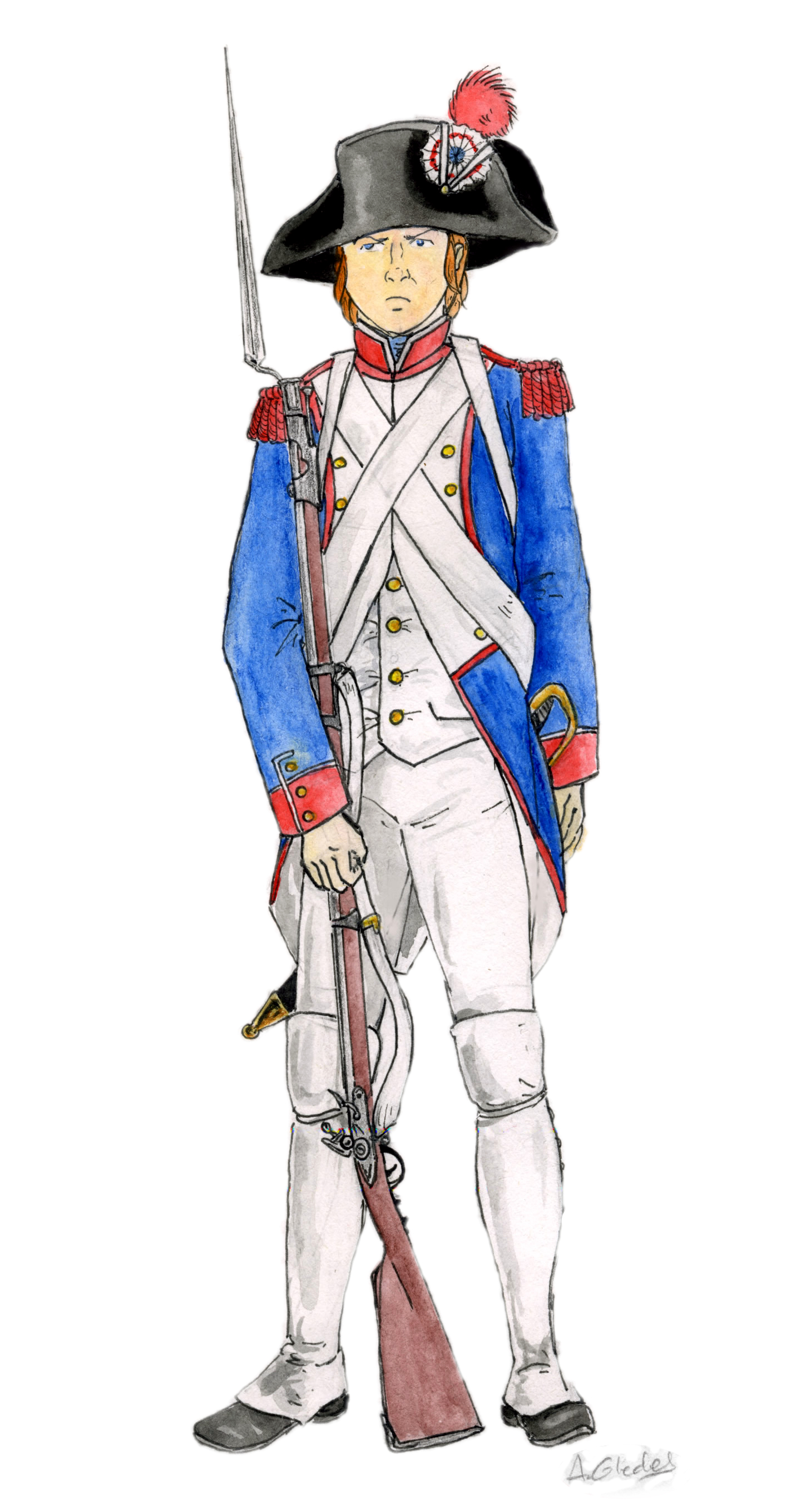
French line grenadier during the Revolution

As the Ancien Régime gave way to a constitutional monarchy, and then to a republic, 1789–92, the entire structure of France was transformed to fall into line with the Revolutionary principles of "Liberty, Equality and Fraternity". Reactionary Europe stood opposed, especially after the French king was executed. The signing of the Declaration of Pillnitz between Leopold II, Holy Roman Emperor and King Frederick William II of Prussia and the subsequent French declaration of war meant that from its formation, the Republic of France was at war, and it required a potent military force to ensure its survival. As a result, one of the first major elements of the French state to be restructured was the army.

Almost all of the officers of the French Royal Army had been drawn from the aristocracy. During the period preceding the final overthrow of the Monarchy, large numbers of officers left their regiments and emigrated. Between 15 September and 1 December 1791 alone, 2,160 officers of the royal army fled France eventually to join the émigré army of Louis Joseph, Prince of Condé. Of those who stayed, many were either imprisoned or killed during the Reign of Terror. The few remaining officers from the old guard were promoted swiftly; this meant that the majority of the Revolutionary officers were far younger than their Monarchist counterparts. The high-ranking aristocratic officers who remained, among them Marquis de la Fayette, Comte de Rochambeau and Count Nicolas Luckner, were soon accused of having monarchist sympathies and either executed or forced into exile.

Revolutionary fervour, along with calls to save the new regime, resulted in a large influx of enthusiastic, yet untrained and undisciplined, volunteers. These were the first sans-culottes, so called because they wore peasants' trousers rather than the knee-breeches used by the other armies of the time. France's desperate military situation meant that these men were quickly inducted into the army. One reason for the success of the French Revolutionary Army is the "amalgamation" (amalgame) strategy organized by military strategist Lazare Carnot, later Napoleon's Minister of War. He assigned, to the same regiment (but in different battalions), both young volunteers enthusiastic at the thought of dying for liberty and old veterans from the former royal army.

The transformation of the Army was most apparent in the officer corps. Before the revolution, 90% of the officers had been aristocrats, compared to only 3% in 1794. Revolutionary fervor was high, and was closely monitored by the Committee of Public Safety, which assigned Representatives on Mission to keep watch on the army generals. Indeed, during the war, some generals deserted, and others were removed or executed. The government demanded that soldiers be loyal to the government in Paris, not to their generals.

== 1791 Reglement ==
Officially, the Revolutionary Armies were operating along the guidelines set down in the 1791 Reglement, a set of regulations created during the years before the Revolution. The 1791 Reglement laid down several complex tactical maneuvers, maneuvers which demanded well trained soldiers, officers and NCOs to perform correctly. The Revolutionary Army was lacking in all three of these areas, and as a result the early efforts to conform to the 1791 Reglement were met with disaster. The untrained troops could not perform the complex maneuvers required, unit cohesion was lost and defeat was ensured.

Realizing that the army was not capable of conforming with the 1791 Reglement, commanders began experimenting with formations which required less training to perform. Many eminent French military thinkers had been clamoring for change decades before. In the period following the humiliating performance of the French Army during the Seven Years' War, they began to experiment with new ideas. Guibert wrote his epic Essai général de Tactique, Bourcet focused on staff procedures and mountain warfare, and Mesnil-Durand spent his time advocating l'ordre profond, tactics of maneuvering and fighting in heavy columnar formations, placing emphasis on the shock of cold steel over firepower.

In the 1770s, some commanders, among them the brilliant duc de Broglie performed exercises testing these tactics. It was finally decided to launch a series of experiments to try out the new tactics, and comparing them to the standard Fredrickian linear formation known as l'ordre mince which was universally popular throughout Europe. De Broglie decided that l'ordre profond worked best when it was supported by artillery and large numbers of skirmishers. Despite these exercises, l'ordre mince had strong and powerful supporters in the French Royal Army, and it was this formation which went into the 1791 Reglement as the standard.

== Trial by fire ==
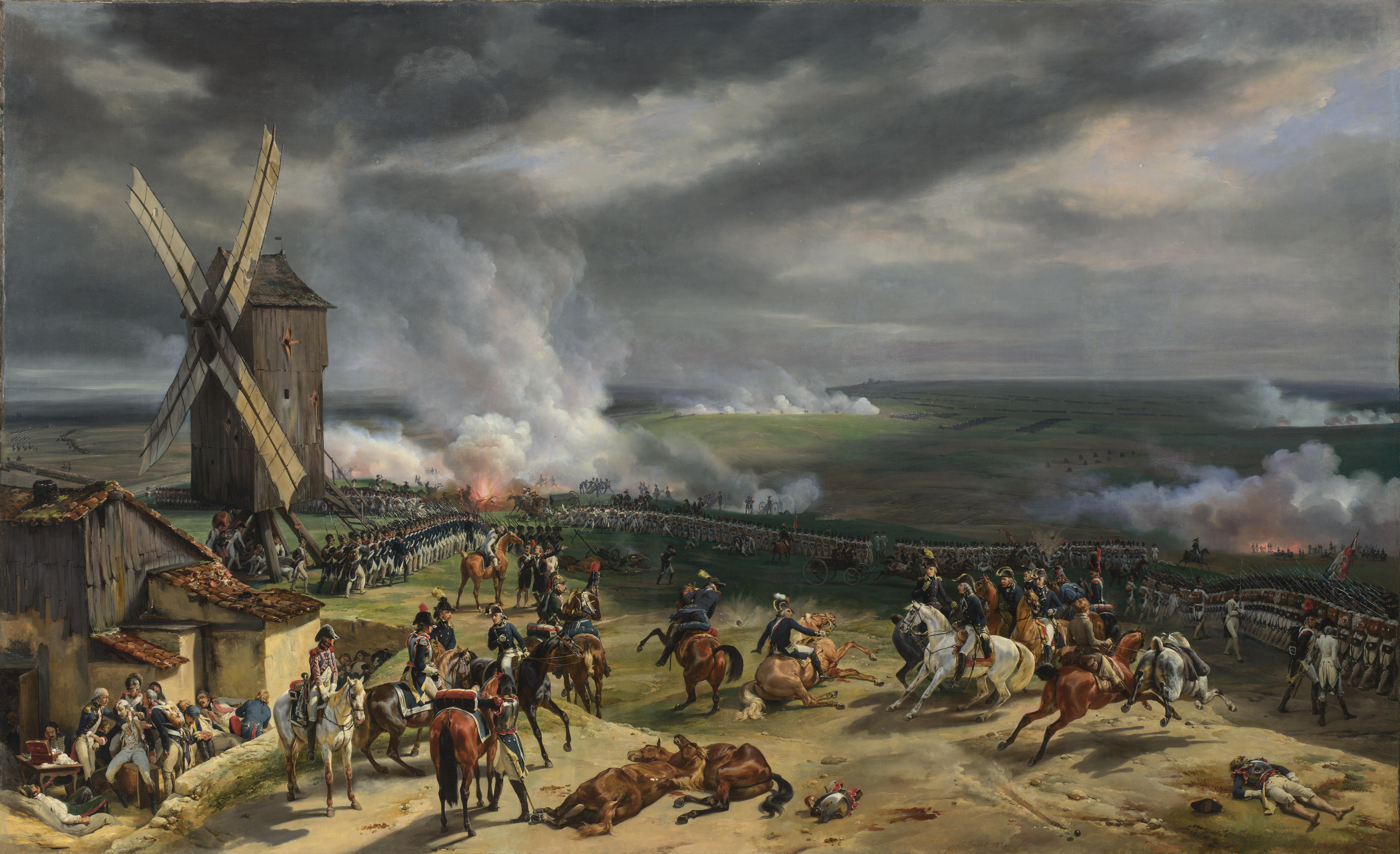
The Battle of Valmy (1792) was a decisive victory for the French.

The French struck first, with an invasion of the Austrian Netherlands proposed by foreign minister Charles François Dumouriez. This invasion soon turned into a debacle when it was found that the hastily trained Revolutionary forces were badly disorganized and disobedient: on one occasion, troops murdered their general to avoid a battle; on another, troops insisted on putting their commander's orders to a vote. The Revolutionary forces retreated from the Austrian Netherlands in disarray.

In August 1792, a large Austro-Prussian army commanded by the Duke of Brunswick crossed the frontier and began its march on Paris with the declared intention of restoring full power to Louis XVI. Several Revolutionary armies were easily defeated by the professional Austrian, Hessian, Brunswick and Prussian troops. The immediate result of this was the storming of the Tuileries Palace by an armed Parisian mob and the overthrow of the king. Successive Revolutionary forces failed to halt Brunswick's advance, and by mid-September it appeared that Paris would fall to the invading monarchists. The Convention ordered the remaining armies to be combined under the command of Dumouriez and François Christophe Kellermann. At the Battle of Valmy on 20 September 1792, the Revolutionary forces defeated Brunswick's advance guard, causing the invading army to begin a retreat all the way to the border. Much of the credit for the victory is owed to the French artillery, widely viewed as the best in Europe thanks to the technical improvements of Jean Baptiste Vaquette de Gribeauval.

The Battle of Valmy ensured that the Revolutionary armies were respected and no longer underestimated by their enemies. For the next ten years, these armies not only defended the fledgling French First Republic, but, under the command of Generals such as Moreau, Jourdan, Kléber, Desaix and Bonaparte, expanded the borders of the French republic.

== Lazare Carnot ==
While the Cannonade of Valmy had saved the Republic from imminent destruction and caused its enemies to take pause, the guillotining of Louis XVI in January 1793 and the National Convention's proclamation that it would 'export the revolution' hardened the resolve of France's enemies to destroy the Republic and reinstate a monarchy.

In early 1793, the First Coalition was formed, not only from Prussia and Austria, but also Sardinia, Naples, the Dutch Republic, Spain and Great Britain. The Republic was under attack on several fronts, and in the fiercely Catholic region of La Vendée an armed revolt had broken out. The Revolutionary army was greatly overstretched, and it seemed that the fall of the republic was imminent.

In early 1793 Lazare Carnot, a prominent mathematician, physicist, and delegate to the convention, was promoted to the Committee of Public Safety. Displaying an exceptional talent for organization and for enforcing discipline, Carnot set about rearranging the disheveled Revolutionary Armies. Realizing that no amount of reforming and discipline was going to offset the massive numerical superiority enjoyed by France's enemies, Carnot ordered (24 February 1793 decree of the national Convention) each département to provide a quota of new recruits, a number totaling around 300,000. By mid-1793, the Revolutionary Army had increased around 645,000 men.

== Levée en masse ==
On 23 August 1793, at Carnot's insistence, the Convention issued the following proclamation ordering a levée en masse:

"From this moment until such time as its enemies shall have been driven from the soil of the Republic all Frenchmen are in permanent requisition for the services of the armies. The young men shall fight; the married men shall forge arms and transport provisions; the women shall make tents and clothes and shall serve in the hospitals; the children shall turn linen into lint; the old men shall betake themselves to the public squares in order to arouse the courage of the warriors and preach hatred of kings and the unity of the Republic"

All unmarried able bodied men aged between 18 and 25 were to report immediately for military service. Those married, as well as the remaining men, women and children, were to focus their efforts on arming and supplying the army.

This increased the size of the Revolutionary Armies dramatically, providing the armies in the field with the manpower to hold off the enemy attacks. Carnot was hailed by the government as the Organizer of Victory. By September 1794, the Revolutionary Army had 1,500,000 men under arms. Carnot's levée en masse had provided so much manpower that it was not necessary to repeat it again until 1797.

== Tactics ==
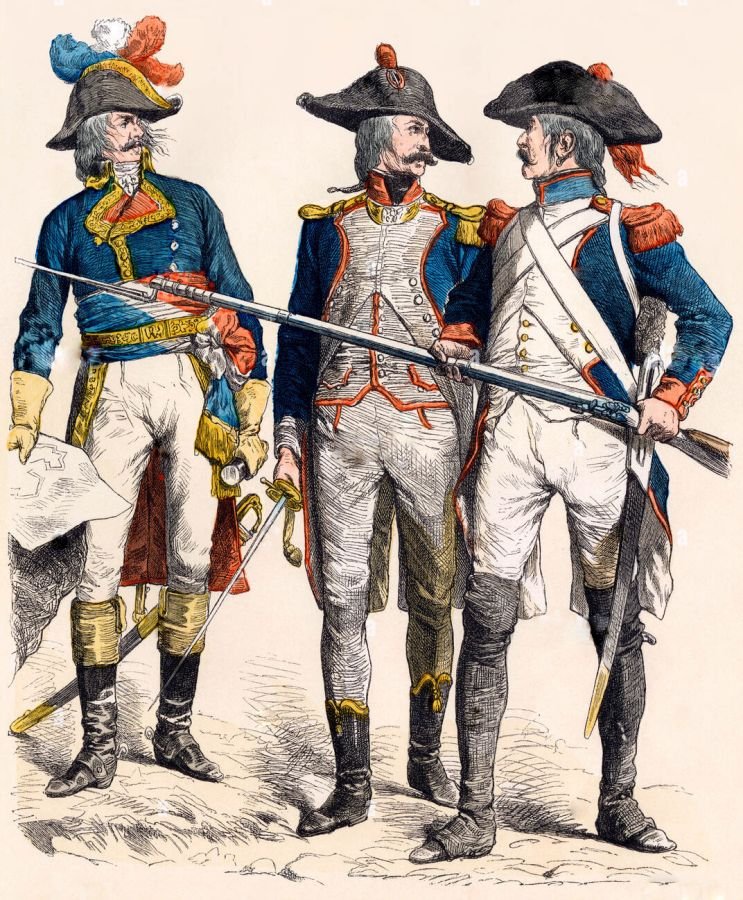
French general, light infantry officer and line infantryman in 1795

Seeing the failure of the 1791 Reglement, several early revolutionary commanders followed de Broglie's example and experimented with the pre-revolutionary ideas, gradually adapting them until they discovered a system that worked. The final standard used by the early Revolutionary Armies consisted of the following:

- Troops with exceptional morale or skill became skirmishers, and were deployed in a screen in front of the Army. Their main fighting tactics were of a guerrilla-warfare nature. Both mounted and on foot, the large swarm of skirmishers would hide from enemies if possible, pepper their formations with fire and deploy ambushes. Unable to retaliate on the scattered skirmishers, the morale and unit cohesion of the better trained and equipped émigré and monarchist armies was gradually worn down. The incessant harassing fire usually resulted in a section of the enemy line wavering, and then the 'regular' formations of the Revolutionary Army would be sent into the attack.
- Troops with less skill and of more dubious quality, making up the 'regular' part of the army, were formed into battalion columns. The battalion column required little training to perfect, and provided commanders with potent "battering ram-style" formations with which to hit the enemy lines after the skirmishers had done their work. The skirmish screen also provided protection for those troops.

== Infantry ==
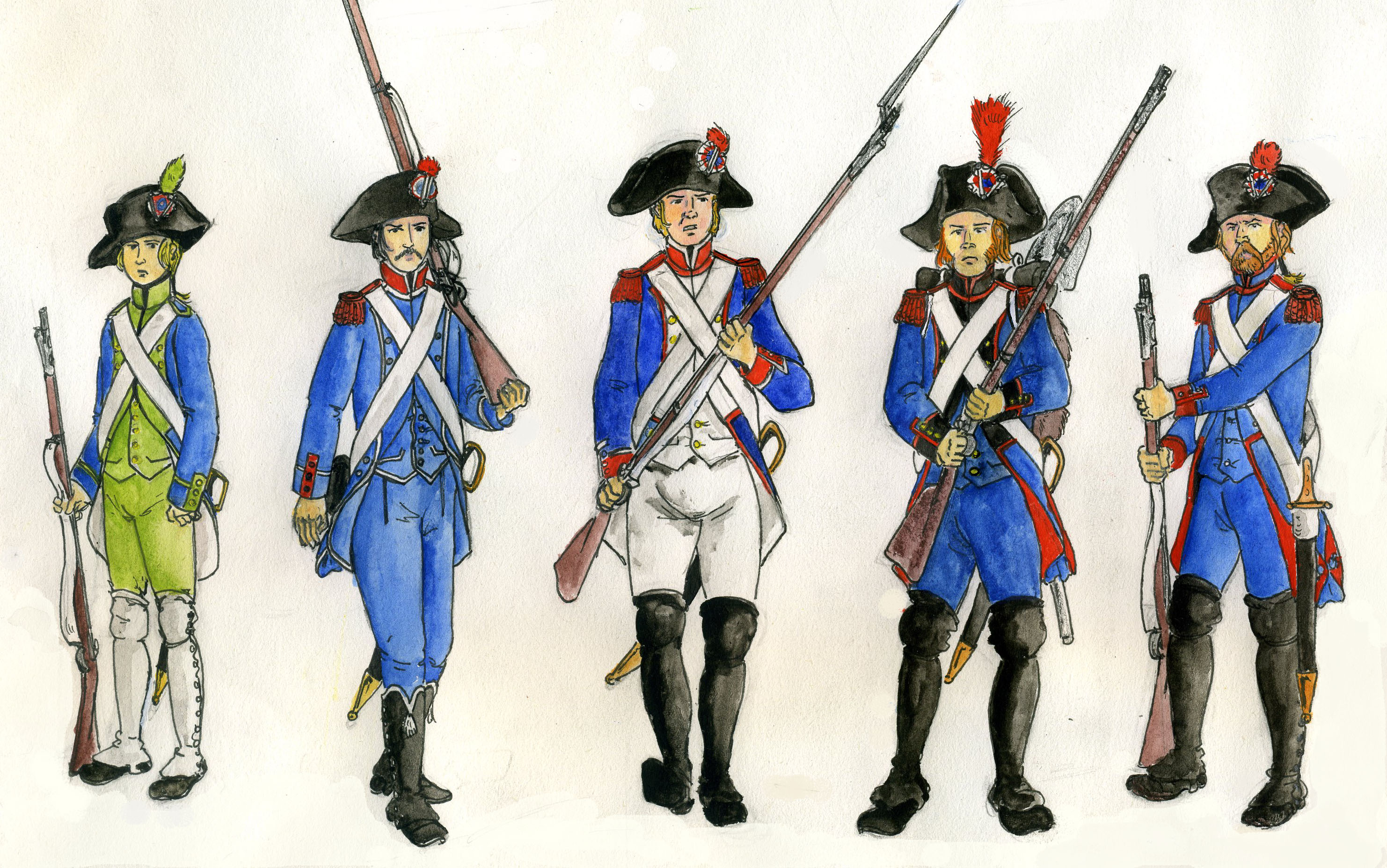
Five French soldiers (left to right): coast guard, carabinier, line infantryman, sapper and artilleryman

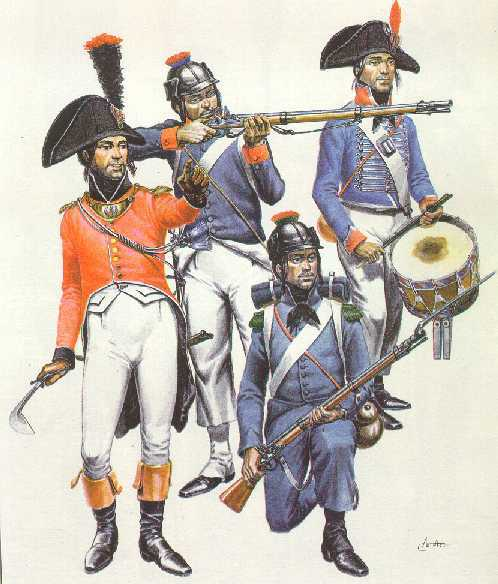
French troops in Egypt (left to right): line infantry officer, line infantryman, light infantryman and line infantry drummer

Following the dissolution of the Ancien régime, the system of named regiments was abandoned. Instead, the new army was formed into a series of numbered demi-brigades. Consisting of two or three battalions, these formations were designated demi-brigades in an attempt to avoid the feudal connotations of the term Regiment. In mid-1793, the Revolutionary Army officially comprised 196 infantry demi-brigades. After the initial dismal performance of the Fédéré volunteer battalions, Carnot ordered that each demi-brigade was to consist of one regular (ex-Royal Army) and two fédéré battalions. These new formations, intended to combine the discipline and training of the old army with the enthusiasm of the new volunteers, were proven successful at Valmy in September 1792. In 1794, the new demi-brigade was universally adopted.

The Revolutionary Army had been formed from a hodgepodge of different units, and as such did not have a uniform appearance. Veterans in their white uniforms and tarleton helmets from the ancien regime period served alongside national guardsmen in their blue jackets with white turnbacks piped red and fédérés dressed in civilian clothes with only the red phrygian cap and the tricolour cockade to identify them as soldiers. Poor supplies meant that uniforms which had worn out were replaced with civilian clothes, and so the Revolutionary Army lacked any semblance of uniformity, with the exception of the tricolour cockade which was worn by all soldiers. As the war progressed, several demi-brigades were issued specific coloured uniform jackets, and the Revolutionary Armée d'Orient which arrived in Egypt in 1798 was uniformed in purple, pink, green, red, orange and blue jackets.

Along with the problem of uniforms, many men of the Revolutionary Army lacked weapons and ammunition. Any weapons captured from the enemy were immediately absorbed into the ranks. After the Battle of Montenotte in 1796, 1,000 French soldiers who had been sent into battle unarmed were afterwards equipped with captured Austrian muskets. As a result, uniformity was also lacking in weapons. Besides the regular demi-brigades, light infantry demi-brigades also existed. These formations were formed from soldiers who had shown skill in marksmanship, and were used for skirmishing in front of the main force. As with the line demi-brigades, the light demi-brigades lacked uniformity in either weapons or equipment.

== Artillery ==
Supporting the skirmishers was the French artillery. The artillery had suffered least from the exodus of aristocratic officers during the early days of the Revolution, as it was commanded mostly by men drawn from the middle class. The man who would shape the era, Napoleon Bonaparte, himself was an artilleryman. The various technical improvements of Général Jean Baptiste Vaquette de Gribeauval in the years preceding the Revolution, and the subsequent efforts of Baron du Teil and his brother Chevalier Jean du Teil meant that the French artillery was the finest in Europe. The Revolutionary Artillery was responsible for several of the Republic's early victories; for example at Valmy, on 13 Vendémiaire, and at Lodi. The revolutionary cannon played a vital role in their success. The cannon continued to have a dominating role on the battlefield throughout the Napoleonic Wars.

== Cavalry ==
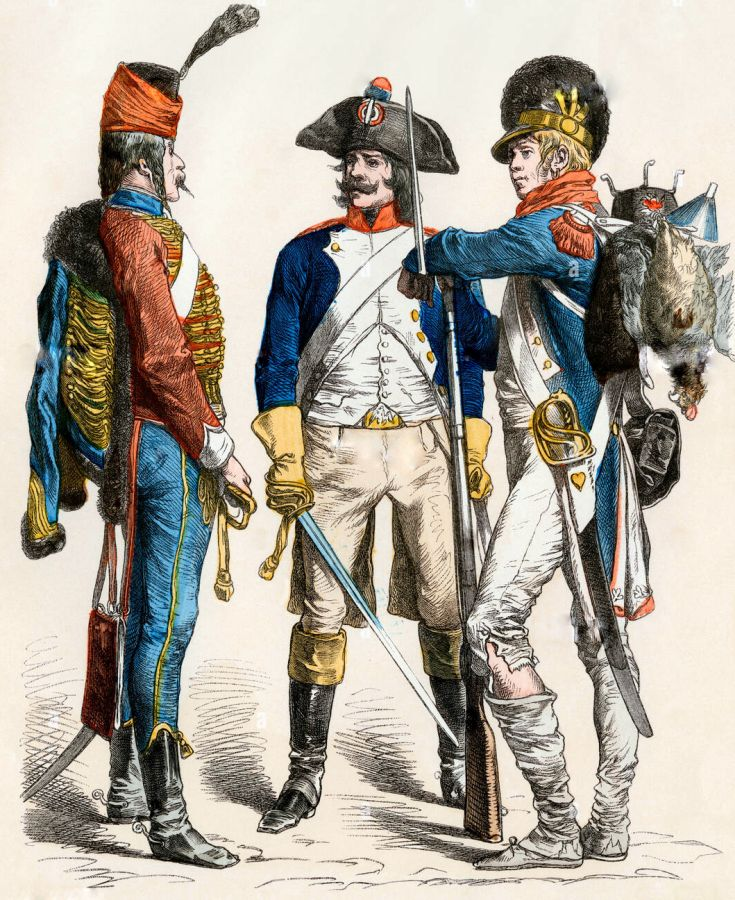
French hussar, line cavalryman and line infantryman in 1795

The cavalry was seriously affected by the Revolution. The majority of officers had been of aristocratic birth and had fled France during the final stages of the monarchy or to avoid the subsequent Terror. Many French cavalrymen joined the émigré army of the Prince du Condé. Two entire regiments, the Hussards du Saxe and the 15éme Cavalerie (Royal Allemande) defected to the Austrians.

Lacking not only trained officers, but also mounts and equipment, the Revolutionary Cavalry became the worst equipped arm of the Revolutionary Army. By mid-1793, the paper organisation of the Revolutionary Army included twenty six heavy cavalry regiments, two regiments of carabiniers, twenty dragoon regiments, eighteen regiments of chasseurs à cheval and ten hussar regiments. In reality, it was seldom that any of these regiments reached even half strength. However, unlike the infantry, where all battalions of the old Royal Army were merged with freshly raised volunteers to form new demi-brigades, the cavalry retained their regimental identities throughout the revolutionary and Napoleonic periods. As one example, the Regiment de Chasseurs d'Alsace (raised in 1651) was renamed the 1er Regiment de Chasseurs in 1791 but otherwise remained unchanged until it was finally disbanded after Waterloo.

== Aerostatic corps ==
The French Aerostatic Corps (compagnie d'aérostiers) was the first French air force, founded in 1794 to use balloons, primarily for reconnaissance. The first military use of the balloon occurred on 2 June 1794, when it was used for reconnaissance during an enemy bombardment. On 22 June, the corps received orders to move the balloon to the plain of Fleurus, in front of the Austrian troops at Charleroi.

== Notable generals and commanders ==
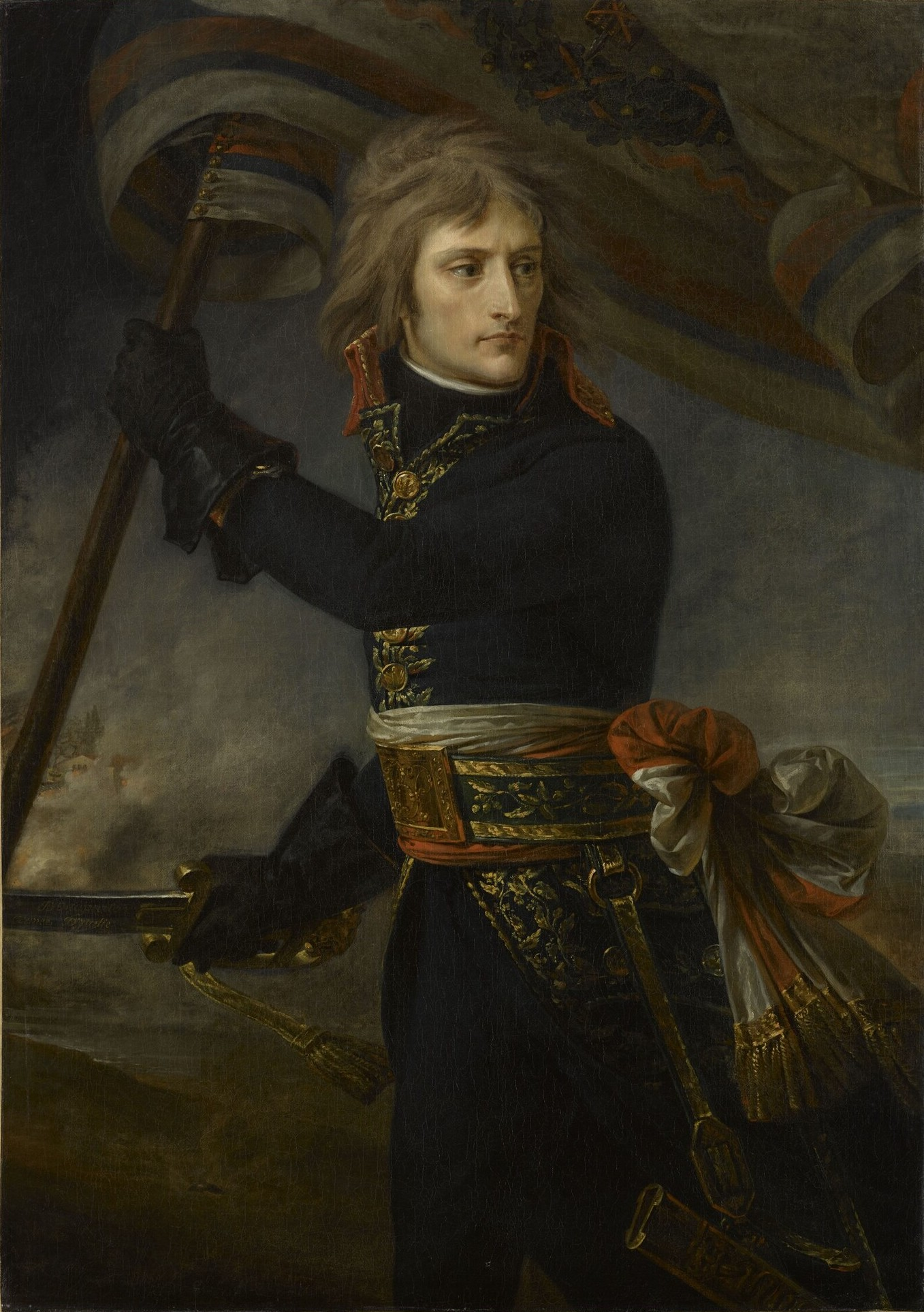
Napoleon

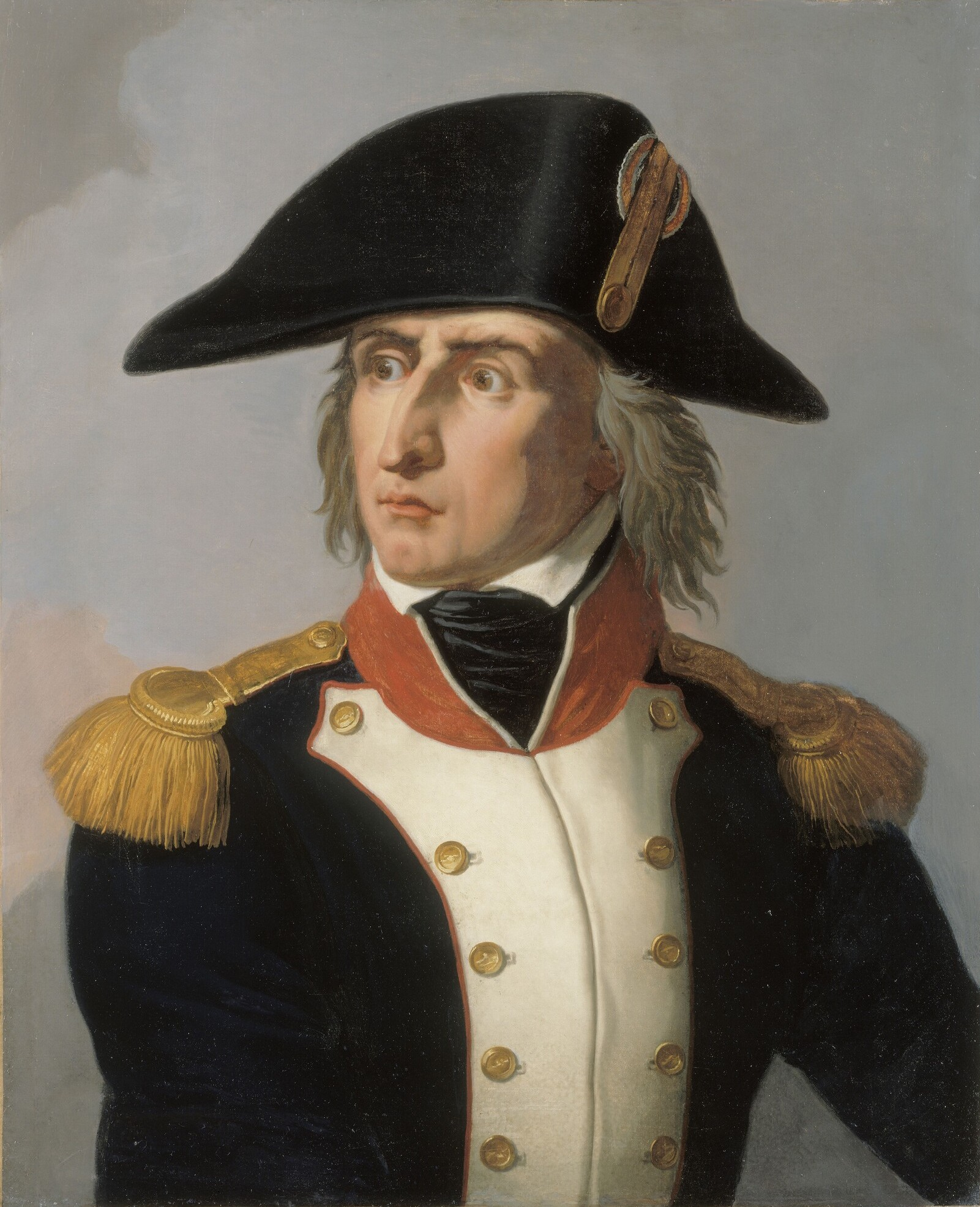
Pierre Augereau

Jean-Baptiste Bernadotte

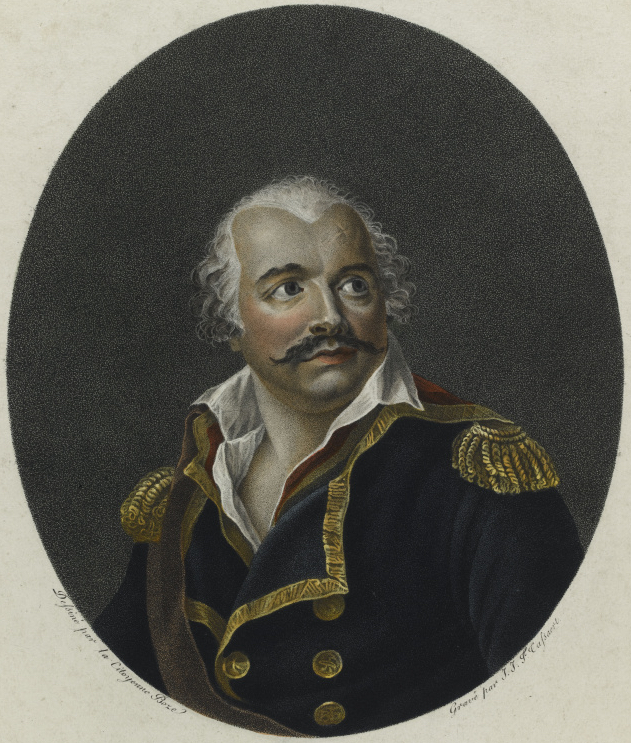
Jean François Carteaux

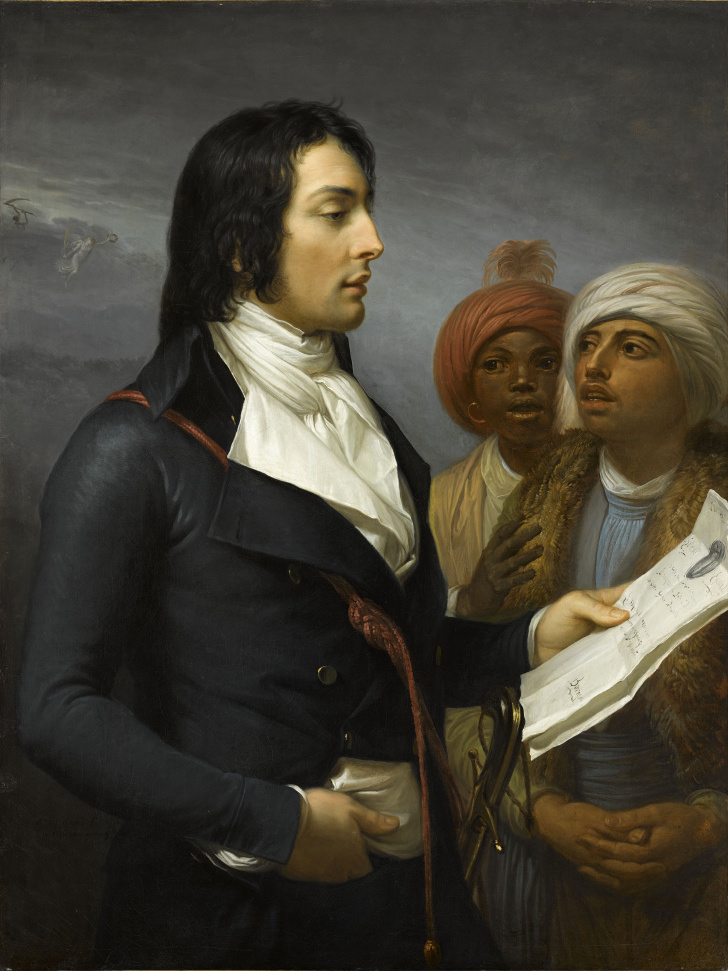
Louis Desaix

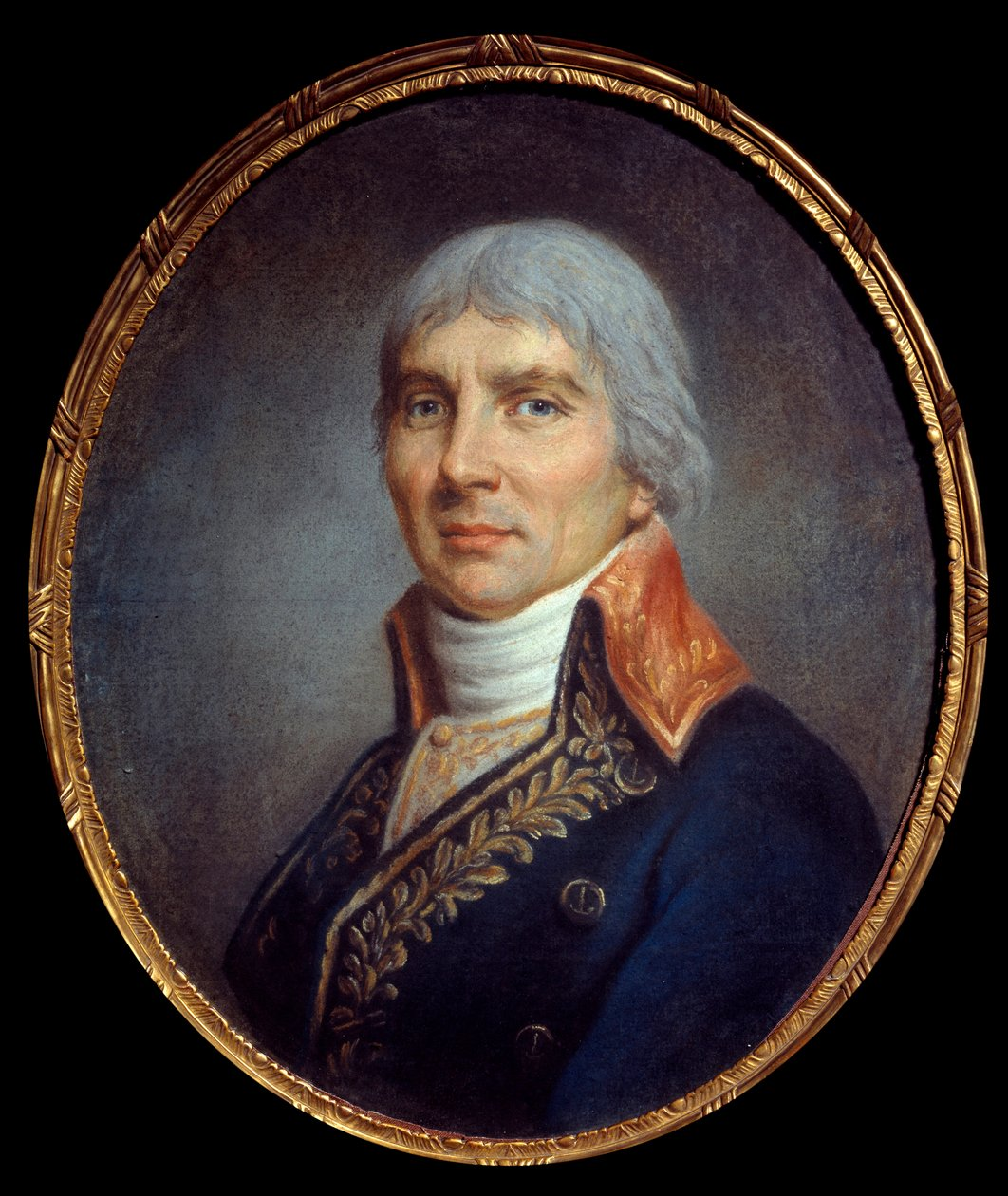
Jacques François Dugommier

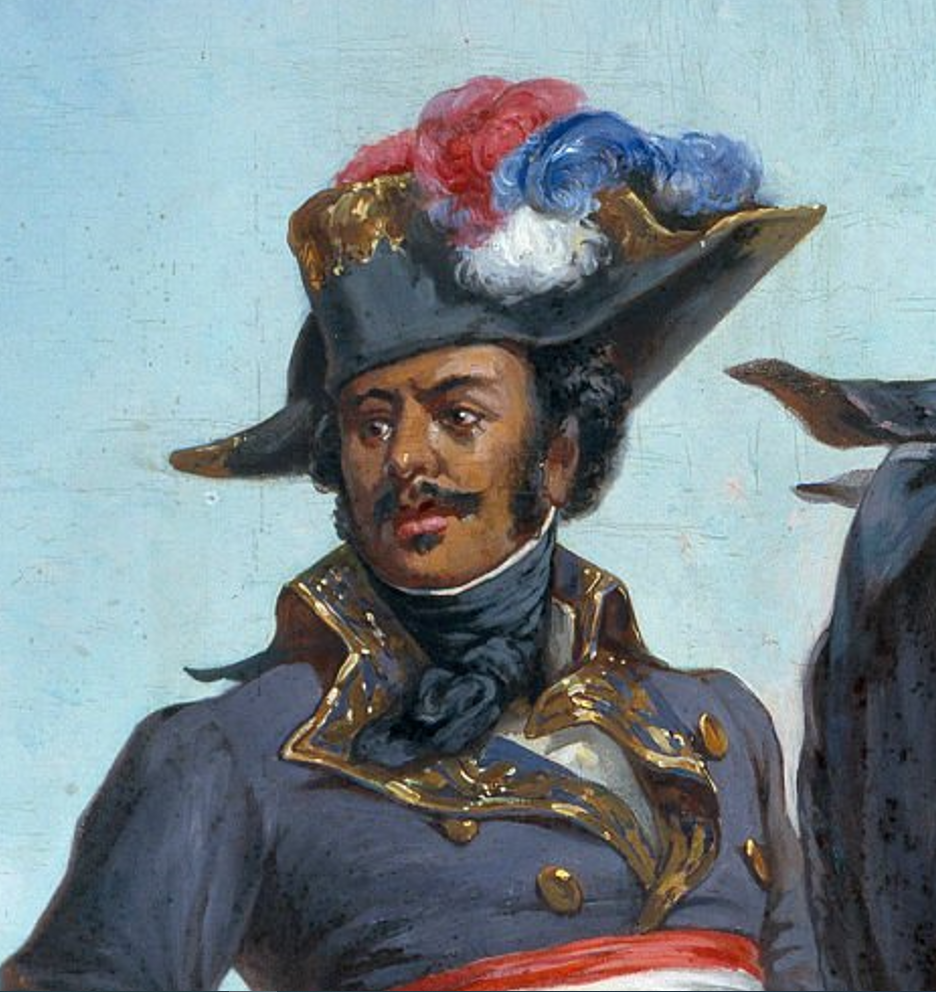
Thomas-Alexandre Dumas

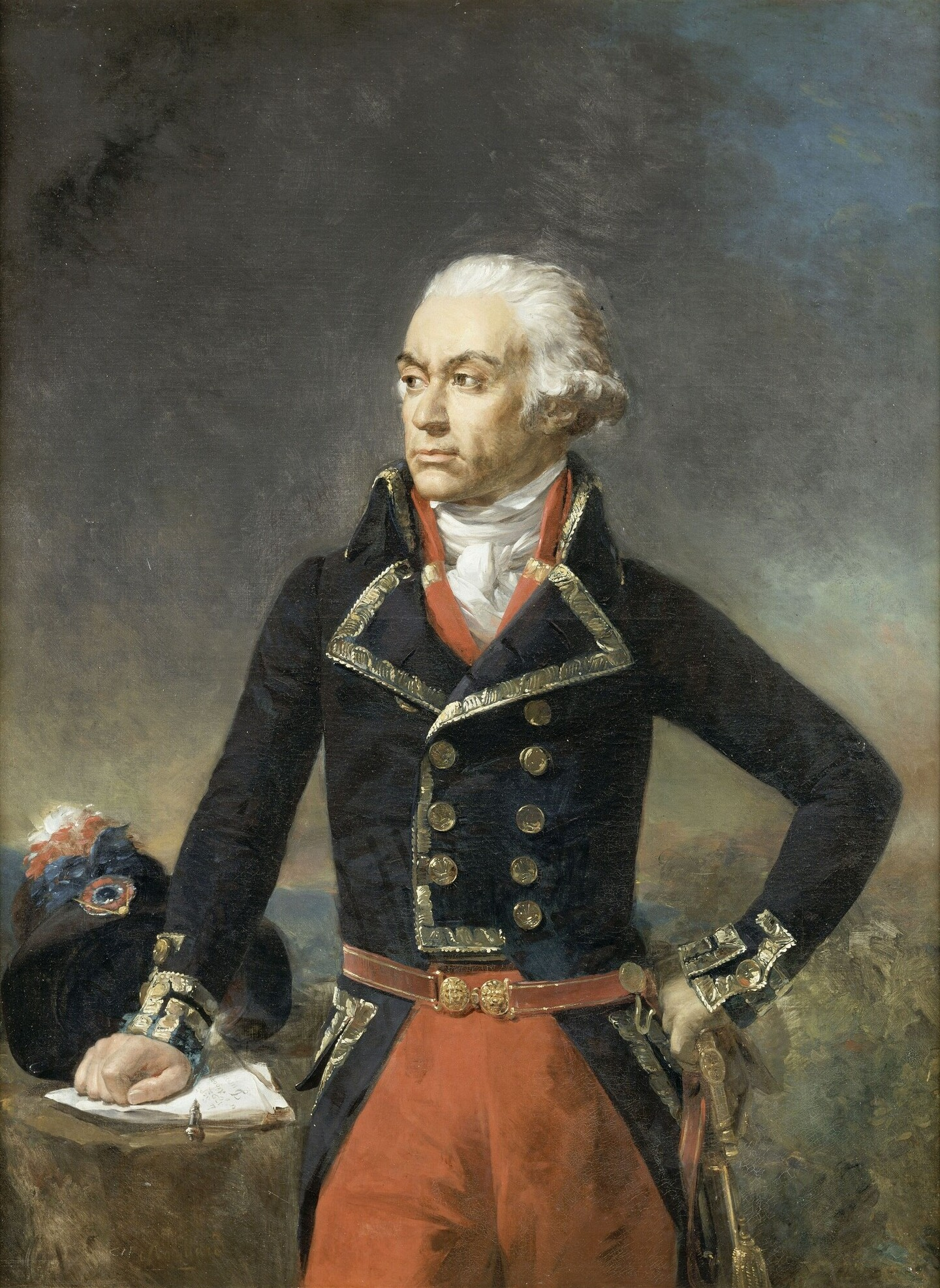
Charles François Dumouriez

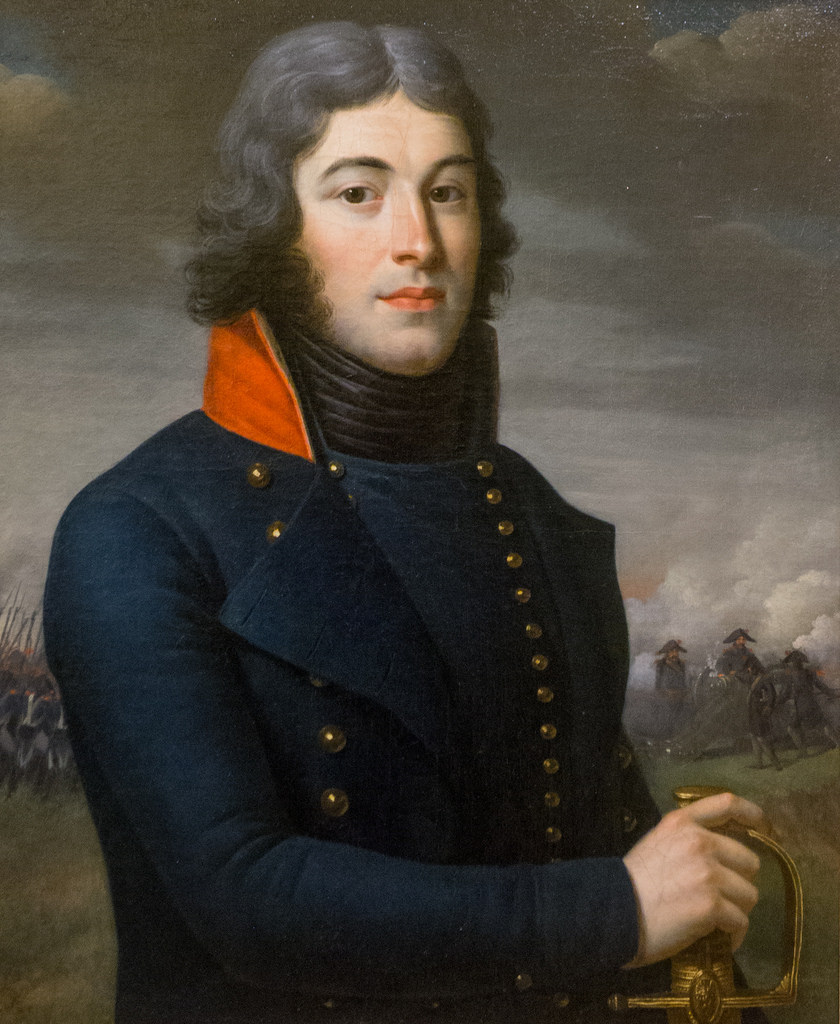
Lazare Hoche

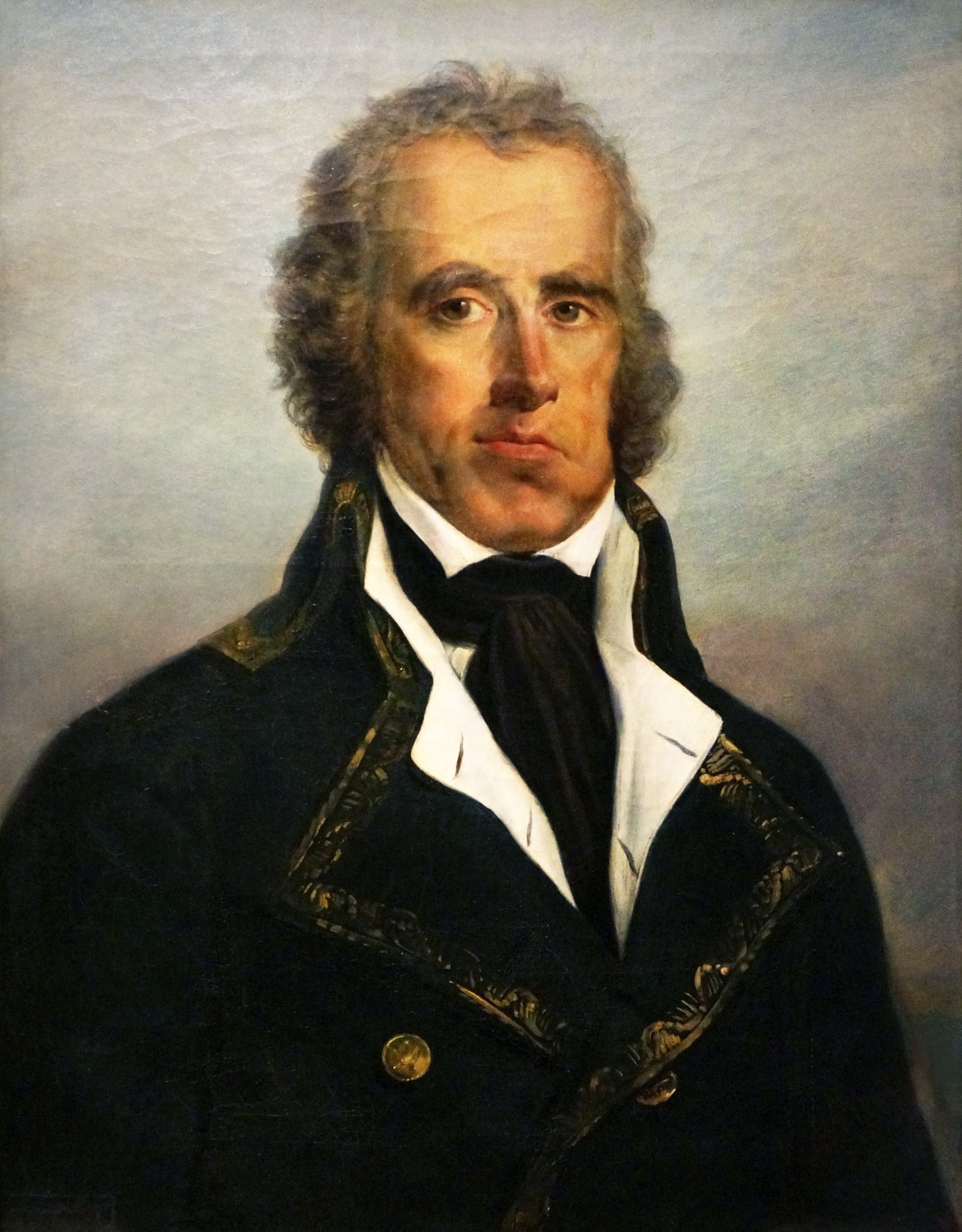
Jean Nicolas Houchard

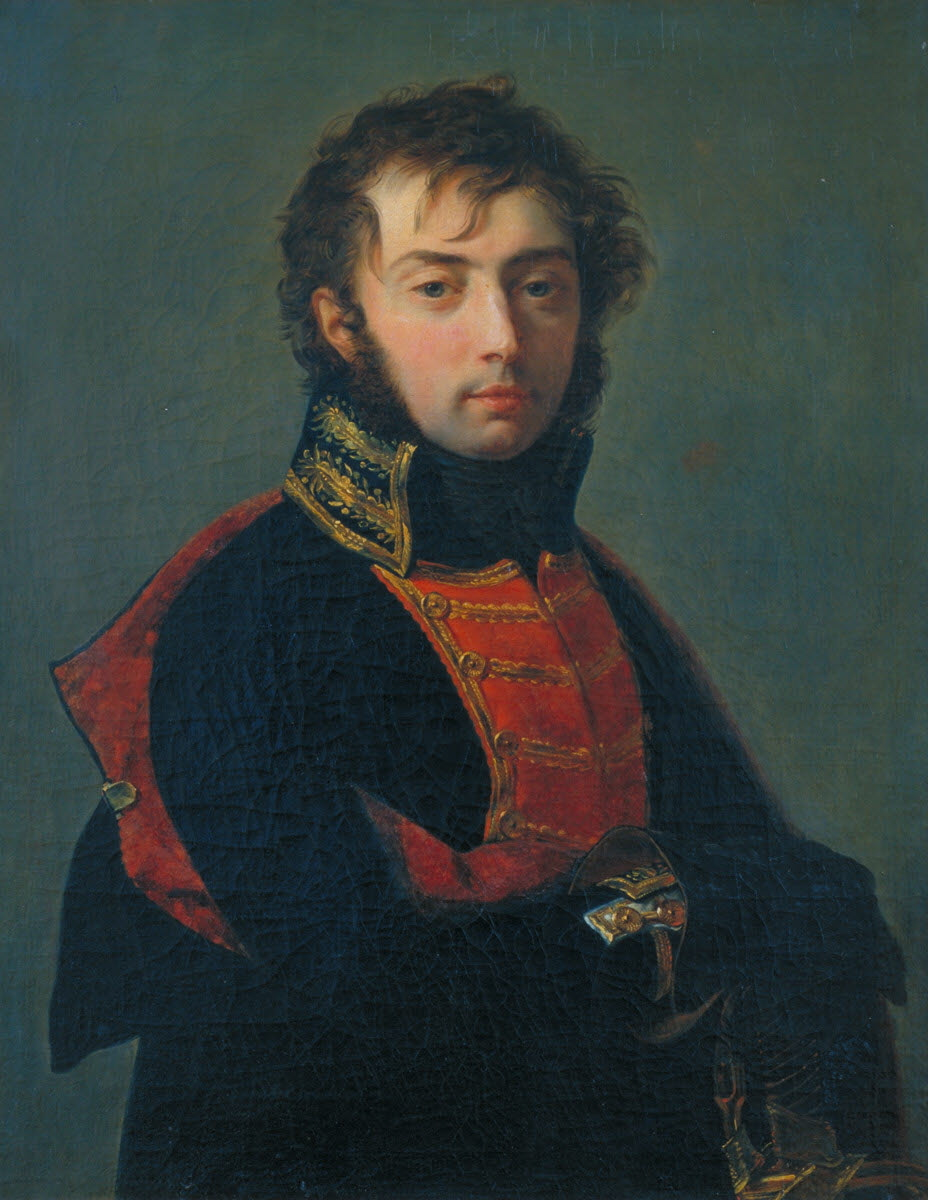
Barthélemy Joubert

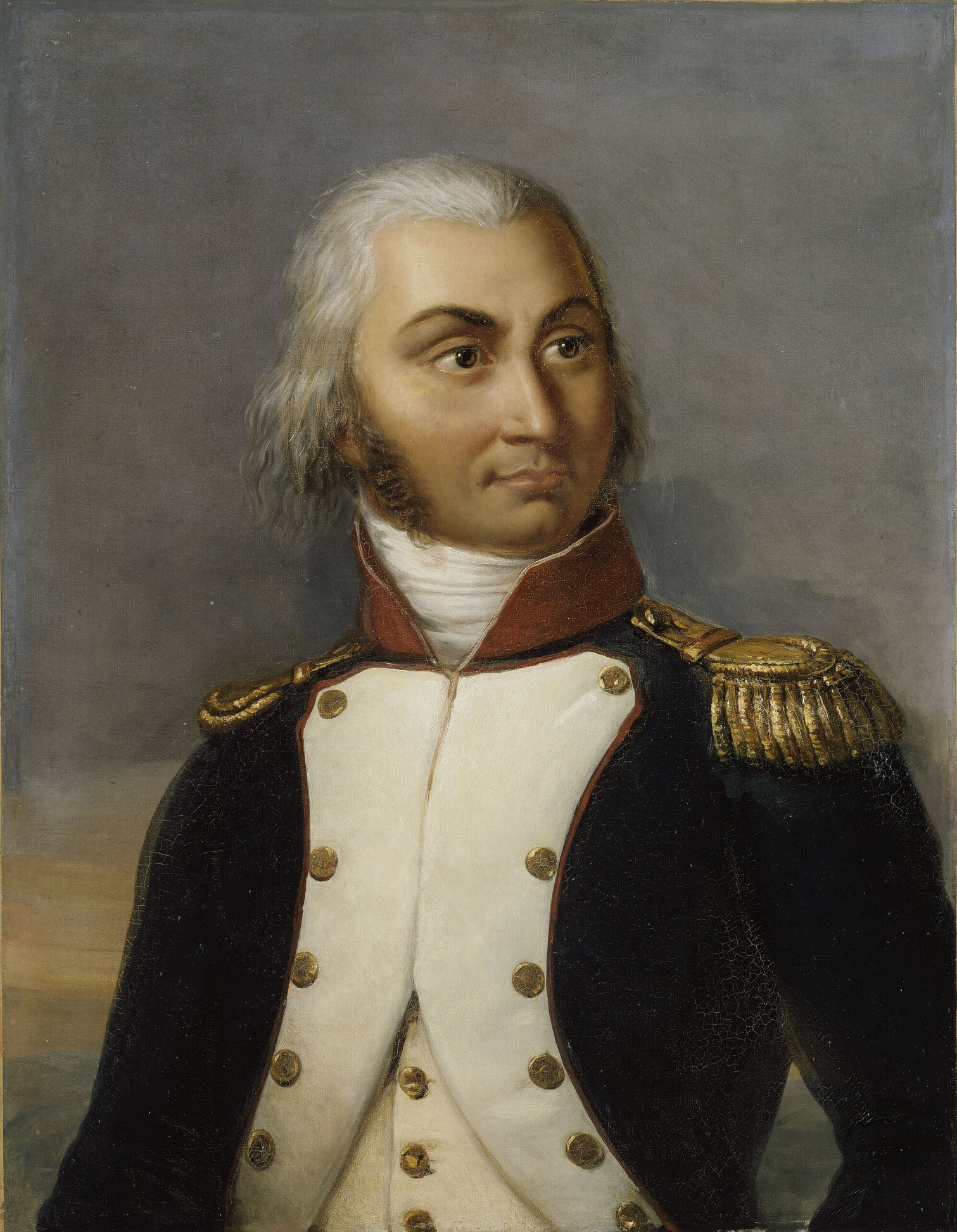
Jean-Baptiste Jourdan

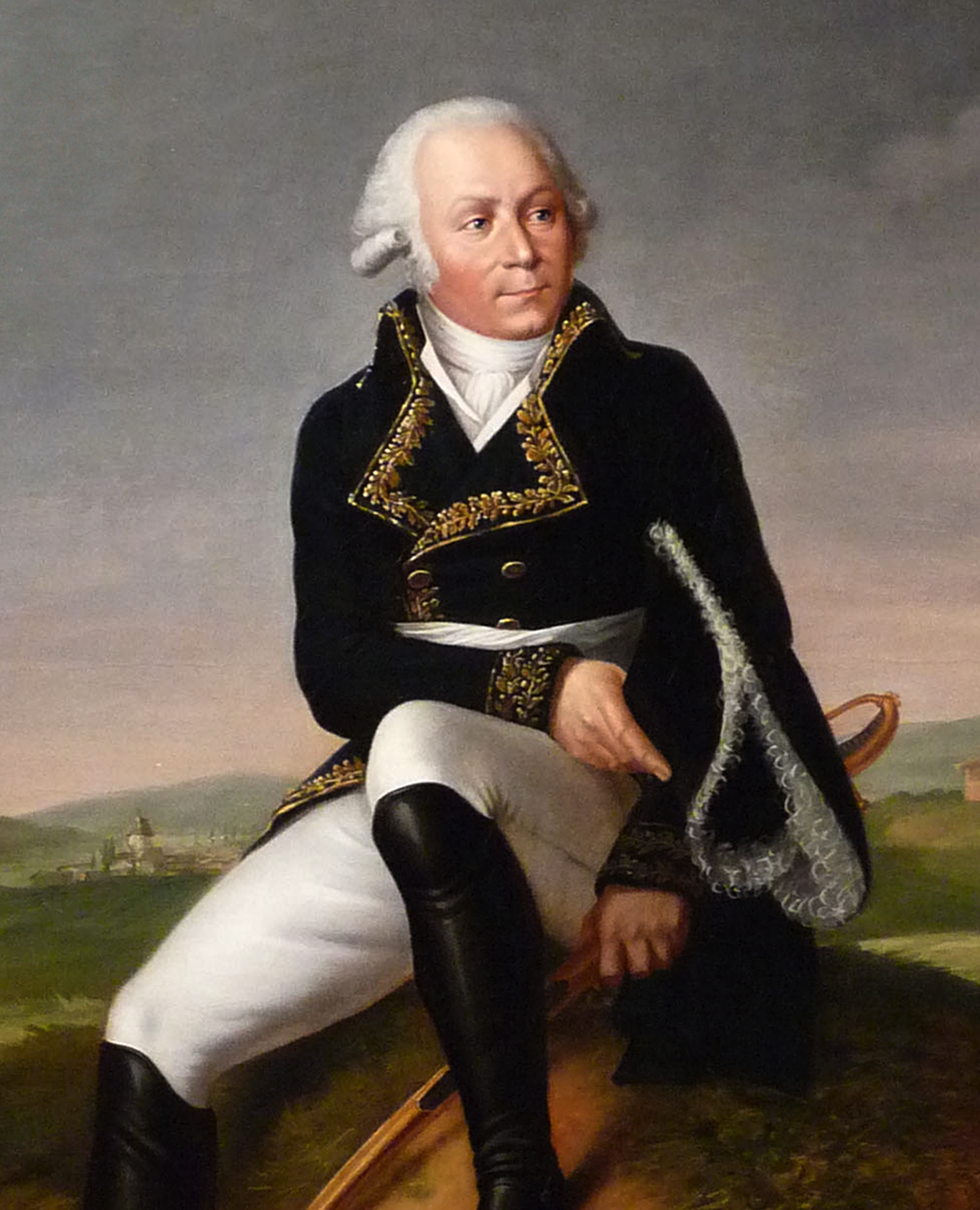
François Christophe Kellermann

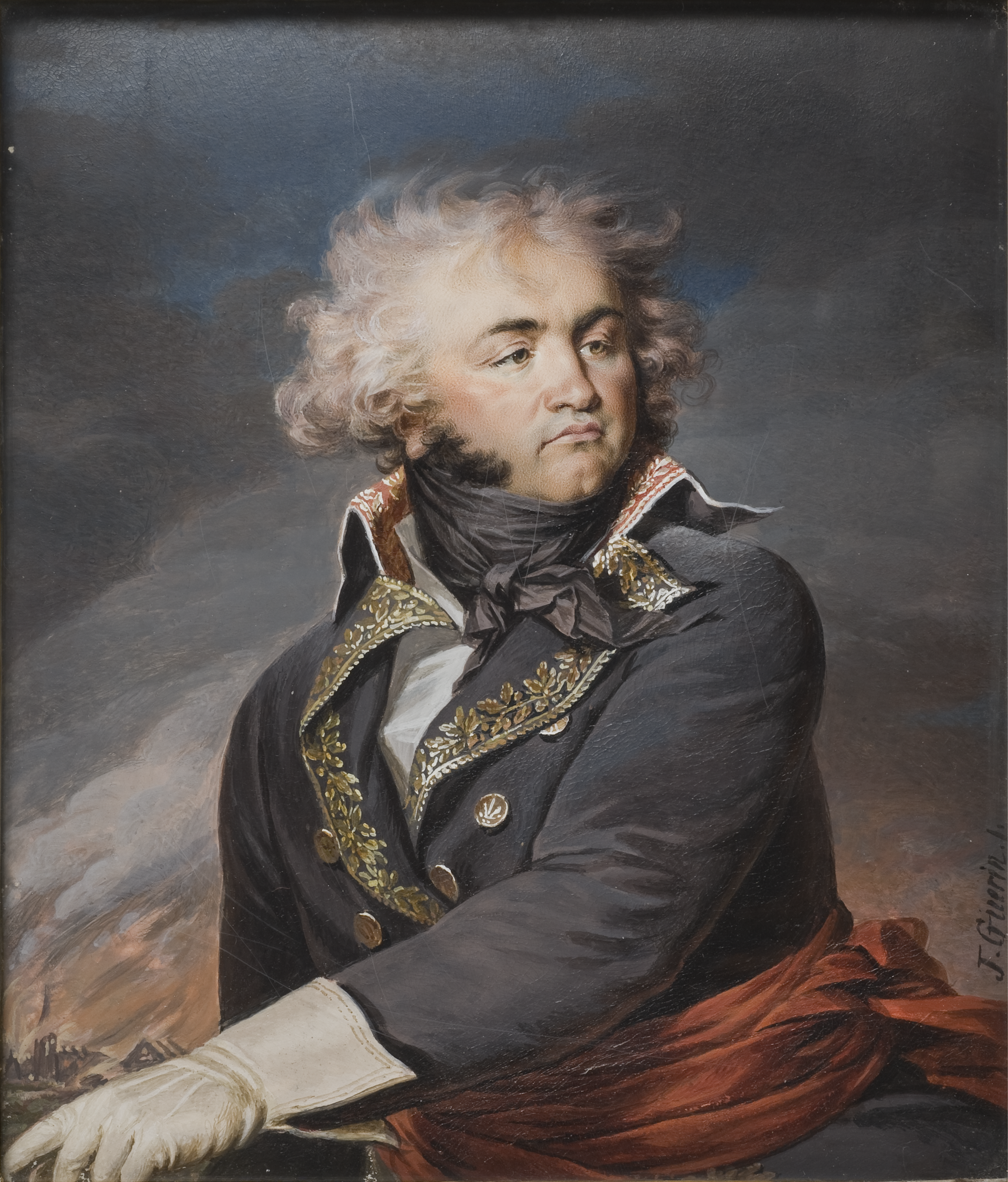
Jean-Baptiste Kléber

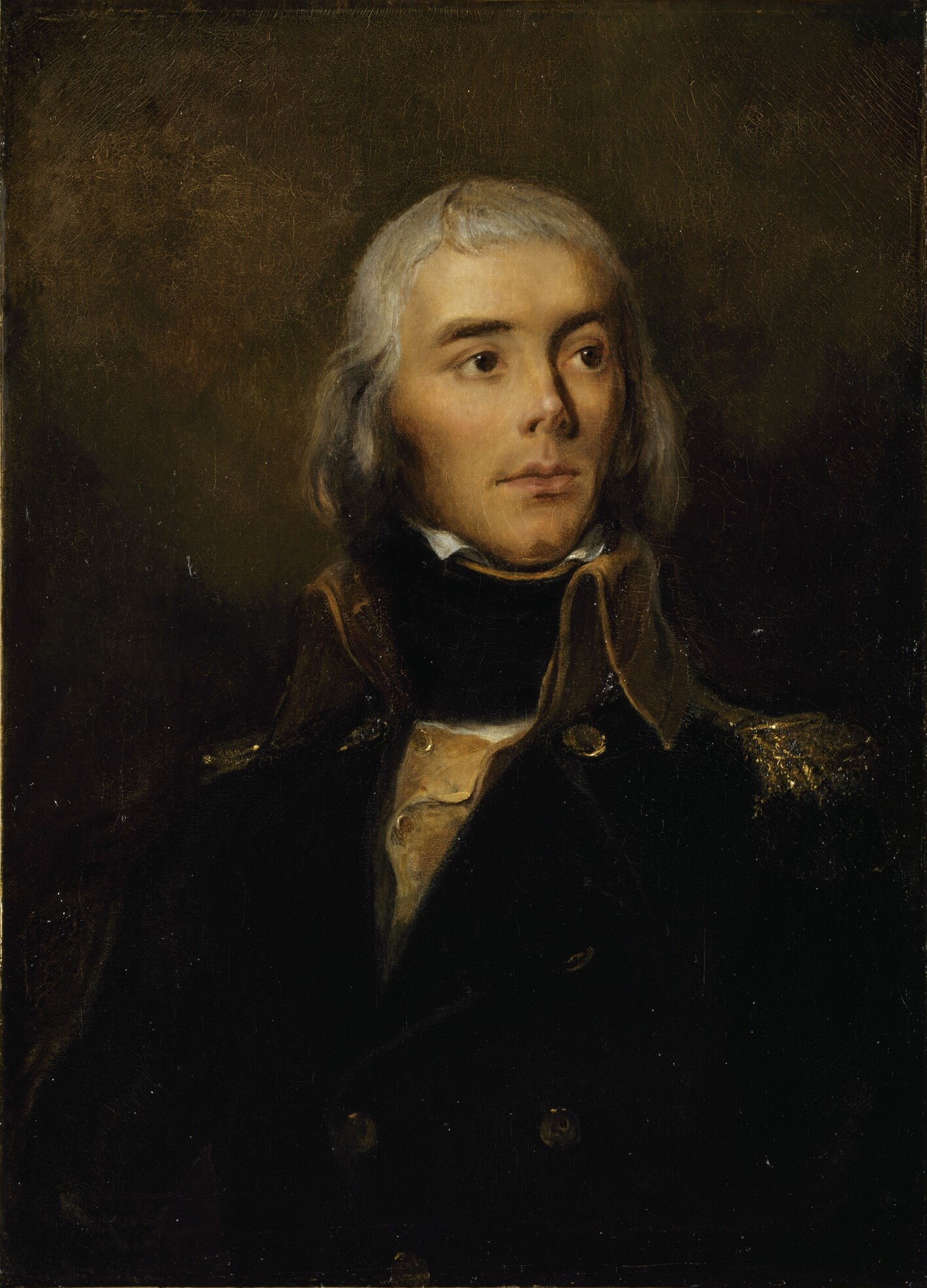
Étienne-Jacques MacDonald

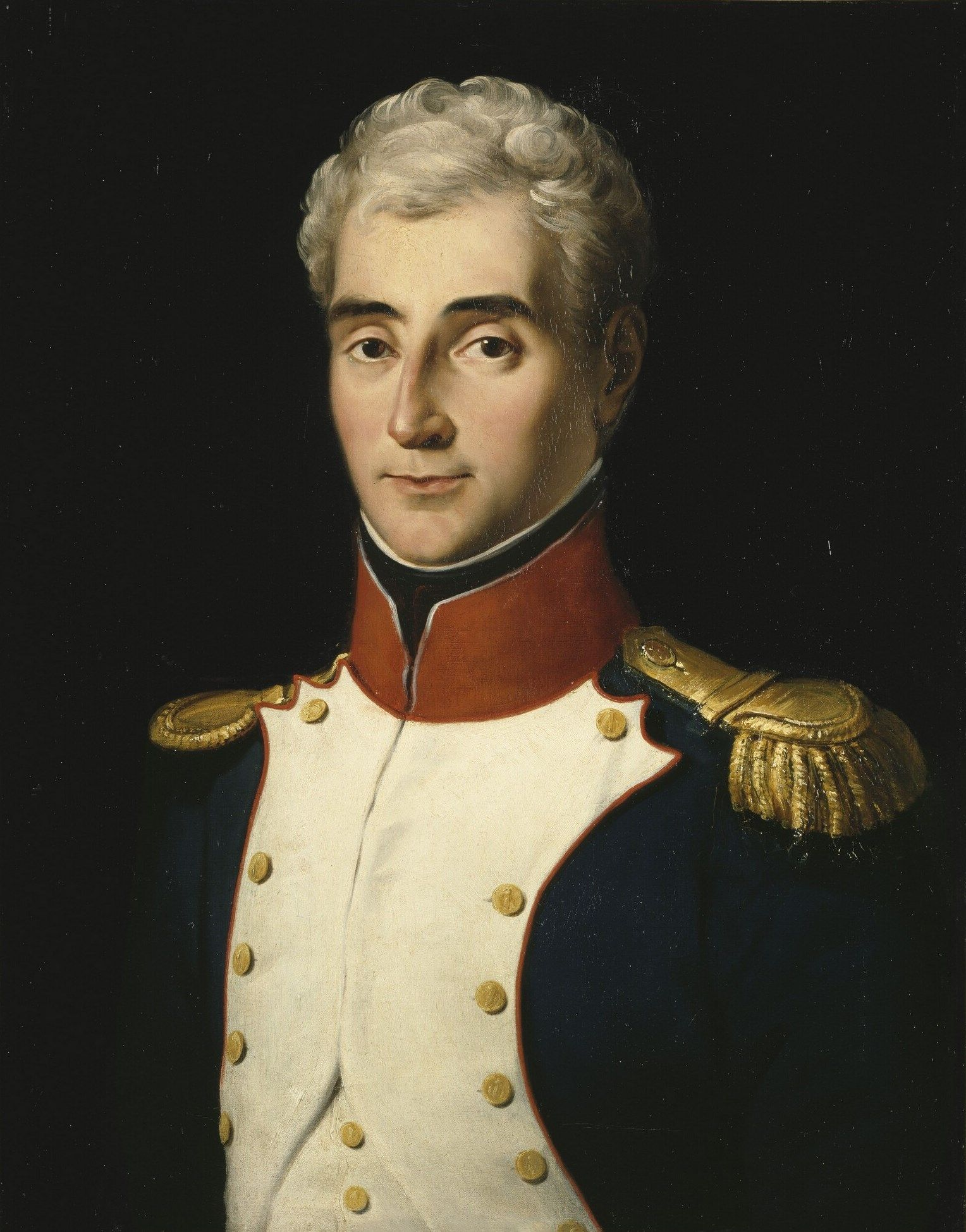
André Masséna

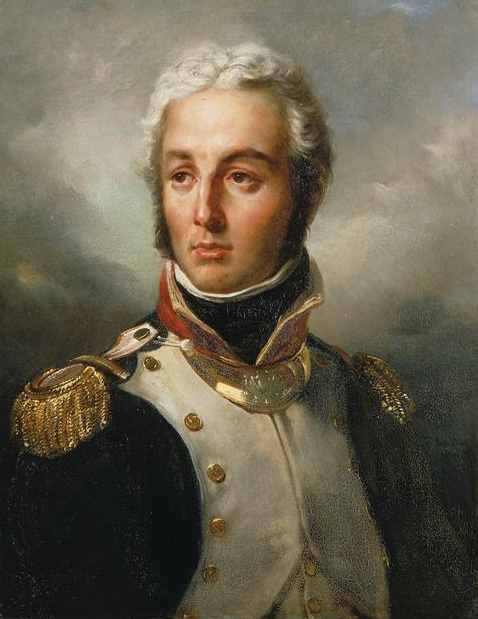
Jean Victor Marie Moreau

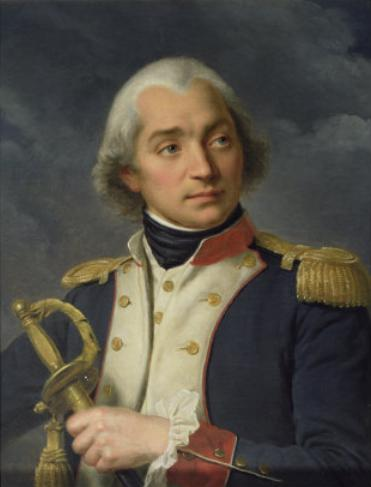
Charles Pichegru

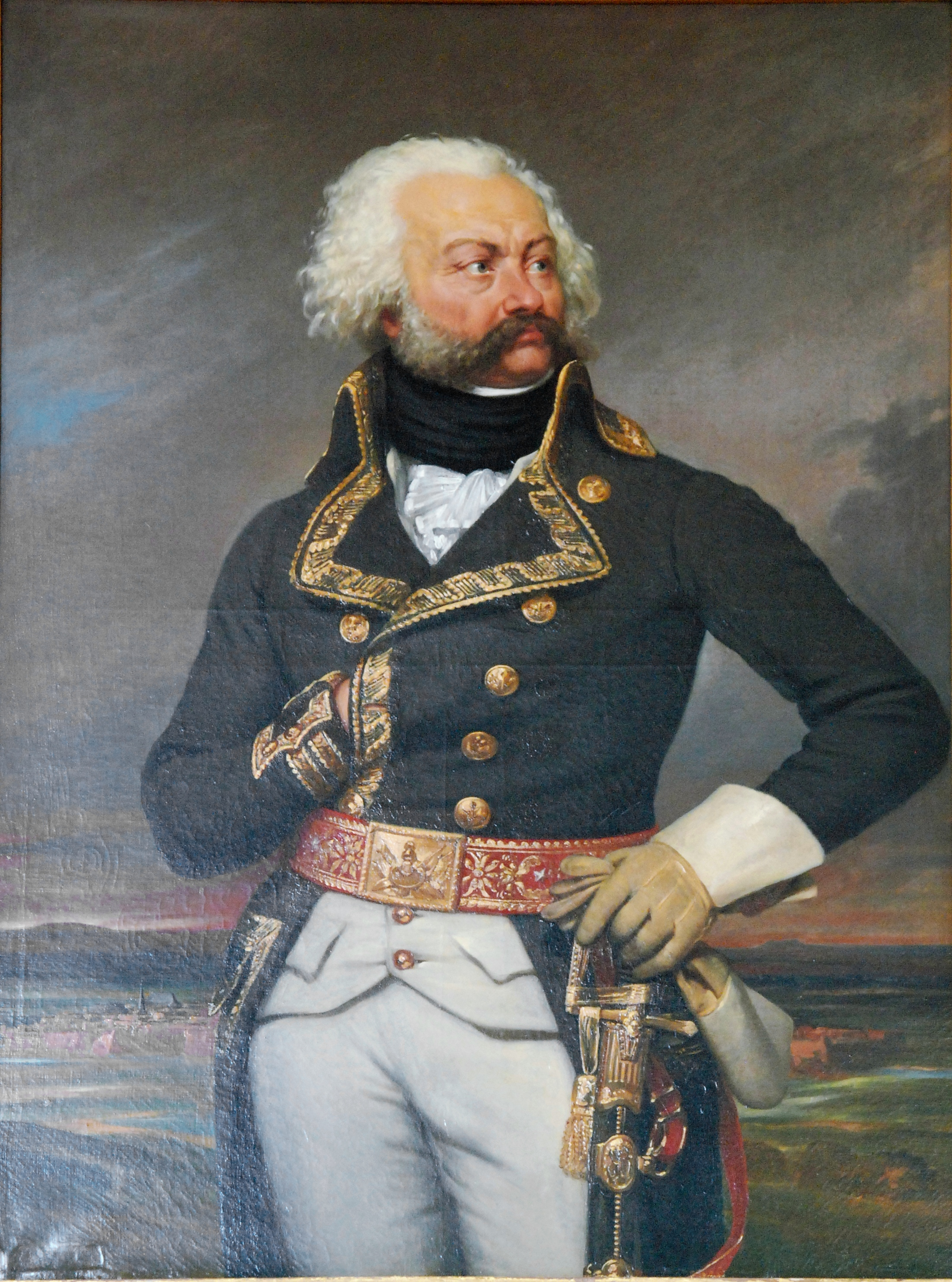
Adam Philippe, Comte de Custine

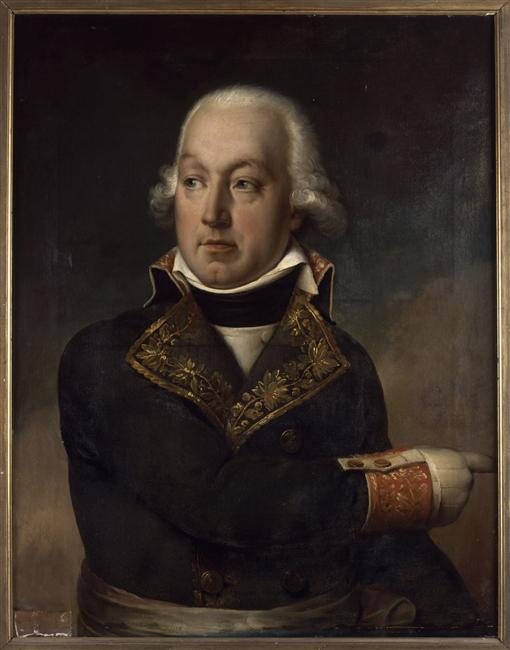
Barthélemy Schérer

== Field armies ==
In 1792, the French Revolutionary Army had eight field armies:

- Army of the North
- Army of the Rhine
- Army of the Alps
- Army of the Pyrenees
- Army of the Coasts
- Army of the Centre
- Army of Reserve
- Army of the Var

In 1793, the field armies of the French Revolutionary Army underwent a restructuring:

- Army of the North
- Army of the Ardennes
- Army of the Moselle
- Army of the Rhine
- Army of the Alps
- Army of Italy
- Army of the Coasts of Brest
- Army of the Coasts of Cherbourg
- Army of the Coasts of La Rochelle (redesignated as the Army of the West on 1 October 1793)
- Army of the Western Pyrenees
- Army of the Eastern Pyrenees

Several field armies were also formed for specific tasks:

- Army of Sambre and Meuse
- Army of the Rhine and Moselle
- Army of Rome (formed from the Army of Italy for the French occupation of Rome)
- Army of England (originally formed to invade Britain in 1797, but was redesignated as the Army of the West in 1800)
- Army of the Orient
- Army of Reserve (formed in secret by Napoleon and led by him personally during the Italian campaign of 1800, culminating in the Battle of Marengo)
- Army of Germany
- Army of the Danube
- Army of Helvetia
- Army of Holland
- Army of the Grisons
- Army of the Coasts of the Ocean (formed for Napoleon's planned invasion of the United Kingdom but became part of the Grande Armée in 1805)

== See also ==
- Émigré armies of the French Revolutionary Wars Royalist French forces in opposition to the revolutionary government of France.
- Social background of officers and other ranks in the French Army, 1750–1815
