= Jacques Antoine Hippolyte, Comte de Guibert =

French general and military writer (1743–1790)

Jacques Antoine Hippolyte Comte de Guibert
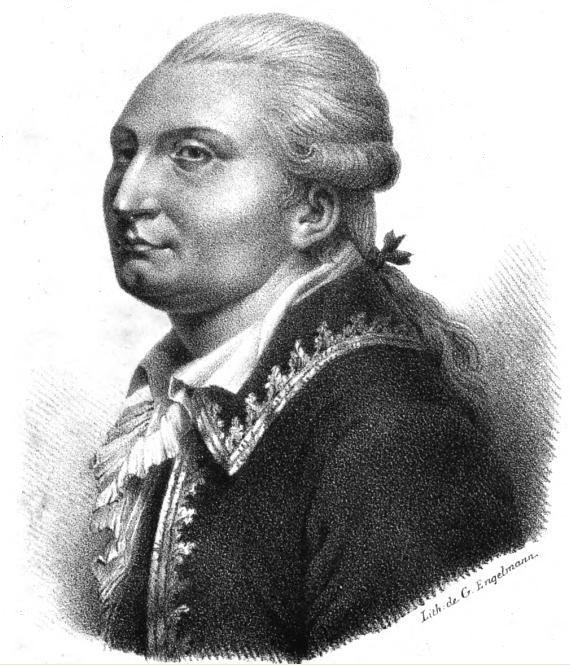
- Born: 12 November 1743; Montauban, France
- Died: 6 May 1790 (aged 46); Paris, France
- Writing career
- Language: French

Jacques-Antoine-Hippolyte, Comte de Guibert (12 November 1743 – 6 May 1790) was a French general and military writer. Born at Montauban, he accompanied his father in wars before he became a general himself. In 1770, at 29, he published an essay on tactics which was very influential in his time, as it revolutionsed military tactics. It placed immense emphasis on the speed of armies, a concept later immortalised by Napoleon.

== Biography ==
He was born at Montauban, and at the age of thirteen accompanied his father, Charles-Benoît, comte de Guibert (1715–1786), chief of staff to Maréchal de Broglie, throughout the Seven Years' War in Germany, and was awarded the cross of St Louis and then promoted to the rank of colonel in the expedition to Corsica (1767).

In 1773 he visited Germany and was present at the Prussian regimental drills and army manœuvres; Frederick the Great, recognizing Guibert's ability, showed great favour to the young comte and freely discussed military questions with him. Guibert's Journal d'un voyage en Allemagne was published, with a memoir, by Toulongeon (Paris, 1803). His Défense du système de guerre moderne, a reply to his many critics (Neuchâtel, 1779) is a reasoned and scientific defence of the Prussian method of tactics, which formed the basis of his work when in 1775 he began to co-operate with the count de Saint-Germain in a series of much-needed and successful reforms in the French army. During those years, he also won the love of Julie de Lespinasse, whose love letters to him, later published, are still read today.

In 1777, however, Saint-Germain fell into disgrace, and his fall involved that of Guibert who was promoted to the rank of maréchal de camp and relegated to a provincial staff appointment. In his semi-retirement he vigorously defended his old chief Saint-Germain against his detractors. On the eve of the Revolution he was recalled to the War Office, but in his turn he became the object of attack and he died, practically of disappointment, on 6 May 1790.

== Writings ==
In 1770 he published his Essai général de tactique in London, and this celebrated work appeared in numerous subsequent editions and in English, German and even Persian translations (extracts also in Liskenne and Sauvan, Bibl. historique et militaire, Paris, 1845). Of this work (for a detailed critique of which see Max Jahns, Gesch. d. Kriegswissenschaften, vol. iii. pp. 2058–2070 and references therein) it may be said that it was the best essay on war produced by a soldier during a period in which tactics were discussed even in the salon and military literature was more abundant than at any time up to 1871.

Apart from technical questions, in which Guibert's enlightened conservatism stands in marked contrast to the doctrinaire progressiveness of Mesnil-Durand, Folard and others, the book is chiefly valued for its broad outlook on the state of Europe, especially of military Europe in the period 1763–1792. One quotation may be given as being a most remarkable prophecy of the impending revolution in the art of war, a revolution which the "advanced" tacticians themselves scarcely foresaw. "The standing armies, while a burden on the people, are inadequate for the achievement of great and decisive results in war, and meanwhile the mass of the people, untrained in arms, degenerates. ... The hegemony over Europe will fall to that nation which ... becomes possessed of manly virtues and creates a national army"—a prediction fulfilled almost to the letter within twenty years of Guibert's death.

Other works of Guibert, besides those mentioned, are: Observations sur la constitution politique et militaire des armées de S. M. Prussienne (Amsterdam, 1778), Eloges of Marshal Catinat (1775), of Michel de l'Hôpital (1778), and of Frederick the Great (1787). Guibert was a member of the Académie française from 1786, and he also wrote a tragedy, Le Connétable de Bourbon (1775) and a journal of travels in France and Switzerland. His final work was De la force publique considérée par tous ses rapports (Paris: Didot l'aîné, 1790) in which he contradicted several of the postulates on militias and professional armies. Guibert's writing on the subject - pondering the advantages and disadvantages of militias/conscript armies and mercenaries/professional forces until this day cover most fundamental arguments on the subject.

Guibert distinguished between "tactics" and "grand tactics" (which scholars today would refer to as grand strategy) in General Essay on Tactics.

== Notes ==
Attribution

== Bibliography ==
=== Guibert's works ===
- Guibert: Guibert's General Essay on Tactics, trans. Jonathan Abel (Leiden: Brill, 2021)
- Anon. (Guibert): Essai général de la Tactique (London: chez les libraires associés, 1772)
- translated by Lieutenant Douglas: A General Essay on Tactics (Whitehall: J.Millar, 1781)
- For translations of excerpts of both the Essai général de la Tactique and De la force publique into modern English, see Beatrice Heuser, The Strategy Makers: Thoughts on War and Society from Machiavelli to Clausewitz (Santa Monica, CA: Greenwood/Praeger, 2010), ISBN 978-0-275-99826-4, pp. 147–170.

=== Secondary Literature ===
- Jonathan Abel, Jacques-Antoine-Hippolyte, comte de Guibert: Father of Napoleon's Grande Armée (Norman: University of Oklahoma Press, 2016)
- Ethel Groffier, Le stratège des Lumières : Le comte de Guibert (1743-1790), Honoré Champion Éditeur, Paris (2005), 432 pages (ISBN 2745311166)
- Lucien Poirier, Les voix de la Stratégie (Paris: Fayard, 1985)
- See Toulongeon, Eloge véridique de Guibert (Paris, 1790); Madame de Stäel, Eloge de Guibert; Bardin, Notice historique du général Guibert (Paris. I836); Flavian d'Aldeguier, Discours sur la vie et les écrits du comte de Guibert (Toulouse, 1855); Count Forestie, Biographie du comte de Guibert (Montauban, 1855); Count zur Lippe, "Friedrich der Grosse und Oberst Guibert" Militaer-Wochenblatt 9 and 10 (1873).
- Beatrice Heuser: "Guibert (1744-1790): Prophet of Total War?", in Stig Förster & Roger Chickering (eds.): War in an Age of Revolution: The Wars of American Independence and French Revolution, 1775-1815 (Cambridge University Press, 2010), pp. 49–67.
