= Chevalier de Folard =

Jean Charles, Chevalier de Folard
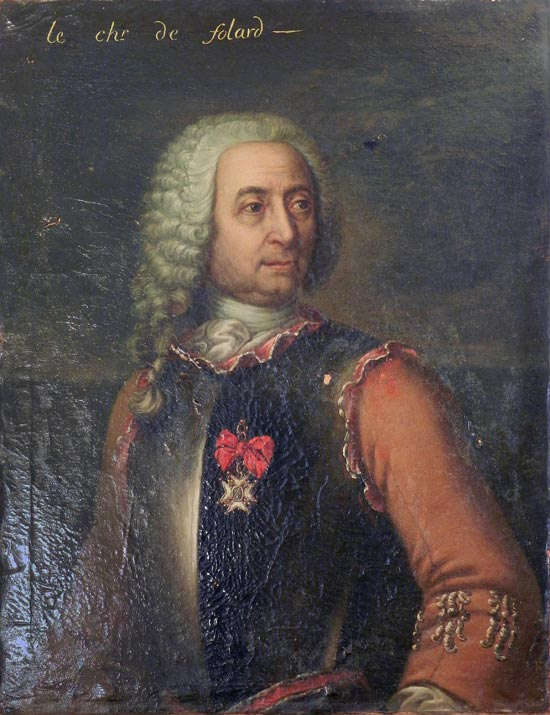
- Chevalier de Folard in old age; 18th century
- Born: 13 February 1669; Avignon, Papal States
- Died: 23 March 1752 (aged 83); Avignon, Papal State
- Military career
- Allegiance: France
- Service years: 1687–1719
- Rank: Colonel
- Conflicts: Nine Years War; War of the Spanish Succession; Cassano (WIA); Siege of Modena; Malplaquet (WIA); Great Northern War; War of the Quadruple Alliance; Siege of San Sebastián (1719)
- Awards: Order of Saint Louis

The Chevalier de Folard (13 February 1669 – 23 March 1752) was a professional soldier from Avignon which at the time was part of the Papal State. A military theorist, he championed the use of infantry columns, rather than the prevailing preference for linear formations. Although his ideas were generally dismissed by contemporaries and he died in obscurity, they remained influential in the long-running debate on tactics that followed.

== Personal details ==
Jean Charles de Folard was born 13 February 1669 to Jérôme de Folard (1631–1706), a Professor of Law, and Madeleine de Ruffi (died 1688). Originally from England, the Folard family settled in Savoy during the 13th century, before moving to Avignon at the end of the 16th.

One of seven surviving children, Foulard was the second of four brothers. The eldest, Nicolas-Joseph (1664–1734), was a canon at Nîmes Cathedral and noted scholar. Melchior (1684–1739), the youngest brother, also became a priest and wrote a number of plays that are now largely forgotten.

Little is known of the third brother Paul (1683–after 1745), who had a long and undistinguished military career, retiring in 1745 as a captain after forty years of service. Hubert de Folard (1709–1803), a prominent French diplomat of the later 18th century who helped edit Folard's books, is sometimes incorrectly described as his nephew. In fact, he was the son of his cousin Joseph François (1681–1748).

== Career ==
Like his brothers, Folard was educated by the Jesuits but ran away to join the French Royal Army at the age of 16, an action allegedly inspired by reading Caesar's "Commentaries". Forced to return home after his father wrote to his commanding officer, in 1687 he was allowed to join the Régiment de Béarn as an Officer cadet. Promoted Second lieutenant on the outbreak of the Nine Years War in 1688, his unit spent most of the war on garrison duty and when peace came in 1697, Folard was an obscure lieutenant.

=== War of the Spanish Succession ===
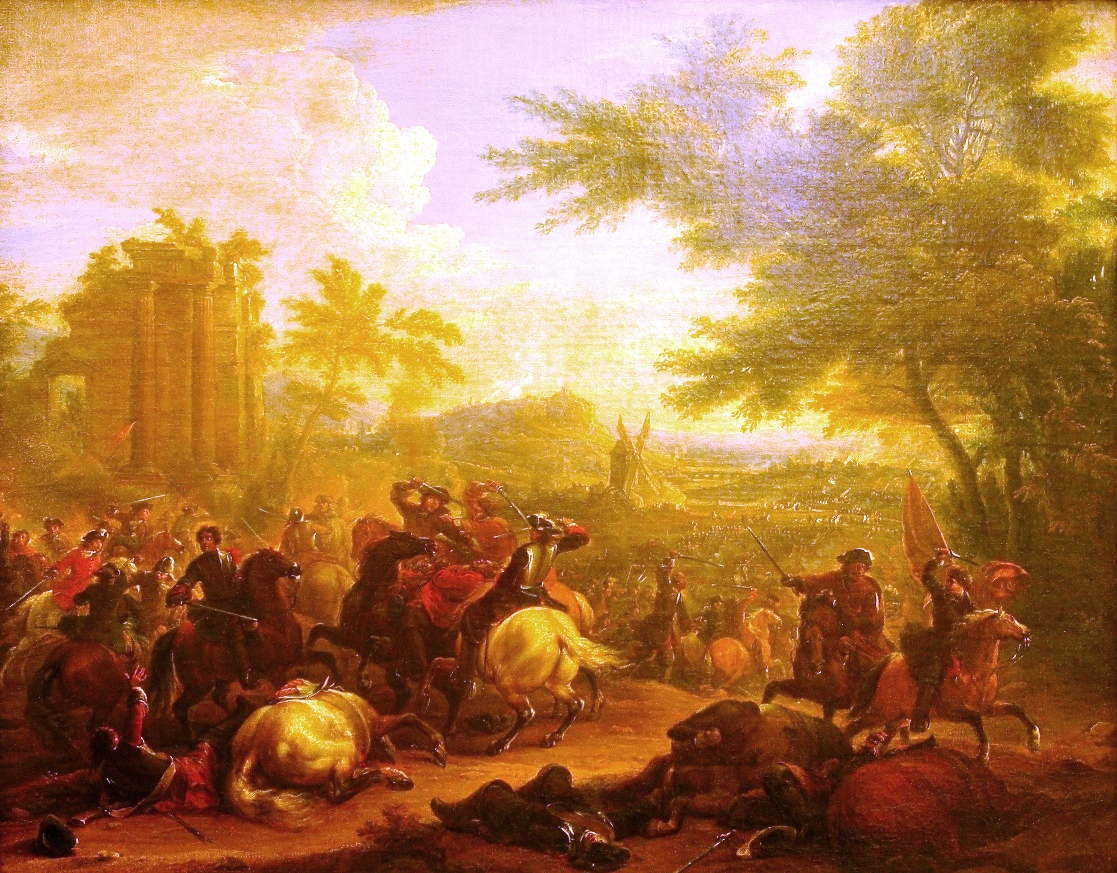
Cassano 1705; badly wounded in the battle, his experience there shaped many of Folard's ideas on offensive tactics

The War of the Spanish Succession began in July 1701, and in early 1702 Folard's regiment was sent to secure Naples, where he spent most of the next three years. He used the time to produce a series of tactical ideas and suggestions that brought him to the attention of the duc de Vendôme, commander of the French forces in Italy. Despite this, promotion remained slow, allegedly because Folard was unpopular with his superiors.

In October 1703, Savoy joined the anti-French Grand Alliance. During 1704, Folard served in Lombardy under Vendôme's less talented brother, Philippe de Vendôme, also known as the "Grand Prior". The campaign largely consisted of siege and positional warfare, which allowed Folard to display his engineering skills, and by the end of 1704 he was acting as technical advisor to the Grand Prior. Wounded at Cassano in August 1705, he was awarded the Cross of St. Louis in recognition of his service. While recuperating, Folard began developing the ideas on columns that formed the basis of his intellectual effort from then on.

He recovered in time for the 1706 campaign, and was appointed deputy to the commander of the French garrison in Modena. Defeat at Ramillies in July forced Louis XIV to withdraw many of his forces from Italy, while the breaking of the Siege of Turin left Modena isolated and it surrendered in February 1707 after a siege of four months. In March 1707, the Convention of Milan provided the remaining French troops in Italy free passage to France, rather than being held as prisoners of war.

Folard was among those who were transferred to Flanders, where he served under Vendôme during the 1708 campaign, although he did not participate in any major action. Badly wounded once again at Malplaquet in 1709 and with the war largely at a stalemate from 1710, Folard continued to bombard his superiors with ideas and suggestions. In 1711, he was made military Governor of Bourbourg, but lost this position following the 1713 Peace of Utrecht.

=== Later career ===
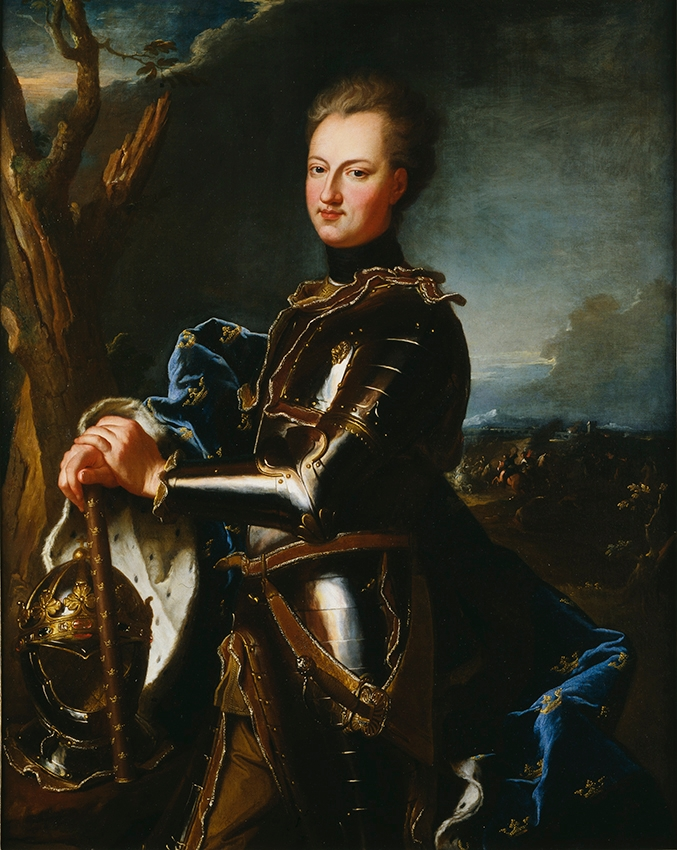
Charles XII of Sweden, whom Folard viewed as the most talented general of the period

In 1714, he joined a group of French officers and engineers sent to support the Knights Hospitallers, who feared their base in Malta was threatened by the Ottoman–Venetian War. Instead, the Ottomans attacked Venetian possessions in Greece and after falling out with his colleagues, Folard returned to France in 1715.

Sponsored by Georg Heinrich von Görtz, in 1716 he entered the service of Charles XII of Sweden, then engaged in the latter stages of the Great Northern War, and whom Folard considered the most talented general of his time. While in Stockholm, he set out his tactical ideas in the form of a commentary on the works of the Greek historian Polybius; he left Sweden on the grounds of ill-health in November 1717 and was shipwrecked on the voyage home, losing all his papers and baggage.

During the War of the Quadruple Alliance, Folard served under the Duke of Berwick at the Siege of San Sebastián in 1719 and was finally promoted to colonel. However, his habit of arguing with his superiors resurfaced and he wrote to the Minister of War criticising Berwick, whom he regarded as excessively cautious. With Europe finally at peace, this was the end of his active military career.

=== Retirement ===
Folard spent the next decade preparing his commentaries on Polybius, which were published in 1724 and 1729 respectively. By analysing the battles described by Polybius and adding his own insights, he sought to identify a consistent set of military principles, which included both tactics and leadership. Although some were supported by an influential minority, his contemporaries were largely unconvinced and Folard spent much of his time refuting their criticisms. After Folard's death in 1753, Frederick the Great produced a handbook or "Extract" based on his work; this excluded his ideas on columns and primarily contains Folard's account of Cassano and his claim that it proved the offensive power of the bayonet; it was this aspect that made it attractive to Frederick, who wanted to install aggressiveness into his officer corps.

During the early 1730s, Folard became involved with the Catholic theological movement known as Jansenism, in particular the faction known as Convulsionnaires. Declared heretical by the Catholic church and viewed with suspicion by the French state, his biographer suggests Folard's involvement was driven not by depth of religious feeling but antipathy towards Cardinal de Fleury, the government chief minister who was a leading opponent of Jansenism and had rejected his pleas for an increased pension. Folard was elected a Fellow of the Royal Society of London in 1750 and died on 23 March 1752 in Avignon, where a number of public buildings and streets are named after him, including the Piscine Chevalier de Folard.

== Military theories ==
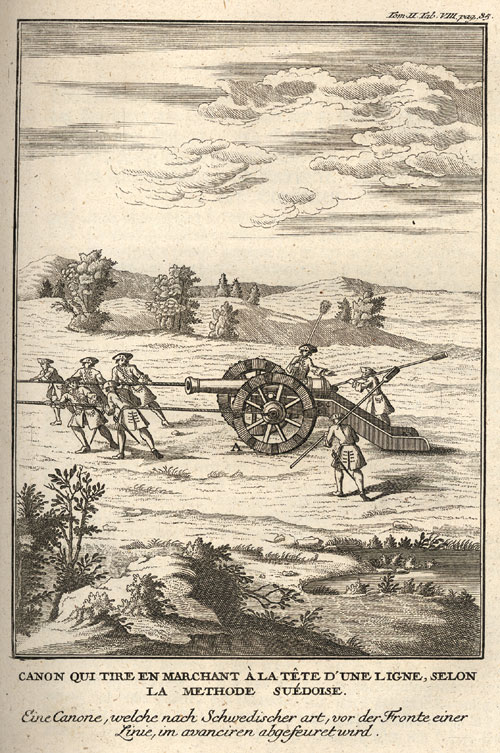
Illustration in Folard's Histoire de Polybe, showing light artillery operating in front of their lines, a method used by the Swedish military

Before the War of the Spanish Succession, the French army was viewed as the pre-eminent force in Europe but by 1714 this was no longer the case. Folard's work formed part of an extensive discussion on tactics and leadership that resulted. Although most famous for his advocacy of infantry columns rather than linear formations, his writings contain a large number of precepts. Some, such as his principles of leadership, were considered to have great merit, others less so, notably his support for the restoration of pikes, an infantry weapon considered obsolete by the mid-17th century. Maurice de Saxe, often quoted as a supporter, respected his opinions but strongly criticised many of his conclusions, while Frederick the Great argued his work contained some good ideas, but overall consisted of "diamonds buried in a dung heap". (Note: "Il avoit enfoui des diamans au milieu du fumier...")

Folard's system contained two key elements, the first being a preference for columns or Ordre profond rather than line formations, which he argued were too thin and unwieldy to be effective in offence and lacked solidity in defence. Based on an analysis of Greek battles as described by Polybius and the use of the Phalanx by generals like Epaminondas, he claimed a deep mass of troops allowed sufficient shock to attack and break enemy lines while also providing defensive stability. His second principle was the mixed Order of battle, with his columns consisting of infantry intermixed with cavalry and light guns for mutual support. (Note: Folard's proposals for how these columns would be formed and controlled, the number of men in each file or rank, the order of firing and proportions of riflemen, pikemen, cavalry etc. is lengthy and complex.)

Like Frederick the Great, many felt he made some good points but criticised the weakness of this system. Although easier and faster to manoeuvre than line formations, once in motion columns proved almost impossible to control, particularly if repulsed, a criticism Folard sidestepped by claiming their attacks never failed. His columns were also vulnerable to being outflanked and had low rates of fire, exposing one of Folard's most significant errors, his contention that modern firearms were not powerful enough to win battles on their own. While there was some merit to this argument in 1700, developments in artillery and infantry weapons meant by the 1730s this was no longer the case. Finally, his mixed order of battle meant the cavalry effectively had to move at the same pace as the infantry, neutralising their offensive ability.

Nevertheless, although his specific system was generally dismissed, his ideas and concepts retained considerable influence and gained renewed attention in the debate over tactics that followed French defeat in the 1756 to 1763 Seven Years' War, with François-Jean de Mesnil-Durand (1736–1799) being a leading advocate of his theories. His belief that the bayonet charge was particularly suited to the French "offensive spirit" resurfaced immediately before World War I in the tactics advocated by Louis Loyzeau de Grandmaison. Widely accepted, these formed the basis of Plan XVII, the French masterplan for the beginning of the war which led to enormous casualties when faced with the reality of machine guns and modern artillery.

== Publications ==
Folard wrote the following.

- Nouvelles découvertes sur la guerre dans une dissertation sur Polybe (1724);
- Histoire de Polybe, nouvellement traduite du grec par Dom Vincent Thuillier, avec un commentaire ou un corps de science militaire enrichi de notes critiques et historiques par F. de Folard (1729);
- Histoire de Scipion l'Africain, pour servir de suite aux hommes illustres de Plutarque. Avec les observations de M. le chevalier de Folard sur la bataille de Zama (1738);
- Histoire d'Épaminondas pour servir de suite aux hommes illustres de Plutarque, avec des remarques de M. le Chevalier de Folard sur les principales batailles d'Épaminondas, par M. l'abbé Séran de La Tour (1739);

== Sources ==
- Chagniot, Jean (1997). Le chevalier de Folard: La stratégie de l'incertitude (in French). Du Rocher éditions. ISBN 978-2268026145.
- Charvet, Jean Louis (2020). "Une famille avignonnaise aux XVII° et XVIII° siècles: les Folard" (in French).
- Coynart, Charles de (1914). Le chevalier de Folard, 1669-1752 (in French). Librairie Hatchette.
- El Hage, Fadi (2023). Une occasion manquée: la réédition de l’Histoire de Polybe commentée par Folard (1753). Paris: Classiques Garnier. ISBN 9782406147817.
- Frey, Linda; Frey, Marsha, eds. (1995). The Treaties of the War of the Spanish Succession: An Historical and Critical Dictionary. Greenwood. ISBN 978-0313278846.
- Gat, Azar (1992). The Development of Military Thought in the Nineteenth Century. Clarendon Press. ISBN 9780198202462.
- Quimby, Robert (1957). The Background Of Napoleonic Warfare: The Theory Of Military Tactics In Eighteenth-Century France (2011 ed.). Literary Licensing, LLC. ISBN 978-1258043827.
- Sanders, Charles W (1987). "No other law; the French Army and the doctrine of the offensive" (PDF). RAND Corporation.
- * Storring, Adam (2008). 'Le Siècle de Louis XIV': Frederick the Great and French Ways of War (PDF) (thesis). St John's Cambridge.
- Wright, John W (1931). "Some Notes on the Continental Army". The William and Mary Quarterly. 11 (2): 82–105. doi:10.2307/1921003. JSTOR 1921003.
