= Army of the Grisons =

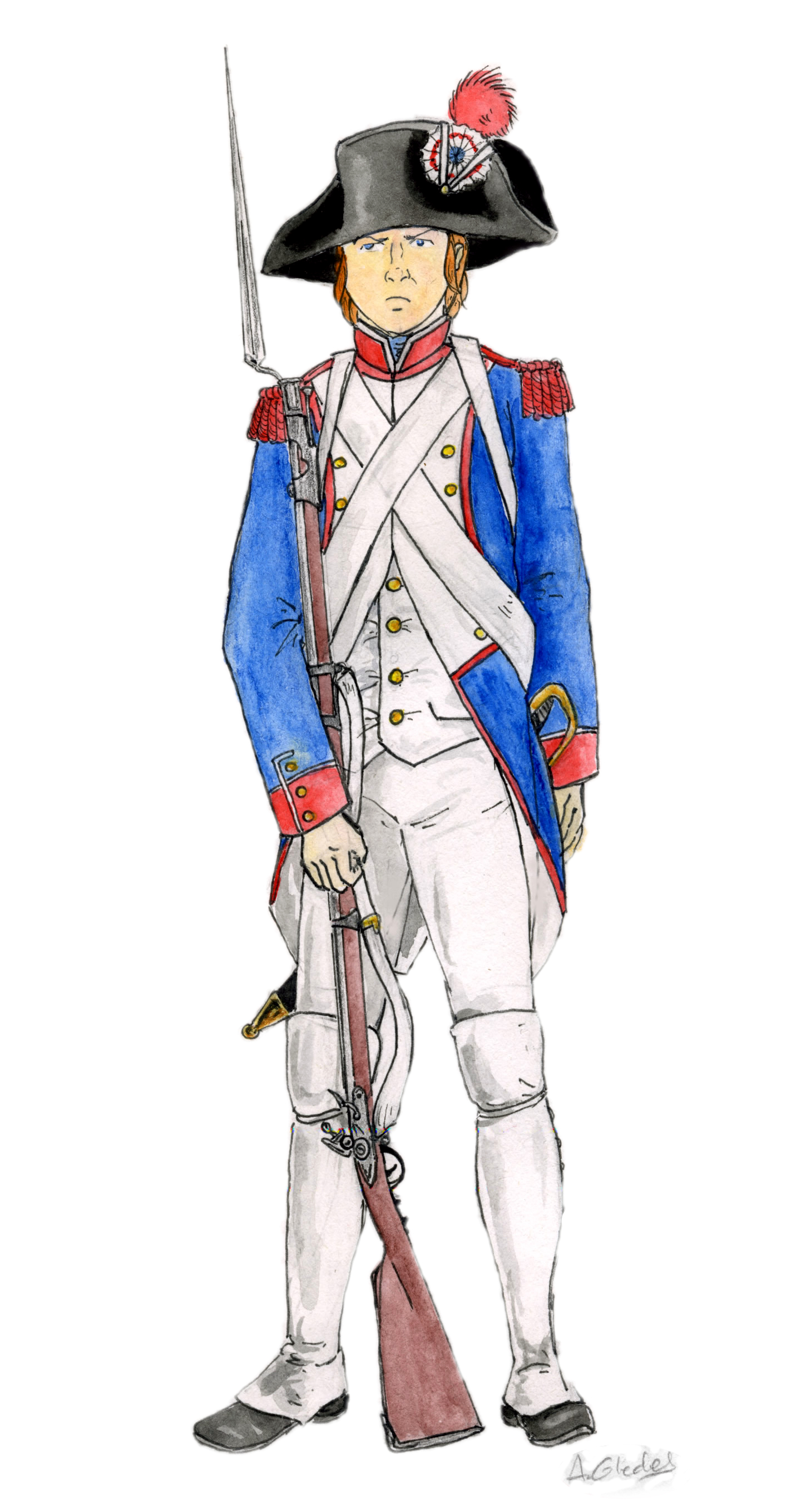
- Fusilier of a French Revolutionary Army
- Active: October 1800-April 1801
- Country: France
- Allegiance: First Republic
- Branch: French Revolutionary Army

Commanders
- Notable commanders: Etienne-Jacques-Joseph-Alexandre Macdonald

The Army of the Grisons (Armée des Grisons) was a field army of the French Revolutionary Army. Its commander-in-chief from 5 October 1800 to 1 April 1801 was Etienne-Jacques-Joseph-Alexandre Macdonald, during which time it operated as the hinge between the Army of Italy under Brune and the Army of the Rhine under Jean Moreau, crossing the Splügen (4 December) and capturing Trento (6 January).

== Operational history ==
The Army of Grisons was formed between the Army of Italy and the Army of the Rhine. Its first taste of combat occurred in December 1800, when they crossed the Alps, opposing Austrian Forces. The First Consul, Napoleon, also crossing the Alps, ordered that General Macdonald thrust forwards and occupy Austrian Tyrol. The march was slow, with 12,000 men making it through in 4 columns. It almost ended in disaster however. A wave of snow and ice fell upon the army when the last column was making it through. But Macdonald, following Napoleon's orders, moved on and encountered Austrian Forces at Mincio and routed them, turning back the frontier. They moved on to Trento, not yet forcing the Austrians out of Tryol. After the Battle of Hohenlinden, the Army was shortly disbanded in 1801 to later form part of the Grande Armée.
