= Jean du Teil =

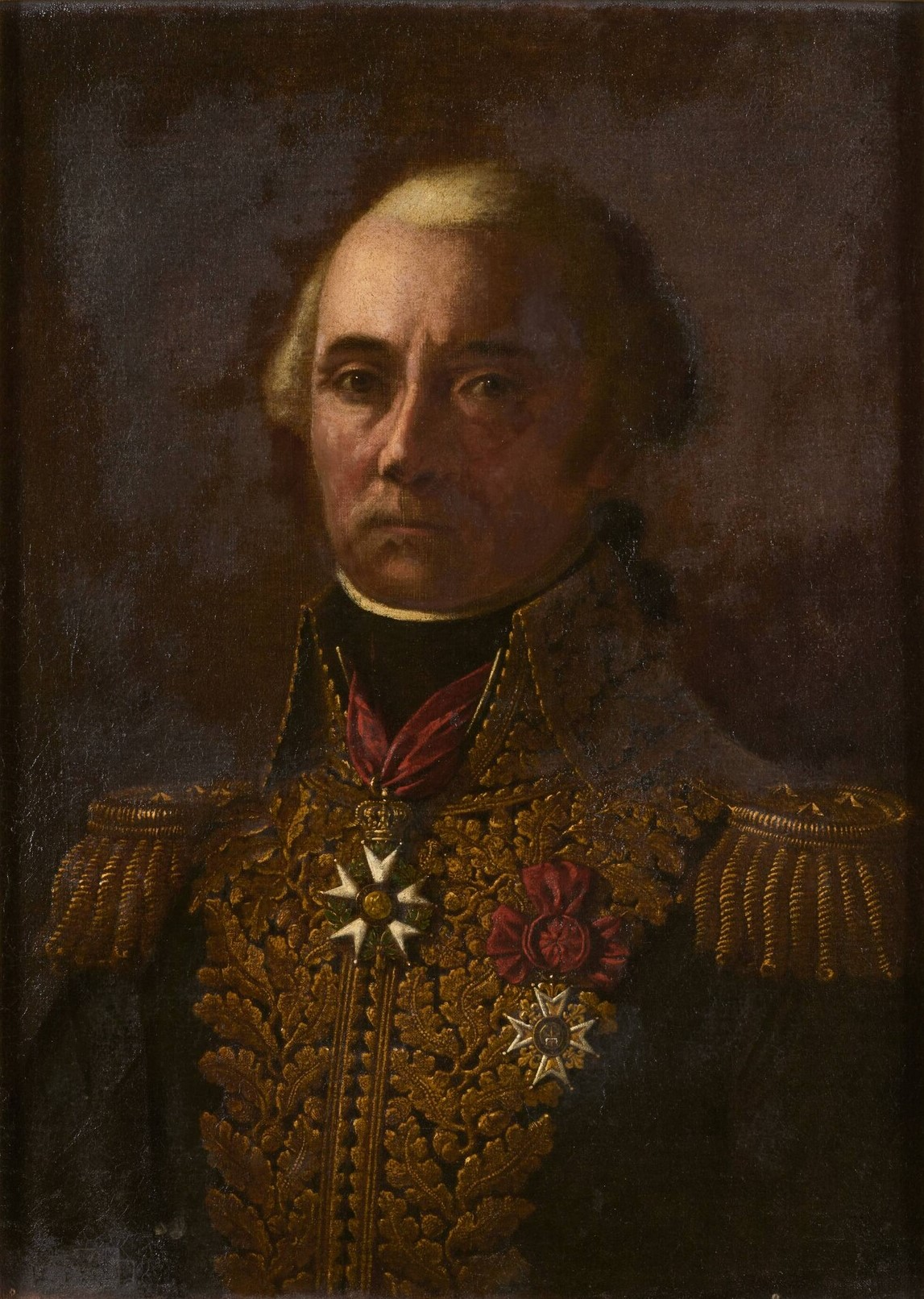
- Portrait by Henri-Édouard Massy, 1844–1852
- Born: July 7, 1738; La Côte-Saint-André
- Died: April 25, 1820 (aged 81); Ancy-sur-Moselle
- Spouse: Marguerite-Louise Georgin de Mardigny
- Children: 3
- Father: François du Teil
- Relatives: Jean-Pierre du Teil (brother)

Jean, chevalier du Teil de Beaumont (7 July 1738 – 25 April 1820), seigneur d'Ancy, was a French soldier in the Ancien Régime, Revolutionary and Imperial armies and theoretician of the use of artillery (the Gribeauval system).

== Life ==
The son of the artillery officer François du Teil (1704–1758), knight of the order of Saint-Louis, and of Marguerite de Chambaran (died 1758), he became an artillery officer himself at a very young age. Lieutenant-colonel of the régiment de Metz from 1785, he actively adhered to the principles of the Revolution, unlike his elder brother Jean-Pierre (who only accommodated rather than backed the Revolution, and was thus executed). From then on his rise within the army was meteoric: promoted to the rank of colonel in 1790, he soon became maréchal de camp (23 August 1792) then général de division (11 August 1793). He was made commander in chief of the artillery of the armée du Rhin (1792), then that of the armée des Alpes and armée d’Italie (1793), participating in the siege of Toulon.

Disdaining this last posting, he left it as soon as possible to go to command the artillery in the Alps, and the representatives of the people chose as his replacement then Brigadier General Napoleon Bonaparte, who gained his first successes in this role. Du Teil next served in the war in the Vendée in 1794. Discharged from the army as an aristocrat, he was only recalled to the ranks under the Consulate, when he was put in command of the place de Lille, then that of Metz. He was made a commander of the Légion d’Honneur then a knight of the order of Saint Louis. He retired in 1813 to the village of Ancy-sur-Moselle.

On 26 November 1771 he married Marguerite-Louise Georgin de Mardigny (daughter of François-Etienne, conseiller to the parliament of Metz, and of Barbe Lucie Besser de Charly) at Mardigny. They had 3 daughters:

- Marguerite-Louise du Teil de Beaumont (23 May 1776, Metz - ?, Metz, unmarried)
- Marguerite du Teil de Beaumont (24 January 1778, Metz - 14 March 1847, Ancy) - on 17 February 1793 married Jean-Baptiste Noirot, baron d’Empire and maréchal de camp at Strasbourg.
- Marie du Teil de Beaumont (21 February 1780, Metz - 8 February 1847, Ancy, unmarried)

== Works ==
- Manœuvres d'infanterie pour résister à la cavalerie et l'attaquer aver succès ("Infantry manoeuvres to successfully resist and attack cavalry", 1782), Metz, octavo with plates.
- Usage de l'artillerie nouvelle dans la guerre de campagne; connaissance nécessaire aux officiers destinés à commander toutes les armes (1778), Metz, octavo with plates

== Sources ==
- Biographie universelle ancienne et moderne : histoire par ordre alphabétique de la vie publique et privée de tous les hommes (Michaud), article "du Teil (le chevalier Jean)"
- J. Colin, L'éducation militaire de Napoléon, Teissèdre, coll. "Bicentenaire de l'épopée impériale", 1900 (réimpr. 2001), 16×24 cm, 396 p. (ISBN 291225955X), partie Introduction, chap. VI ("Le chevalier du Teil"), p. 96
