= Jean-Pierre du Teil =

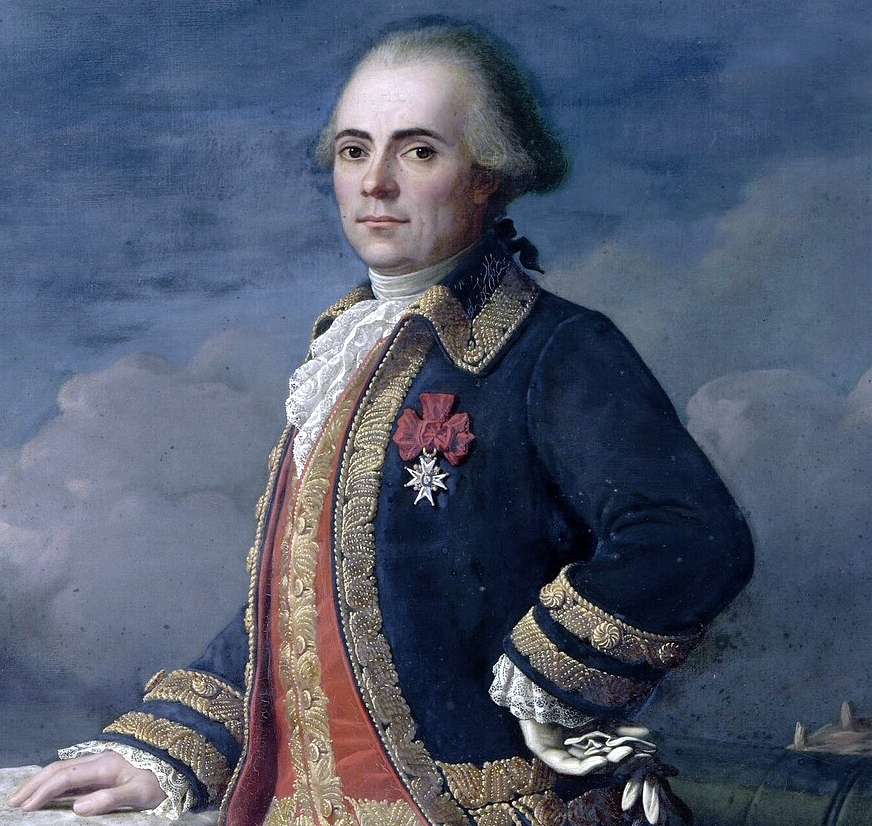
- Portrait of General du Teil
- Born: 15 July 1722; Pommier-de-Beaurepaire, France
- Died: 22 February 1794 (aged 71) Lyon, French Republic
- Allegiance: Kingdom of France
- Branch: French Army
- Service years: 1731–1794
- Rank: Général de division
- Awards: Order of Saint Louis

Jean-Pierre du Teil, baron du Teil, seigneur de Pommier, Chars, les Rousselières, Vaux and of other places (15 July 1722 – 22 February 1794) was a French artillery general and one of the most important influences on Napoleon I during his training at the École d'artillerie in Auxonne (set up in 1759).

== Life ==
The son of the artillery officer François du Teil (1704–1758), knight of the order of Saint-Louis, and of Marguerite de Chambaran (died 1758), du Teil was born at château de Pommier, La Côte-Saint-André. He was the elder brother of the artillery theorist Jean du Teil. Jean-Pierre joined the French artillery in 1731 and became a second lieutenant in 1735. He was wounded in action at the 1745 Siege of Tournai, during the War of the Austrian Succession, and was promoted to captain in 1748. He became a chevalier of the Order of Saint Louis in 1753 and was posted to Germany in 1757-58, during the Seven Years' War. He retired on medical grounds in 1760 but returned to duty the following year and became chef de brigade in 1765. He became lieutenant-colonel in 1768 and became colonel to the régiment de la Fère-Artillerie in 1777. He then became the commandant of the École militaire at Auxonne (1779) and then an infantry brigadier (1780). In 1783, he was made military governor of Auxonne and was the following year promoted to maréchal de camp. At the end of 1791, he was promoted to lieutenant général and inspector general of artillery.

In February 1794, he was arrested as a suspect and as a royalist by the military commission at Lyon, who condemned him to death. As a serving military officer, he was shot by firing squad rather than guillotined. However, Napoléon later gave 100,000 francs to the son or grandson of the baron du Teil in his memory.
