= François-Jean de Mesnil-Durand =

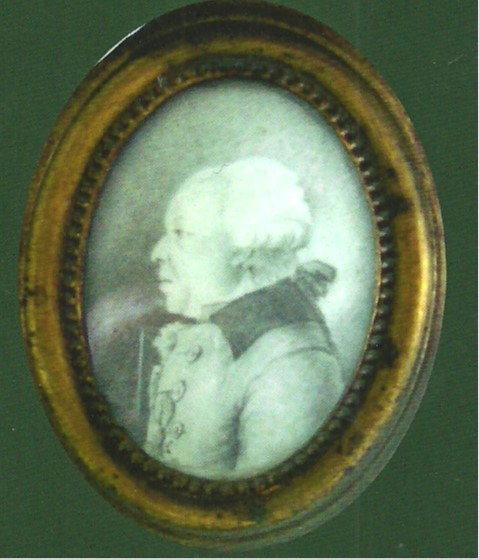
François Jean de Graindorge d'Orgeville

François Jean de Graindorge d'Orgeville, baron de Mesnil-Durand, known as François-Jean de Mesnil-Durand (1 September 1736, Mesnil-Durand - 13 thermidor year VII, i.e. 31 July 1799, London) was a French tactician. He collaborated with marshal de Broglie and supported the ordre profond.

== Works ==
- Projet d'un ordre françois en tactique, ou la phalange coupée et doublée soutenue par le mélange des armes (1755), printed by Antoine Boudet, Paris. 1 vol. in-4° (xxix, + 446p. + 16 plates)
- Fragments de tactique, ou six mémoires,... précédé d'un Discours Préliminaire sur la Tactique et sur les Systêmes (1774), libr. Ch.-Ant. Ambert, Paris. 2 vol. in-4° : lxviii + 420pp., et viii p.+144pp.+12 plates.

== Sources ==
- Louis du Bois - Notice sur Charles Graindorge d'Orgeville, Baron de Ménil-Durand in Almanach de la ville et de l'arrondissement de Lisieux pour 1839. - Lisieux : Veuve Tissot, [1839].- p. 75-80.
