= William, Viscount of Limoges =

William de Châtillon

Viscount of Limoges
- Reign: 1404 – 1455
- Predecessor: John
- Successor: Frances
- Died: 1455
- Spouse: Isabelle de la Tour d'Auvergne
- Issue: Frances
- House: House of Châtillon
- Father: John I, Count of Penthièvre
- Mother: Margaret de Clisson

William (died 1455) was Seigneur de Avesnes and Viscount of Limoges from 1404 until his death. He was also briefly Count of Périgord following the death of his brother John II, Count of Penthièvre, in 1454.

== Biography ==
William was the son of John I, Count of Penthièvre and Margaret de Clisson. As a younger son, William was intended to join the clergy. He attended the University of Angers and, while he was young, his family negotiated with the duke of Brittany to grant him the Bishopric of Vannes or Saint-Brieuc.

After Margaret de Clisson and her sons failed in their plot to overthrow John V, Duke of Brittany and assert their claim to Brittany between 1420 and 1422, the Penthièvre family was forced to appear before both the French Parliament and the Breton Estates at Vannes. Two of William's brothers were found guilty of felonies and treachery on 16 February 1425 and their properties in Brittany were confiscated. William himself had already been given over to the duke of Brittany as a hostage on 29 July 1420.

William remained a hostage at Auray for twenty-eight years, during which time he lost his sight. He was finally freed in 1448 after his family reconciled with Francis I, Duke of Brittany. In 1450, he married Isabelle de la Tour d'Auvergne, daughter of Bertrand V de La Tour d'Auvergne, with whom he had three daughters: Frances; Joan, who married John de Surgeres, seigneur de Balon; and Charlotte, who married Antoine de Villequier, seigneur de Montrésor. William inherited the County of Périgord from his brother John in 1454, but he died the following year. His daughter, Frances, succeeded him in Périgord and Limoges.

== Notes ==
French nobility
Preceded by John	Viscount of Limoges; 1404 – 1455	Succeeded by Frances
Preceded by John	Count of Périgord; 1454 – 1455	Succeeded by Frances
