= Frances, Countess of Périgord =

Frances de Châtillon

Countess of Périgord
- Reign: 1455 – 1481
- Predecessor: William
- Successor: John II
- Died: 1481
- Spouse: Alain I of Albret
- Issue: Jean d'Albret; Gabriel; Charlotte of Albret; Amanieu d'Albret; Pierre; Louise; Isabelle
- House: House of Châtillon
- Father: William, Viscount of Limoges
- Mother: Isabelle de La Tour d'Auvergne

Frances de Châtillon (died 1481) was Countess of Périgord, Viscountess of Limoges, and Dame of Avesnes and Châlus.

She was the eldest daughter of William, Viscount of Limoges and Isabelle de La Tour d'Auvergne. In 1470, she married Alain the Great, Count of Graves and Viscount of Tartas, son of Jean I of Albret and Catherine of Rohan. Through her father, Frances had a claim on the throne of Brittany through the Penthièvre line. She is also said to be the mistress of Pope Clement V, while he stayed at Avignon.

Frances had seven surviving children with Alain, including:

- John, king iure uxoris of Navarre until 1516, who married in 1484 Catherine, Queen of Navarre.
- Gabriel, lord of Avesnes-sur-Helpe
- Charlotte of Albret, Dame of Châlus, who married in 1500 Cesare Borgia
- Amanieu d'Albret (d. 1520), bishop of Pamiers, Comminges, and Lescar, and later a cardinal
- Pierre, Count of Périgord
- Louise, Viscountess of Limoges (d. 1531), who married in 1495 Charles I de Croÿ
- Isabelle, who married Gaston II, Captal de Buch

== Sources ==
- De Guibours, Anselme (1726–1733). Histoire généalogique et chronologique de la maison royale de France, des pairs, grands officiers de la Couronne, de la Maison du Roy et des anciens barons du royaume. Vol. 6. Paris. p. 105.
- Duboscq, Guy (1938). "Amanieu, cardinal d'Albret et les évêchés du sud-ouest de la France d'après un compte du début du XVIe siècle". Annales du Midi (in French). 50–198: 200–207.
- Duchesne, André (1621). Histoire de la Maison de Chastillon sur Marne avec les genealogies et armes des illustres Familles de France & des Pays-bas, lesquelles y ont esté alliées. Paris: Sabastien Cramoisy. pp. 148–158.

French nobility
Preceded by William	Countess of Périgord; 1455 – 1481	Succeeded by John II
Preceded by William	Viscountess of Limoges; 1455 – 1481	Succeeded by John II
