= Conspiracy against Jeanne d'Albret during the armed peace =

Catholic anti-Protestant conspiracies, France 1563–1567

Jeanne d'Albret, queen of Navarre, had embraced Protestantism in 1560. With the death of her husband, Antoine de Bourbon in 1562, her hands were freed to pursue a Protestant policy in her vast land holdings (chiefly concentrated in southern France, with sovereign territories on the border with Spain). In addition to facilitating the adoption of Protestantism in her lands, she also made the practice of Catholicism more legally restrictive, before outright banning the practice of the religion in her territories in 1566.

In and around her lands in the south, there were many Catholic nobles who opposed Jeanne's policies. They were able to look to Philip II of Spain and Pope Pius IV for support in their campaign against her. In 1563, the Pope attempted to excommunicate the queen of Navarre, though he would ultimately back down, after the French crown rallied to the support of Jeanne. Meanwhile, the Spanish sovereign formed connections with Catholic nobles in France, chief among whom the seigneur de Monluc, lieutenant-general of Guyenne. In 1564, a meeting would take place at Grenade-sur-Garonne bringing together the leadership of the southern Catholic nobility who opposed Jeanne. After word of this meeting leaked, the queen of Navarre would accuse the assembled nobles of having made plots to hand over French territory to the Spanish, as well as to ruin her.

Parallel to this, the queen of Navarre fell into dispute with her uncle, fr:Pierre d'Albret, the Catholic bishop of Comminges. Alienated by her actions, the bishop entered Spanish service and attended the meeting at Grenade-sur-Garonne. Ultimately, he would lose the support of Philip, and he would die in exile in 1567.

In the queen of Navarre's lands, several rebellions would erupt in 1567, after the outlawing of Catholicism, in Foix, Béarn and lower-Navarre. Jeanne and her allies would succeed in besting these revolts, but at the expense of making concessions to the Catholic religion.

== Queen of Navarre ==
=== Family affairs ===
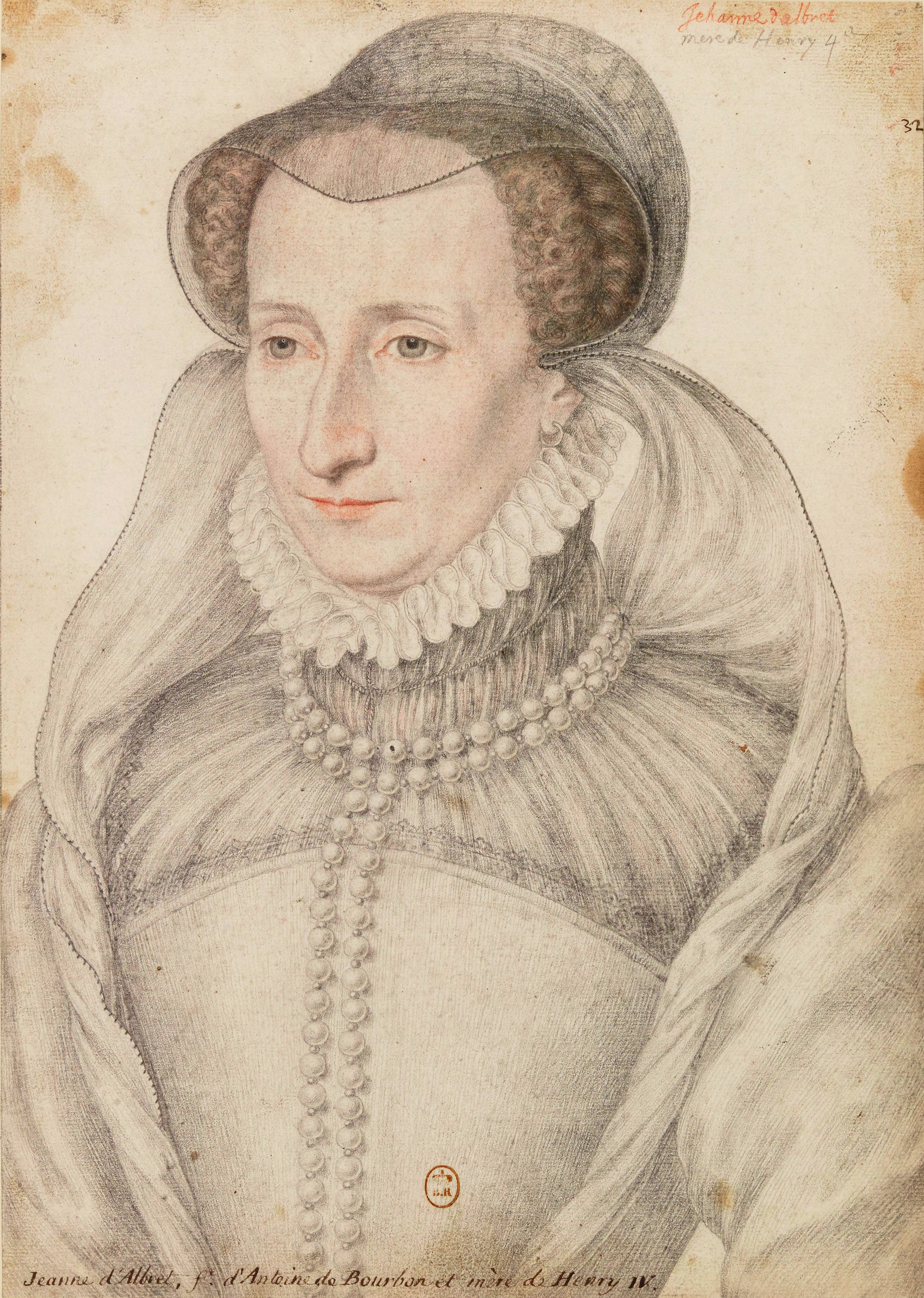
Jeanne d'Albret, queen of Navarre, leading Protestant noble in the kingdom of France and her own sovereign territories

Some of the queen of Navarre's territories, including the lower kingdom of Navarre (lighter shade of red), the vicomté de Béarn, the comté de Bigorre, the comté de Foix, the duché d'Albret (only a seigneurie at the time of this map), the vicomté de Limoges, and the comté de Périgord, other territories coloured not part of Jeanne d'Albret's patrimony

The queen of Navarre, Jeanne d'Albret was a great feudatory of the French crown. She was a haut justicier (one who enjoys the right of high justice), and held more than twenty fiefs from the French crown among which were the duchés (duchies) d'Albret, de Vendôme, de Beaumont; the comtés de Foix, de Bigorre, d'Armagnac, de Rodez, de Marle, and de Périgord; and the vicomtés de Limoges, de Quercy and Marsan. Outside of these, she was entirely sovereign in the territories of Béarn, Navarre, and Soule.

Jeanne was pleasantly surprised to see, that her son, the prince de Béarn (future king of France Henri IV), was permitted to receive Protestant tutors (Beauvoir and La Gaucherie) again by the Queen Mother Catherine de' Medici. This had been the subject of complaint from her in letter of March 1563.

In Babelon's estimation, the queen of Navarre was increasingly the soul of the Protestant cause in France. In her hôtel (a grand townhouse) in Paris a meeting was held between Jeanne and the prince de Condé, admiral de Coligny and prince de Porcien as to the future of the Protestant cause. The latter figures keen to seek her advice.

=== Early Religious policy ===
In the lands of the queen of Navarre, in particular Béarn, a nominal toleration of both Protestantism and Catholicism existed. This was not the reality on the ground however, as Protestantism was ascendant everywhere.

On 30 May 1563, Jeanne abolished the Corpus Christi procession in her lands. This came in for rebuke from the parlement of Bordeaux (parlement, most senior class of courts in France, also responsible for registering royal edicts). The Estates of Béarn which met in June were likewise frustrated. A small majority of the Second Estate (the nobility), and a large majority of the Third Estate (the commons) made protest to her. The queen of Navarre dismissed the protest on the grounds of a technical error in its submission. She was always thinking of the welfare of her subjects, but her resolution would stand.

The establishment of Protestantism in Jeanne's lands, turning them into a new Geneva, was overseen by the pastor Pierre Viret, an esteemed reformer.

Itinerant preachers were to spread Protestantism as they travelled, financially supported by the villages they passed through. The funds of benefices to be redirected towards Protestants or support for the poor.

This blow against Catholicism was followed by the removal of images from the churches of Lescar and Pau. Her pastor Merlin would write about how he drove the queen of Navarre further, to fully prohibit Mass, or other 'Papal superstitions' in the churches of Lescar in July.

Merlin was responsible for establishing a system of ecclesiastical discipline in the mould of Geneva (the centre of the Calvinist branch of Protestantism) in her lands. On 1 June, John Calvin was able to inform the queen of Navarre that they had found a dozen men to serve as ministers, as she had requested. Once she had succeeded in instilling order in her lands, she was to release Merlin from her service back to Geneva.

In July 1563, Jeanne resolved to purge Catholic paraphernalia from the churches of her territories.

The Catholics looked to move the fight to the Estates of Béarn. Meeting in August, their remonstrances were drawn up under the leadership of the seigneur de Saint-Colomme to present to the royal council at Pau on behalf of the Catholics of Béarn and Navarre. This appeal was rejected by the procureur général on the grounds that it was contrary to the will of the queen of Navarre, and Jeanne herself chastised the Estates for their presumption, ordering Saint-Colomme to retire in disgrace.

On 20 September 1563, at the Protestant synod of Pau, presided over by the pastor Merlin, a tax was imposed on the Catholic clergy for the benefit of the Protestant ministers, and Protestant colleges were established at Lescar and Orthez. It was voted to request of Geneva that Merlin be leant to them for another year (it having been the plan that he would return to Geneva).

==== Desire for accelerated progress ====
Merlin was despondent about the state of the religion in the queen of Navarre's lands. He did not blame Jeanne for the troubles and wanted Calvin to continually reinforce this feeling in his letters with the Queen. He bemoaned that her advisors were opposed to the measures she was undertaking, and that the people were agitated by propaganda. He dismissed the fears of the people as groundless, as it was not their intention to overthrow the magistrate, or elevate new popes. Even more problematic than the enemies of Protestantism were its friends. These Protestants tried to stall out the progress towards the establishment of their faith with reference to the dangers of the seigneur de Monluc (co-lieutenant-general of the crown for the province of Guyenne, second in command to the governor), the Spanish, and the French crown. They claimed to lack the means to act, and proposed delay until the counsel of the Protestant leaders, the prince de Condé and admiral de Coligny might be sought.

Nobles mourned the loss of their control over benefices, and either wished for monetary compensation, or the right to choose Protestant ministers. The queen of Navarre was inexperienced, lacked a trustworthy man in her household, and was in poor financial straits. In his July letter to Calvin, Merlin mentioned that the queen of Navarre had resisted his proposal to inventory the ecclesiastical wealth of her territories, as a prelude to its confiscation. Jeanne had also not permitted Merlin to pursue a public disputation with Catholic priests.

Come his December letter to Calvin, Merlin's opinion on the queen of Navarre had cooled somewhat. Though she continued to show zeal for the cause, the full abolition of 'idolatry' in her lands had not come to pass, and he did believe the prospects of its happening were good. Her hatred of the Papacy was not as fierce as it once was, thanks to the presence of Spanish soldiers on the frontier. The pastor complained of Jeanne's advisors who thought him too extreme for trying to overthrow the Papacy. He explained how the queen of Navarre had challenged him as being out of touch with the conditions on the ground, noting that Calvin and de Beza (Calvin's second-in-command) would agree with her. If Catholicism was fully abolished, as Merlin proposed, the people would rather take no religion than Protestantism.

A Protestant college was established in Lescar in 1563 under Jeanne's direction. In 1566 it would become an academy and would move to Orthez. Roelker describes the move to Orthez as coming in response to protests in Lescar, with a Jacobin order of Orthez being ordered to vacate from a premises in Orthez to accommodate the Protestant college.

==== Spifame ====
In the first months of 1564, the former Catholic bishop and now Protestant pastor, Spifame became Jeanne's chancellor. The queen of Navarre had requested his services from Geneva in January, noting his excellent qualities. The two fell out badly within a year, with Jeanne dismissing him for 'betraying her interests'. Spifame returned to Geneva, from where he denounced the queen of Navarre's court as being under the domination of Merlin, Jeanne sent a representative to Geneva to complain about him. Bitter quarrel followed, with Spifame charging that Jeanne was in a relationship with Merlin, and that the prince de Béarn was illegitimate. The queen of Navarre shot back that Spifame's marriage was perhaps not legal. Further, that he was undertaking negotiations with senior persons in France to convert to Catholicism in return for the bishopric of Toul. A few weeks after the queen of Navarre made the matter a criminal one, Spifame was charged with treason against the city of Geneva, as well as adultery, and put to death.

Before her departure for court, the queen of Navarre reorganised her sovereign council and established a new council for ecclesiastical affairs. The comte de Gramont presided over the 20 March first meeting of the council and wrote warmly on it to Catherine on 21 March. Jeanne's territories were proceeding well in her absence, with all her subjects in a state of satisfaction. He complimented the influence of Spifame on affairs, Spifame favouring moderation and slow policy in contrast with Merlin.

A synod met on 14 March 1564 under the presidency of Merlin. This synod afforded responsibilities to Spifame, such as the urging of the queen of Navarre to establish the Protestant college of Orthez, and draw up oaths for the teachers to swear to.

=== Descurra's mission ===
The Spanish agent Juan Martinez Descurra met with Jeanne for an interview on 3 August 1563. He expressed his shock at her destruction of Catholicism, a feat 'never before done by a baptised Christian'. Both the Papacy and all Catholic princes must surely be her enemies, and she would be destroyed to avenge her injuries to god. Descurra reported that she became pale at this and queried how a prince could be concerned by what she did in her own domains, especially when what she was doing was furthering the cause of the gospel. Descurra leapt in to correct her, stating she was not doing good but rather evil, and reminding her that her lands abutted the Spanish lands, and Philip would ill-tolerate Protestantism so close to his subjects. Descurra handed her a letter from Philip. To this, Jeanne responded that Philip well anticipated her actions, but that his conclusions were wrong. For she was in the religion of her late husband and parents and had ascended to government at the behest of god to govern it in accordance with his gospel. She queried why he would threaten her, but not queen Elizabeth of England, who was also Protestant and had done to the churches the same things she had. Descurra explained that justice would come for Elizabeth in time, but for the moment she was easier to deal with. If she did not amend her ways, she would lose her possessions on this side of the Garonne river, and the house of Navarre and Foix would be erased. He advised her to arrest those who had led her down this path, burn them at the stake, and restore Catholicism to its pre-eminent position. Jeanne indicated she had no intention of following this course, she had consulted learned men and believed she was serving god well.

Descurra subsequently spoke with the seigneur d'Audaux, who Descurra alleged to have inquired whether there was a remedy to the evil. Descurra recounted his conversation with Jeanne from the day before, and reported that Audaux agreed with his position, bemoaning that he had fallen out of favour for trying to stop the Queen. Audaux is to have rebuked the seigneur de Coligny and Catherine for respectively encouraging and not hindering Jeanne.

==== Conversation with Álava ====
Around the Autumn of 1566, the Spanish ambassador, Álava, reported that he had enjoyed conversations with the queen of Navarre in which she had expressed her desire to free herself from the other leaders of the Protestant party (Condé, Coligny and Gramont). He alleges that she spoke of her esteem for king Philip and even imagined the reunification of the kingdom of Navarre under Spanish dominion. Álava asked Philip how he should proceed in this matter. Philip advised him to proceed with caution in detaching her, so as not to arouse issues with Charles. Álava would later advise driving a wedge between her and the governor of Béarn, Gramont, and get the latter figure, who was responsible for troubles inside the Spanish frontier, out of the position of governor.

=== Quarrel with Armagnac ===
The queen of Navarre's actions were to the great vexation of the Catholic clergy. On 18 August 1563, the cardinal d'Armagnac, cousin of Jeanne, wrote to her warning her that the prospect of condemnation by the Catholic church loomed. He expressed his sadness that he understood recent events in Lescar to have been undertaken in her presence. Evil advisors, like wolf in sheep's clothing, undertook a doomed attempt to inoculate Protestantism in her lands, something that would never be accepted by her people. Forcing consciences would bring about rebellion, and she lacked the protection from Spain that the ocean provided the English Queen. He plead that she show respect for her ancestors and provide an intact patrimony for her children. He cautioned her against limiting herself to the gospel alone in her approach to religion. He positioned himself as her oldest and most faithful servant as he begged her to 'abandon the wolves' and return to the Catholic fold.

Facing off against Armagnac, the queen of Navarre defended herself in a point-by-point rebuttal of his arguments. She noted how she put more faith in the bible than the 'doctors' (of theology) that Armagnac would have her trust. Rather than be surrounded by evil counsellors, she was in truth accompanied by men who not only wore religious vestments but abided by the teachings of the faith. She was not the religious innovator as Armagnac might charge, but rather a restorer, bringing the Christian faith back to its ancient condition. She denied compelling Catholics to convert or face death and imprisonment. Armagnac had spoken of the neighbours of her lands, and she took each neighbour in turn. Regarding the Spanish king, Philip II, she accepted the two hated the faith of the other but assured herself that they would continue to live in peace. Though she lacked the waters that protected England from Spain, she had the grace of god to protect her territories from depredations. As for the king of France, Charles IX, she denied that he hated Protestantism, noting that he permitted its exercise among the princes around him. Her pursuits did not compromise the patrimony her son would inherit, but rather augmented them, as they brought his lands closer to god. In relation to Protestant atrocities, she argued that one should take care of their own affairs before critiquing those of others, highlighting those Protestants killed by Catholics. This did not mean she stood by everything done in the name of Protestantism, and she conceded that in places evil had been done under the veil of Protestantism. Protestant preachers, contrary to what Armagnac might think, preached patience, humility, and deference to temporal authority.

She, and the Genevan authorities, were interested in a church council, but only if it were a free one, as they remembered well the treatment of Jan Hus at the Council of Constance. Jeanne took the offensive, launching an attack on Armagnac as an idolator, a heretic, and evil. He was, and those like him were in her estimation '(a) disciple(s) of the prince of darkness'. She informed him that she would be sorrowful until such time as he recanted his error, and until such time as that came to pass, could no longer consider herself his cousin and friend.

This letter of Jeanne's was printed and widely circulated.

=== Absence at court ===
The royal tour of the kingdom allowed the queen of Navarre to continue to drag out her coming to court. She eventually left Béarn towards the end of March. But rather than make for the court, she announced that she was heading to her territory of Limoges, and she wrote the court that once she was aware of their route, she would intercept them before Lyon.

After her dismissal from court, Jeanne was instructed by Catherine to make for her duché de Vendôme. She would not stay there though, and her correspondence reveals that she spent time at La Flèche, and conducted meetings with the Coligny-Châtillon in a fief of theirs in November 1564.

The queen of Navarre bent the provision of the edict of Amboise permitting nobles enjoying high justice to conduct worship in their residences, outside of the places outlined in the edict of Amboise. She held her Protestant worship in churches.

=== July ordinances ===
Around May 1566, a Protestant synod was undertaken at the place of Nay, the order for its convention having gone out in April. The presiding officer of this assembly came to the queen of Navarre. The representative complained at the slow progress of Protestantism, the religion still being a minority. They argued that simply favouring Protestantism was inadequate, Catholicism must be eliminated, and idolatry suppressed.

In July 1566, from Paris Jeanne issued a series of ordinances relating to her lands which restricted Catholic worship. Their sermons were prohibited, as were their processions and Catholic collections. Catholicism was to be extirpated from her lands. A prohibition was declared on blaspheming, drunkenness, prostitution and certain dances. Gambling was clamped down on through the banning of the sale of dice and cards. Begging was also forbidden.

Brunet describes these regulations as a 'Puritan code'. Pierre Viret was established as the director of the Orthez college, which he was to run in the Genevan fashion. The provision of benefices was also amended in such a way as to antagonise the nobility at large.

The comte de Gramont suspended the implementation of the July ordinance on a temporary basis on the grounds that it's puritanical nature would arouse opposition from not only Catholics but also Protestants. Protestations that it was a violation of the queen of Navarre's own previous laws, as well as custom, flowed in. The Catholic bishops too protested, but the sale of church property would continue over their objections.

Roelker notes that the liquidation of Catholicism would have to await her return from the capital.

The queen of Navarre wrote de Beza on 6 December 1566, inquiring of him how best to abolish 'idolatry' in its entirety in her sovereign estates. It was not a matter of the rightness of the policy but rather the practicalities of instituting it in light of the 'backwardness' of her people. She proffered the possibility of public religious debates as a strategy.

At this time, Jeanne was aggrieved concerning the expulsion of Protestant ministers from the lands, as well as attempts by the French crown to revalue her currency.

==== Scandal in Paris ====
In November 1566, Jeanne's chaplain preached publicly within the walls of Paris. Hésperien is supposed to have delivered a sermon before a crowd of 3,000, at least according to the denunciation of the Sorbonne. This occasioned bitter protests from Catholics. The actions were a mockery of the edict of Amboise. Placards were thrown up urging the population to burn and kill the Protestants. The preacher Simon Vigor delivered a sermon in which he stated that if Protestants were allowed to preach within Paris, they would all be burned. Both Hésperien and another pastor, who Roelker suspects to be a certain Barbaste, were forced to flee.

Charles ordered the bailli of Paris to apprehend the queen of Navarre's pastors even if it means entering her household. They were to be hanged. The queen of Navarre defended the Protestant service she had held on the grounds that it was a private one, attended by fewer than 50 persons. Charles retorted that it was a violation of his edict, and that he would cease to enforce the edict entirely if she defied it, which would be to the considerable detriment of the Protestants. The pastor in question was able to escape. Charles threatened to hang the prévôt who failed in securing the pastor.

Jeanne protested that Catherine showed more favour to Philip than to the King's friends and relatives, something Catherine dismissed, arguing Philip was a son and brother to the French crown.

Jeanne was still to be found in Paris on 23 January, with the English ambassador reporting that her son was playing 'charge the barrier' alongside the King and his brothers. Come 26 January, she, the prince de Condé, the admiral de Coligny, and the prince de Béarn had all departed. The queen of Navarre's leave was taken on the grounds of showing her son those of his patrimonies that he had not yet visited (in Picardy, Maine, Vendôme, Beaumont-sur-Sarthe, and La Flèche. The queen of Navarre had permission to go to La Flêche, and it was here she travelled in the final days of January, and from where she learned of the troubles in Béarn. Catherine was informed of their departure a few days after it had transpired by the Spanish ambassador, and expressed astonishment. Catherine is to have noted that she had just leant Jeanne 2,000 écus on the grounds of the latter's poverty, something which made the act all the more incensing. The queen of Navarre would later claim to have secured permission for the departure of her and her son, but Palma-Cayet reported that she only appraised the court of her plans after her departure.

The Spanish ambassador, more well appraised than Catherine, informed the queen mother that she had been deceived by Jeanne. He informed Catherine that Jeanne had no intention to return to the French court. Indeed, after a brief stay in La Flèche, the mother and son withdrew first to Poitou and then to her domains in Gascony. Around this time, Monluc became aware of the Protestant parties war preparations.

Now in the south without leave, the young prince de Béarn declared himself in accordance with his mother's faith, and her policies. This shattered the work Catherine had done to bind the prince to the royal children. Knecht describes this moment as effectively a rebellion by the queen of Navarre, showing the prince de Béarn to be a Protestant Albret rather than a Catholic Bourbon.

== Pierre d'Albret ==
=== Spanish efforts to rationalise the ecclesiastical border ===
On the border between France and Spain, bishoprics bled across the boundary. This was the case with the French border bishopric of Comminges, part of the diocese of which was in the Val d'Aran in two archpriestships of Spain. In addition to this situation that the historian Brunet describes as 'unique', it lay between the territories of Foix and Béarn which were seeing the blossoming of Protestant worship and was more tightly bordered by Couserans and Bigorre, both of which had shown some openness to Protestant propaganda, though maintaining themselves in the Catholic fold. Even inside the diocese, which was firmly Catholic, the house of Foix (and thus now the house of Albret) had held territories, specifically at Nébouzan around Saint-Gaudens and the barony d'Aspet.

During this period, the Spanish king Philip II looked to amend this situation. This instinct derived from a need to adapt the Spanish diocese to the work of pastoral care, surveil the Moriscos (Muslims who had converted to Catholicism), and combat the possibility of a Protestant 'infection' spreading into Spain. Through this act, external authorities would cease to be able to involve themselves in Spanish affairs.

In 1563, he petitioned the Papacy on the matter. Three years later, Pius V granted his request, allowing the Spanish bishop of Urgell, Pedro de Castellet, to install a vicar in the Val d'Aran. This was communicated to the councillors of the territory by the châtelain of the val d'Aran, Gaspard de Mur, who brought the letters of Philip II and the Pope on 31 December 1565. For the moment however, the bishops of Urgell lacked the means to actually make their episcopal authority felt in the Val d'Aran. In 1565, Philip II sought from the Papacy the rights to subordinate the convent of Augustinians in the Aran to the diocese of Urgell. The Augustinians would resist this, and would be supported by the population which resented Philip's efforts. Around the same time, the Spanish inquisition also attempted to assert itself in the val d'Aran.

A similar operation to this was conducted by Philip in relation to the diocese of Bayonne further west. Here, he had appointed a vicar and secured from the Pope that the valley of Valcarlos be severed from the French bishopric and united with that of Pamplona. This effort was affected by a brief from Pius V of 1566. This was not consistent with the policy of a matching political and ecclesiastical border as the parish of Valcarlos contained three villages on the French side of the Nive river (Arnéguy, Uhalde and Ondarolle) which by the terms of the Papal bull were maintained with the Spanish parts of Valcarlos.

=== Strategic importance of Comminges ===
In 1565, Álava emphasised for Philip the importance of controlling Saint-Bertrand-de-Comminges. The governor of the place was appointed by the bishop, and Álava was able to assure himself of the loyalty of this man (a certain m. de Palatz), his emissary meeting with them. Brunet speculates that Álava himself might have met with Palatz. Álava saw danger in the cross-border trade of horses via the val d'Aran. Such trade could provide succour to a Protestant army.

=== Pierre d'Albret ===
The queen of Navarre's great-uncle, Pierre d'Albret (also rendered Pedro de Albret), was appointed to the bishopric of Comminges on the queen of Navarre's direction in May 1561. Brunet notes that it would have been more prudent for Jeanne to seek a bishopric further away from the Spanish border for her Uncle.

=== Departure from Trent ===
In August 1563, Comminges wrote to Catherine asking for permission to withdraw from the council of Trent. This withdrawal was sought for several reasons. He hoped to oppose the current royal effort to alienate church temporal lands. He also hoped to unite with other prelates who were seeking to exempt themselves from payments of tithes and royal justice. A further drive for his absence concerned the nature of his bishopric, which crossed the French border with Spain, two of his archpriests being in the Spanish ruled Val d'Aran. Philip II, king of Spain, had summoned the cortes of Monzón, with all prelates due to attend. He noted to Catherine, that should he fail to make an appearance, the Spanish parts of his diocese, the val d'Aran, would be stripped from him and thus from the kingdom of France.

A final reason Comminges was keen to make his return related to his niece, the queen of Navarre, though this was not mentioned to Catherine but rather in a letter to the Spanish ambassador Francès de Álava in March 1564. While absent at Trent, the incomes of his diocese were taken, and Protestant clients of Jeanne installed in the bishopric. In securing his appointment to the diocese in 1560, Pierre had promised to pay 15,000 ducats to the king of Navarre. To secure this simony, Navarre had sought the allocation of the revenues of the bishopric to himself. Upon his death in 1562, 10,000 had been paid. Jeanne believed herself entitled to the continuation of this arrangement, but Pierre felt differently. For the Bishop, he saw no obligations for the king of Navarre's heirs, and further believed that he had received only 800 ducats for his services, in return for the 15,000 he had been required to hand over for his presentation to Charles IX for the vacant see. Catherine had written to the Bishop, in hopes of seeing a pension granted for the bastard son of Jeanne's late husband, Charles de Bourbon. Pierre gave his response during August of that year, in the same letter as he requested the right to withdrawal from Trent.

The Spanish king Philip took up the case of the bishop of Comminges in a letter to Catherine of 22 January 1564, writing simultaneously to his ambassador in France, Chantonnay. Pierre was defended against Charles de Bourbon in this correspondence. In March, with no response forthcoming from Catherine, Philip again wrote to her, as well as to his new representative in France, Francès de Álava.

In Brunet's opinion, it is possible that as early as the meeting of the cortes of Monzón, that the bishop of Comminges' allegiance now lay with the Spanish king. He had indeed been an informant of the Spanish King from 1560. The Spanish King had assured him in 1560 he might be able to receive certain annuities for the Navarrese priory of Roncevaux.

=== Seizure of the revenues ===
Having claimed the incomes of the diocese, in March 1564, Jeanne seized them in favour of Charles de Bourbon. In addition to seizing the income she took the property, forges and furniture of the bishop. The queen of Navarre argued, with the support of her brothers-in-law, the Protestant prince de Condé, and Catholic cardinal de Bourbon that Pierre d'Albret had only ever been made bishop of Comminges In commendam (a temporary receipt of the incomes until a new priest could be found to fill the charge). In his March letter to Álava, Pierre claimed Protestants had bought a mendacious lawsuit against him with Protestant witnesses, designed to see him dispossessed of his charge by Catherine and the royal council. He noted that many bishops in Gascony had been deposed in this fashion. Charles, he said, opposed this effort.

=== Spanish advocacy ===
The bishop continued in his correspondence with the Spanish ambassador that this was all part of a blackmail plot against him. In his view, Jeanne hoped to bend him into becoming a Protestant, take the place of Saint-Gaudens and see Protestant preaching permitted in Comminges. It was to this end that Jeanne was attempting to destroy him. Pierre assured Álava that he would rather die than allow this to come to pass.

Writing to Catherine in March, Philip commended Pierre d'Albret for his residency in his diocese in 'dangerous times'. Pierre and his family would indeed reside in his see.

Indeed, in April 1564, in the wake of the meeting at Grenade, Protestants broke into the collegiate church of Saint-Gaudens, killing three and putting the rest to flight. The bishop of Comminges remarked bitterly that he dare not visit the church given the orders the queen of Navarre had established. He believed his niece intended to capture and kill him.

Upon his return to France, Chantonnay brought with him letters for Pierre from Philip.

Comminges allegiance now no longer to the French king, and he took refuge in the val d'Aran, undertaking trips to Barcelona as in March 1564, before following the Spanish court to Valencia. Pierre was assisted in his fugitive status, by the people of the val d'Aran, who little desired to be annexed by the bishop of Urgell.

=== Turning the screws ===
The seigneur Saint-Sulpice interrogated the bishop of Comminges on his presence at the Spanish court, quizzing why it was with Philip that he was seeking an end to the pension he (Comminges) owed Charles de Bourbon. He asked what confidence this showed in the justice the Queen Mother could provide. While initially believing in the validity of this pretext for Comminges' presence, it soon became clear to the Ambassador that the Bishop was engaging in plots.

When he confronted Philip about his generous welcome to the renegade Bishop, Philip defended their relationship as only relating to the securing of letters in Pierre's favour concerning the enjoyment of his possessions in France. He reported on this by letter of 11 May to Catherine. The queen of Navarre succeeded in detaching Philip from the bishop of Comminges. She did this through a representative sent to the Spanish court, a certain Savari Larboust, the seneschal of Nébouzan (to whom she provided letters in April 1564). The bishop of Comminges thought Larboust was in fact there to pry as to Philip's plans against her Protestantism. Brunet concurs with this assessment, seeing Comminges as involving himself in the plot to dispossess Jeanne and seize her lands, using his status as a descendant of the kings of Navarre. This Larboust worked alongside Saint-Sulpice. The former discredited Pierre d'Albret in Philip's eyes, the latter worked on Élisabeth, convincing her to intervene with her husband to stop him associating with the 'thief'.

Pierre d'Albret denounced Jeanne's ecclesiastical council for inventing the 'Grenade-sur-Garonne' affair and allying herself with the Ottomans.

Aware that he had little hope of securing his bishopric again, in both March and April 1564, Pierre requested from Philip that he be granted the principality of Enghien and a Spanish pension. Aligned with the Spanish, Pierre could imagine the possibility that, upon Jeanne's dispossession from the kingdom of Navarre, he could receive her inheritance, rather than Philip.

=== Decline and fall ===
Pierre attempted to establish a negotiated exit with the French crown, by which he would resign his benefice to a candidate chosen by one of his creditors the seigneur de Castelnau, but Charles was opposed to it.

In July, the bishop of Comminges secretly returned to the Spanish court again, staying there until 20 August at which point he departed for the val d'Aran.

Charles was greatly put out by the long stay of Pierre in the Spanish court. On 18 August, he informed the bishop, via Saint-Sulpice, that he could be assured of the most favourable treatment if he put himself before the French King. But he would have to explain his actions.

Saint-Sulpice maintained a close eye on him, at the direction of the queen of Navarre. In September, he was able to inform her that he had uncovered all those actions hostile to her performed by Pierre in Spain. Shortly after this point, Philip jettisoned the renegade bishop of Comminges.

With no prospect of returning to his bishopric or securing the Navarrese inheritance. Pierre again requested of Philip receipt of the principality of Enghien by virtue of his descent from Jean d'Albret. In March 1565, Álava advised Philip to hold Pierre d'Albret in suspicion and cease interventions in favour of his restoration to the bishopric. Around this time, Pierre was once more planning a trip to the Spanish court with the support of the Aranese. He hoped to secure Philip's support for his campaign.

The death knell of his ambitions came that year. The parlement of Toulouse ordered the seizure of parts of the bishoprics incomes to pay for repairs in March 1565, he was then condemned in turn before the seneschal of Toulouse (by royal letter in September), the grand council in Paris, and finally the parlement of Toulouse. The result of this was a 4 January 1566 condemnation where he was charged with various crimes (extortion, embezzlement, counterfeiting, bearing arms, and violating royal ordinances) subject to eternal banishment with his property to be seized.

Pierre d'Albret was then excommunicated by pope Pius V. Charles IX appointed Luigi d'Este, the archbishop of Auch, to administer the diocese.

Despite his condemnation, the clergy of Comminges continued to recognise their former bishop. The vicar general declared himself as acting under Pierre's authority in his absence from his see.

In February 1567, Pierre signed the Acordats (an agreement first made between the territory and the king of Aragon in the fourteenth-century that ended tensions between the two) of the val d'Aran in secret. By this document a great deal of autonomy was afforded the val d'Aran. A Papal bull of the priests of Bossòst from 1552 was inserted into the Accordats thereby extending the benefits of the Bull to the entire valley. The right of spoilation (forceful seizure of lands or goods) was also forbidden. Neither Philip II nor the vicar of Aran were made aware of this.

The treasonous bishop would ultimately end his days in his homeland of Navarre, dying on 28 August 1567 at Estella. Philip was keen to stop the sending of his will to Béarn, so that he might prevent its execution. He congratulated the viceroy of Navarre on its intercept in October 1567, as well as the letter from the executors to Jeanne. An alternate will appeared, drawn up the day before Pierre's death, which became the subject of lawsuits due to its strange clauses.

The vacancy of the see of Comminges proved an encouragement for the Spanish bishop of Urgell to further his annexation of the val d'Aran.

Roelker characterises the enthusiasm for revenge exercised by Jeanne in the episode of her Uncle, as tarring her with the brush of religious fanaticism. She ultimately does not conclude that religious fanaticism lay at the root of Jeanne's behaviour here though, but rather personal vindictiveness. She sees a similar brush tarring her own officers such as the seigneur d'Audaux and comte de Gramont on the occasions they ventured to disagree with her.

== Excommunication ==
=== Early warnings ===
On 1 April 1563, the Pope made a condemnation of heretics, irrespective of their social rank.

The historian Sournia suspects that Philip gave encouragement to Pope Pius IV to move against her. The queen mother Catherine for her part saw the inciting efforts of the cardinal de Lorraine.

On 28 September 1563, the Pope issued a monitoire (a Papal summons) demanding the presence of Jeanne within six months. No proxy could be sent to represent her. If she failed to appear before him, she would be excommunicated as a rebel, with her lands forfeit to any Catholic prince who might take them. The prospect of such consequences was a threat out of time. Similar Papal injunctions against the English crown and the Protestant princes of the Holy Roman Empire had accomplished little.

Parallel to this, at the council of Trent, articles were considered that would have declared the queen of Navarre's son, the prince de Béarn, a bastard by virtue of voiding her marriage to the late Antoine de Bourbon. Catherine wrote on this, and the council's attempt to move against princes who tolerated Protestantism, to the seigneur de Saint-Sulpice on 18 October. This plot foundered.

While holding up in the security of her citadel at Navarrenx, Jeanne received word that she had been excommunicated by the Pope, though, only three of the six months allotted for her to appear had passed.

=== Interest of the French crown ===
With the prospect of the queen of Navarre being stripped of her lands hanging over her head, the queen mother Catherine intervened in Rome on the matter. Catherine had little interest in affording the Papacy the right to dispose of the lands of a woman who was a French vassal for much of her territories. Nor did she have interest in providing a casus belli for Philip II to cross the frontier under arms. Charles was similarly put out by the Pope's actions, writing to his Spanish ambassador on 30 November that he would no longer brook Papal interference in or proximate to his territories. Saint-Sulpice was instructed to keep his eyes open to gather the intentions of this party.

The parlements of Bordeaux and Toulouse were far more receptive to the Papal moves than the French crown. They issued decrees stating that as the queen of Navarre was in the process of being excommunicated, her lands were forfeit and returned to the King. Therefore, any anti-Catholic laws she had instituted recently were also illegal. The parlement of Paris ordered the two provincial parlements to annul their decrees immediately. French prelates were warned against cooperating in attacks against the queen of Navarre. Catherine informed the Papacy that it did not enjoy jurisdiction over those wearing crowns, nor was it the Pope's business to dispose of territories as he pleased. The cardinal de Lorraine also intervened on the queen of Navarre's behalf, requesting on 2 November 1563 that the proceedings be suspended so as not to give the French crown an excuse to refuse the implementation of the Tridentine decrees.

=== The Papacy blinks ===
To the pleasure of the Protestants, the threat was not carried out. The queen of Navarre had made concessions in allowing the Mass in her territory, and was coming to court, therefore Charles was satisfied in her conduct. Jeanne was so grateful to Catherine for this defence of her rights, that she elaborated effusively in a letter (perhaps of December) that she placed herself entirely under Catherine's protections, and would far more willingly kiss her feet than those of the Pope.

In December, Catherine dispatched the seigneur de Lanssac to Spain, and the seigneur d'Oisel to Rome to Protestant against the actions taken against the queen of Navarre. The seigneur de Lanssac received assurances from Philip of his goodwill towards the queen of Navarre. He addressed her as 'madame de Vendôme' on account of not recognising her claim to the kingdom of Navarre (Spain occupying the majority of the kingdom), and thus the queen of Navarre refused to respond to his platitudes.

So successful was Catherine's public relations campaign in favour of the queen of Navarre that the Holy Roman Emperor took up her cause against the Pope.

== Spanish plot ==
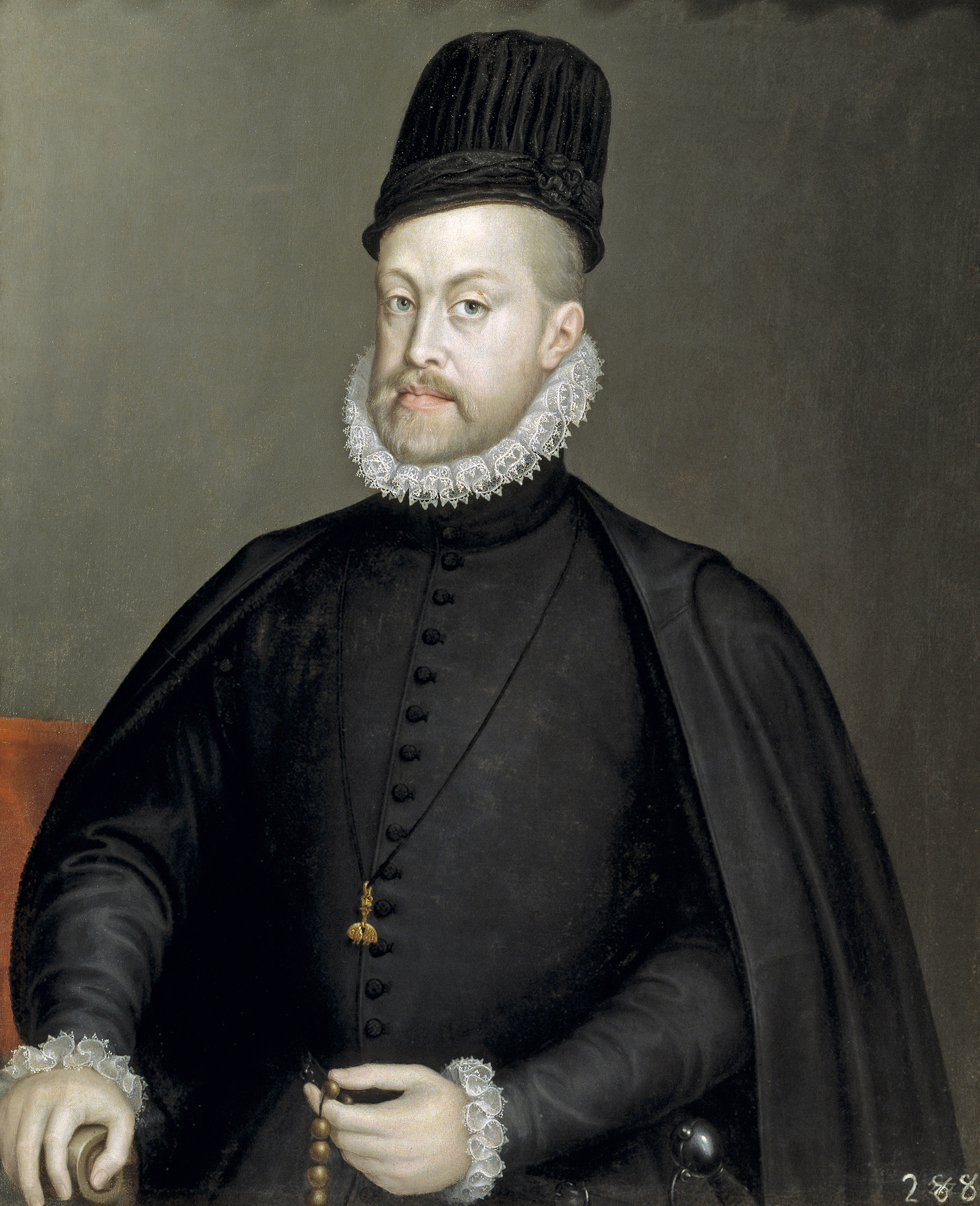
Philip II, king of Spain and leading advocate of plots against the queen of Navarre

The Spanish king Philip II was vexed by the situation in the queen of Navarre's lands. He resented the flow of Protestant literature (some printed in Spanish) over the border, and the spread of Protestantism across the south-west of France, in addition to less religious concerns such as the fortification of frontier towns and the maintenance of soldiers. Indeed, he may have held fears that the queen of Navarre harboured the desire to reconquer the parts of Navarre in Spanish hands. The Spanish King's accusation that the queen of Navarre was distributing Spanish language Protestant literature in Spain was the subject of a memorandum Monluc issued to Catherine during May 1563.

The Spanish viceroy of Navarre, the duke of Alburquerque, threatened to invade lower Navarre if any Protestant ministers entered his viceroyalty. An anonymous report of 16 April 1563 from Bordeaux provided notice of the threat of Spanish garrisons on the Navarrese border. In Monluc's May memorandum, he outlined Alburquerque's threat to lower Navarre, noting it was sanctioned by Philip.

=== Sixteenth-Century accounts ===
The contemporary historian de Thou outlined an elaborate plot devised in 1562 after the death of the king of Navarre. He sourced this plot to information he had received from the secretary of the French ambassador in Spain, and the children of the Spanish queen's chaplain. The queen of Navarre and her children would be kidnapped from Pau, so that they could be tried before the Spanish inquisition. King Philip would assemble an army at Barcelona for his African campaign, but part of it would penetrate the Pyrenees and surprise Pau.

A certain Béarnaise captain named Domingo who had been bribed by the conspirators was dispatched to Guyenne to communicate the plan to reliable grandees of the province before heading on to meet with Philip and the duke of Alba to convince them of the benefits of this plan. According to the seigneur de Monluc, Catholic members of the queen of Navarre's council were party to his plot.

For Philip this supposed plan allowed him to extinguish revanchist plans to reclaim Spanish held Navarre. De Thou saw the duc de Guise as the architect of this conspiracy. According to de Thou's sources, Domingo is to have liaised with the seigneur de Monluc, the baron de Merville (governor of the château de Hâ which guarded Bordeaux) and the vicomte d'Orthe (governor of Bayonne). Domingo explained that they had the queen of Navarre surrounded and she was at their mercy. Monluc is to have declined to participate on grounds the plot was not to his liking.

The death of the duc de Guise did not halt the project, and the agent Domingo was encouraged to leave Guyenne and go to Spain as planned. Domingo thus went to Alba, where the conspiracy was examined in several conferences, before the duke of Alba sent Domingo on to the Spanish sovereign alongside Francès de Álava. Philip was then in Monzón for the cortes (which opened on 18 November 1563).

On route to Monzón, Domingo fell sick. He had to halt his progress at Madrid, where he met with Álava. Álava was to arrange the audience with Philip, but Domingo's fever continued to worsen, and he had to receive a doctor, a certain member of queen Élisabeth's household. Cured by this doctor, Domingo struck up a friendship with the man, but problems arose when Domingo thanked the doctor on behalf of 'those who had sent him'. Learning the names of those who had sent Domingo, the doctor passed the information on to Élisabeth's chaplain, who passed it on to Élisabeth. Alarmed, the Spanish queen wrote in cipher to the French ambassador in Spain, Saint-Sulpice (then in Monzón with Philip). She instructed her chaplain to appraise Saint-Sulpice of the inn in which Domingo was staying. These messengers outraced Domingo to Monzón (the latter arriving in the city on 8 November 1563 according to the chaplain's 15 November letter to Saint-Sulpice). The Ambassador sent men to the inn and learned that in the night Domingo had three times met with Philip. Saint-Sulpice reported that Domingo stayed in Monzón for eight days, meeting with Álava each day, and had also enjoyed several nighttime meetings with Philip and the prince of Éboli. The French Ambassador sent his secretary with letters of credence to the French court, dated 25 November. He was to issue a warning to the queen of Navarre as he passed through Guyenne on route.

Arriving in Bayonne, the secretary wrote to the queen of Navarre. The queen mother Catherine was sceptical of his story, with the secretary lacking a letter of accreditation from Élisabeth. Presenting himself to the constable de Montmorency, and secretary of state L'Aubespine, he found a more sympathetic audience. Montmorency hoped to see Domingo intercepted on his return into France, bearing the letters that would compromise him. Saint-Sulpice reported that Domingo had departed Monzón on 23 November before daybreak, with his route unclear. Having received notice that his arrival was expected, Domingo took another route.

De Thou's account is corroborated by the Villeroy papers. This work, probably written after the 1588 assassination of the duc de Guise/cardinal de Guise. For this author, it was the Lorraine-Guise family which formed the nucleus of the plot. They dispatched Domingo to Spain, with Domingo again mobilising the nobility of Guyenne. Success was found with the seigneur de Monluc, baron de Merville and vicomte d'Orthe. They were to prevent the queen of Navarre's lines of retreat through holding the main towns, impeding an escape across the Garonne. Returning from Spain, Domingo is to have passed through Toulouse, securing the subscription of the cardinal d'Armagnac and the capitouls of the city.

Catherine was pleased by the exposure of this plot, but little desired to see Domingo arrested, for fear he might implicate those she had a use for.

For another contemporary, d'Aubigné, the originator of the plot was to be found with the Jesuits, who had historical ties with the cardinal de Lorraine dating back to 1550. D'Aubigné went as far as to say that the revelation of this Jesuit plot to the Spanish queen Élisabeth by the ambassador Saint-Sulpice contributed to the Queen's death. Brunet finds the timing of this supposed conspiracy to be poorly dated, though granting that the Jesuits would be a strong supporter of the League.

=== Brunet's account ===
Using the letters of Saint-Sulpice, Brunet places the conspiracy at a later date, after the death of the king of Navarre.

As Brunet explains, the nucleus of the conspiracy was to be found as an offshoot of the negotiations that had been conducted with the king of Navarre, which had been entered to assure the Spanish of his return to the Catholic fold, and see likewise done for his wife, and if that proved impossible remove her from the political equation. The king of Navarre was to be offered territorial compensation, much to the vexation of Catherine. After Navarre's death, Philip assured Catherine in January 1563, that there would be no more talk of a territorial reward, via a conversation between the duke of Alba and Saint-Sulpice.

Philip's goal remained the same though, even if the method needed to change. He attempted to propose to Jeanne that she marry either his half-brother John of Austria or his son don Carlos. Through such a marriage, and her return to the Catholic fold, she could receive the return of upper Navarre. The circumstances by which Jeanne suggested she might abandon her religious policy involved the convening of a 'holy council'. A certain Juan Martinez Descurra was entrusted with these negotiations, with his primary point of contacts being two of the Queen's secretaries, and Jeanne allowed them to continue, conscious of her political weakness, though she afforded them no serious consideration. They were conducted in great secrecy, with Roelker suspecting that her advisers were unaware of them.

In February, her uncle Pierre, opined to a Spanish friend (the duke of Villehermosa) that Jeanne would rather lose all her territories and die than convert, and she was raising her son, the prince de Béarn, in this fashion. In April and May these negotiations were put on ice as the queen of Navarre went for some weeks to her retreat of Eaux-Chaudes. Her Protestant religious policy was sufficiently obscured that in June it was reported that she had not 'innovated religiously' and simply allowed Protestants and Catholics both to exist in her territories. In August, Descurra reported on his experiences in Lescar, noting that he had found Catholicism in ruins.

When he again tried to bring up the prospect of marriage, she was evasive, and that it was customary in France for a widowed princess to wait a year before remarriage. In the meantime, she was happy to remain neighbours. Philip annotated the report to note that such a woman was impossible to have as a daughter-in-law and he much preferred to destroy her. Thus, the plan to abduct her, put her before a Papal tribunal, and seize her property was born. Such a plan was unacceptable to the French court, but the cardinal de Lorraine worked on Rome in this direction.

=== French outreach ===
Hoping to restrain Philip, Saint-Sulpice downplayed the tensions in France. This was accomplished through the prince of Éboli who was leant on as a counterweight to the duke of Alba, and to see the Spanish ambassador in France Chantonnay recalled. Concerned for the fate of the queen of Navarre, as well as the prospect of war with Spain, Catherine dispatched the seigneur de Lanssac to Philip to gauge him. She explained this to Saint-Sulpice in a letter of January 1564, noting the talk of war at this time. Lanssac was able to reassure Catherine as to the benevolent attitude of Philip towards the queen of Navarre. Catherine wrote approvingly on this to the comte de Gramont, lieutenant-general of Jeanne's lands in her absence, in February 1564. The Queen Mother also eyed with concern the scale of Spanish war plans, explaining to her ambassador that her fears in this regard were not contrary to the friendship between the two kingdoms. Grateful for Philip's reassurances, the queen of Navarre sent thanks to the Spanish King, as well as a certain Savary de Larboust, the seneschal of Nébouzan. Larboust was to impart the sentiment that although there were religious differences between them, she did not believe that Philip would take advantage of them to cause a break between Christian princes. Each was sovereign in their own realm.

Philip consented to receive Larboust, but not to consider him an ambassador, or to provide a direct answer to Jeanne. To do so would be to recognise her title of queen of Navarre, something prejudicial to his interests. Saint-Sulpice wrote on this to Catherine on 15 April.

=== Incursion ===
In November 1564, Charles protested against a Spanish military intervention in the comté de Foix. Writing to the seigneur de Saint-Sulpice, Charles ordered that those Spanish subjects who had involved themselves in this enterprise by punished as violators of the peace, with prisoners returned. The crown's case that Saint-Sulpice was to make, was that Jeanne's religious inclinations, and her territorial rights were separate matters. For Philip by contrast, a heretic lacked rights in general.

== Monluc's treason ==
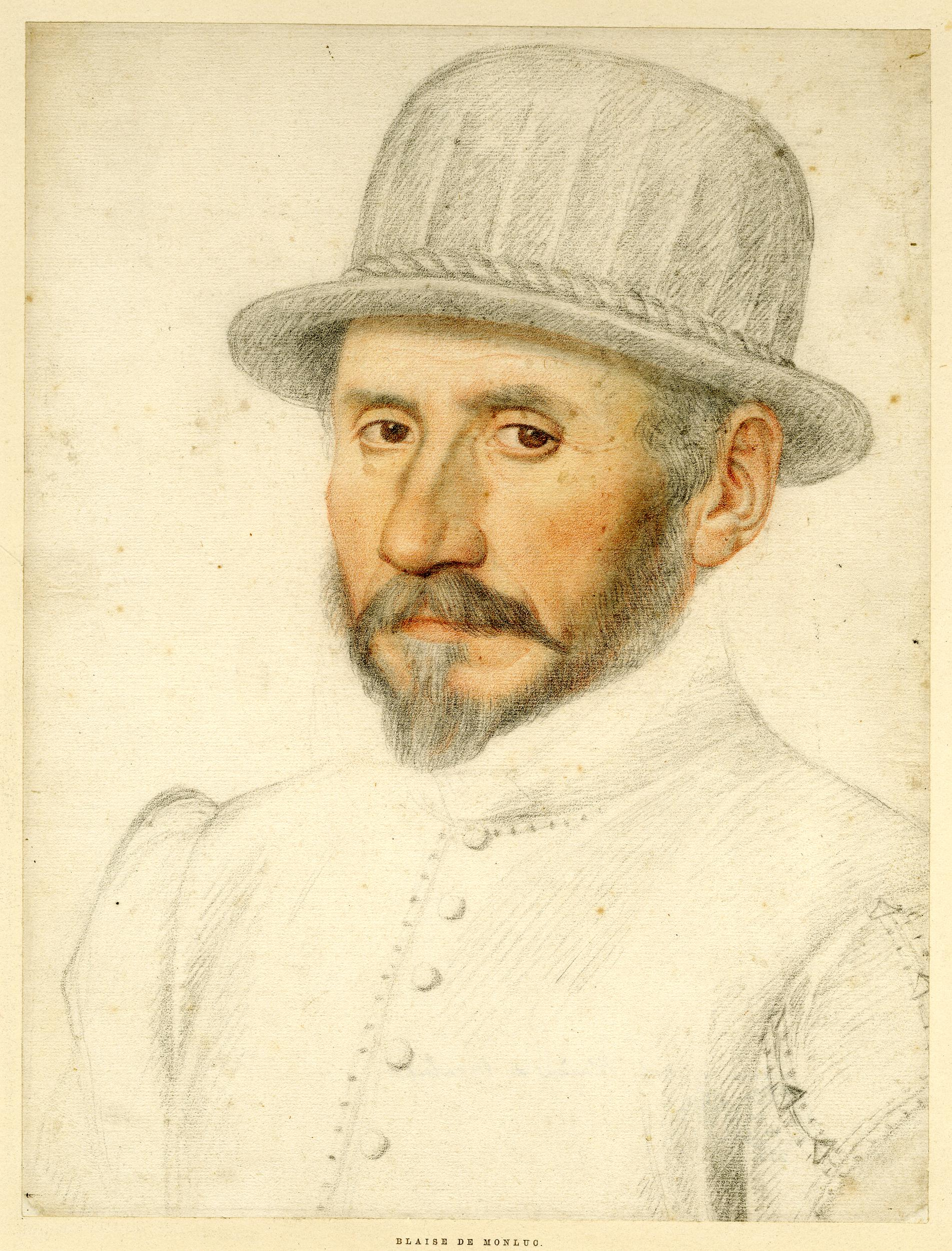
Seigneur de Monluc, lieutenant-general of Guyenne, conspirator with the Spanish against the queen of Navarre

=== Opening of contact ===
The seigneur de Monluc, joint lieutenant-général of Guyenne enjoyed close relations with the Spanish going back to 1562, at which time he had received military support from the Spanish governor of Hondarribia Diego de Carvajal. For the historian Crété, Monluc became a Spanish agent as early as October 1562. In this month, Monluc was indeed writing to Philip, to commend the bravery of the Spanish soldiers in French service during the civil war. Accusations of his dealings with Spain were alleged by contemporaries that year. This time scale is supported by a correspondence with the Spanish favourite Éboli from February 1567 in which it was stated dealings with Monluc stretched back over five years. King Philip backed up this chronology.

Monluc's relations with the queen of Navarre were poor. In his administration of Guyenne, he worked to combat her Protestant proselytising.

It was claimed by his enemies that he had threatened the queen of Navarre that if she continued to support seditions, he might defect to the Spanish camp and seek a Spanish invasion of Béarn, whose nobility would rally to the Spanish sovereign. The prince de Condé claimed he was aware of lines of contact between the seigneur de Monluc, the Spanish viceroy of Aragon and the Spanish governor of Pamplona to the end of facilitating the betrayal of Guyenne to Spain. Around November 1562, Monluc was forced to apologise to Catherine.

In May 1563, he challenged in the parlement of Bordeaux, Jeanne's 24 April declaration by which she asserted her right as high justicar to regulate religious affairs in her duché d'Albret. He challenged her tolerance of Protestantism in Béarn as liable to cause war with Spain. With war against England looming in June 1563, Monluc went too far, asserting that she intended to support an English assault on the south-west of the kingdom. He was compelled to retract this claim with considerable humbleness. He was ordered to proceed with care in how he interacted with her, not providing a cause for offence.

=== The Bardaxí Connection ===
A certain Felipe de Bardaxí, a lord of the border mountains, served as an intermediary between Monluc and the Spanish court. The Bardaxí were border lords, with strong connections across the Pyrenees that made them ideal spies. Brunet notes that the recruitment of the bandits under Bardaxí's command could not have transpired without the approval of the viceroy of Aragon.

The seigneur de Monluc had agreed to appraise Philip on occasion of affairs in France. Philip dispatched Juan de Bardaxí, brother of Felipe, to him no later than December 1563, and Monluc provided Juan with letters and memoires. Felipe de Bardaxí had been put under arrest in Spain at this time as a heretic, his property seized, and an effigy burned in the absence of his person to carry out a death sentence. Through Juan, Monluc plead that Philip grant a pardon to Felipe in February 1564.

After a few months in prison, Felipe was released, paying only a small fine for his 'doctrinal errors'. King Philip well recognising the utility of the Bardaxí as cross-border agents, looked to send Felipe to Monluc in France, the agent arriving by April. In this correspondence with the Spanish, Monluc denounced Catherine and the chancellor L'Hôpital's policy of toleration, Protestant attempts to recruit the young to their religion, and the doings of Jeanne. He begged Philip to intervene militarily and assured him of the support of the Catholic nobility of Languedoc and Guyenne. He further requested, that if necessary, it be possible for him to withdraw into Spain. Philip thanked Monluc for his correspondence, praying that he continued to keep him appraised of developments in France, and also asked him to win over the new governor of Languedoc, the seigneur de Damville. Crété describes Philip's response as 'non-committal'.

At some point in 1563, no later than November, Monluc sent either an oral or written message to Philip. For this purpose, he used the services of Felipe de Bardaxí. All that survives of this correspondence is its mentions in the December letter the French lieutenant-general sent to Philip. Monluc requested Philip's support, as well as asylum in Spain if things went poorly for the French Catholics. Brunet suspects this communique may have been oral, due to the reproachment Monluc had for the agent Felipe. Monluc was frustrated that Philip had responded to a request he had not made, to receive a Spanish sinecure. The old captain was not looking to beg Philip for scraps, but rather provide his services for a Christian cause, as long as it was not directed against Charles.

On 2 December 1563, Monluc requested to be relieved of his charge of lieutenant-general of Guyenne.

=== Monluc advises Philip ===
In an undated letter, Monluc complained to Philip of the influence of Condé and Coligny on the King's council. The men wanted to usurp the crown from Charles' head and would not hesitate to kill the King and other claimants as proved necessary. From this perch, they slung accusations at him (Monluc) as being an agent of the Spanish. Catherine was, in his eyes, caught in the middle, between these suspicions and her fear that the Protestant nobles might recruit German mercenaries and invite them into the kingdom.

It was only through an international Catholic League orientated around the Pope that France could be secured against such endeavours. Philip should take an aggressive tact with queen Elizabeth if she threatened intervention in favour of the French Protestants. Freed of the foreign threats, Charles and Catherine could apply the Tridentine decrees and expel the Protestants from the kingdom. If instead, things continued in their current course, the queen of Navarre would maintain her Protestant proselytism, and she would drive the Kingdom of France in the direction of a military campaign to recover upper Navarre from the Spanish. The Protestants of France would enter into agreement with those of Germany and England, and Spain would quickly be surrounded.

Philip held the greatest responsibility to find a remedy. The assurances of Catherine and her 'awful' chancellor L'Hôpital should not be trusted, as they daily allowed the progress of Protestantism in the kingdom. Decisive and quick action was necessary. If Protestantism gained in France, Monluc would put himself at Philip's service. In dating this letter, Brunet puts it between 2 and 27 December 1563, using the fact that Monluc wrote on the understanding he had resigned from his lieutenant generalcy of Guyenne.

Monluc was concerned about the possibility of his correspondence being compromised. Thus, he stated to Philip his preference to write himself, rather than entrusting his words to the agent Philip was intending to send him. He could not have such a Spanish emissary close to him at a time when suspicions of his behaviour were high. Indeed, Charles would ask him to explain the movements around the border on 12 December, with the carrying of letters and papers over the Spanish frontier.

In his letter of 27 December to Charles, Monluc expressed his scepticism that such dealings could take place without the involvement of any of the great nobles of the region. He assured Charles that they, and he, only dealt with Charles among the princes of Christendom. He rejected the queen of Navarre's besmirchment of the loyalty of the Catholic nobility of Guyenne. The only cross-border dealings related to the procurement of horses and merchant activity.

In his communication with Philip, Monluc complained that if he met with Bardaxí he might be opened up to accusations he wished to betray Charles and the kingdom of France, this would enable Catherine to believe the words of the queen of Navarre against him. Moreover, he would have nothing to say that he wouldn't have included in the letter itself. Despite these concerns, the letter was not enciphered.

Writing on the back of Monluc's letter, Philip instructed that it be translated into Castilian so that Fernando de Toledo and Éboli might be able to read it, and also as there were elements of its text that he didn't understand. Going forward Philip wanted a proper system for correspondence, with encryption and standardised methods. Philip also requested a broader scope of submission of the nobility of Guyenne and Gascony to the Spanish cause.

Having considered himself resigned from the position of lieutenant-general for the majority of December, Monluc retracted his resignation on 27 December at the urgings of Charles and Catherine.

In January 1564, Monluc proposed to Philip a league of Catholic princes against the French crown. Philip was keen to respond to the proposals and information Monluc was offering him. He entrusted Juan de Bardaxí with imparting his wishes to Monluc.

With Felipe de Bardaxí released from his captivity, he was sent to go to Monluc, and report on everything. He arrived by April 1564. Monluc spoke on the release of Felipe de Bardaxí to Juan in a letter of May 1565, claiming the Spanish king's love for him as the cause.

=== Grenade-sur-Garonne affair ===
Around the end of January 1564, a number of Catholic leaders met at Grenade (near Toulouse). Alongside the seigneur de Monluc was the cream of the southern nobility. The governor of Languedoc the seigneur de Damville (son of the constable de Montmorency); the cardinal d'Armagnac (royal lieutenant-general in Languedoc); the seigneur de Montespan (governor of the province of Armagnac); the vicomte d'Orthe (governor of Bayonne); the comte de Luxe (former président of the Estates of Navarre, the governor of the château de Mauléon and the lieutenant-general of the province of Soule); the seigneur de Mirepoix; the baron de Terride (Monluc's lieutenant); and the seigneur de Nègrepelisse (another lieutenant of the seigneur de Monluc for the jugerie of Rivière-Verdun). Here, they met with the renegade bishop of Comminges, on his return from the Spanish court where he had asked Philip to intervene on his behalf in his dispute with his niece, the queen of Navarre. Brunet speculates that the bishop might have been given a commission by the Spanish king to discuss matters with this group, and ultimately concludes he was likely carrying a message for the men.

In determining the true nature of the Grenade meeting, Brunet looks to Juan de Bardaxí, whom Philip had dispatched to Monluc. Juan was due to meet with Monluc in Toulouse, but the jumpy Frenchman departed from the city under a pretext, likely ill desiring the compromising prospect of a meeting with this Spanish agent. Brunet suggests that it was in Monluc's absence from Toulouse that the Grenade conference transpired.

==== Monluc's report ====
Returning to Toulouse, Monluc conferred with Juan, likely imparting information concerning the recent Grenade meeting. Bardaxí then returned to Philip, bringing with him a letter from Monluc dated 8 February as a representative of the 'Catholics of Guyenne'. This was to claim a broader mantle than just the nobles of the province, including the wider people. Monluc bid Philip believe what was verbally communicated to him. This oral transmission was more explosive than the contents of his December letters. Much of the ground covered in his December 1563 letter was again traced, but in more detail. It would not be Monluc leaving France to enter Spanish service now, but rather the Catholic nobility of Guyenne, Gascony and Languedoc leading the defence of their territories against Protestantism with Philip's support. The queen of Navarre was elevated as a target.

If Philip did not provide succour, the seigneur de Monluc believed the French king would be Protestant within the year. By his intervention he might see Charles make war against the queen of Navarre. Philip was to see Charles assign Monluc to bring the queen of Navarre to justice. If she did not abandon her laws within six months, she would be executed for the crime of bringing France into ruin. He raised the prospect of a Spanish inheritance of the French throne in the absence of the King's brothers, through queen Élisabeth. Bardaxí reported further that Monluc desired to travel through the Spanish kingdoms and serve Philip in Italy.

The cardinal de Lorraine echoed the possibility of a Spanish inheritance of the French throne, as well as offering the surrender of border fortresses in the eventuality that the Protestants kidnapped Charles and Catherine.

Concerning the Tridentine decrees, Monluc hoped that Philip would intervene with Catherine and Charles to see their observing, and that arms be taken up against those who failed to abide by them. Monluc derided the French ambassador in Spain Saint-Sulpice as a heretic, noting that any French representative in the Spanish court would assuredly be one.

Monluc and his likeminded associates would conduct negotiations with the seigneur de Damville. These sentiments were imparted to Philip while he was in Barcelona.

Factoring in the 1563 conspiracy reported by de Thou and the Villars papers, Brunet sees the Grenade meeting as a part of this process. Those who attended were not only malcontents with Catherine, but actual conspirators. The bishop of Comminges might have borne a message from Philip about a Spanish intervention into Béarn, with Domingo serving as a liaison between Monluc and the illegitimate son of the duke of Alba, Hernando de Toledo. Thus, Jeanne's anger was well justified, a plot against her life, and those of her children did exist.

Writing to the constable de Montmorency from Pau on 15 February, the queen of Navarre complained that Monluc menaced the perimeter her lands such that she feared he might invade, leading an assault against one of her residences.

On 23 February, Philip gave his response to Monluc, orally, as had been Monluc's address to him, through the medium of Juan de Bardaxí. He indicated a desire to see the seigneur de Damville brought into the fold of these discussions. With Damville, both the government of Guyenne and Languedoc would be on side. He gave encouragement to Monluc and those others around them, with assurances they could enjoy asylum in Spain should things fall apart.

Monluc was not successful in bringing the governor of Languedoc, the seigneur de Damville, into the fold.

==== Conspiracy leaks ====
Unfortunately for Monluc, the meeting at Grenade did not remain a secret. As early as 26 February, a stranger appeared in Paris claiming to be a chamberlain of the seigneur de Monluc. He implored the new Spanish ambassador to France, Álava, to write to Philip in haste, or the enterprise would be uncovered. Álava sensed a trap and dismissed the man. He noted in his letter of 28 February to Philip that two men of the Lorraine-Guise affinity had accused Monluc of planning to hand over Guyenne to the Spanish sovereign.

A perhaps intoxicated, seigneur de La Gravière (the seneschal of Quercy), after a dinner at Estillac confided some of Monluc's remarks to the seigneur de Marchastel. Marchastel entrusted a certain Pierre de Rapin, of a Protestant family, with bringing news to the French court that Monluc intended to betray control of Guyenne to the king of Spain. Six articles were to be delivered, countersigned by the queen of Navarre, and the leading Protestant dignitaries of the south-west.

Rapin allowed himself to be made a prisoner at court, so that his accusations might be validated. After briefly being put on trial for slander by the King for his accusation, he was shortly released with the trial not having come to pass.

This episode was leapt upon by the queen of Navarre and her court. In their estimation, the meeting at Grenade had seen the participants form a league for the betrayal of Guyenne to Philip, endorse and apply the Tridentine decrees, that Monluc's second son was in Spain as part of these dealings, and that Monluc had entrusted La Gravière with assaulting the city of Montauban.

==== Conspirators push back ====
The renegade bishop of Comminges dismissed the queen of Navarre's allegations in a letter to Philip, describing them as the brainchild of her 'apostate' advisors.

La Gravière was summoned to court, but he denied the statements attributed to him. Monluc's reputation was muddied by the queen of Navarre's accusation. The lieutenant-general was on the cusp of resigning from his charge, something that he mentioned in his 5 March correspondence with Bardaxí. The Spanish ambassador reported that he was to be recalled to court, with the maréchal de Bourdillon dispatched to take over the lieutenant-generalcy of Guyenne in his place. Álava further specified in his letters of 7 and 15 March that word had it Monluc was going to retire from France, request a bishopric from the Pope, who would reward him with the office of cardinal upon his arrival in Rome. Yet Catherine did not desire a diplomatic incident and was keen to smooth over the affair.

In his declaration from Agen of 5 March, Monluc defended himself by claiming that the meeting at Grenade was in fact for the funeral of his nephew, the baron de Clermont. The cardinal d'Armagnac was in Grenade on his way to the wedding of the seigneur de Mirepoix to the daughter of the baron de Terride, Catherine-Ursule de Lomagne. Monluc argued contrary to his accusers that he had expressed nothing to Philip that he had not expressed to Catherine. If he had discussed the queen of Navarre, it was only to note his disapproval of her anti-Catholic policies. If he had discussed the council of Trent, it was to dismiss its adoption in France, not mandate it. While he desired to raze the walls of the various Protestant strongholds, such as Montauban, he did not desire to see the places themselves destroyed. There was also the matter of his son, Jean de Monluc, he had not embarked at Narbonne to enter Spanish service, but rather to travel to Rome and Malta. He ended his defence by requesting that notice of his desire to duel his accuser be posted at the court.

The others present likewise defended themselves. Armagnac implored Catherine not to place stock in those who made such smears against 'honest servants of the crown'.

While these justifications could explain the presence in Grenade of Monluc, Armagnac, Terride and Mirepoix, it could not explain the presence of all the men. Particularly problematic was the visit of the bishop of Comminges, who had no cause to be there. Monluc stated in his defence, that the cardinal d'Armagnac had reproached the bishop of Comminges for seeking support from the Spanish king. He counselled instead that the bishop of Comminges make his appeal to his sovereign. Pierre had not followed this advice, making instead for his bishopric of Comminges, with Monluc not knowing any more than this.

Along with the cardinal d'Armagnac, the baron de Terride, and the seigneurs de Mirepoix and Nègrepelisse, Monluc wrote to Catherine on 15 May requesting exemplary reparations, but Catherine did not grant this.

Damville issued a separate protest from Avignon, writing directly to Catherine on 30 May. He argued that he was not in the region at the time of the Grenade meeting, he also noted that Chantonnay had arrived in Avignon. Gould finds Damville's objections strange, noting that he was in the area at the time for regional inspections. He observes too that Damville made no attempts to clear the wider Catholic nobility of Guyenne from involvement, questioning whether this might represent a step in Damville distancing himself from his militant Catholic compatriots in the south-west. As for the information about Chantonnay, Gould speculates that this might have been an olive branch of loyalty by betraying information about a figure who was a middleman between Monluc and Madrid.

==== Court involvement ====
The parlements of Bordeaux and Toulouse intervened on behalf of the Catholic nobility in this affair, challenging Jeanne's testimony. The queen of Navarre complained to the conseil privé that it was not appropriate for provincial parlements to proffer challenge to her evidence. The crown resolved to send commissioners to mediate, but before they could get far from Paris, further remonstrances from the Catholic leadership reiterated their outrage at having their loyalty impugned by heretics. A meeting of Catholic nobles at the abbey of Belleperche threatened litigation in response to the 'libels and slander'. Parlementaires such as Daffis made it clear that an attack on the Catholic nobility would be taken as an attack against their members. The matter was also pulled into the dispute between the moderate premier président of the Bordeaux parlement and his opponents, with his rivals trying to see the queen of Navarre's 'falsehoods' condemned only for the premier président to block them from receiving a hearing before the grand'chambre. The crown was put out by this and reevaluated its position. Rather than arbitrate the quarrel, it would remain neutral and allow the affair to run its course.

==== Monluc's guilt ====
In assessing his guilt, Monluc's biographer, Sournia characterises Monluc as more guilty of naïveté than subterfuge. He further argues out Monluc had no ability to parcel out lands, and no strategic plans for an invasion are featured in the correspondence. Ultimately he summarises Monluc's Spanish relationship as a correspondence of no consequence. Gould follows Sournia, Monluc was subject to 'accusations', and the crown was not willing to lose his valuable services for maintaining order in the south-west. By contrast to Monluc's correspondences, which were ultimately of 'no consequence', Condé and Coligny had handed over a port city (Le Havre) to a foreign sovereign. Brunet, a specialist in this area, concludes that, contrary to the Navarrese claims, it was unlikely that the plan was to hand Guyenne over to the Spanish sovereign. Nevertheless, this was not a simple happenstance meeting, but rather a conference of those dissatisfied with Catherine's government. He cites the behaviour of these men after the conference as evidence. He notes that the accusations against Monluc's son Jean were premature, he was indeed making for Malta and would not serve as a Spanish spy until 1576. The lieutenant-general had to studious avoid mentioning his favourite son, the seigneur de Caupène (sometimes called Peyrot), who was at this time seeking Spanish service.

The failure of Philip to intervene on behalf of the conspiracy is a matter Brunet considers. He posits that it might have derived from the failure of the Pope to excommunicate Jeanne and sequester her lands. He notes that this eventuality was a dim prospect given the increasingly fractious relations between Philip and Pius IV.

=== Continued relationship with Spain ===
Going forward after the Grenade affair, Monluc would continue his Spanish correspondence, but more carefully than before, dissimulating in the same fashion he would one day do in his memoires.

Monluc enjoyed his own network of informants, with representatives on the Flanders border/around Bayonne and Toulouse. By this means, he might offer information to Philip. The Bardaxí continued to serve as his intermediaries, in addition to the new Spanish ambassador Álava. A further boon to this was the development around this time of a more robust and secure Spanish information network in the south-west of the kingdom.

In September 1564, the Spanish king liaised with Monluc through Bardaxí concerning organising his supporters in France under the seigneur de Monluc's authority. This letter to Juan, of 26 September, sought to gauge the forces at their disposal, to understand the season in which they wished to operate, and the route Philip's forces should take. Juan was to be careful to make sure that it was not seen as being a matter undertaken on religious grounds, as this would bind the German Protestants to their French compatriots and be of such power as to be hard to oppose. If those Bardaxí was collaborating with were compelled to withdraw from France, they could be assured of a reception befitting their dignity from Philip.

Writing to Catherine and the cardinal de Lorraine in August and October 1564, Monluc essayed his opinion that the edict of Amboise should be revoked.

=== Dire warnings on France ===
In a letter of 27 October 1564, Monluc bid Bardaxí not be frustrated by the fact they had not seen one another, as the queen of Navarre was continually complaining of his treacherous dealings. She had no evidence of this, and indeed, knew the opposite to be true, but nevertheless, Monluc did not wish to be a suspect. He bid Juan to see that Fernando de Toledo not send Domingo to him anymore, as he would surely be interpreted as a spy even if he was a good man. As to the state of France, he saw the Protestants as constituting the majority in all provinces of France other than Burgundy, Languedoc, and Provence. Languedoc had been remedied through the arrival of the seigneur de Damville but even he had only ten units of infantry and 600-700 men-at-arms. In Guyenne, Monluc noted that the nobility held all the land, but that nevertheless, people were always converting to Protestantism.

Confiding in Juan de Bardaxí in 1566, Monluc noted that he had despaired at trying to provide warnings to Catherine and Charles. He remained wedded to the idea of an international Catholic League, fearing that if it were not done, Catholicism would be history within two years. Monluc continued to appraise Philip of events in France and Flanders, being sure to avoid direct couriers, communicating through Bardaxí.

Monluc would, as needs be, command partisans in Guyenne on Philip's behalf.

=== New impetus ===
During the crisis in the Spanish Netherlands that began in 1566, Monluc informed the Spanish sovereign that if he entered France, the Protestants intended to attack him. He thus counselled Philip to not pass through France on route. Philip maintained the position that he had long voiced, that of general support for Catholic resistance in the south-west of France. In such a case as the Protestants took arms, Philip gave his support to an armed rising of the Catholics of Guyenne.

With the southern Catholics once more interested in conspiracy in June 1566, Felipe de Bardaxí gave his opinion to Philip that while they were ready to serve him and Catholicism, they remembered the broken promises of 1564. Bardaxí noted by contrast the relative coldness of the seigneur de Monluc.

In September, Philip sent Juan de Bardaxí to Monluc with a series of recommendations. The seigneur de Monluc was given assurance both to the good favour in which he was held in Spain and the interest taken in the information he provided to Spain, these despatches were therefore to be continued. Philip considered that the Catholics of Guyenne were ready to assume arms in defence of their religion. He commended those of Bordeaux and Toulouse for remaining impervious to Monluc's brother, the bishop of Valence's, tolerant discourses. Philip advised Monluc to continue expanding the circle of allies he possessed loyal to his cause.

The seigneur de Monluc, alongside the seigneur de Bellegarde, petitioned Philip (as in a letter of 6 February 1567) to give pardon to Felipe de Bardaxí. Juan gave assurances to the Inquisition that Felipe would return within six months. Philip assented to this request, seeing it as important for maintaining his relationship with Monluc.

It was with delight that Philip observed in letter to Juan of 13 February the concordance of the information about the Protestant plans relating to the Spanish Netherlands with the information he received from Álava, and his other informants.

Philip imagined an uprising of the Catholics of Guyenne. To this end, Juan and Felipe would require proper financing. Juan kept both Philip and the duke of Alba well informed. It was important to appraise Alba, who was about to be marching north to the Spanish Netherlands, of the Protestant plans. This stream of information was not terminated by the duke of Alba's arrival in Flanders.

The Spanish king was curious to learn the intentions of the French Protestants but received only vague answers from the Bardaxí brothers during March and April 1567.

== Violent resistance to the queen of Navarre's religious policy ==
=== 1563 stripping of the churches ===
In response to the July 1563 order to strip Catholic churches, armed members of the Catholic clergy in Navarrenx, Pau, Monein, and Nay, attempted to fight back. At Lescar, anger was directed against the bishop Louis d'Albret, who Gould describes as a Protestant. The administration in Pau ordered that two-thousand soldiers be deployed to facilitate the removal of the Catholic paraphernalia. This caused the situation to devolve into riots and battles.

In December, the Protestant officials returned to Oloron to oversee the removal of statues from the cathedral of Sainte-Marie. This was to the great vexation of the Catholics, who, with the suppression of the Estates, no longer had an alternative outlet to express their displeasure. Led by a senior canon of the cathedral, dissidents threw up barricades to stop the Queen's men entering the cathedral grounds. This rebellion soon found assistance from the comte de Luxe, who lead Catholic resistance in lower-Navarre. He rallied soldiers to support their coreligionists in Oloron. Affronted by this surprising rebellion (Oloron having been an early Protestant hotbed in Béarn dating back to the 1550s), Jeanne led the military counterstroke. With the rebels not yet having fully assembled, she was able to see Oloron quickly recaptured. Though victorious, the experience nevertheless forced a re-evaluation from Jeanne.

=== Gramont's arrival, retreat from anti-Catholicism ===
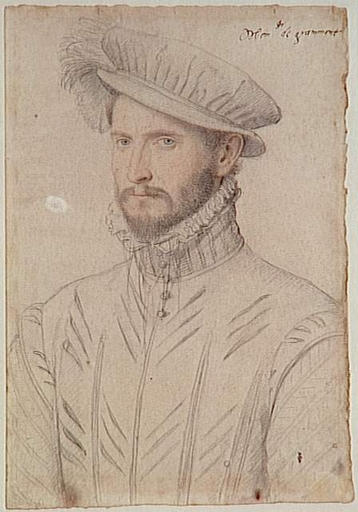
Comte de Gramont, governor of Béarn for the queen of Navarre

Hoping to overcome opposition to her rule in Béarn, Jeanne requested the dispatch of the comte de Gramont, a man in whom she had complete confidence, from the French court to her. Needing to convince Catherine of her cooperative spirit, she wrote to the constable de Montmorency to emphasise the urgency of receiving Gramont, as her lands were subject to the machinations of Monluc (who attempted to seize her property at Nérac, Mont-de-Marsan and other places). Gramont was duly dispatched, bearing a letter from Catherine which noted that the queen of Navarre would be most prudent to follow royal policy, permitting freedom of conscience for all.

Gramont arrived in January 1564. With Gramont likely bearing royal orders, and facing the Estates of Béarn, Jeanne permitted freedom of religious conscience on 2 February of that year. This did not include places where Catholicism had already been suppressed, and the door was left open to the further expansion of Protestant worship. Movable church wealth was to be liquidated and used for poor relief. Her simultaneum to that effect was compromised by its requirement that Catholics and Protestants share churches and burial grounds, a prospect unacceptable to practitioners of both faiths. Crimes committed under the pretext of religion were pardoned unless they involved lèse majesté (a crime against the sovereign).

Such concessions to the Catholics were a temporary measure for Jeanne, before the reformed faith could progress again at a more favourable time. These measures soothed passions. The queen of Navarre then received summons to come to the French court and left the comte de Gramont in Béarn with the powers of lieutenancy.

=== Civil wars in the lands of the queen of Navarre ===
During May 1566, Jeanne established an ordinance by which Calvinism was declared to be the only permissible religion in her lands of Béarn and Navarre. This revoked a bi-confessional tolerance established in 1564. The clergy of Béarn reacted with frustration, refusing to publish the patent. These frustrations were compounded when in June the synod of Nay voted to begin the suppression of idolatry again, and institute a Puritanical moral code. installed a Basque speaking minister in Saint-Palais (in French Navarre), a cause of concern in Spain that Protestantism might be spread into upper (Spanish) Navarre. The Catholics of Nérac, in Jeanne's territory of Albret, complained in 1566 that they were obstructed from engaging in their worship.

Jeanne's religious policies, combined with her tax policies, aroused resentment in her lands. There were protests against it to be found in Limoges, Pau, Foix and Pamiers. These frustrations escalated into armed insurrections. Foix descended into a state of civil war. In Pamiers, one-hundred-and-twenty Catholics were killed in June 1566. The comte de Gramont warned the queen of Navarre concerning the extremity of her policies, but she ignored his objections.

By March 1567, the comte de Gramont had suspended the application of the ordinance in Béarn pending the return of the queen of Navarre. According to the information in the possession of the Spanish agent Guevara, the queen of Navarre was then in Vendôme and planned to return to the Basque country (where Gramont was) via Nérac, where she would spend all of April. The queen of Navarre would pass through Nérac on her way south to Béarn, meeting with Monluc during her stay there.

In a surprising step, that Brunet sees as a reflection of her weakness, the queen of Navarre met with her arch-nemesis the seigneur de Monluc in Marmande. Neither Jeanne nor Monluc were interested in recording this meeting, and information on it comes down to us through the Bardaxí brothers, Felipe possibly having been present for the occasion. Jeanne perhaps attempted to secure the defection of Monluc. Guevara, the spy of the viceroy of Navarre reported that Monluc was unmoved by her intervention in his letter of 31 March. In writing to the prince of Éboli on 3 April, Juan de Bardaxí derided Jeanne as a 'bitch' for her attempt to secure Monluc's loyalty. Éboli maintained his confidence in the seigneur de Monluc in his report, but there were now doubts in Philip's council concerning the Lieutenant-General. For example, Álava derided him, by letter of 18 April, as having exposed himself as an 'atheist', becoming close friends with the queen of Navarre and comte de Gramont.

By 5 April, the queen of Navarre and the prince de Béarn could be found in Pau. With them were Protestant nobles of Albret, Bigorre and Béarn. Among these were the seigneur de Duras and most prominently the seigneur d'Audaux. This group would celebrate the Last Supper with Jeanne.

Brunet places the reassertion of Jeanne's policy of unitary Protestantism upon her return to Béarn, as opposed to other historians that have seen the swinging point as falling in 1568. The Catholics in control of church revenues were inflamed in fears by this, sowing the seeds for revolt and war.

The queen of Navarre visited Navarrenx, providing weapons for the town, doing similarly in Mauléon. Brunet reports that there were supposedly 4,000 pikes in her territory. She dispatched a certain captain Artieda as a spy to Irissarry. The resistance shown by her Basque and Navarrese subjects to her religious policy contrasted with that of her Béarnais subjects, even though there was resistance in the latter place also. Jeanne ordered Gramont to see a pastor installed in every Parish of lower Navarre, and to outlaw Mass, as was her policy in Béarn. Gramont refused to obey this order.

==== Easter clash ====
As Easter approached, Jeanne prohibited the bishop of Oloron from celebrating Mass in the church of Sainte-Marie. The Bishop made for Mauléon, where Jeanne could not presently prohibit Catholic worship. Guevara complained that even here, the most prominent individuals were Protestants.

On the second day of Easter, a dispute between Protestants and Catholics arose in Pau, before the queen of Navarre and prince de Béarn. Guevara reported that in the royal gardens, the seigneur de Saint-Colomme and his brother entered dispute with the Protestant pastor Merlin who was conversing with Jeanne. The seigneur d'Audaux rose up in Merlin's defence and joined the argument. Words became blows, and according to Guevara the violence that followed left fifty Protestants dead, and up to six Catholics. Saint-Colomme suffered wounds.

After this violent episode, the queen of Navarre retired sick to her room, Guevara speculated her sickness was one of grief. The Spanish spy noted that he had appraised the comte de Gramont, Saint-Colomme meanwhile appraised his cousin, the seigneur de Monluc. Brunet notes that Guevara might be mistaken about the presence of Merlin in this violent episode. He cites the fact that Merlin is not recorded in the subsequent synod in Pau of 10 April. He puts forward the possibility that the pastor was injured in the violence and notes how close the queen of Navarre kept him.

==== Break between Gramont and Jeanne ====
The growing hostility between the comte de Gramont and the queen of Navarre, and Gramont's rapprochement with Monluc, was seen as a trick by the Spanish. It was simply a smokescreen for Protestant war preparations, and further evidence of how compromised Monluc had become. Frustrated by Jeanne's policy of iconoclasm, Gramont handed in his charge of lieutenant-general of Béarn, telling the queen of Navarre he would abandon her service if she did not alter her course. He then retired to his estates.

By February 1567, a conspiracy had been organised by which the baron de Gerderest would lead an uprising to suppress Calvinism in Béarn (including the expulsion of all ministers), kidnap the queen of Navarre and her children, and expel all the non-Béarnais from the territory of the vicomté. This had the support of the Spanish, as well as the canons of Lescar and Oloron, and various Catholic nobles. According to Bordenave, the conspiracy would be unleashed on Pentecost, with the opening shots involving the massacre of Protestants gathered at their temple in Oloron for the Last Supper. Supporting the baron de Gerderest were the seigneur de Peyre, governor of Pau; the baron de Monein (a member of the sovereign council); the seigneur de Escoarrabaque; the sieur de Bonasse, the sieur de Gohas, the sieur d'Armendaritz; in addition to various lawyers and canons.

Jeanne, resolved to retire to the spa town of Eaux-Chaudes on 30 April. It was her intention to stay here through May and upon her return seeing to the convening of the Estates of Béarn, then those of Foix, Bigorre and Albret. Around the start of August, she would convene those of lower-Navarre. So at least, wrote the spy Guevara to the duke of Medinacelli on 25 April. Brunet describes the moment as being ideal for a revolt, but that the conspirators were betrayed by a Catholic, a certain sieur de Munein. Jeanne was thus alerted to the plot by the seigneur d'Audaux, while on route to Eaux-Chaudes, and reacted quickly. Jeanne tasked Audaux with leading the suppression of the revolt. Brunet notes that his job was not easy.

In lower-Navarre, Audaux had to contend with a certain Catholic vicomte de Macaye, the brother-in-law of the comte de Luxe.

==== Oloron uprising ====
Only a little while later, a new conspiracy against Jeanne emerged, this one from the convent of Oloron. Jeanne dispatched soldiers and judicial officials to examine the affair.

Guevara reported that the queen of Navarre returned from the Eaux-Chaudes on 19 May. A truce had been established between the Protestants and Catholics of Oloron, and this was respected. The seigneur d'Audaux and a certain captain Burel controlled the centre of the city for the Protestants. Meanwhile, the seigneur d'Esgarrebaque, who was governor of Oloron, and seigneur de Monein held the suburbs to the Sainte-Marie bridge for the Catholics. The latter was Basque, which indicates for Brunet a connection between the Basque and Béarnais uprisings. Esgarrebaque, Monein and a third figure that Brunet identifies as Peyre swore an oath that they would die before they allowed their churches to be destroyed.

Belsunce, the governor of Soulé, who had been staying in the château de Mauléon, came to his city and rounded up the leading Protestants.

Jeanne ordered her captains make ready for war. On 23 May, the comte de Gramont mustered his cavalry a few leagues away from Toulouse. Any Catholic who wished to enter Navarrenx had to dispose of their weapons first, even if the weapon was only a knife.

Brunet argues that by this means, the queen of Navarre suffocated another conspiracy, by which Felipe de Bardaxí had bribed residents of Navarrenx who would probably have seized the château of Navarrenx by betrayal. This conspiracy was to transpire on Jeanne's return to the baths. Juan de Bardaxí reported on this to the prince of Éboli on 1 September. Brunet speculates as to whether the plot was simply the seizure of Navarrenx or if it was another one that involved the kidnap of the Queen and her Son.

On 27 May, Guevara reported to Philip a rumour he had heard from a Protestant of Béarn by which after the conclusion of the truce in Béarn, the Protestants would look to gain victory, and if successful, they would invade upper (Spanish) Navarre.

In sum, the plots of eary-1567 were suppressed without bloodshed.

Much later than originally planned, the queen of Navarre convened the Estates of Béarn in July and August. There was much discord in the sessions. In particular, her ordinance of 1566 was challenged by the bishops of Oloron and Lescar. 42 members of the First and Second Estate voted in favour of their maintenance to 49 for their withdrawal. The situation was even worse in the Third Estate, where only the deputies of Pau and its surrounds supported Jeanne. Irrespective of this, the queen of Navarre was further resolved to see Catholicism purged from Béarn, and committed to ignore their opposition to the ordinance. She justified this on the grounds of her duty to god and the Protestant faith. Bordenave noted that if conceding to her subjects had not been a violation of god's will, she would have done it, but in the circumstances she felt no alternative. Her suppression of the rebellions was also challenged on the grounds of its illegality. Jeanne refused to back down.

According to Guevara this rebellion was pacified by September. The leaders of the Oloron uprising were pardoned, the sentences of execution they were subject to cancelled, with the leaders allowed to maintain their offices and property.

==== Lower-Navarre rebellion ====
The queen of Navarre's increasing firmness on religious policy would lead to rebellion in lower Navarre. While their conspiracy in Béarn had been frustrated, Catholic notables held a stronger position in lower-Navarre. Under the command of the comte de Luxe, several Navarrais gentlemen (the seigneurs de Monein, Espelette, Etchaux and Garro) entered revolt against Jeanne in September. Some Protestants, worried about their privileges and rights, participated in the conspiracy.

At Saint-Palais, a Catholic League was formed in September 1567. Jeanne dispatched her attorney general and some officers of her household to reassure the Basques. As a show of her goodwill, she sent a Basque gentleman as her representative to administer justice in the territory. The comte de Luxe kidnapped this figure. This revolt enjoyed the covert support of the queen mother Catherine. Indeed, she awarded the comte de Luxe the collar of the order of Saint-Michel. Jeanne dispatched a certain captain Lalane (the maître de camp of Jeanne's infantry) to bring Saint-Palais back into line with her directives. Lalane's mission was a failure, with the representative being imprisoned by the rebels at the château de Garris.

The seigneur d'Audaux, who had been a key supporter of the queen of Navarre, defected to the rebel cause. So too, the bishop of Oloron, who had supported her religious policy. Gould finds their reasons for defection obscure but notes that resecuring their loyalty was an immediate priority for the queen of Navarre. In November, the procureur-général of Béarn, Jean d'Etchart, was entrusted with heading to Oloron to coax Audaux back to court. His mission was a failure. Attempts to separate Luxe and Domezain from the leaguers with a feigned assault into lower-Navarre similarly proved a failure, with Luxe having established cross-social paramilitary groups to guard his homeland.

==== National civil war ====
Domezain was entrusted with making for Agen, to meet with the seigneur de Monluc so that he might request reinforcements. Similar outreach was to be undertaken at Madrid. Escoarrabaque meanwhile went to Paris to attain endorsement for the league of Oloron.

Navailles looked to bring about the defection of the bishop of Lescar to the rebel cause, by sending forth a letter on 15 January describing Catholic victories at the hands of the duc d'Anjou.

Frustrated by this open defiance, in February 1568 the queen sent out her son, the prince de Béarn. With the young Béarn for this mission into Navarre was the comte de Gramont. These two men were at the head of a troop.

Jeanne also wrote to the parlement of Bordeaux in February, complaining of Monluc's interference, which compromised her ability to defend her own territories. Monluc shot back that the queen of Navarre was acting illegally by massing troops in Foix and Albret, only he had authority to levy soldiers in these places. The premier président (most senior judge) of the Bordeaux parlement Roffignac, supported Monluc, and dismissed the queen of Navarre's objections. The French crown by contrast, more concerned by Spanish build up than by the queen of Navarre, rebuked Roffignac for meddling.

In early March, the vicomte de Macaye betrayed the Catholic rebel cause. He alerted one of Jeanne's spies that the force assembled at Oloron planned to march on Pau within the week. In nearby Ossau, the Catholic baron d'Audaux, who maintained loyalty to Jeanne, rallied her forces to cut off the rebel's route. The rebels were by this means encircled.

With the loyalists arriving in the area, the rebels fled in the direction of Valcarlos. The prince de Béarn pursued them beyond Saint-Jean-Pied-de-Port. He then returned to Pau where he had the procureur-général (attorney general) de Béarn, a certain Jean d'Etchard, harangue the population in Basque. In this harangue, the people of Navarre were assured that their privileges and rights would be respected, and they would not be compelled into Protestantism. Pleased by this harangue, the prince de Béarn was acclaimed by the crowd.

Despite her victory in lower-Navarre, Jeanne made concessions to the rebels, unwilling to repudiate the promises her son had made. In areas where the Catholics enjoyed a majority they could have public worship. Catholic nobles who had historically enjoyed a patronage of benefices could continue to distribute them. Both Catholics and Protestants could administer education for children, but Catholic teachers had to be vetted by the Protestant sovereign council. No longer would households be obliged to accommodate itinerant Protestant ministers. By this means, Navarre became the exception in the queen of Navarre's territorial framework.

The rebels reproached the comte de Gramont for what they felt to be his betrayal of their cause for that of the queen of Navarre. He had in theory converted to Catholicism and abandoned the queen of Navarre. To counteract this, the queen of Navarre had granted an advantageous marriage for the comte de Gramont's son, the comte de Guiche to Diane d'Andoins (later known as Corisande, the most eligible bride in Béarn), who enjoyed incomes of 25,000 écus. Álava explained the loyalism of the Catholic comte de Gramont on the grounds of the enmity he enjoyed with the comte de Luxe.

Coming south first in February 1568, Catherine's representative, the seigneur de La Mothe-Fénelon would intervene with Jeanne to see that the noble conspirators received pardons. The leadership: Luxe, Audaux, Domezain, Saint-Colomme and others, were inducted into the order of Navarre, in return for agreeing to respect the queen of Navarre's authority. This frustrated Protestant commentators, who viewed the act as a buying off of the traitors. The representative proposed that Jeanne withdraw some of her anti-Catholic measures. He also urged Jeanne and her children to come to the French court.

== Sources ==
- Babelon, Jean-Pierre (2009). Henri IV. Fayard.
- Baumgartner, Frederic (1986). Change and Continuity in the French Episcopate: The Bishops and the Wars of Religion 1547-1610.
- Boucher, Jacqueline (1998). "Monluc". In Jouanna, Arlette; Boucher, Jacqueline; Biloghi, Dominique; Le Thiec, Guy (eds.). Histoire et Dictionnaire des Guerres de Religion.
- Brunet, Serge (2001). "Anatomie des réseaux ligueurs dans le sud-ouest de la France (vers 1562-vers 1610)". In Lemaître, Nicole (ed.). Religion et politique dans les sociétés du midi. Congrès national des sociétés historiques et scientifiques.
- Brunet, Serge (2017). «De l'Espagnol dedans le Ventre!»: Les Catholiques du Sud-Ouest de La France face à La Réforme (vers 1540–1589) Tome 1. Honoré Champion.
- Brunet, Serge (2023). "Jeanne d'Albret, Pierre d'Albret, Évêque de Comminges, et la «Trahison» de Blaise de Monluc. Aux Origines de la Ligue dans le Sud-Ouest de la France". In Berriot-Salvadore, Evelyne; Chareyre, Philippe; Martin-Ulrich, Claudie (eds.). Jeanne d'Albret et sa Cour.
- Champion, Pierre (1939). Charles IX: La France et le Controle de l'Espagne (Tome 1). Grasset.
- Chevallier, Pierre (1985). Henri III: Roi Shakespearien. Fayard.
- Cloulas, Ivan (1979). Catherine de Médicis. Fayard.
- Crété, Liliane (1985). Coligny. Fayard.
- Daussy, Hugues (2015). Le Parti Huguenot: Chronique d'une Désillusion (1557-1572). Droz.
- Diefendorf, Barbara (1991). Beneath the Cross: Catholics and Huguenots in Sixteenth Century Paris. Oxford University Press.
- Gould, Kevin (2016). Catholic Activism in South-West France 1540-1570. Routledge.
- Haan, Bertrand (2011). L'Amitié Entre Princes: Une Alliance Franco-Espagnole au Temps des Guerres de Religion (1560-1570). Presses Universitaires de France.
- Jouanna, Arlette (1998a). "Le Temps des Guerres de Religion en France (1559-1598)". In Jouanna, Arlette; Boucher, Jacqueline; Biloghi, Dominique; Le Thiec, Guy (eds.). Histoire et Dictionnaire des Guerres de Religion.
- Knecht, Robert (2014). Catherine de' Medici. Routledge.
- Moreil, Françoise; Krumenacker, Yves (2024). "Les Institutions Éducatives". In Charere, Philippe; Daussy, Hugues (eds.). La France Huguenote: Histoire Institutionnelle d'une Minorité Religieuse (XVIe-XVIIIe Siècle). Presses Universitaires de Rennes.
- Pailhès, Claudine (2022). Les Comtes de Foix: Des Pyrénées au Trône de France XIe-XVIe Siècle. Éditions Loubatières.
- Pitts, Vincent (2012). Henri IV of France: His Reign and Age. Johns Hopkins University Press.
- Ribera, Jean-Michel (2018). Diplomatie et Espionnage: Les Ambassadeurs du Roi de France auprès de Philippe II - Du Traité du Cateau-Cambrésis (1559) à la mort de Henri III (1589). Classiques Garnier.
- Roberts, Penny (2013). Peace and Authority during the French Religious Wars c.1560-1600. Palgrave Macmillan.
- Roelker, Nancy Lyman (1968). Queen of Navarre: Jeanne d'Albret 1528-1572. Harvard University Press.
- Roelker, Nancy Lyman (1996). One King, One Faith: The Parlement of Paris and the Religious Reformation of the Sixteenth Century. University of California Press.
- Sournia, Jean-Charles (1981). Blaise de Monluc: Soldat et Écrivain (1500-1577). Fayard.
- Sutherland, Nicola (1973). The Massacre of St Bartholomew and the European Conflict 1559-1572. Macmillan.
- Wanegffelen, Thierry (2005). Catherine de Médicis: Le Pouvoir au Fémenin. Payot & Rivages.
