= John I of Penthièvre =

Breton noble (1345–1404)

John I
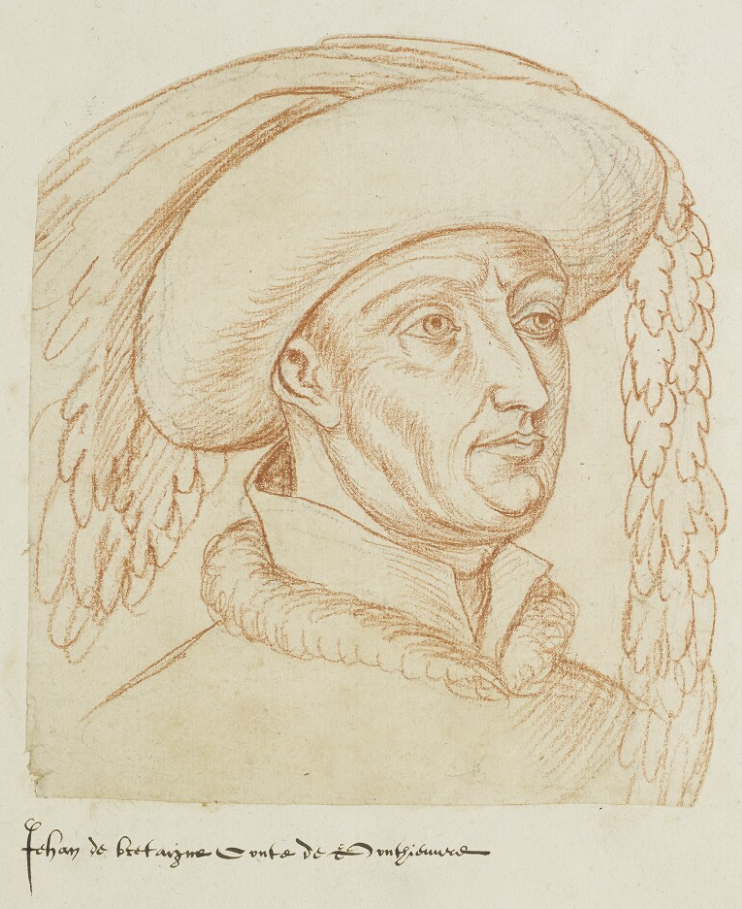

Count of Penthièvre
- Reign: 29 September 1364 – 16 January 1404
- Predecessor: Charles and Joan
- Successor: Olivier
- Born: 5 February 1340; Jurgon-les-Lacs, Brittany (France)
- Died: 16 January 1404 (aged 63); Lamballe, Brittany
- Spouse: Margaret de Clisson
- Issue: Olivier; John; Charles d'Avaugour; William de Limoges; Joan, lady of Belleville
- House: House of Châtillon
- Father: Charles of Blois
- Mother: Joan, Duchess of Brittany

John I (5 February 1340 – 16 January 1404), was Count of Penthièvre and Viscount of Limoges from 1364 to 1404, and the Penthièvre claimant to the Duchy of Brittany.

== Biography ==
John was born in Jurgon-les-Lacs in Brittany while his parents, Joan of Penthièvre and Charles of Blois, ruled over the duchy of Brittany. Joan arranged to marry John to Margaret, daughter of Edward III of England, but Henry of Grosmont, 1st Duke of Lancaster, an ally of the Montforts, broke off the negotiations. Edward offered instead Philippa of Lancaster as a wife, but Joan declined. In 1356, John was given to the English as a hostage and he was held at Gloucester Castle under the care of Robert de Vere, Duke of Ireland and Earl of Oxford for nearly twenty-five years.

On the death in 1380 of Charles V of France, who supported the Penthièvre claim against the Montforts, John and his mother negotiated the second treaty of Guérande on 14 April 1381, in which he renounced his claim to the Duchy of Brittany in exchange for a substantial indemnity. John was released with financial assistance from Olivier de Clisson, who paid his 60,000 franc ransom and offered him his younger daughter, Marguerite, as a wife. On 6 January 1384, John transferred management of all of his lands in Brittany and Limoges to Clisson, who in turn transferred it to Jean Rolland in 1387.

The French chronicler Jean Froissart recounts how, in 1391, John's cousin John IV, Duke of Brittany denounced the Penthièvre claim to the Breton throne, writing:

This count of Penthièvre, our cousin, writes and names himself John of Brittany and carried the arms of Brittany, as if he were the heir. We want him to call himself John, because it is his name, and count of Penthièvre, but we do not want him to adopt the ermine or call himself John of Blois or of Châtillon or anything else. And if he does not do it, we will make him do it and will take from him his land, because he holds it in faith and homage for us; and also regarding the inheritance of Brittany, he should never make a thought that it will return to him, because we have sons and daughters who will be our heirs. If it goes elsewhere, it is because our line has ended.

In 1392, at a meeting at Tours, John renounced his family's right to carry the arms of Brittany. This was later confirmed at Guingamp on 25 October 1395. He inherited the lands of Avesnes, Landrecies, Nouvion-en-Thiérache, and some lands in Flanders on the death of his cousin, Guy II, Count of Blois, in 1397. Three years later, he inherited further property from his brother, Henry, who died in England.

John died in 1404 at Lamballe in Brittany. His eldest son, Olivier, succeeded him. He shared with his three brothers the family inheritance: Olivier received Penthièvre, John the lands of Aigle in Normandy, Charles the lordship of Avaugour, and William the viscounty of Limoges.

== Family ==
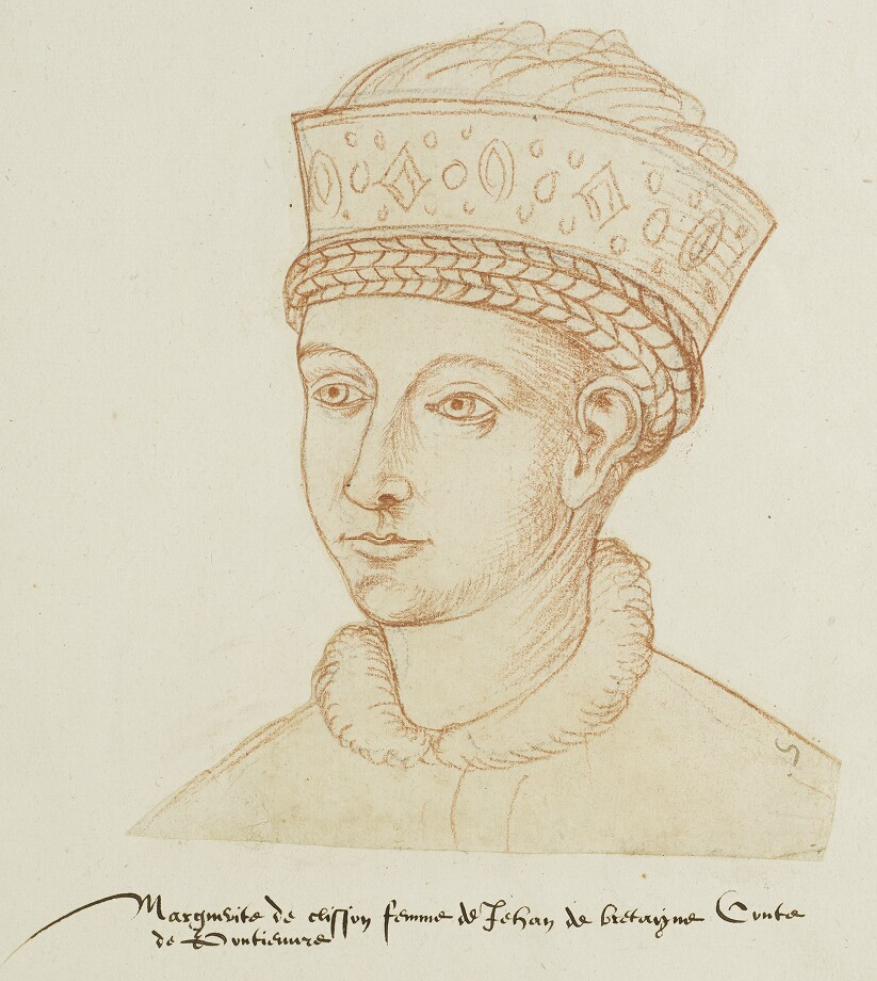
Margaret de Clisson

John married Margaret de Clisson, daughter of Olivier de Clisson, Constable of France, at Moncontour on 20 January 1387. They had:

- Olivier, Count of Penthièvre and Seigneur of Avesnes (d. 1433 without legitimate posterity)
- John, Lord of l'Aigle (d. 1454 without posterity)
- Charles, Baron of Avaugour, through whose daughter, Nicole, the rulers of Penthièvre continued
- William, Viscount of Limoges (d. 1455)
- Joan, who married in 1458 John III de Harpedane, seigneur de Belleville and Montaigu as his second wife (his first wife was Margaret, natural daughter of Charles VI of France).

== Sources ==
- Froissart, Jean (1825). Chronicles of Froissart. Vol. 12.
- Leguay, J. P.; Martin, H. (1997). Fastes et malheurs de la Bretagne ducale 1213-1532. Rennes: Editions Ouest-France Université.
- Smith, Julia H.M. (1995). "Brittany". In Kibler, William W.; Zinn, Grover A. (eds.). Medieval France: An Encyclopedia. Garland Publishing Inc.

French nobility
Preceded by Charles and Joan	Count of Penthièvre; 1364 – 1404; With: Joan; 1364 – 1384	Succeeded by Olivier
Preceded by Charles and Joan	Viscount of Limoges; 1364 – 1404; With: Joan; 1364 – 1384	Succeeded by John II
Titles in pretence
Preceded by Charles and Joan	— TITULAR — Duke of Brittany; 1364 – 1381	Claim abandoned in second Treaty of Guérande
