= Olivier, Count of Penthièvre =

Olivier of Penthièvre

Count of Penthièvre
- Reign: 16 January 1404 – 28 September 1433
- Predecessor: John I
- Successor: John II
- Born: c. 1387
- Died: 28 September 1433; Avesnes, Hainaut
- Burial: Collégiale Saint-Nicolas d'Avesnes-sur-Helpe
- Spouse: 1. Isabella of Burgundy; 2. Joan de Lalaing
- House: House of Châtillon
- Father: John I, Count of Penthièvre
- Mother: Margaret de Clisson

Olivier (died 28 September 1433) was Count of Penthièvre and Lord of Avesnes from 1404 until his death.

== Biography ==
Olivier was the eldest son and heir of John I, Count of Penthièvre and Margaret de Clisson, and the grandson of Joan, Duchess of Brittany and her husband, Charles of Blois, making him the senior claimant to the Breton throne in the Penthièvre line. In 1411, Olivier joined the Armagnacs in the Armagnac-Burgundian Civil War despite being married to Isabella, a daughter of John, Duke of Burgundy. In this capacity, he fought alongside Louis II, Duke of Anjou, at the siege of Bourges in 1412.

Although his father and grandmother had abandoned the family's claim to Brittany in 1381, Margaret and her sons Olivier and Charles de Avaugour plotted to seize the duchy. In 1420, they invited John V, Duke of Brittany to a party at Champtoceaux, where they captured him and threatened him with death if he did not abandon the ducal throne. The French dauphin and regent Charles allowed events to play out, despite outcries from within and outside of France. After holding the duke for five months, Olivier's brother John de L'Aigle, Duchess Joan of Brittany, and the Breton nobility negotiated his release in February 1421.

Reneging on agreements made while in captivity, John V called together the Estates of Brittany and convinced them to condemn Olivier to death and confiscate all of his lands in Brittany. The count retreated first to Limoges and then to Avesnes in Hainaut. While there, he married his second wife, Joan, daughter of Simon IV de Lalaing, Lord of Quiévrain (d. 1467). He died at Avesnes in 1433 without legitimate progeny and was succeeded by his brother, John.

== Family ==
Olivier married as his first wife on 22 July 1406 at Arras Isabella, daughter of John, Duke of Burgundy. She died childless in 1412 at the age of 12.

In 1428, Olivier married as his second wife Jeanne de Lalaing, daughter of Simon IV de Lalaing, Lord of Quiévrain. She died in 1467 without progeny.

== Bibliography ==
- Bourdeaut, Arthur (1913). "Jean V et Marguerite de Clisson. La ruine de Châteauceaux". Bulletin de la société archéologique et historique de Nantes et de Loire-Inférieure. 54: 331–417.
- Bruel, François-L. (1905). "Inventaire de meubles et de titres trouvés au château de Josselin à la mort du connétable de Clisson (1407)". Bibliothèque de l'École des chartes. 66 (66). Librairie Droz: 193–245. doi:10.3406/bec.1905.448236.
- Bulletin de la Société (1996). "Index des nom de personnes". Annuaire-bulletin de la Société de l'histoire de France. Editions de Boccard.
- Duchesne, André (1621). Histoire de la Maison de Chastillon sur Marne avec les genealogies et armes des illustres Familles de France & des Pays-bas, lesquelles y ont esté alliées. Paris: Sabastien Cramoisy. p. 140.
- Jones, Michael (1988). The Creation of Brittany: A Late Medieval State. The Hambledon Press.
- Juvénal des Ursins, Jean (1836). Histoire de Charles VI, Roy de France, et des choses mémorables advenues durant quarante-deux années de son règne, depuis 1380 jusques a 1422. Paris: Michaud & Poujoulat.
- de Saint-Alais (1818). L'art de vérifier les dates des faits historiques, des chartes, des chroniques, et autres anciens monuments, depuis la naissance de Notre-Seigneur. Paris: Valade.
- Sumption, Jonathan (2015). Cursed Kings: The Hundred Years War. Vol. IV. Faber & Faber.
- Vaughan, Richard (2005). John the Fearless: The Growth of Burgundian Power. Vol. 2. The Boydell Press.

French nobility
| Preceded by John I | Count of Penthièvre; 1404 – 1433 | Succeeded by John II |
