= John II of Penthièvre =

Count of Penthièvre
- Reign: 1433 – 1454
- Predecessor: Olivier
- Successor: Nicole
- Died: 1454
- Spouse: Margaret de Chauvigny
- House: House of Châtillon
- Father: John I, Count of Penthièvre
- Mother: Margaret de Clisson

John II, called Jean de L'Aigle (died 1454), was Count of Penthièvre from 1433 until his death. He was also Count of Périgord from 1437.

== Biography ==
John was the second son of John I, Count of Penthièvre, and his wife, Margaret de Clisson, and was granted the lordship of L'Aigle in Normandy upon his father’s death in 1404. When his brothers kidnapped John V, Duke of Brittany, in 1420, John de L'Aigle negotiated for the duke's release on the condition that his youngest brother, William, be released from captivity. The duke agreed, but then refused to cooperate, claiming his agreement was made in a state of duress. William remained in captivity until 1448.

Following the death of his brother Olivier in 1433, John succeeded to his family's hereditary titles in Brittany, including the family's claim to the Breton ducal throne. In 1437, he also purchased the county of Périgord from Charles, Duke of Orléans. He only entered into possession of his Breton lands in 1448 after reconciling with Francis I, Duke of Brittany. During the final campaigns of the Hundred Years’ War, he served as lieutenant general for Charles VII of France in Aquitaine between 1450 and 1451 and he distinguished himself at the Battle of Castillon in 1453.

John married Margaret de Chauvigny, lady of Saint-Chartier, but died without issue in 1454. In his will, he designated his niece and heir general, Nicole, to succeed him in Penthièvre, while his brother William, Viscount of Limoges, succeeded him in Périgord.

== Notes ==
French nobility
Preceded by Olivier	Count of Penthièvre; 1433 – 1454	Succeeded by Nicole
Preceded by Charles	Count of Périgord; 1437 – 1454	Succeeded by William
