= County of Périgord =

Historical region of France

Map of France in 1154, showing location of County of Périgord

The County of Périgord was a historical region of France. The name Périgord derived from the Gaul tribe of the Petrocorii, who resisted the Roman conquest. It was preserved in the early Middle Ages as the Petragoric land (Latin: pagus Petragoricus). Périgord was a fief of the Duchy of Aquitaine, consisting of the three subregions of Périgieux, Bergerac, and Sarlat. The Seneschal of Périgord was responsible for the affairs of the county, ruled as a fief by the Counts of Périgord. The county was bounded on the north by Poitou, on the northeast by Limousin, on the southeast by Quercy. The seat of the county was at Périgueux. Périgord was one of the main battlegrounds of Hundred Years' War between the French and English in the 14th and 15th centuries. Périgord was eventually absorbed into the Kingdom of France in 1398. The County roughly corresponds to the current Dordogne département.

== See also ==
- Périgord & Counts of Perigord
