= Avesnes =

- Commune
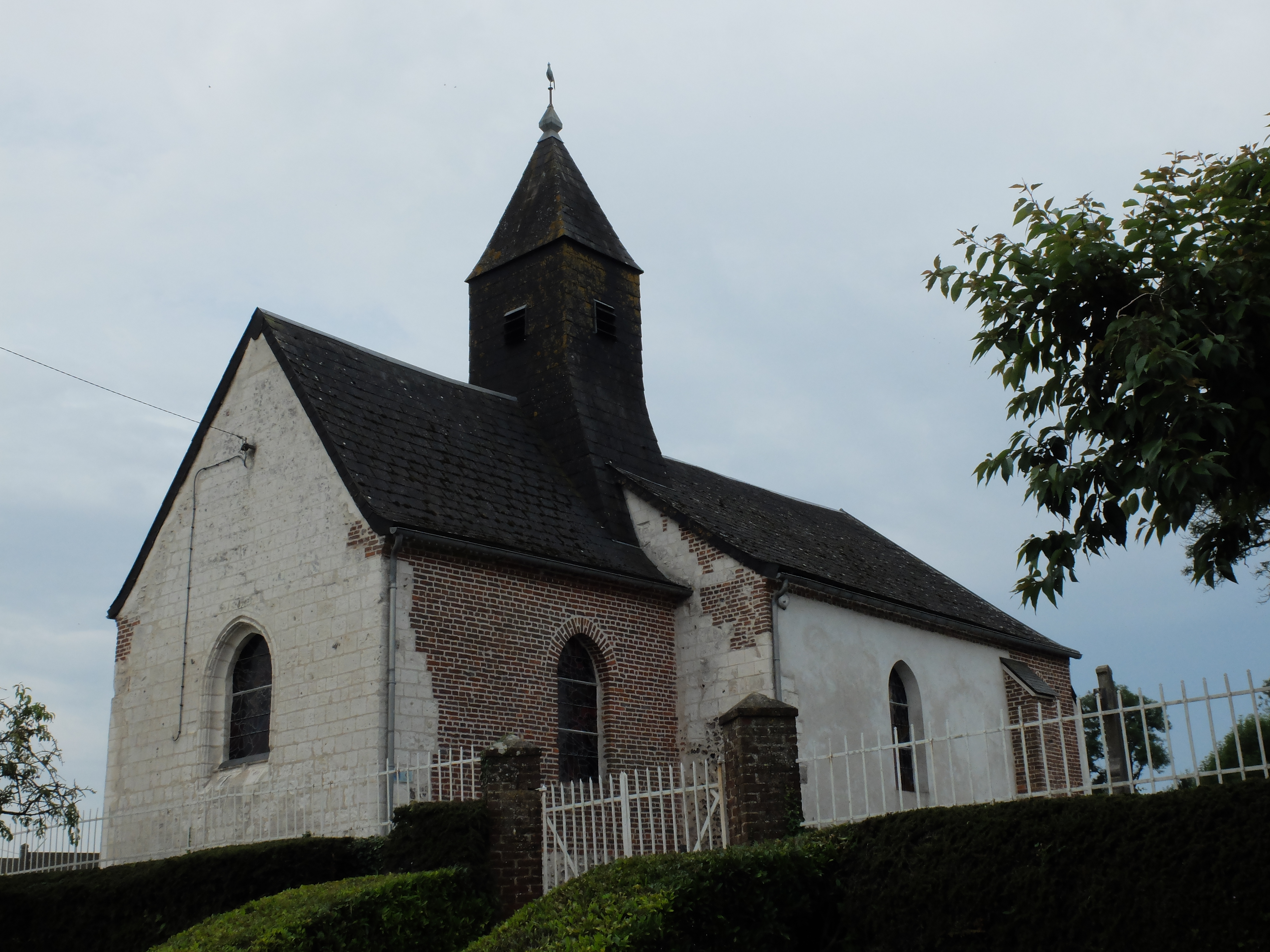
- The church of Avesnes

- Coat of arms
- Location of Avesnes
- Location within France Location within Hauts-de-France
- Coordinates: 50°33′02″N 1°58′21″E
- Country: France
- Region: Hauts-de-France
- Department: Pas-de-Calais
- Arrondissement: Montreuil
- Canton: Lumbres
- Intercommunality: CC Haut Pays du Montreuillois

Government
  - Mayor (2020–2026): Gauthier Benoît
- Area^{1}: 3 km^{2} (1.2 sq mi)
- Elevation: 141 m (463 ft)
- Highest elevation: 187 m (614 ft)
- Lowest elevation: 126 m (413 ft)
- Population (2023): 46
  - Density: 15/km^{2} (40/sq mi)
- Time zone: UTC+01:00 (CET)
  - Summer (DST): UTC+02:00 (CEST)
- INSEE/Postal code: 62062 /62650
- ^{1} French Land Register data, which excludes lakes, ponds, glaciers > 1 km^{2} (0.386 sq mi or 247 acres) and river estuaries.

Avesnes (French pronunciation: [avɛn], Picard: Avinne) is a commune in the Pas-de-Calais department in northern France.

== Geography ==
The commune is a very small village situated some 12 miles (19 km) northeast of Montreuil-sur-Mer, on the D 129 E 1.

== Population ==
Historical population
Year	Pop.	±% p.a.
1968	70	—
1975	53	−3.90%
1982	47	−1.70%
1990	44	−0.82%
1999	46	+0.50%
2007	35	−3.36%
2012	42	+3.71%
2017	52	+4.36%
2023	46	−2.02%
Source: INSEE

== See also ==
- Communes of the Pas-de-Calais department
