= Viscounty of Limoges =

French Fief

Coat of Arms of the ancient Viscounts of Limoges

Between Limoges, Brive and Périgueux, the viscounts of Limoges (French: vicomtes de Limoges), also called viscounts of Ségur created a small principality, whose last heir was Henry IV. Ségur was the main home of these viscounts, in the heart of their domain. The viscounty went from the Limoges-Ségur family to the House of Montfort in Brittany, then to the Albrets and eventually to the Bourbons.

== Territory ==
Their territory included the castles of Ségur, Excideuil, Aixe-su-Vienne, Auberoche and Nontron.

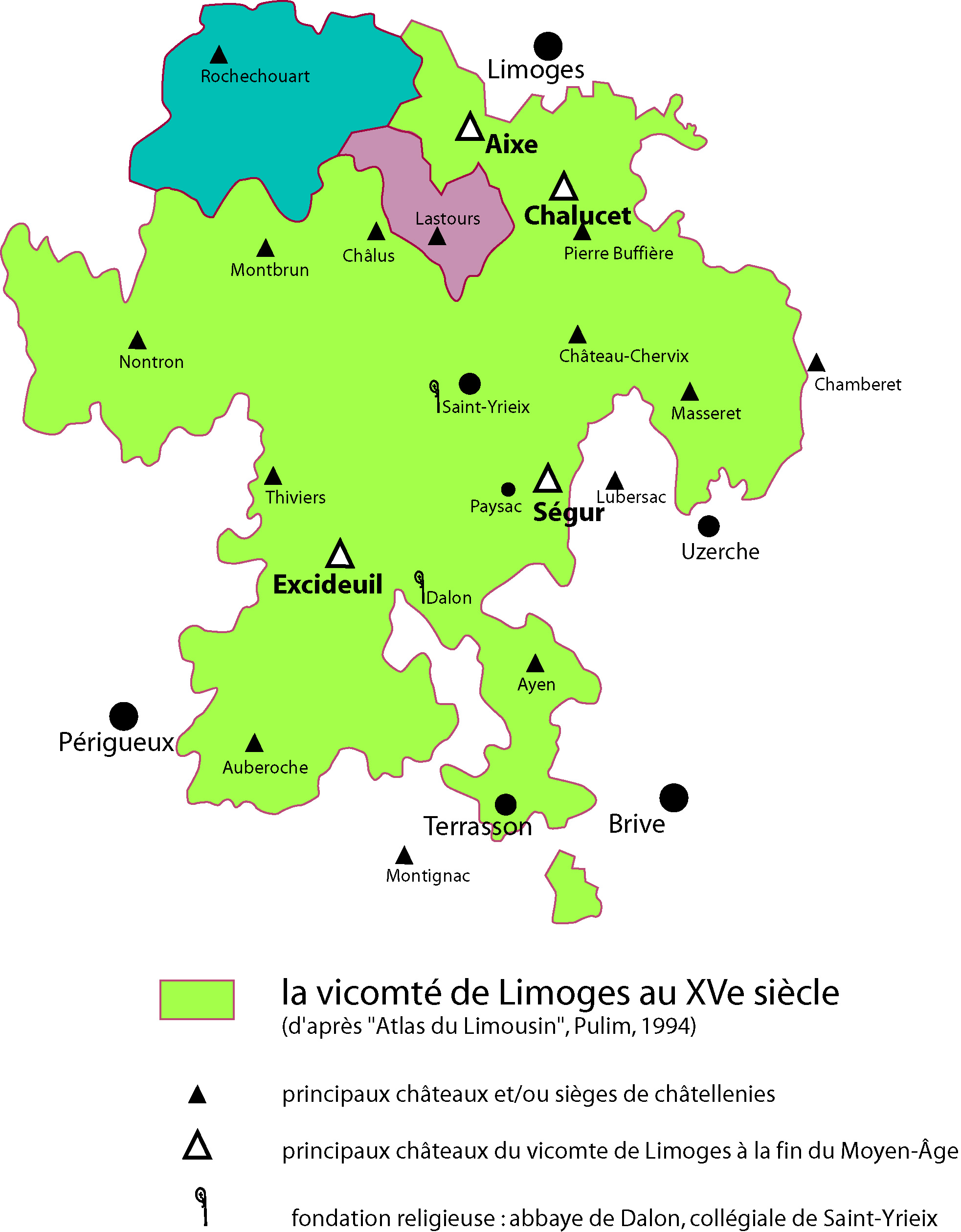
West and sightly south of Dalon Abbey is the town of Hautefort, and south of Lubersac is Pompadour. Although the two Lastours strongholds belonged to the princes of Limoges, they had less power than the viscomital families: Limoges, Comborn, Turenne, Ventadour, Comborn, Aubusson, Rochechouart.

=== Ségur Castle ===
Built in a shingle of the Auvézère River, at the borders of Saint-Eloi, Saint Julien, Payzac and Beyssenac parishes, the place is naturally defensive. The Ségur verteil (headquarters of the castle garrison) was home to the Pérusse family (future dukes of the Cars), Bonneval family (future marquises of Bonneval; Claude Alexandre de Bonneval became a famous Ottoman Empire pasha), and Prévot family (later du Mas family, future marquises of Paysac).

The upper castle is in ruins. Today, the only remaining part is the Pérusse hotel, in the verteil. There are no tours as of December 2006.

=== Excideuil Castle ===
Only two large towers remain, joined together by a screen wall that used to be the aula pinion. The main home (16th or 17th century?) was doubled in width at the beginning of the 20th century. The outward gate of the castle garrison's verteil is a Renaissance door.

=== Aixe Castle ===
A Merovingian castrum was recorded as being at the confluence of the river. The Château d'Aixe (or Jeanne d'Albret Tower) was constructed in the 13th century in Aixe-sur-Vienne, controlled by the viscounts of Limoges. It was demolished at the beginning of the 19th century.

=== Auberoche Castle ===
Probably around 1037 or 1059, the successor of Bishop Frotaire (the castrum founder) is said to have given Auberoche Castle to the Viscount of Limoges, in order to get the protection of this secular lord against the Count of Périgord.

The Viscount of Limoges acknowledged the bishop of Périgueux as his suzerain, in relation to Auberoche, as early as the last third of the 12th century (1154–1157). By this submission, the viscount extended his domination up to the Périgord episcopal and county headquarters gates. Therefore, the viscounts of Limoges could maintain and use their political and economic power at the gates of Périgueux. The castle became a chaplain center which included 16 parishes (in 1365) and controlled two main, convergent traffic streams towards Périgueux city, through the Auvézère and Manoir valleys.

Confirmed as soon as September 1257, the judicial and administrative power was enforced in the whole district area by a provost, the agent of the viscount of Limoges.
