= Cemeteries of Nantes =

Cemeteries in Nantes

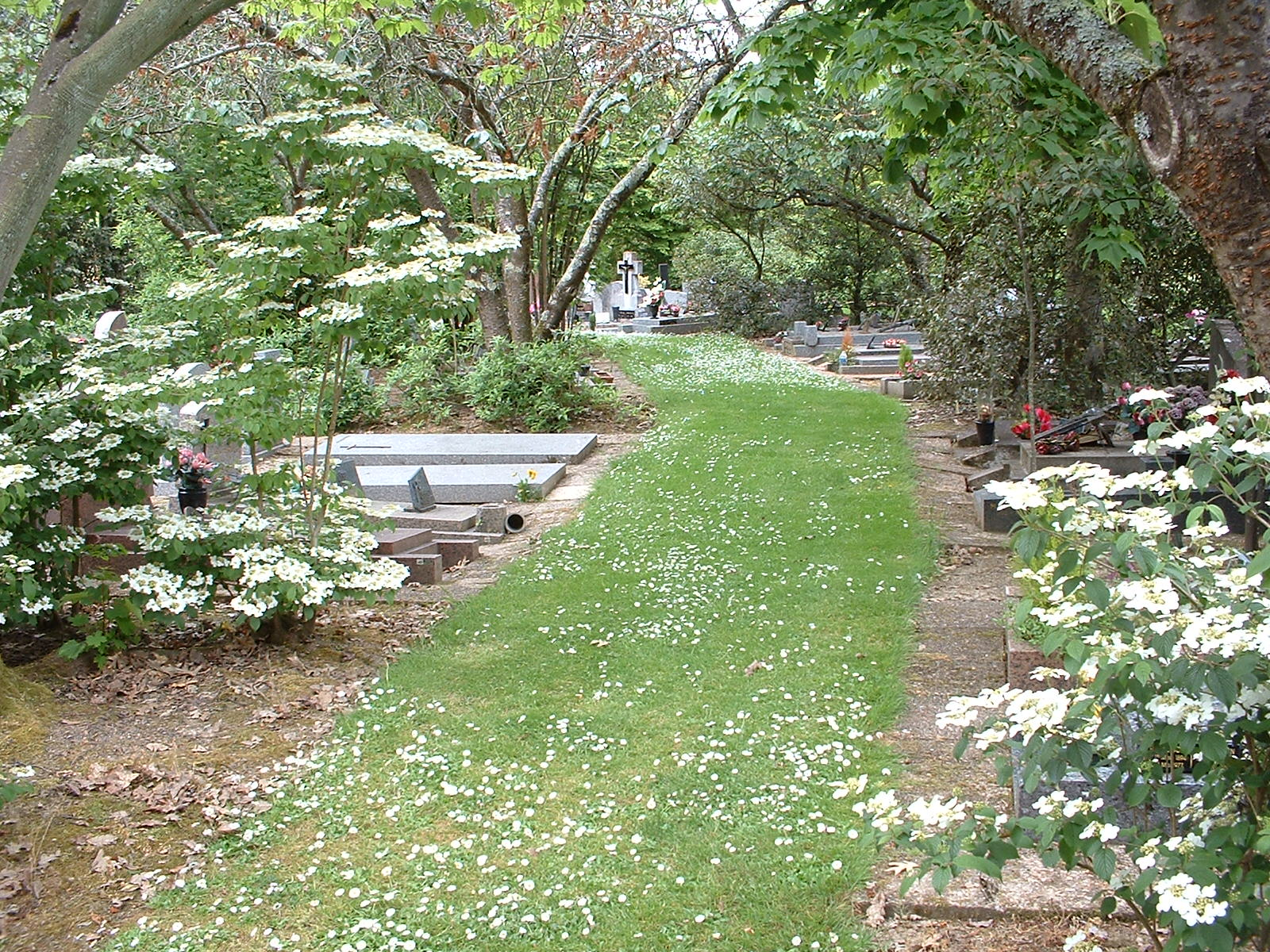
- An alley in Cimetière Parc.
- Interactive map of Cemeteries of Nantes

Details
- Location: Nantes, Pays de la Loire
- Country: France
- Type: Catholic, Protestant, Jewish, Muslim

The cemeteries of Nantes have each developed a unique history, with some being more notable than others. Each cemetery has its share of remarkable inhabitants. Since 1979, at least fifteen cemeteries have been operational within the commune of Nantes (at least to some extent). The cemeteries of Nantes include Bouteillerie, Chauvinière, Cimetière Parc, Miséricorde, Pont du Cens, Saint-Clair, Saint-Donatien, Saint-Jacques, Saint-Joseph-de-Porterie, Saint-Martin (old and new), Sainte-Anne (old and new), Toutes-Aides, and Vieux-Doulon.

The location of cemeteries has undergone a significant evolution over time, with a preference for sites both outside the city and close to places of worship, particularly churches (on occasion, even within their confines). Many cemeteries, including those in Saint-Léonard, Chamfleury, and the Huguenots, have ceased to exist. The number, organization, and appearance of the necropolises that Nantes residents know in the 21st century have been shaped by some factors, including public health considerations, political and economic choices, religious oppositions (against Jews and later Protestants), wars (the Vendée War and both World Wars), and so forth.

The respect given to beliefs, convictions, burial choices, the geographical location in fully urbanized areas (with one exception), and current regulations can be attributed to a historical process.

== Historical evolution of burial sites in Nantes ==
=== Antiquity ===
In the 3rd century, inhumation replaced the custom of cremation, which seems to have completely disappeared around the year 410 under the influence of Christian prescriptions. However, the custom of inhumation is very ancient. The deceased were buried in the ground or in stone sarcophagi, often with personal items. For urban dwellers, burial had to occur outside the city, where no tombs or funeral pyres were permitted. In Nantes, graves were placed along the axes leading to the city, at its gates. The steles from this period were demolished during the construction of the Roman enclosure in the 3rd century. The fate of the deceased from wealthy families was different: they were buried in the "villas." In the late Antiquity period, the necropolises were located northeast of the enclosure, near the Saint-André chapel as well as the Saint-Similien and Saint-Donatien churches. The oldest funerary relic discovered in Nantes is a pink marble tombstone, unearthed in 1869 at the site of the Cordeliers convent, situated to the southwest of Roger-Salengro Square (formerly known as "Prefecture square") during the construction of a chapel for the "ladies of the Retreat," who were then resident at the establishment.

=== Spread of Christian rituals ===
==== Early cemeteries ====
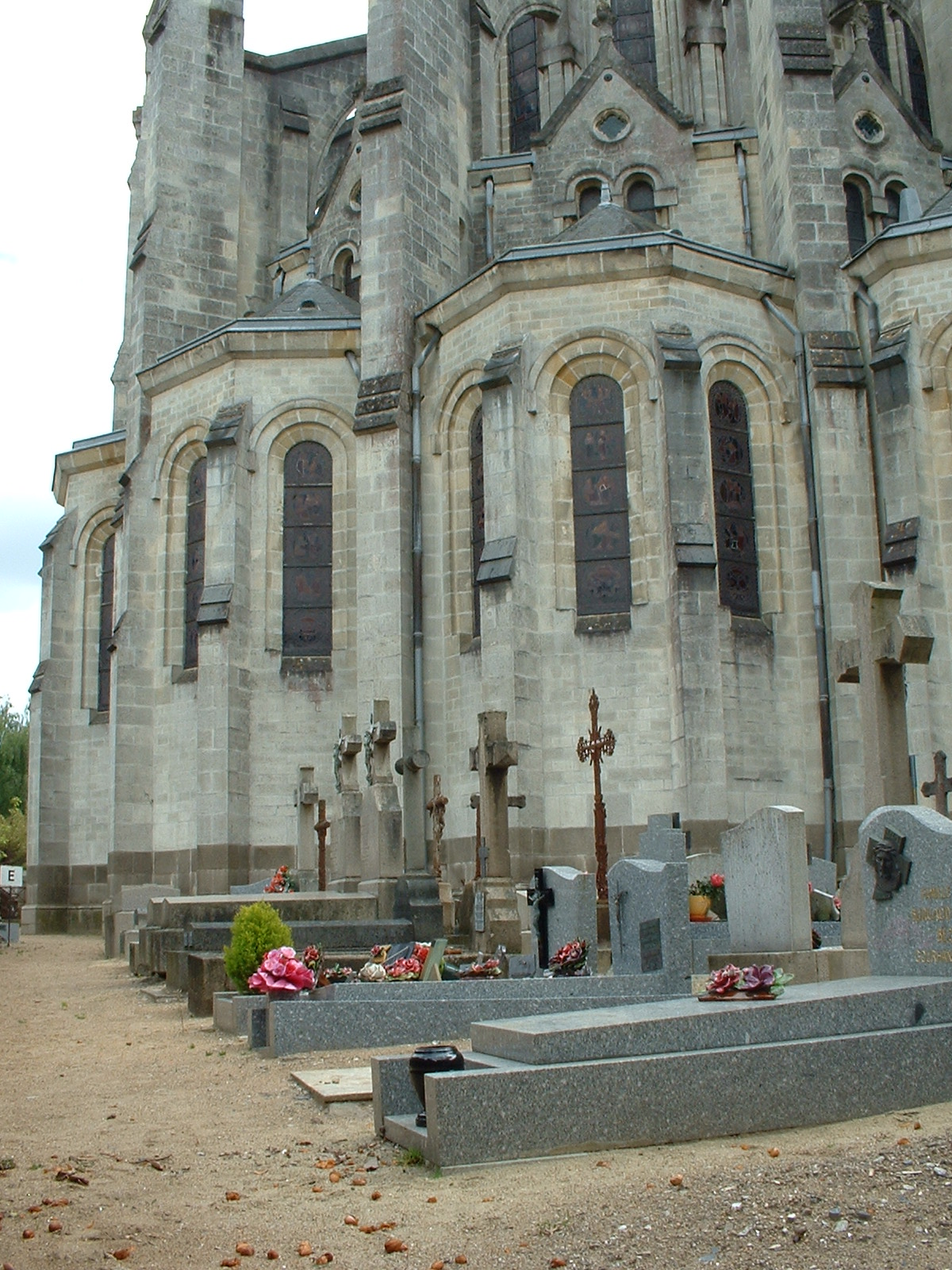
Graves adorned with crosses at the foot of the northeastern exterior of the Saint-Donatien church.

The two Christian martyrs Saint Donatien and Saint Rogatien, buried with their ancestors, exemplify this. Indeed, Christians opted for inhumation; they oriented the coffins eastward, towards Jerusalem and the rising sun. This Christian ritual strongly influenced the funeral history in Nantes. The remains of Merovingian graves have been discovered at the locations of Maréchal-Foch Square, Argentré Street, Labouchère Street, and in the garden of the Minée house (near Georges-Clemenceau Street). At the time, pagan culture was still a significant presence in the area. The public cemetery was situated between the Erdre and the current Moquechien and Jeanne-d'Arc streets, and the Bourgneuf district. Another cemetery was in the area currently occupied by Saint-Similien church and Martray Square. Adjacent to pagan tombs was a stele dedicated to a martyr.

==== Burial in churches and surroundings ====
Christianity introduced a new custom: the burial of the deceased within churches or near them. The surrounding area of churches was used to collect the remains of children who had died before baptism, wanderers, and the poor. Without the use of fences, these cemeteries were places of passage, and gathering, where even merchants could settle, where children played, and animals grazed.

The French language reflects the relationship between these exterior cemeteries and sacred buildings. The words "parvis" and "paradise" share a common root. What is currently a bare square adjacent to buildings was once a place where the dead were laid to rest. Before its reconstruction in the 15th century, the Saint-Nicolas church was smaller and oriented west-east. To the north, a cemetery ran alongside it, at the site of the current apse and transept (another cemetery occupied the future site of the Feltre market). Another example is the space in front of the cathedral's west facade, which was later named Saint-Pierre Square. This area was occupied by a cemetery until 1617. Abbé Travers described it as comprising two cemeteries enclosed by hedges, planted with trees, and separated by the road leading from the Saint-Pierre gate to the city center. Travers even supposes this cemetery was a single entity before the end of the 12th century. The exposure of these cemeteries contributed to their devaluation, as previously discussed. Parishioners observed the lack of dignity associated with exterior cemeteries and, in a gesture of respect for their deceased, increasingly opted for interment within churches.

==== Resistance to moving burial sites away ====
In 1719, the Parliament of Brittany enacted legislation banning burials in churches in the wake of a scarlet fever epidemic in Rennes. This marked the first instance in France where a secular institution designated places of worship as contamination centers due to the burials performed there. However, the population was reluctant to bury their dead outside churches, as it was perceived as an act of disrespect. Consequently, parishioners continued to bury their deceased in churches, but at night. In the 18th century, many wills stipulated the desire for burial in a holy place, with the parish church being the most common choice. However, other locations such as convents or cloisters were also frequently mentioned. In the absence of a parish cemetery, the last resort was to be buried in the cemetery of the church in question.

However, attitudes gradually shifted, and when the soil of places of worship was banned from burials, in 1760, the parishioners demanded the creation of cemeteries. This was the case for the Sainte-Radegonde parish, which covered the ducal castle and only about twenty houses, and Saint-Laurent, which had only a hundred parishioners; these two churches did not have a funeral enclosure. During this same period, the Nantes municipality requisitioned the Saint-Léonard cemetery to allow the layout of a new road, which serves as an indication of the prevailing mindset of the time: urban space must be reserved for the living. From this period onward, although cemeteries were not generally organized, they were nonetheless enclosed and well-maintained.

=== Burial sites at the end of the Ancien Régime ===
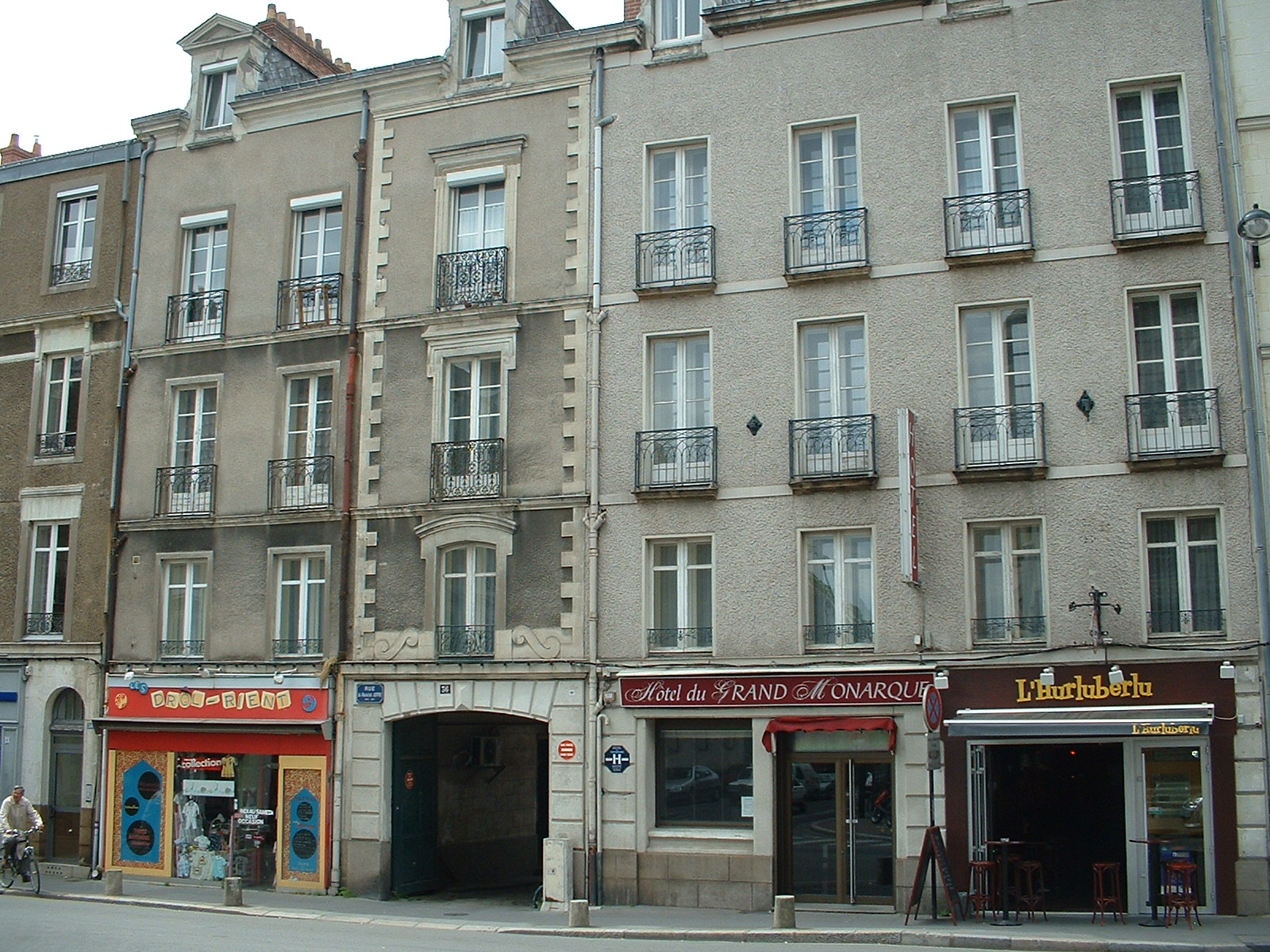
Site of the former Chamfleuri cemetery.

Nantes expanded over time. The original city limits were gradually absorbed, along with the burial sites located within them. Before the French Revolution, Nantes was divided into twelve parishes, each of which had at least one place of worship. These parishes were accompanied by a burial site, either located beside or within the place of worship.

Saint-Similien had two cemeteries: the large cemetery, which was known as the "cemetery of bones" and was located near the Saint-Symphorien chapel, and a smaller cemetery located around the church, which was reserved for the burial of young children. Saint-Clément had the Champ-fleuri (or Chamfleuri) cemetery, located at the corner of the current Marshal-Joffre and Geoffroy-Drouet streets. This cemetery was transferred in 1774 to La Bouteillerie. Despite the disappearance of the small Saint-Jean church in the 15th century, its cemetery remained active for a long time (Saint-Pierre gate). From September 1470 until the French Revolution, the northwest side of the current Ogée street was occupied by the cemetery of the Notre-Dame parish collegiate, which was sold in 1790 and subsequently destroyed, along with the graves it contained, including that of Alain Barbe-Torte. In front of the drawbridge of the Duke of Brittany's castle stood the Sainte-Radegonde parish and its cemetery until 1780. The Sainte-Croix church had its cemetery on its south side, and the Saint-Saturnin church, whose graves were located on the current Sainte-Croix square, was situated nearby. Saint-Nicolas had a burial site at the location of the current basilica's choir, and another on the current Cacault street. The Saint-Léonard parish cemetery was located on Garde-Dieu Street. After the Saint-Laurent impasse was the Saint-Laurent parish cemetery (which included the notable tomb of Mathurin Rodier), whose church also contained graves.

Additionally, burials were conducted within the confines of Saint-Denis church, situated on the same street, as well as within the precincts of Saint-Vincent church, located on Saint-Vincent Street. Furthermore, numerous monasteries in Nantes, including the Cordeliers, Jacobins, Carmes, Capucins, Chartreux, Visitandines, Carmelites, Clarisses, Tertiaries of Saint-Elizabeth, Penitents, and others, had designated burial sites. This practice persisted as long as religious institutions remained operational. One such example is the domain of the Oblates, where a private cemetery, preserved until the 21st century, was used for deceased nuns' burials in a private cemetery around a small chapel that housed the remains of the mother superiors.

The "cemetery of the executed," which dates from the 15th century, was located on a marsh named "Pré Nian", which is now the area between Brancas Alley, Du Couëdic Street, Cassard Alley, Orléans Street, and Félix-Fournier Square. It served to bury the bodies of individuals from the Sainte-Catherine hospital and executed individuals. It was later called the "Huguenots cemetery." An attempt to relocate the cemetery, which was situated in an area undergoing urban expansion, was unsuccessful due to the refusal of the local parishioners to inter the executed with their dead.

=== Formation of modern cemeteries ===
==== Health hazards related to burial sites ====
In 1565, the well situated near the cemetery on Saint-Pierre Square was found to be contaminated. This incident, which occurred centuries ago, highlighted the long-standing issue of the proximity of decomposing bodies and water supply points. In the 18th century, the issue of the unsanitary conditions of cemeteries located within city walls arose. In 1719, the Parliament of Brittany sought to prohibit burials in churches following a scarlet fever epidemic in Rennes. In Nantes, residents near cemeteries protested due to the presence of "mephitic exhalations". (Note: The term "mephitic" describes gases produced by the organic matter decomposition and unpleasant odors associated with them. It is also used to indicate the potential health effects of these gases.) In the Gazette de la santé dated February 10, 1774, it was reported that near Nantes, when a man had just died, it was decided to transfer the bodies of his deceased family members buried elsewhere to his grave, resulting in the death of the four individuals handling the exhumation and severe poisoning of the six priests present. This incident served to illustrate the potential dangers posed by decomposing bodies. During epidemics, the mortality rate increased markedly, leading to the establishment of cemeteries situated beyond the city walls.

==== Birth of general cemeteries ====
In the 18th century, general cemeteries emerged as a result of royal edicts and were subsequently confirmed by the Parliament of Brittany in 1755, 1757, 1761, and 1772. According to A. Lemaître, the disqualification of the regular clergy at the end of the Ancien Régime led municipal officials to target church property to create public spaces and burial sites. In Nantes, the land belonging to the Carmelites was a source of contention. On March 10, 1776, a Royal Declaration by Louis XVI regulated burials inside churches. While these were not prohibited outright, the new conditions effectively reserved them for a minority of privileged individuals. The same Declaration mandated the expansion of existing cemeteries and even the relocation of those that "could harm the healthiness of the air" in cities. Two years before this proclamation, the city of Nantes made a forward-thinking acquisition: the La Bouteillerie estate, which was subsequently transformed into a cemetery. This cemetery was consecrated on October 25, 1774, with the first burial occurring on the same day: that of René Jannequin, who was approximately thirteen years of age. The second recorded burial was that of Guillaume Grou, a prominent Nantes shipowner. He had expressed a desire to be buried in the church of Saint-Clément, but the newly enacted regulations prohibiting burials in religious edifices thwarted this intention.

==== "Complementary" cemeteries of the Revolution ====
During the revolutionary period, there was an increase in mortality rates. As director of the Nantes Botanical Garden from 1803 to 1820, Jean Hectot collaborated with his predecessor François Le Meignen to document the site of the second Botanical Garden. In his account, Hectot observed that "to the east, An excavation of 150 feet by 30 feet revealed the rock after the soil was stripped to bury the numerous corpses resulting from the civil war, the Terror, but even more so from the "warehouse disease," which was a term used to describe the spread of typhus. For example, in January 1794, 2,500 individuals were executed over a single month. On January 24, 1794, the La Bouteillerie facility reached its maximum capacity, resulting in its closure. The municipality subsequently utilized land belonging to the Carmes of Nantes, situated close to the Miséricorde chapel, with the inaugural burial occurring in May 1793. In the aftermath of the Chouan attack on June 29, 1793, the cemetery was subjected to extensive desecration.

As the number of deaths and the lack of available labor increased, on 29 Nivôse year II (January 18, 1794), the municipality requested that citizens bury the numerous corpses themselves. However, the existing cemeteries offered insufficient space, (Note: Leblouck 1982, p. 139) prompting the Health Commission, established by Jean-Baptiste Carrier, to address the issue. From 10 Pluviôse year II (January 29, 1794) to 16 Ventôse year II (March 6, 1794), four mass graves were established, accommodating 373, 462, 391, and 125 bodies, respectively. On 23 Pluviôse (February 12), a cemetery was officially established along the road to Rennes, in a quarry operated by "citizen Henry, on the land of citizen Jogues." (Note: Leblouck 1982, p. 140) By this date, 600 bodies had already been deposited there. Of the 11,969 bodies buried between 26 Nivôse and 30 Thermidor (January 15 and August 17, 1794) in the sites listed by the Health Commission, 5,639 were buried in the "cemetery" on the road to Rennes, (Note: Leblouck 1982, p. 141) along with 798 animal carcasses buried at the same location. In late October 1794, the commission reported the occurrence of "pestilential exhalations." It was suspected that the gravediggers were responsible for the contamination, which was believed to be the result of shoddy workmanship for financial gain. (Note: Leblouck 1982, p. 142)

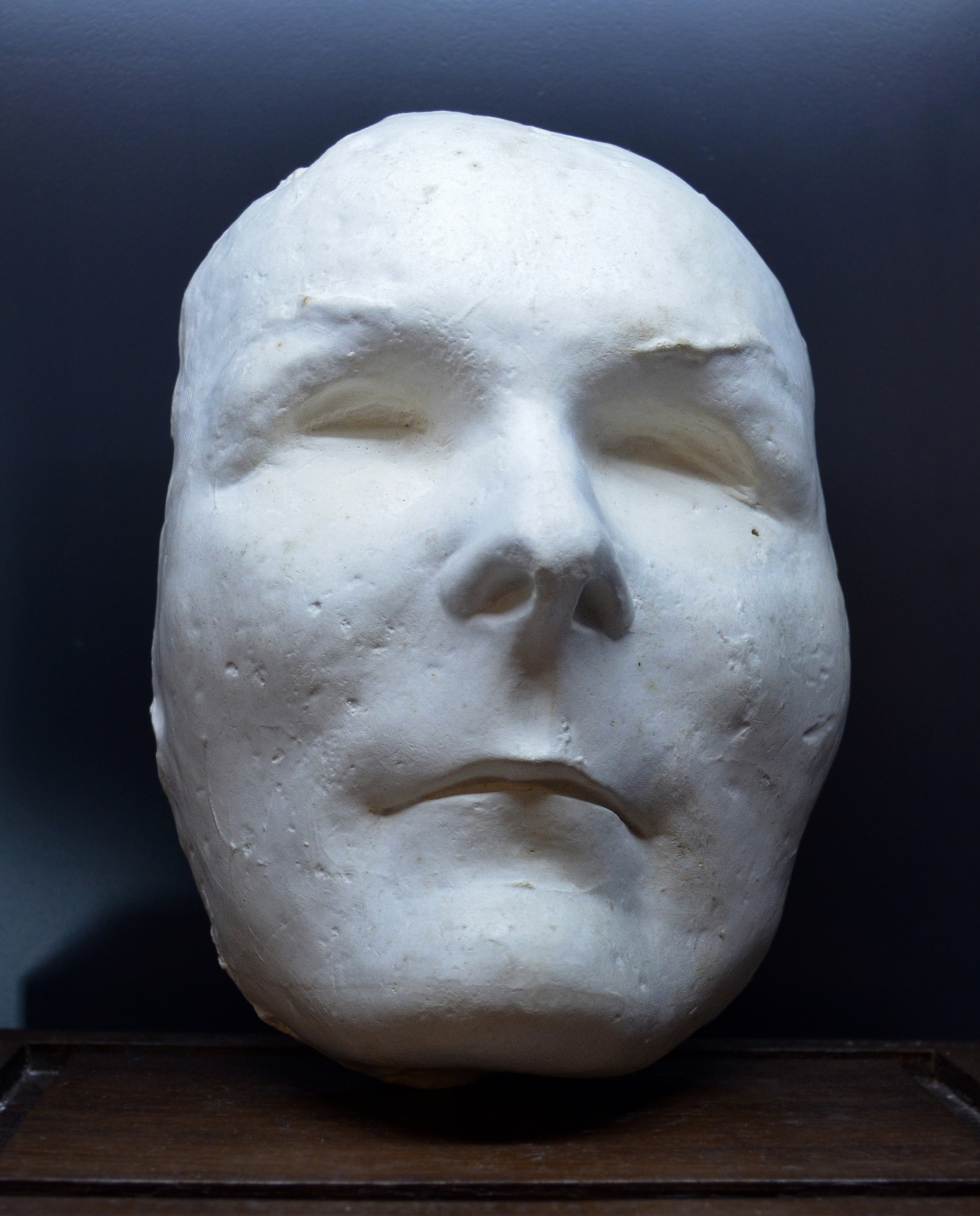
Charette's death mask (mask from the second cast by Cazane - 12 germinal, an IV) - Historial de Vendée - Les Lucs-sur-Boulogne, Vendée.

Upon Charette's interment in the cemetery, a plaster cast of his face was created 25 hours after his demise by the plasterer-visage Jean Cazanne, who resided on Crébillon Street. Cazanne was suspected of having exploited the opportunity to steal the body, necessitating the production of a second cast under the supervision of three police commissioners. This cast was then covered with earth and additional corpses from hospitals were placed upon it.

In the year V of the French Republic, 1796, four cemeteries were officially maintained: La Bouteillerie, the cemetery on the road to Rennes, the cemetery at "pré Dachon near the fort château-Gaillard" (near Miséricorde), and the cemetery "at the entrance of the road to Clisson" (Saint-Jacques). The establishment of these cemeteries coincided with the cessation of mass graves. In the years following the French Revolution, the state of the Dachon and the road to Rennes cemeteries came under scrutiny. The former was not enclosed, the latter was located on a main road, and they were deemed unworthy. As a result, the cemetery on the road to Rennes ceased to be used around 1801-1802. During the Restoration period, attempts to place a monument on the site of the road to Rennes were unsuccessful. In 1825, the owner of the quarry agreed to sell it. Mr. Houeix de la Brousse sought to enclose the land, plant trees, and place a black marble stele with the inscription "Pax illis." (Note: In English, Peace to them all) However, the subject was deemed too sensitive, and no action was taken. The site was almost forgotten until its accidental rediscovery in 1981. In 1943 and 1952, Dr. G. Halgan referenced the site in the Bulletin de la Société archéologique et historique de Nantes. In 1981, the discovery of human bones and remnants of the temporary necropolis during construction work on Costes-et-Le-Brix Street (between Paul-Bellamy Street and Lelasseur Boulevard) brought the cemetery on the road to Rennes back into the public eye. A mass grave measuring 25 meters long and 8 meters wide was unearthed. On February 23, 1997, the Souvenir Vendée association placed a plaque on the site, on Avenue du Lavoir (a dead-end street). The inscription commemorates the "memory of Charette and more than 8,000 people."

Additionally, there is a "Vendée cemetery," situated at the same level as the Gigant quarries or perrières, which is known as the "Field of Martyrs." A stele remains in the memory of the 4,000 individuals from Nantes and Vendée who perished.

==== Napoleonic regulation ====
The imperial decree on "Burials and Places dedicated to them," which was applied in Nantes in the year XIII, was promulgated on 23 Prairial year XII:

Article 1: No burial shall take place in churches, temples, synagogues, hospitals, public chapels, or generally in any enclosed and closed buildings where citizens gather for the celebration of their worship, nor within the confines of towns and villages.

Article 2: Outside each town or village, at a distance of at least thirty-five to forty meters from their confines, there shall be grounds specifically dedicated to the burial of the dead.

Article 3: Preferably, the highest grounds exposed to the north will be chosen. They will be enclosed by walls at least two meters high. Plantations will be made there, taking suitable precautions to not obstruct the air circulation.

Article 4: Each burial will take place in a separate grave. Each grave opened will be 1.50 to 2 meters deep and 0.80 meters wide and will be subsequently filled with well-compacted earth.

Article 5: The graves will be spaced 3 to 4 decimeters apart on the sides and 3 to 5 decimeters at the head and feet.

Article 6: To avoid the danger of very frequent grave renewals, the opening of graves for new burials will only take place every 5 years; therefore, the grounds intended to form the burial places will be 5 times larger than the space necessary to accommodate the presumed number of dead that can be buried there each year. (...)

Article 15: In communes where several religions are practiced, each religion must have a separate burial place; and if there is only one cemetery, it will be divided by walls, hedges, or ditches into as many parts as there are different religions, with a separate entrance for each, and the space will be proportioned to the number of inhabitants of each religion.

In 1847, the municipality, led by Ferdinand Favre, attempted to create a cemetery in compliance with the law to replace Miséricorde and La Bouteillerie, which had been absorbed by urbanization and were therefore too close to residences. On May 11, 1847, the municipal council voted to acquire a 7-hectare plot of land outside the city limits, situated between the roads leading to Vannes and Rennes. However, the city encountered opposition from Mr. Le Lasseur, whose lands were to be requisitioned, and he received support from the prefect. Nantes found itself in a quandary between the State's refusal in 1839 to authorize the expansion of existing cemeteries, which would contravene the 1804 law, and the prefect's refusal to support the creation of a new cemetery. Ultimately, the private individual prevailed, leading to the pragmatic expansion of Miséricorde and Bouteillerie in defiance of the 1804 law.

==== Integration of cemeteries into urban fabric ====
In 1881, Nantes, under the leadership of Charles Lechat, enacted a mandate requiring the use of funeral carriages for transporting deceased persons over the age of eight, replacing the practice of using bearers. From 1890, municipal employees assumed responsibility for grave digging. Before the mandatory use of coffins, corpses were interred in shrouds, which decomposed rapidly. Public health measures led to the emergence of bourgeois burials, characterized by the use of fine clothes, personal effects, and perpetual concessions.

In the 1890s, the issue of expanding cemetery areas once again emerged. The sale of concessions had become a source of municipal revenue. As expansion necessitated investment and investment required revenue, Nantes opted to increase prices to align with other cities of a similar size. In some instances, this resulted in a 100% price increase, which was justified under the pretext of modernization.

Subsequently, the Nantes architect Paul Coupry presented a proposal for the construction of modern cemeteries equipped with a sanitation system of his design. He authored a brochure entitled Les Cimetières barbares du XIXe siècle remplacés par les Cimetières de l'avenir and patented his system, which received recognition at the International Hygiene Exhibition in Paris in 1888. The method is based on the observation that corpses in contact with water poison the environment. It involves the constant draining and drying of the subsoil through a network of small and large collector aqueducts. Following experiments conducted in Saint-Nazaire, the company established by Coupry to market his process reached an agreement with the municipality of Alfred Riom in Nantes. This agreement entailed the testing of his system on 200 square meters at the Miséricorde cemetery, an operation carried out in 1898. Concurrently, in 1897, the Town Hall increased the concession fees.

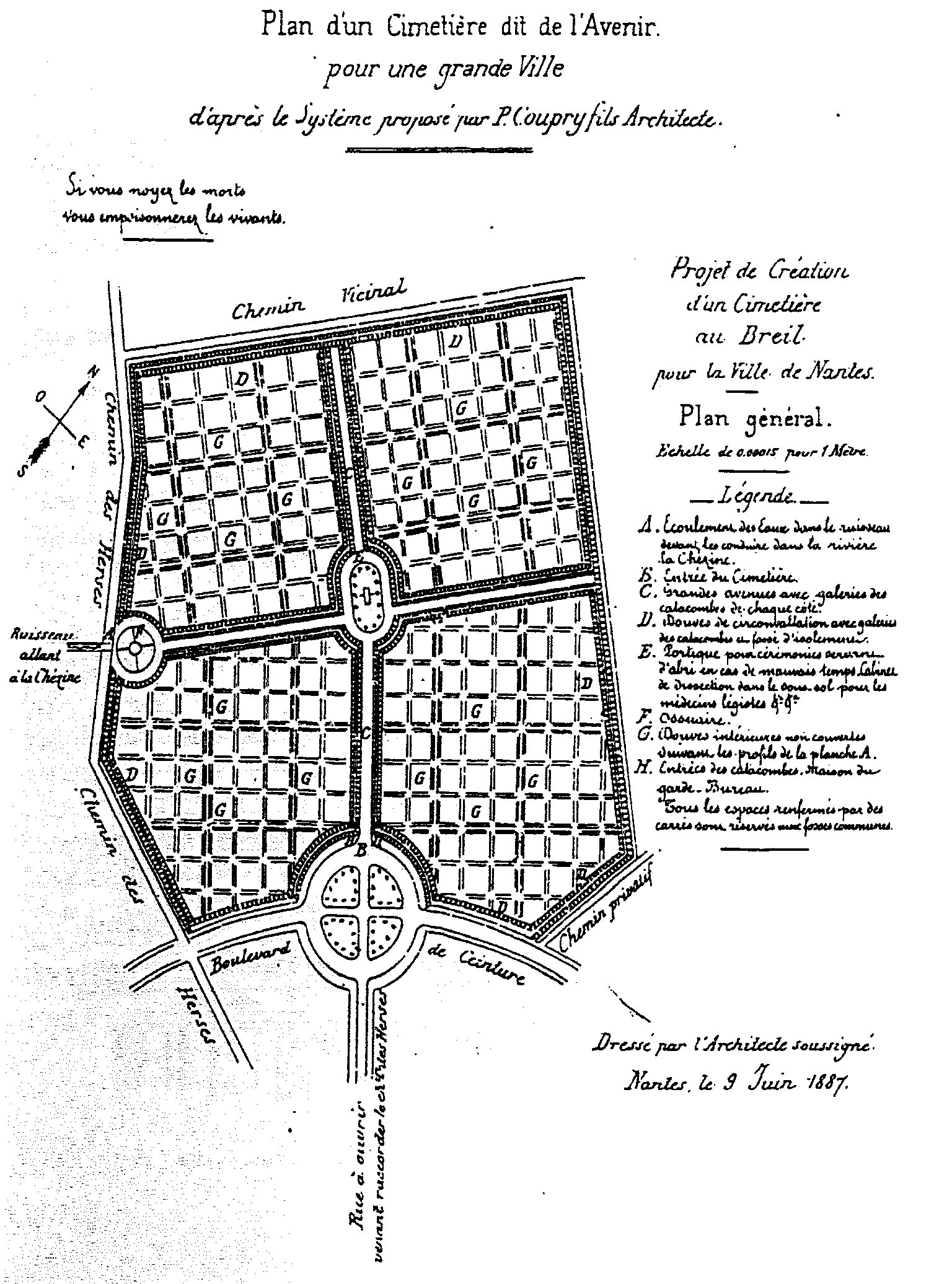
Plan of Coupry: Cimetière de l'avenir project at Le Breil.

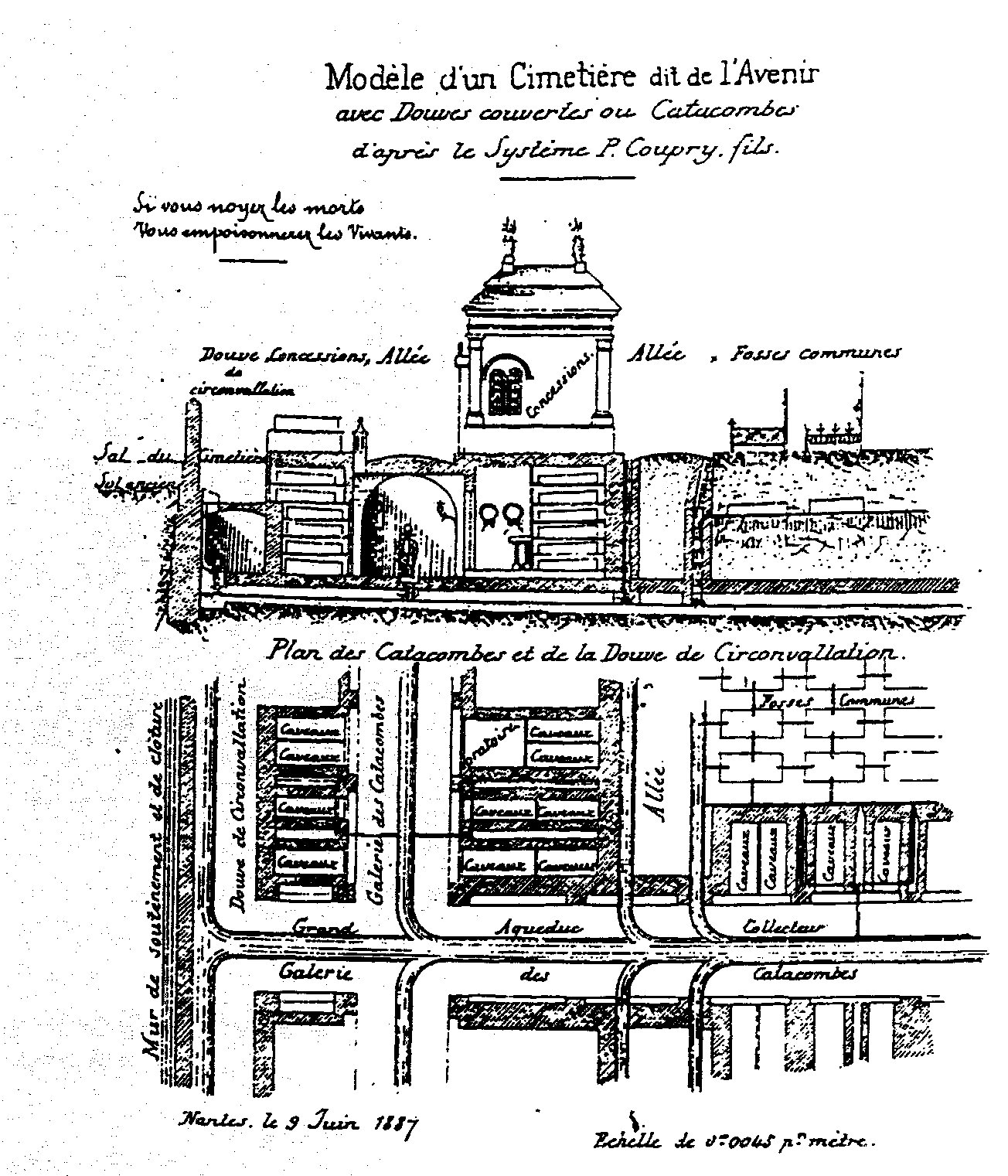
Plan of Coupry describing its wastewater system.

However, the results were not deemed satisfactory by local officials, primarily due to the financial burden associated with implementing Coupry's proposed system and the subsequent dissolution of his collaboration with the company (a similar fate befell him in Bordeaux). This account illustrates the transformation of cemeteries in Nantes, which were previously non-monetary and often unhealthy under the Ancien Régime, into financially exploitable and, for commercial interests, healthy sites. They were granted the right to remain within the urban fabric. The pressure on land eventually led to the exodus of burial sites, with the rising price per square meter prompting the establishment of the Cemetery Park in a remote location outside the city center, only in 1979.

The costs associated with the maintenance and expansion of cemeteries have been on the rise over time. In 1908, the sale of perpetual concessions was discontinued. The cremation process, which city managers had considered as a potential solution to the problem of limited burial space, encountered moral and religious issues. The incineration of bodies was already discussed in Nantes in 1890 and debated in the 1930s, and a project for a public cremation site was considered and then abandoned in the 1970s in the Cemetery Park. It took until 1989 for the crematorium to become operational.

=== A place for non-Catholic religious burials ===
Most graves adhere to the Catholic rite. However, since the late 19th century, individuals of other religious faiths have had the option of interring their deceased according to their traditions. This has resulted in the designation of specific areas for various religious groups, including a Muslim section and a Jewish section.

==== Jewish burial sites ====
The precise location of the first Jewish cemetery, referenced in an old inventory of the priory and documented in a document from 1231, is uncertain. It was situated in the vicinity of the Saint-Cyr church, at a location designated as Saut des Chiens, which encompasses the area currently served by Saint-Léonard Street and Garde-Dieu Street. (Note: Durville 1977, p. 431) At the time, this area was situated beyond the city walls. A Jew privately purchased this site for his professional funeral business. The massacre of Jews in Nantes in 1236, followed by an edict banning Jews from Brittany pronounced by Duke John the Red in 1240, led to the complete disappearance of the city's Jewish community. Only the remains of passing Jews, itinerant merchants, and peddlers were buried there. (Note: Durville 1977, p. 432)

The emergence of Protestantism and the period up to the 1870s saw the Jewish section of the cemetery enclosed within the Protestant section. In 1876, a request from the Jewish authorities of Nantes to the Town Hall indicated that this cemetery also served to bury Jews from cities such as Angers, Brest, Quimper, and Rennes, whose communities did not have a Jewish cemetery. In 1892, the Jewish community requested the expansion of the Jewish cemetery at the Miséricorde cemetery, which had been secured with 650 square meters of land. This expansion was accompanied by the removal of Christian symbols in the area and the installation of a separating fence. The decree promulgated by Napoleon I on 23 Prairial, year XII would have allowed this last point, but the law of November 14, 1881, forbade it. The Jewish section was thus cleared of Christian ornaments and extended to 1,200 square meters, but was not surrounded by a fence. This section reached saturation in 1987, and the Town Hall granted 108 plots at the Cemetery Park to the Jewish community.

==== Protestant burial sites ====
The first Protestant (Calvinist) burial site was established in the early 17th century at the Saint-Cyric cemetery (Motte Saint-André), the former burial site of the Saint-Cyr-et-Sainte-Julitte church (at the current Argentré Street), which was demolished by Pierre Mauclerc in the 13th century. A new church, Saint-Léonard, was constructed with a new cemetery, while the old one was abandoned. In 1601, this location was allotted to the Protestant community despite vehement opposition from the Catholic parishioners, who were unwilling to relinquish control of this uncultivated land.

Following the issuance of the Edict of Nantes, three necropolises were designated for Protestants despite opposition. These included the Saint-Léonard cemetery at the base of the Motte Saint-André, another at the Couëron gate of Ville-Neuve (Marchix), and finally at Richebourg. The first was ultimately effective, while the other two were formally abolished. In 1655, the "cemetery of the Huguenots," or "cemetery of the executed," was established on the right bank of the Erdre, in the vicinity of the current Rue d'Orléans. On March 24, 1726, a royal edict by Louis XV required several cities, including Nantes, to construct an enclosed cemetery with a warden to oversee the interment of Protestant foreigners dying in France. Subsequently, the city of Nantes designated a plot in the Marchix district, near the "apothecary's garden," a location that was subsequently traversed by the extension of Mercœur Street in 1753. Thereafter, the Protestant section was incorporated into the current Miséricorde cemetery. Despite the stipulation in the law that the site was to be reserved for "foreigners of the so-called reformed religion," local Protestants were interred there, including those from neighboring parishes.

After the Revolution, an attempt was made to address the issue by requiring municipalities with residents of various faiths to create separate zones, as stipulated by Article 15 of the law of 23 Prairial, year XII. This legislation encountered considerable resistance from the predominantly Catholic population, which occasionally demonstrated a lack of acceptance towards the presence of Protestants. In a letter dated 1852, the Diocese of Nantes granted a temporary authorization to cross the Catholic section of the Miséricorde cemetery by Protestant funeral processions, provided that measures were taken to prevent them from crossing Catholic processions. In smaller municipalities, new cemeteries were entirely consecrated according to the Catholic rite. This resulted in some intractable situations, including that of Karatsch, a Protestant married to a Catholic, who was unable to be buried next to his wife and daughter because the entire cemetery was Catholic, thereby rendering it illegal to bury a Protestant there. In 1869, the body of Madame Tamelier, a Protestant, was retained in a shed for sixteen days due to the refusal of her relatives to bury her in the section designated for unbaptized children and suicides, the sole area accessible following the law. These issues culminated in the secularization of cemeteries in 1881, with the repeal of Article 15 of the law of 23 Prairial, year XII.

==== Muslim burial sites ====
Muslim graves are present in the military section of the Bouteillerie and among the graves of the victims of the 1943-1944 bombings in Nantes located in the Chauvinière cemetery. Some Muslim families, being of foreign origin, choose to transfer the bodies of their deceased to the country of their choice. In 2009, the cost of this type of transfer, which is highly regulated, ranged from €3,500 to €5,000. The financial responsibility for these costs falls on the families, the community, insurance companies, or the states. In the case of Tunisia and Turkey, the repatriation of their nationals' remains is covered. An increasing number of Muslims living in Nantes are French, sometimes for several generations, which has led to a reduction in the number of body transfers requested. Cemeteries are required to accommodate the deceased of all faiths. Two Muslim sections are available in Nantes: one at La Bouteillerie and the other at the Cemetery Park. By exemption, deceased Muslims from the Nantes metropolitan area can be buried there regardless of their residential district if it does not have a specific Muslim section.

=== Military cemeteries ===
During the 1870 war, German prisoners who had sustained injuries were transferred to Nantes. Five of them succumbed to their injuries and were buried in the Protestant section of the Miséricorde cemetery. Since their burial, these graves have been relocated to the same area.

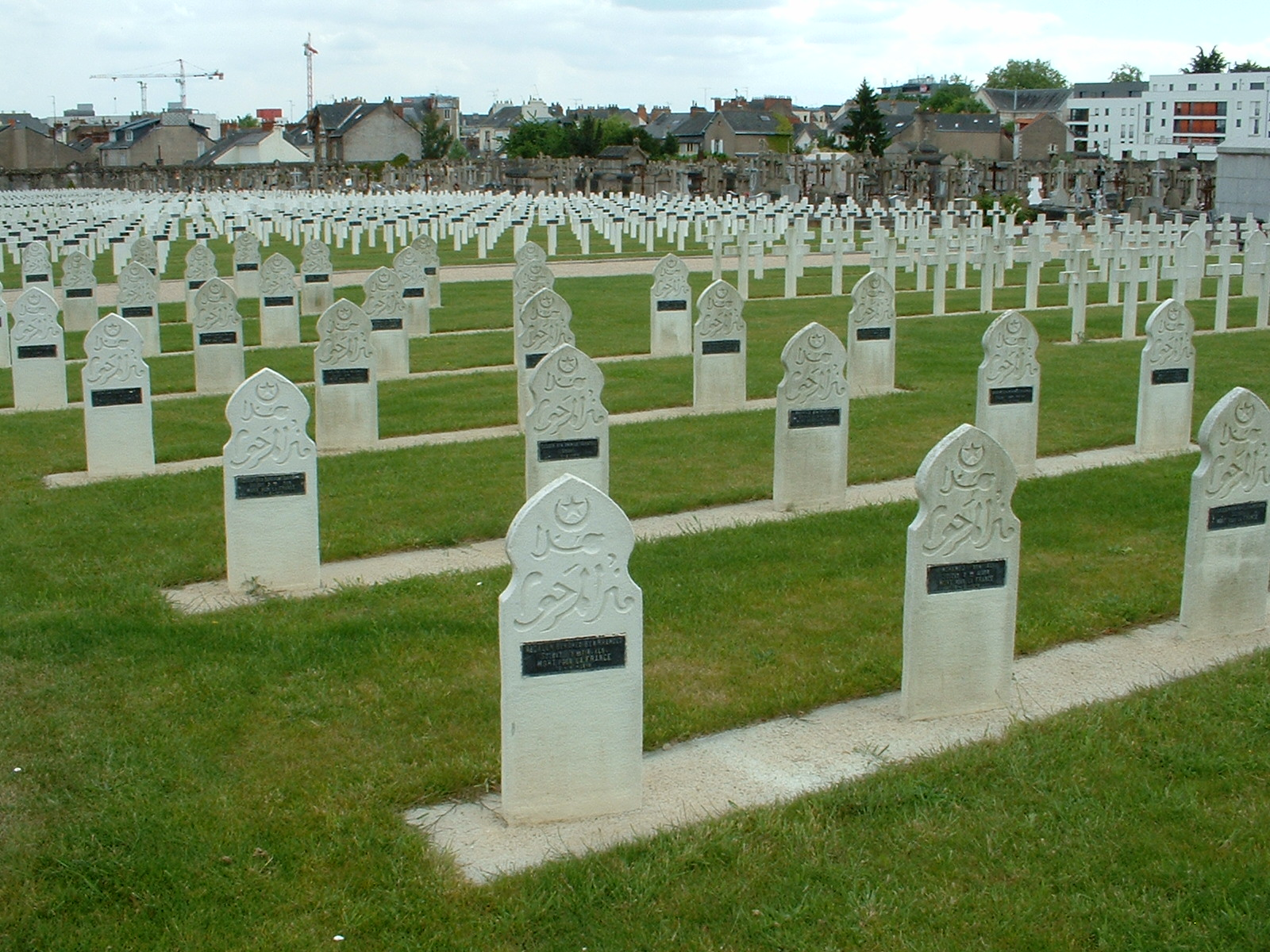

During World War I, German prisoners of war were employed in various works in the Nantes region to compensate for the labor shortage resulting from mobilization. Those who died were buried in the La Bouteillerie cemetery, in a zone adjoining the French military section. This section was authorized on October 31, 1918. It received the bodies of Allied soldiers who died in Nantes hospitals, as the city was a major evacuation center for the wounded. A total of 1,522 soldiers are interred in this cemetery. The graves are arranged in a geometric pattern, with the only distinction being the white headstones that indicate religious affiliation (crosses for Christians, steles with a crescent and a five-pointed star for Muslims, and steles with the Star of David for Jews). To be designated as having "Died for France," a soldier must have died on the battlefield or from an illness contracted in service. In Nantes, 339 military graves lack this designation. Émile Bouillard, who died in Nantes in 1916, was granted the designation "Died for France" 90 years after his burial following a medical commission's report.

Following the conclusion of the war, the French government facilitated the repatriation of the remains of fallen soldiers to their respective communities at state expense. Requests for the return of remains were submitted to the army's civil registry, and the bodies were transported to Nantes by rail. Between 1919 and 1926, 76 convoys carrying 770 soldiers passed through Nantes, serving as a departmental hub. Two hundred of these soldiers were interred in the Miséricorde cemetery.

During World War II, the bodies of soldiers, prisoners of war, resistance fighters, members of the FFI, those executed by the Germans, and those who died from deportation or imprisonment were buried in the Chauvinière cemetery. Later, the dead from the Indochina and Algeria wars, as well as bodies transferred from the graves of soldiers buried in Nantes cemeteries whose concessions had expired, were buried there. In the Pont du Cens cemetery, a military section contains the graves of 112 British airmen killed during World War II, and a stele has been erected in memory of the French buried overseas.

== Active cemeteries in Nantes ==
The cemeteries in Nantes each have unique histories. Saint-Donatien is the oldest and final resting place of the city's patron saints. La Bouteillerie, Miséricorde, and Saint-Jacques emerged around the time of the Revolution and are among the first modern cemeteries. The outlying parishes of Sainte-Anne and Saint-Joseph-de-Porterie established their cemeteries. The independent municipalities of Chantenay-sur-Loire (Saint-Clair and Saint-Martin) and Doulon (Toutes-Aides and Vieux-Doulon) have cemeteries with their histories. In more recent times, the Pont du Cens cemetery was established just before World War II, followed by La Chauvinière, created to accommodate the victims of the bombings in Nantes, and finally, the Cemetery Park in March 1979.

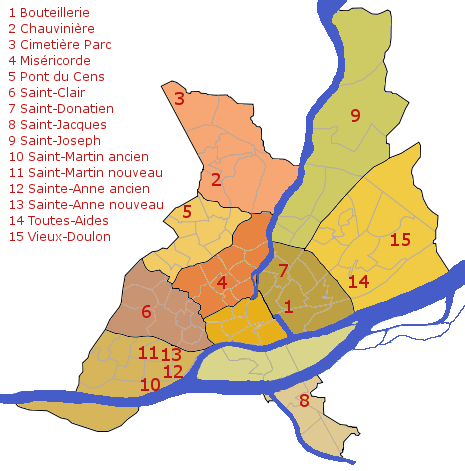
Map of Nantes cemeteries

The following cemeteries are presented in alphabetical order, with the preceding number indicating their location on the city map.

1. La Bouteillerie;
2. Chauvinière;
3. Cimetière Parc;
4. Miséricorde;
5. Pont du Cens;
6. Saint-Clair;
7. Saint-Donatien;
8. Saint-Jacques;
9. Saint-Joseph-de-Porterie;
10. Saint-Martin ancien;
11. Saint-Martin nouveau;
12. Sainte-Anne ancien;
13. Sainte-Anne nouveau;
14. Toutes-Aides;
15. Vieux-Doulon.

=== La Bouteillerie cemetery ===
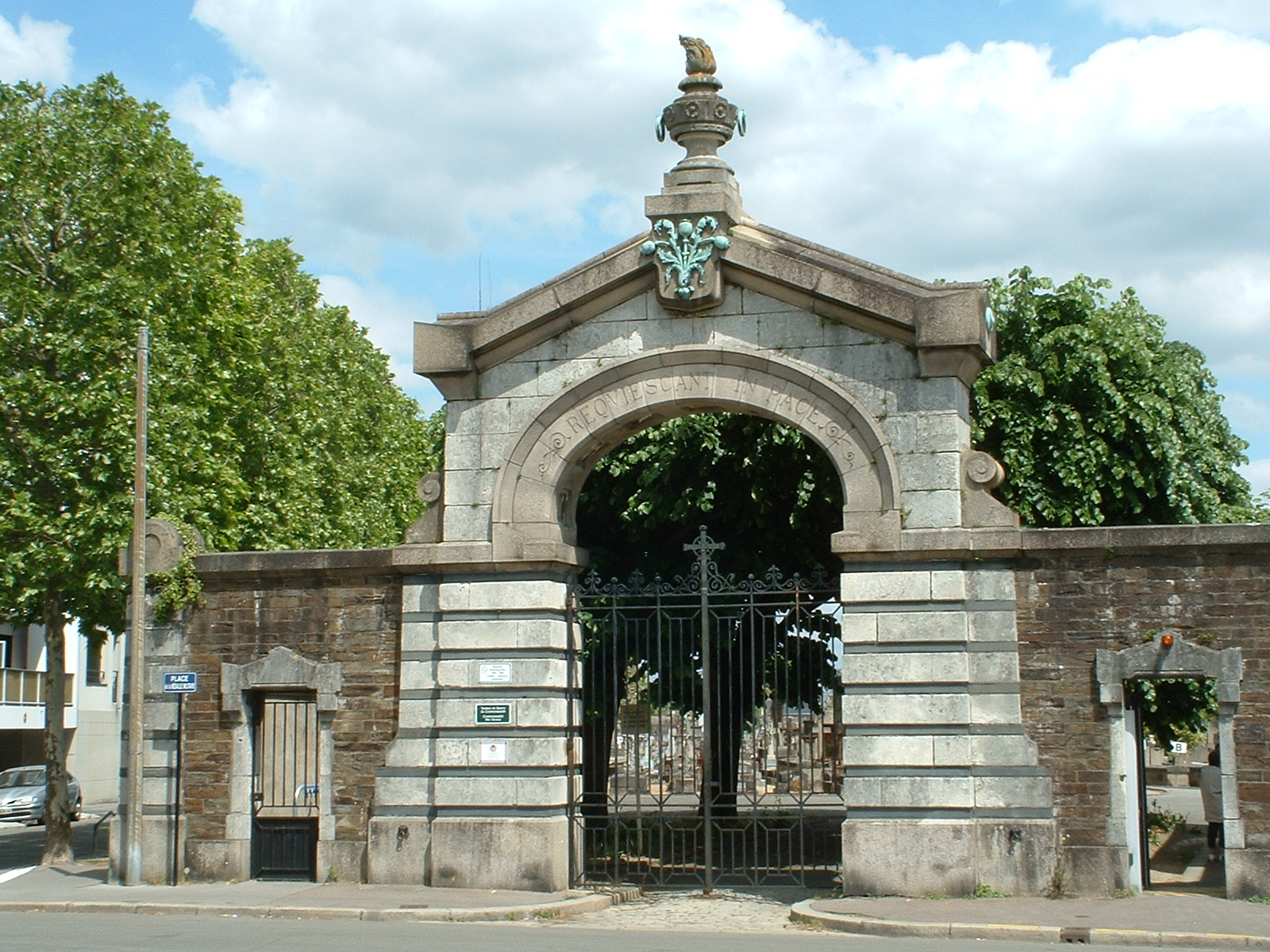
Cemetery entrance

"Bouteillerie" is derived from the site's historical activity during the Middle Ages, when it was owned by the Bishop of Nantes. The bishop had vineyards and cellars on the property, and the wine was bottled on-site, hence the name "Bouteillerie." The land was sold by Bishop Daniel Vigier in 1320 and subsequently owned by the family of the Marquise de Sévigné in 1523, Christophe Vavasseur in 1554, and the Coutances family. In the 17th century, the Carthusians acquired it. In 1774, the property was purchased by the parishes of Saint-Clément, Sainte-Croix, Saint-Denis, Saint-Laurent, Saint-Léonard, Sainte-Radegonde, Saint-Vincent, and the collegiate church of Notre-Dame to serve as their common cemetery, as decreed by King Louis XVI's Council of State.

To the north of Saint-Clément Church was a cemetery, called Saint-Clément or Champ-Fleuri cemetery, which dated back to at least the 15th century. This was the burial ground for the Catholic families of the parish. With the creation of La Bouteillerie cemetery, the entrance gate from Champ-Fleuri was transferred there. This gate was topped with a sculpture of a ship: a brigantine carved in stone. (Note: The source uses "brigandin," likely in error.) The cemetery was originally named Grand Brigandin about the aforementioned sculpture. However, the gate has since been lost, and the name was subsequently replaced by "La Bouteillerie."

In 1809, a study determined that the 10,500 square meters cemetery was sufficient for the needs of the three parishes utilizing it. However, by 1832, the town hall expressed concern about the usual problems of space limitations, noting that plots were reused before bodies had fully decomposed. In response, the municipality increased La Bouteillerie's area by 65 ares through land exchange. In 1890, an additional 15,000 square meters were acquired, with Mayor Ernest Guibourd de Luzinais forecasting that this would be the final expansion, sufficient "for this part of the city." However, in 1898, Nantes added another 6,700 square meters to allow for future expansion.

The historical context of the First World War had a profound impact on the structure of La Bouteillerie. Between 1914 and 1919, the cemetery was used to bury soldiers who had died in military hospitals in Nantes during World War I. In 1918, 2,500 square meters of La Bouteillerie were dedicated to creating a military cemetery, with 1,533 graves installed. To compensate for the used space, the city purchased 7,739 square meters of neighboring land, part of which was devoted to the cemetery, thus bringing the total area to approximately 6 hectares.

The graves of several noteworthy individuals are also present, including Ange Guépin, Camille Mellinet, René Guy Cadou, (Note: Kahn & Landais 1990, p. 220) Augustin Darbefeuille, Jules Grandjouan, Hippolyte Dubois, Marie-Alphonse Bedeau, Évariste Colombel, Georges-Évariste Colombel, Léa Papin, Armel de Wismes, and César Jules Decré.

=== La Chauvinière cemetery ===
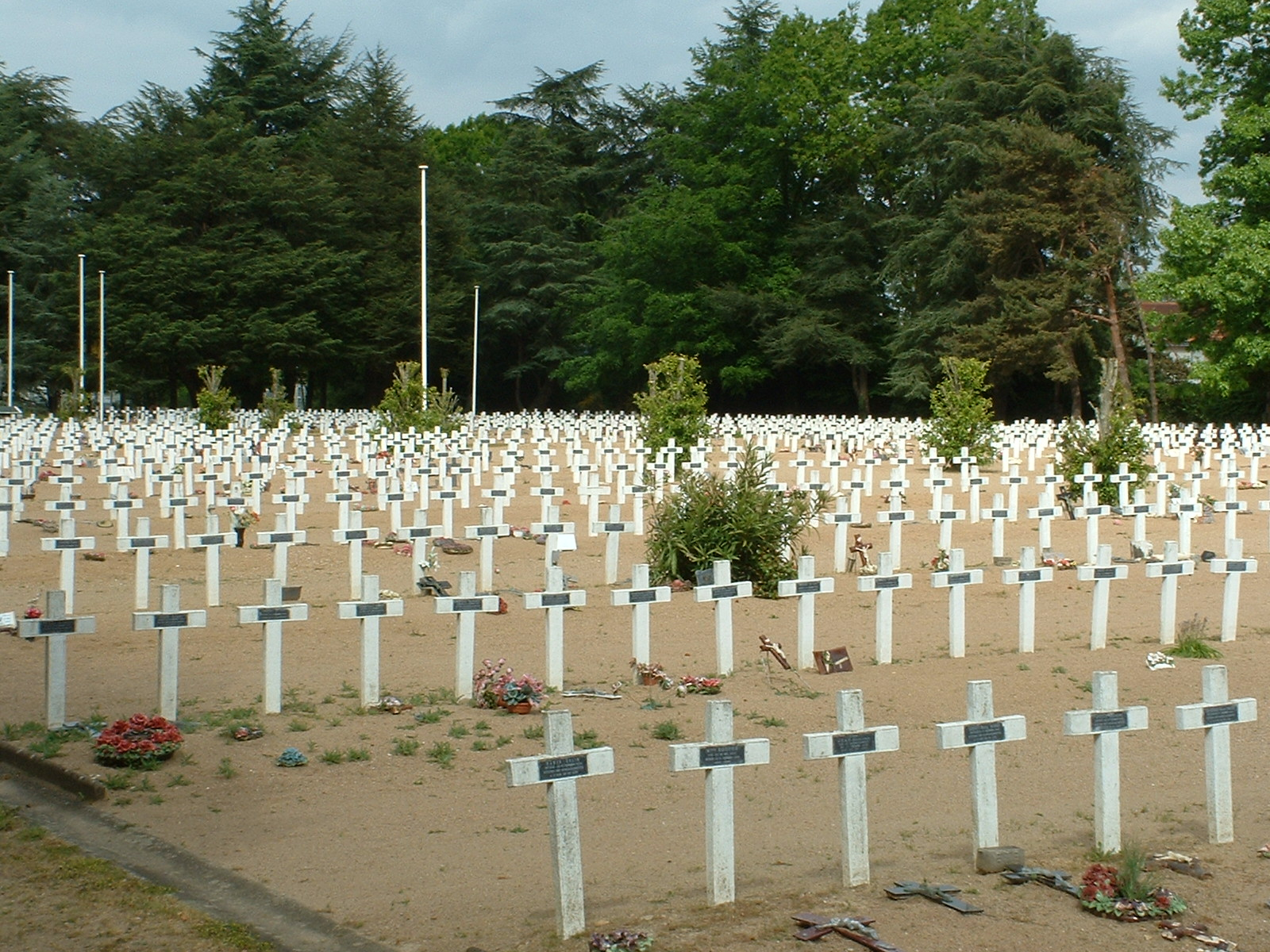
General view of La Chauvinière cemetery.

In 1934, the municipal authorities of Nantes purchased a 12,490 square meters plot of land. The site was originally intended to be part of a large necropolis, but the project was never fully realized. On September 16 and 23, 1943, allied bombings resulted in the deaths of approximately 1,500 individuals and injuries to 3,000 others. The administration opted to utilize the La Chauvinière land for the interment of the deceased. A total of 1,433 graves were excavated by two hundred young people from the Allier youth camps. Funeral ceremonies were conducted simultaneously in all churches and at the Museum of Fine Arts (for a civil ceremony). Thereafter, the processions embarked on their lengthy journey to La Chauvinière, which was at the time a vacant lot cluttered with excavation tools.

Following the conclusion of World War II, the grave of André Le Moal, one of those executed in retaliation for Karl Hotz's death, was relocated to La Chauvinière. On October 22, 1941, Le Moal was interred, along with five other hostages, in the Haute-Goulaine cemetery, situated to the southeast of Nantes.

In the cemetery, a monument consisting of a granite block with soil from Buchenwald embedded in it was inaugurated in 1950. The remains of soldiers, prisoners of war, deportees, resistance fighters, FFI members, those executed by the Germans, or victims of deportation or imprisonment were interred alongside the bombing victims. Subsequently, those who perished in the Indochina and Algeria wars, as well as bodies transferred from the graves of soldiers interred in Nantes cemeteries whose concessions had expired, were interred in La Chauvinière.

=== Miséricorde cemetery ===
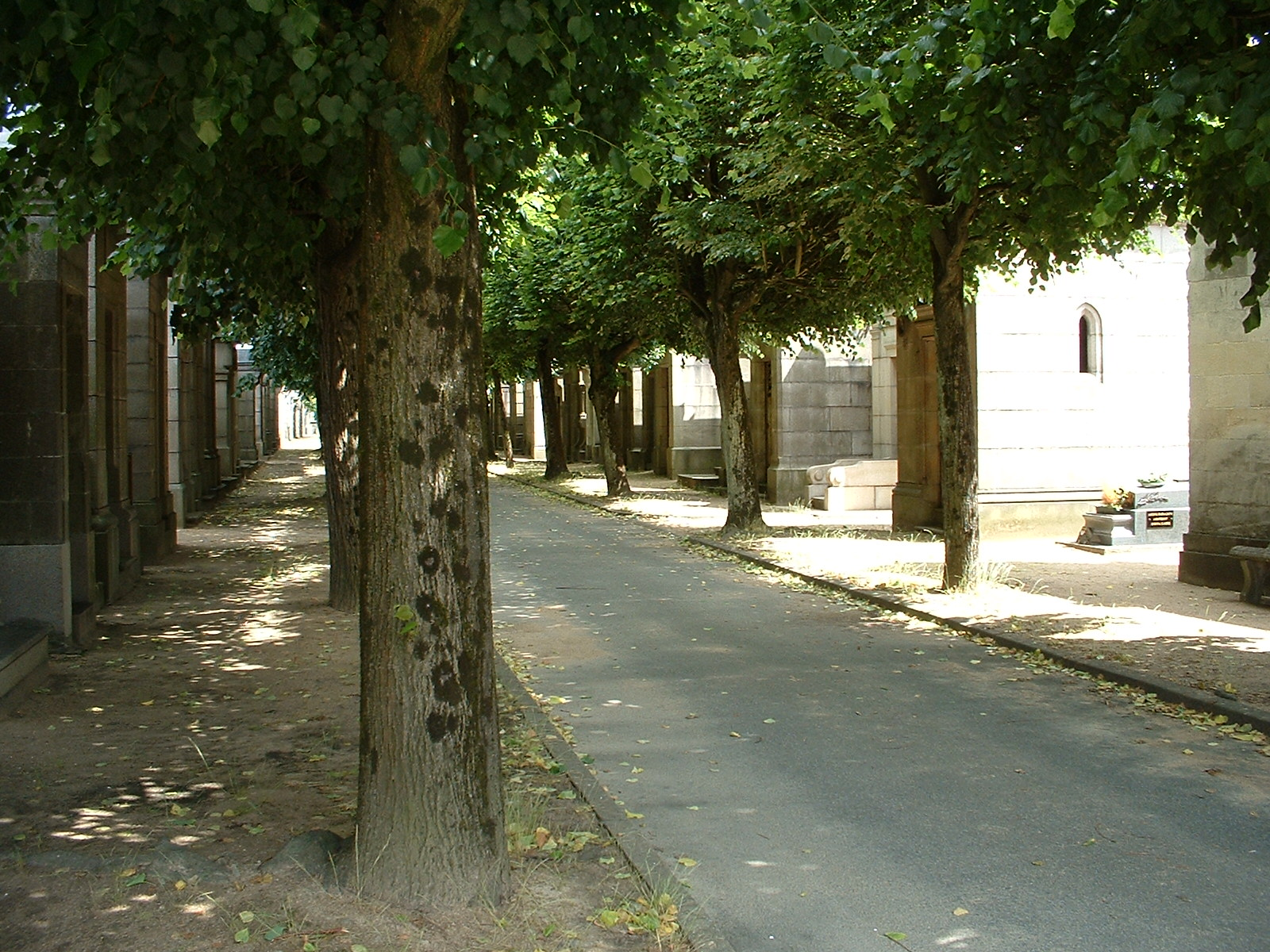
Miséricorde cemetery: central alley.

The cemetery is colloquially known as the "Père-Lachaise of Nantes" in the 21st century. It is situated along an alley lined with cypress and lime trees and contains approximately sixty neo-Gothic mausoleums. These mausoleums house the deceased from prominent Nantes families. There are 16,000 tombs distributed throughout the cemetery from the beginning of the records in 1793 until 2010.

In 1791, the municipality of Nantes purchased the market gardening land of Miséricorde, which was named after the chapel founded in 1026 and which depended on the Saint-Similien parish. Miséricorde Cemetery was established on this land to accommodate the deceased from the parishes of Notre Dame, Saint-Nicolas, and Saint-Similien. The first burial took place in 1793.

The cemetery was devastated during the War in the Vendée but was later revived a few years later. The cemetery was equipped with a boundary wall and a wooden gate designed by architect Mathurin Peccot in 1803. In 1816, an expansion was made possible by acquiring a 3,600 square meters plot. From 1830 onwards, the town hall increased the cemetery's area by two-thirds. In 1837, the cemetery was considered "the most beautiful" in Nantes, prompting the municipal council to provide a monumental gate at the entrance on rue du Bourget, in line with Auvours Streets.

In December 1847, the surveyor-architect Henri-Théodore Driollet proposed the creation of a new necropolis "far from any habitation" on rue Noire. The Loire-Inférieure prefecture subsequently authorized another expansion on an adjacent plot, where 36,000 square meters were developed. Subsequently, in January 1890, the municipality, under the direction of Charles Lechat, undertook a further expansion of the cemetery, encompassing an additional 27,000 square meters. This brought the total area of Miséricorde Cemetery to nearly 9 hectares.

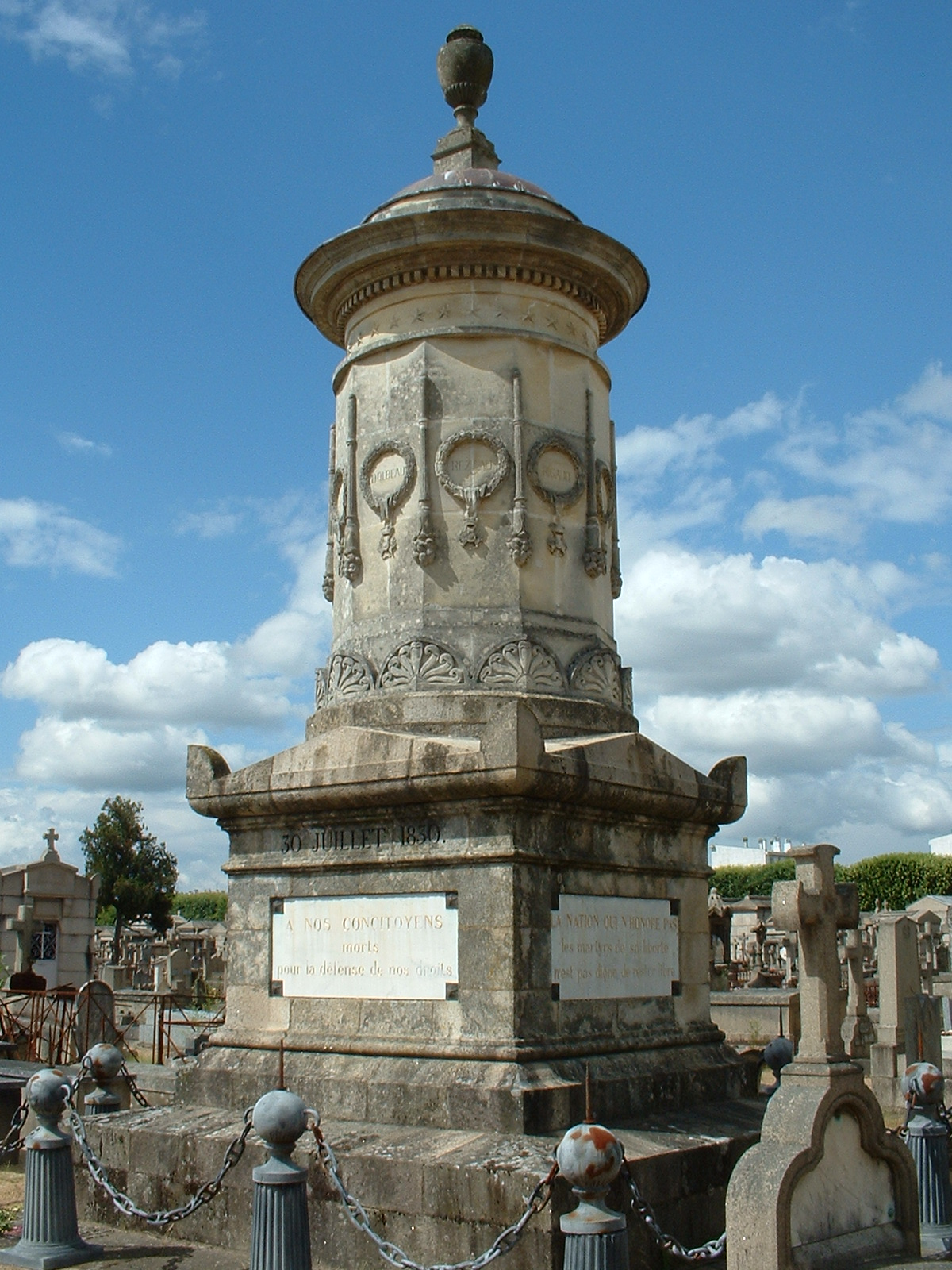
Monument to the dead of 1830.

The oldest section of the cemetery, situated to the left of the main entrance, encompasses the Jewish and Protestant cemeteries. Before the 1870s, the Jewish section was integrated into the Protestant section. Following the designation of an area reserved for Jewish burials, these graves have gradually disappeared. As of September 2009, only one remaining grave, that of chocolatier Godefroy Goldstein (1794–1844), remained.

A mausoleum was constructed in memory of ten residents of Nantes who were killed by the troops on July 30, 1830, during a demonstration in Place Louis-XVI (now Maréchal-Foch Square). The bronze bust adorning the grave of Philippe Gengembre (1764–1838), a French chemist and inventor, was created by the sculptor Étienne Nicolas Édouard Suc (1807–1855). A monument was erected on the grave of Alexandre Fourny, one of the 48 hostages executed after Lieutenant Colonel Hotz's death.

Among the well-known names inscribed on the Miséricorde tombstones are: The following individuals are among those commemorated on the Miséricorde tombstones: Guist'hau, Ceineray, Chenantais, Livet, Mellinet, Cambronne, Mangin (founder of the Phare de la Loire), Bellamy, Cassegrain, Decré, Dubigeon, Grandjouan, and Lefèvre-Utile. One might also consider the following individuals: René Waldeck-Rousseau, the Dobrée family, Jules-Élie Delaunay, Jean Simon Voruz, the parents and sister of Jules Verne, Louis Pommeraye (the initiator of the construction of Passage Pommeraye), Léon Jost, and Alexandre Fourny.

=== Parc cemetery ===
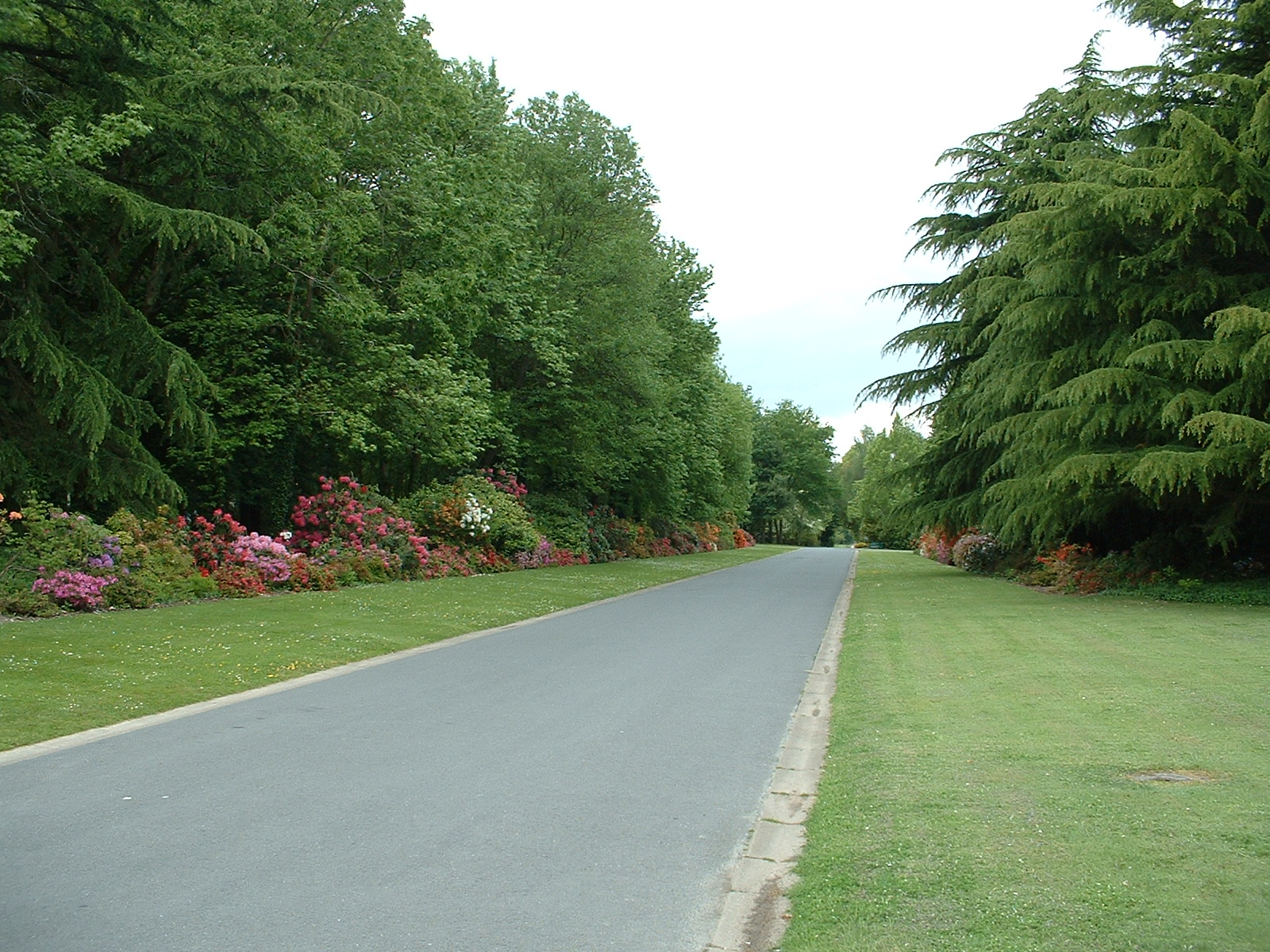
Asphalt path.

In 1942, the municipality of Nantes was confronted with the challenge of overcrowding in its fourteen cemeteries. With a total area of 30 hectares, 28 hectares were occupied. A proposed project would create a vast burial site and close all old necropolises except Saint-Jacques and Toutes-Aides. The finalized plan in 1945 envisioned opening a 200-hectare cemetery, six times the existing capacity. The proposed expansion of the cemetery was to be located on land in Nantes, Treillères, and La Chapelle-sur-Erdre. The plan, formulated by Charles Friesé, an architect and director of Nantes' architecture service, was declared a public utility by the Ministry of the Interior in 1948.

By 1953, 100 hectares had been acquired. The initial project was not fully realized due to other developments. These included a 16-hectare sports field in Basses-Landes, the A11 highway and an interchange spanning 15 hectares, and the Bruyères HLM and a summer camp on 4 hectares. The boundaries of the Parc Cemetery were set in 1974, covering 84 hectares. Some cemeteries were reduced to 62 in Nantes, 19 in La Chapelle-sur-Erdre, and 3 in Treillères. This reduction was partly because, contrary to the initial idea, the fourteen other Nantes cemeteries remained active.

The Parc Cemetery's inaugural interment was that of Charles Friesé, the cemetery's architect, in March 1979. Initially, burials were confined to a 50-hectare area.

Currently, the cemetery has evolved into a landscaped park comprising over 11,000 trees and shrubs, functioning as an arboretum. Graves are dispersed in nature, eschewing the conventional practice of continuous rows of marble tombstones. Instead of individual graves, long trenches with prefabricated reinforced concrete vaults were utilized. The installations were conducted in square sections. In 1987, 108 spaces were reserved for the Jewish community due to the saturation of the Jewish section in the Miséricorde Cemetery. Over its first decade, nearly 3,000 graves were allocated, and approximately 300 communal burials were conducted.

The cemetery is the site of Nantes' crematorium, constructed for eight months beginning in 1988. The number of cremations conducted at the facility increased from 352 in 1989, the year of its inauguration, to 2,272 in 2011.

Steps in the creation of a pathway

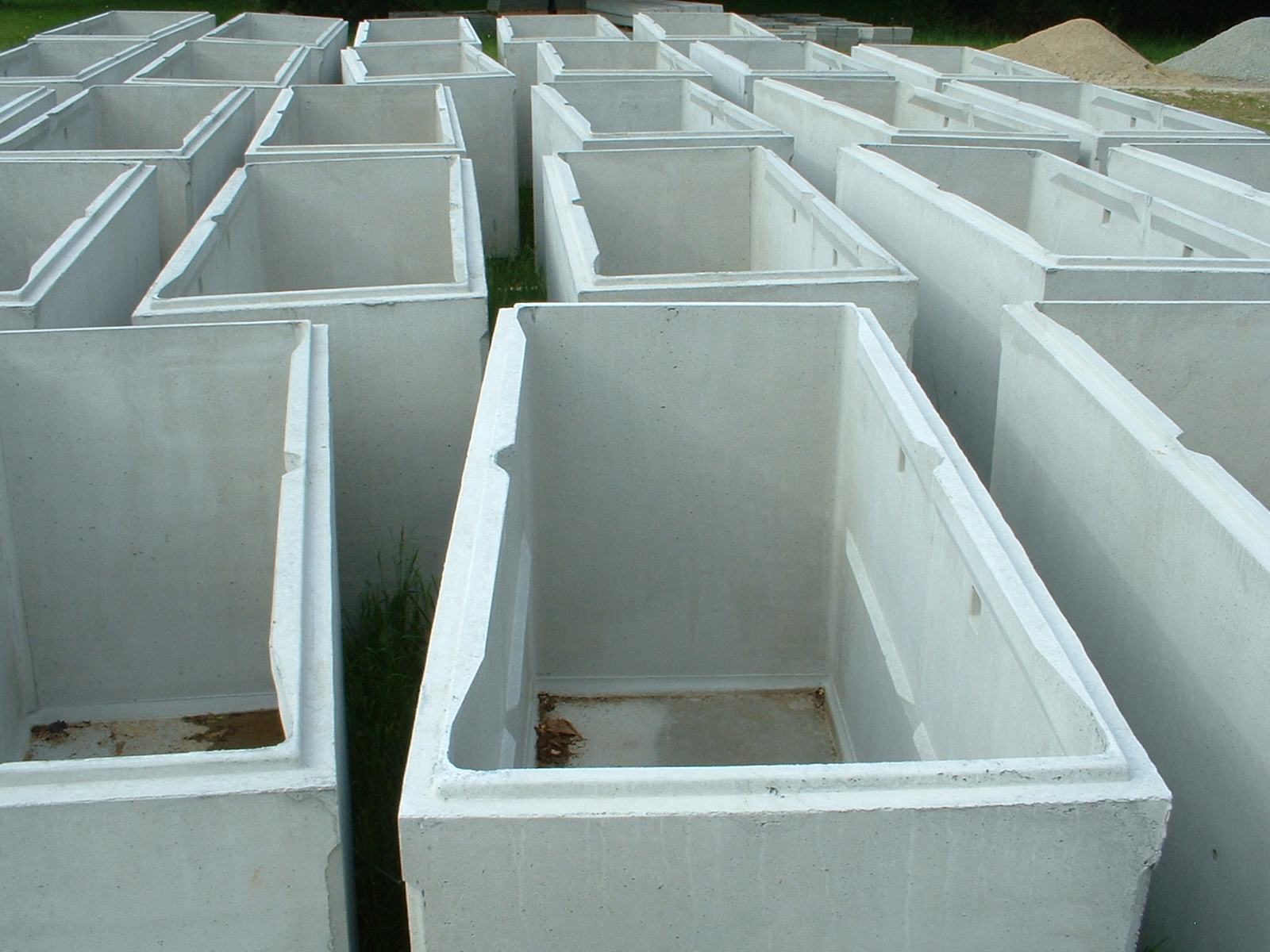
Prefabricated vaults.

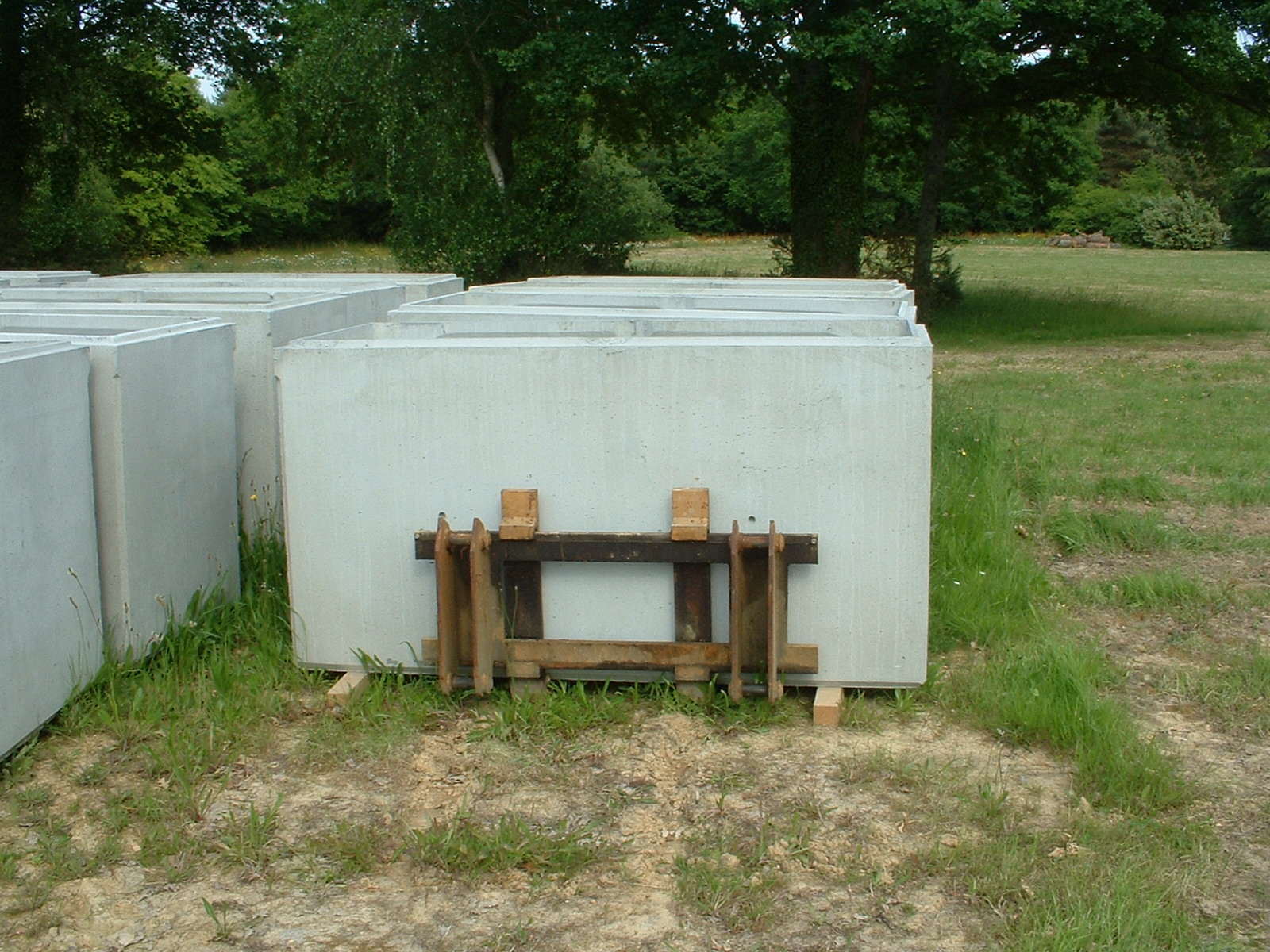
Vault height: 1.20 m.

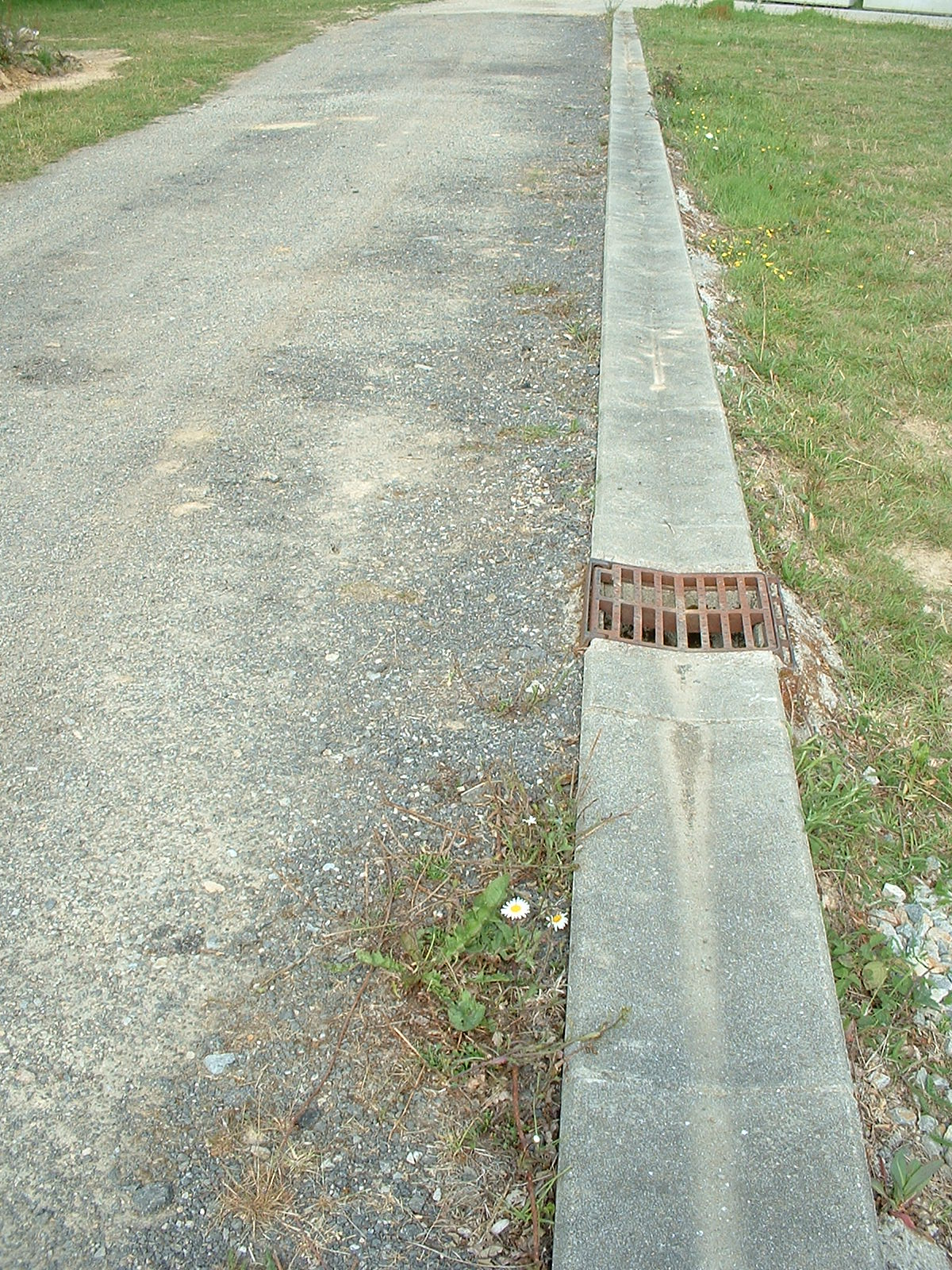
Installation of drainage for a plot.

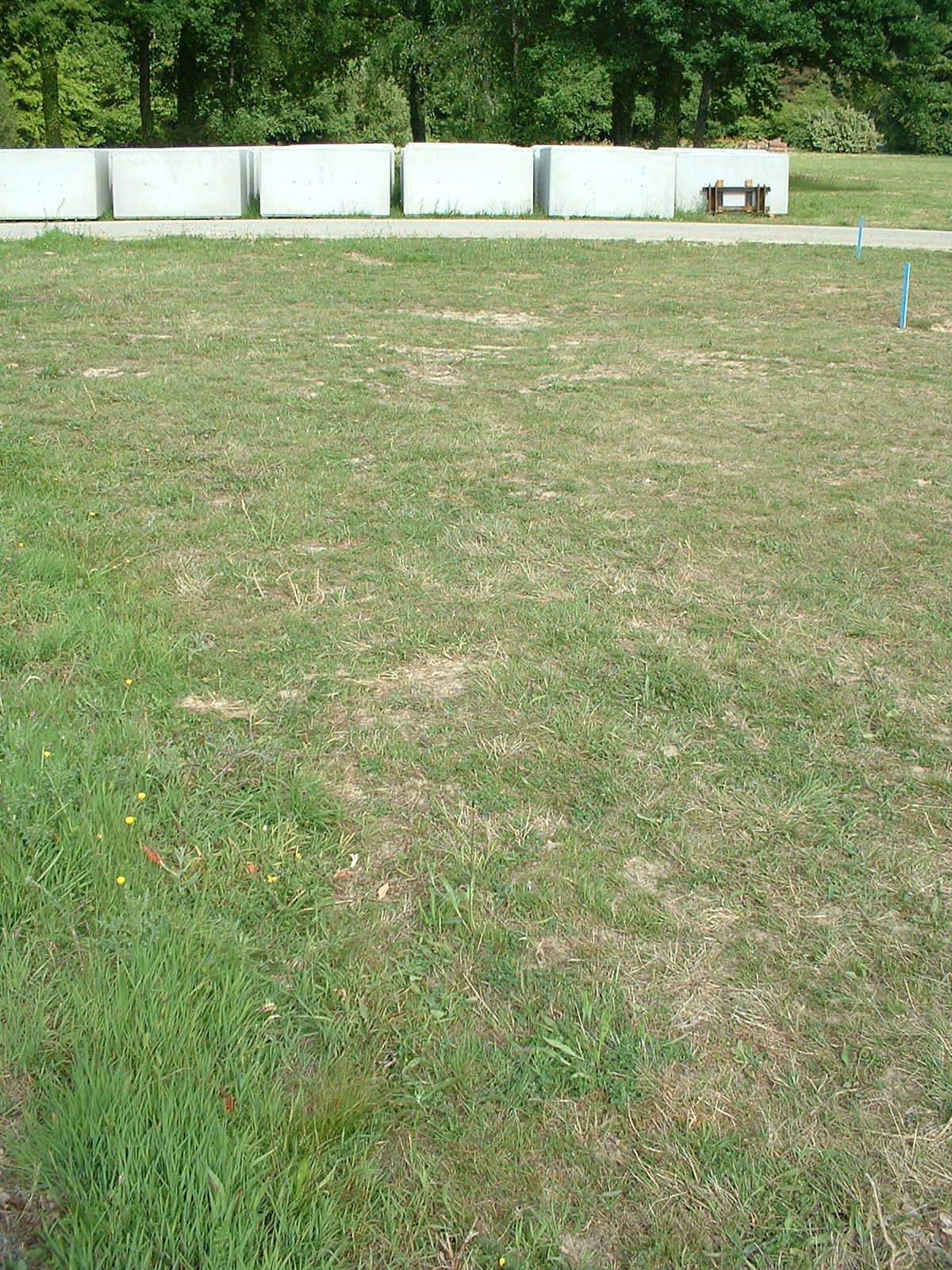
Plot in its natural state before use.

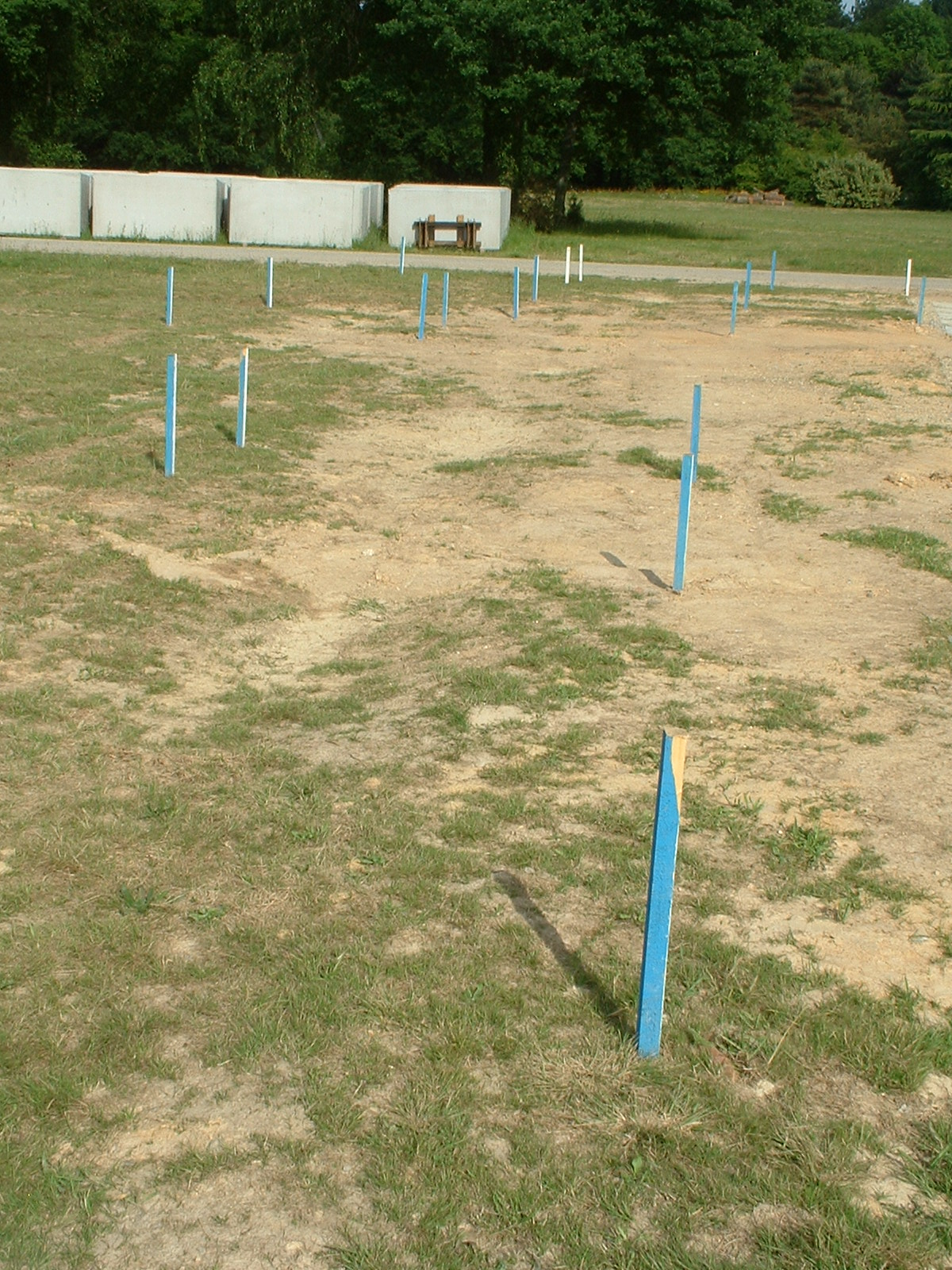
Plot demarcation.

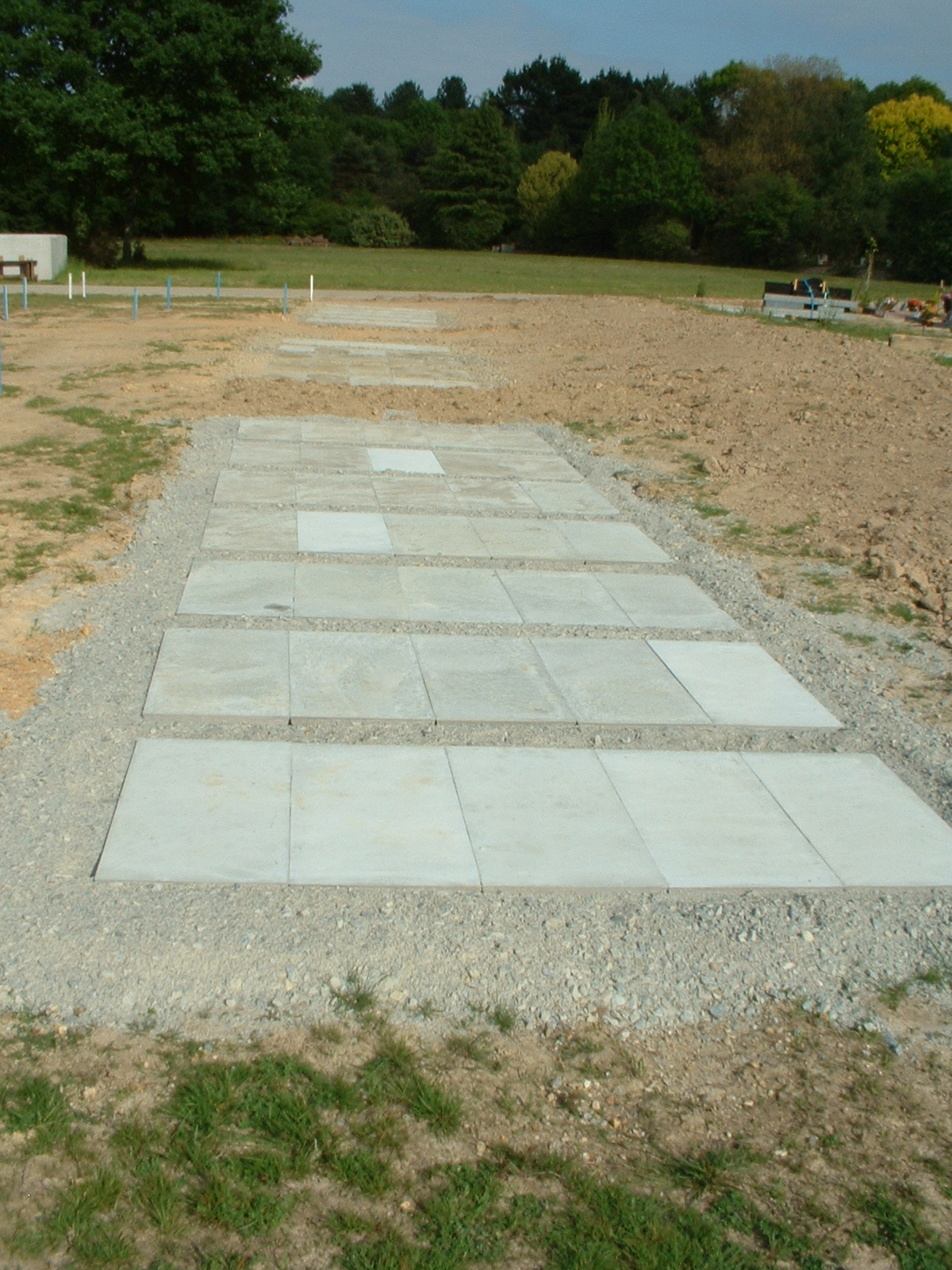
Vault burial.

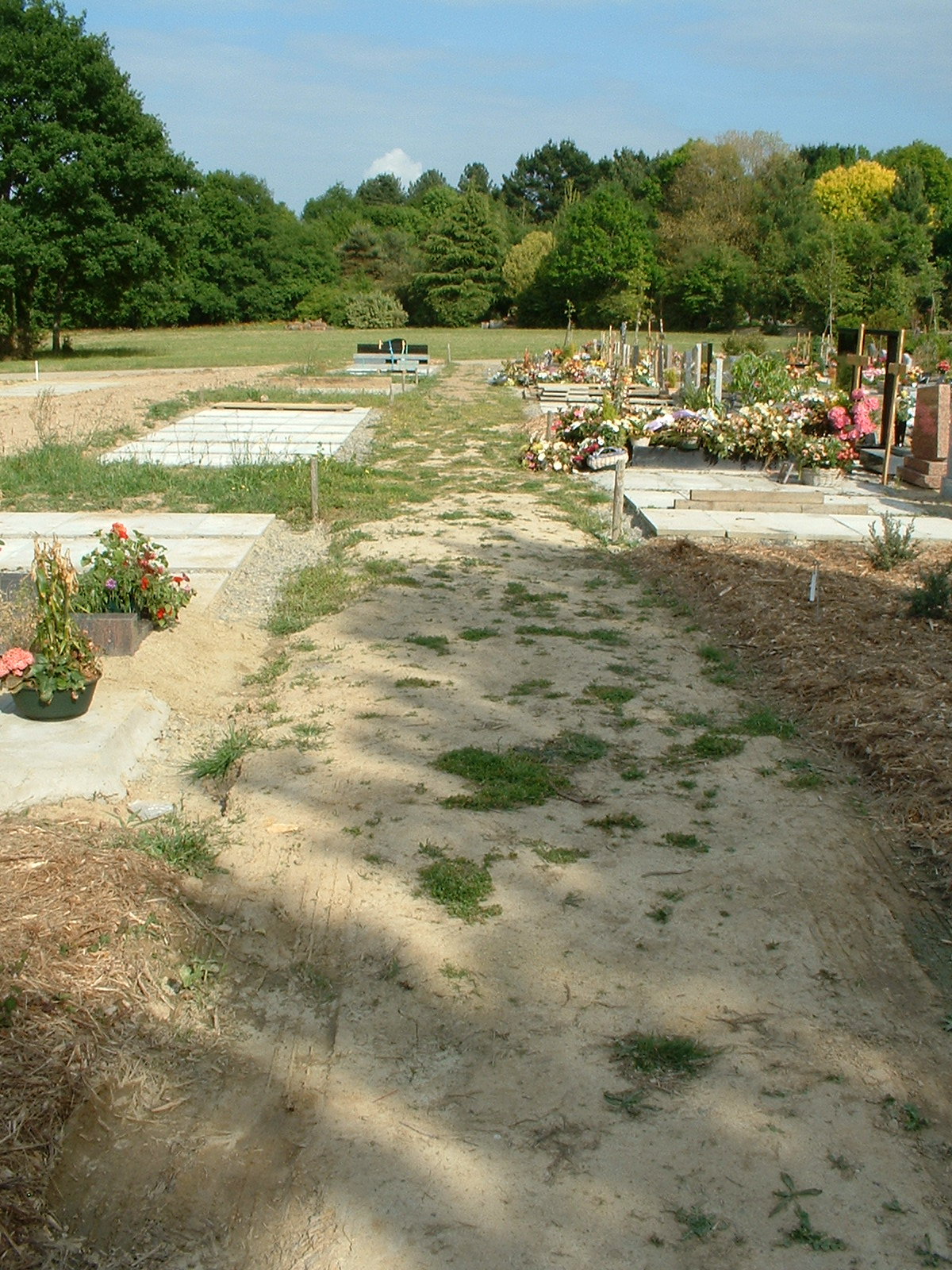
First burials.

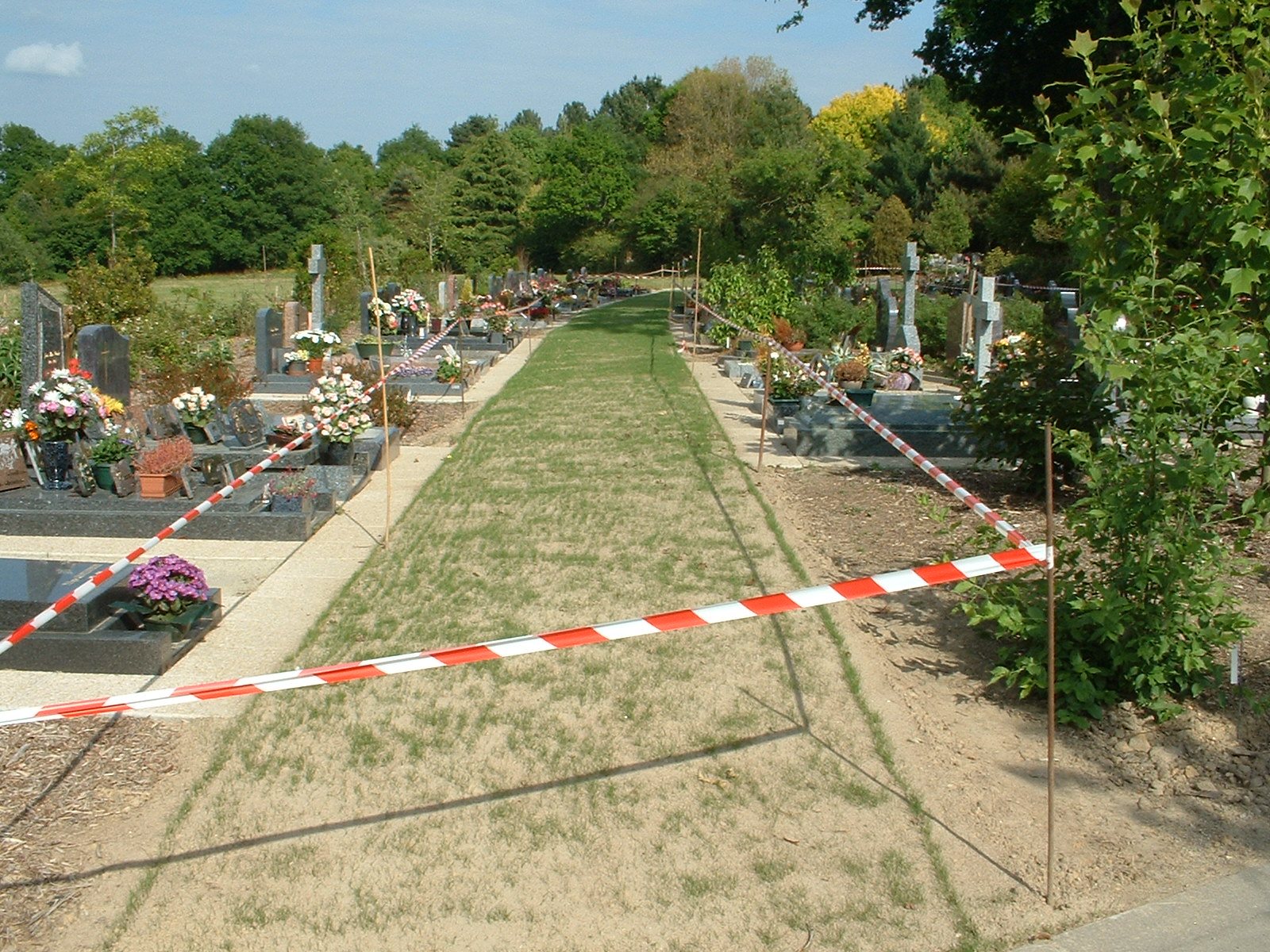
Pathway finishing: turfing.

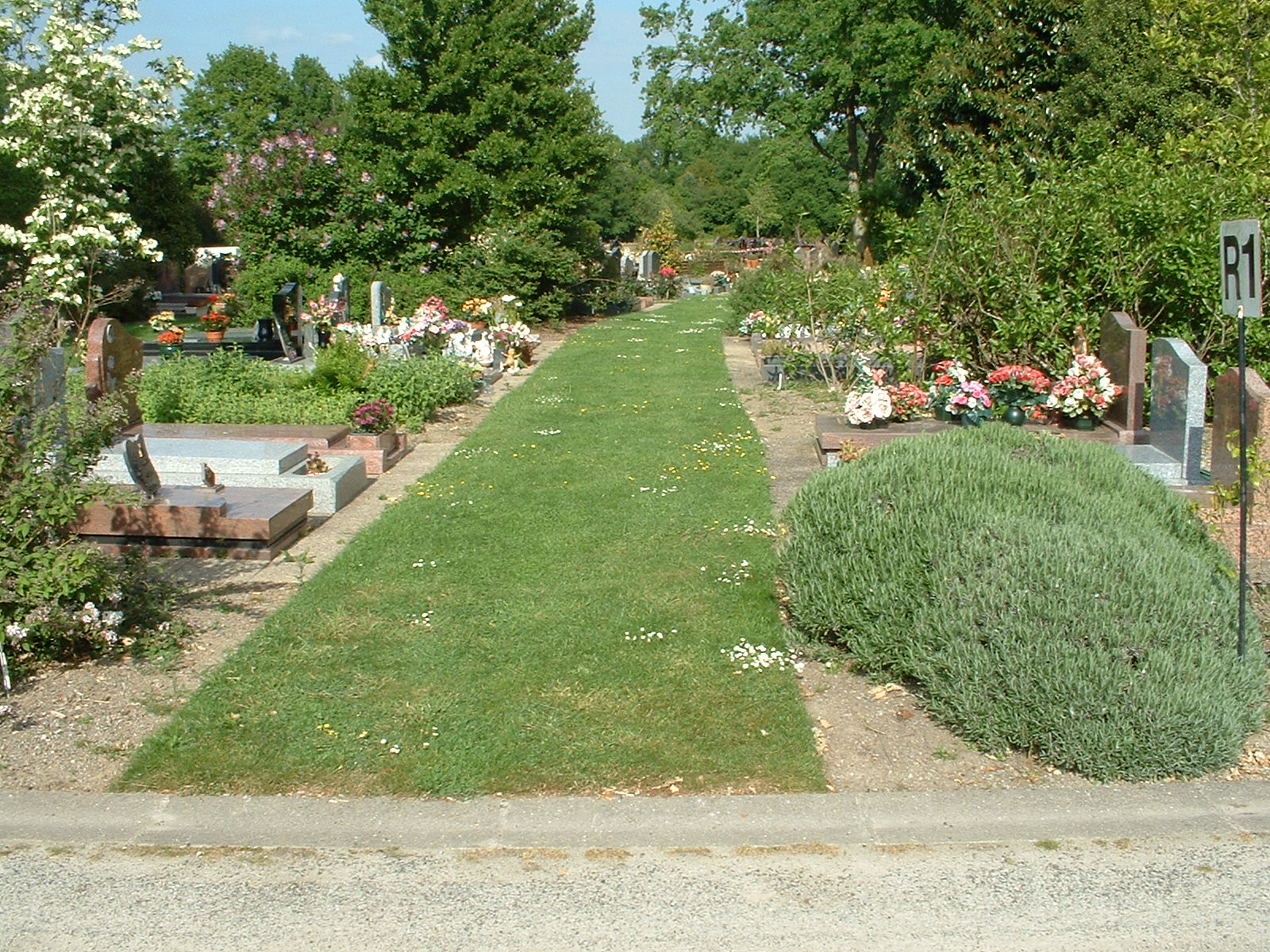
Fully completed and landscaped pathway.

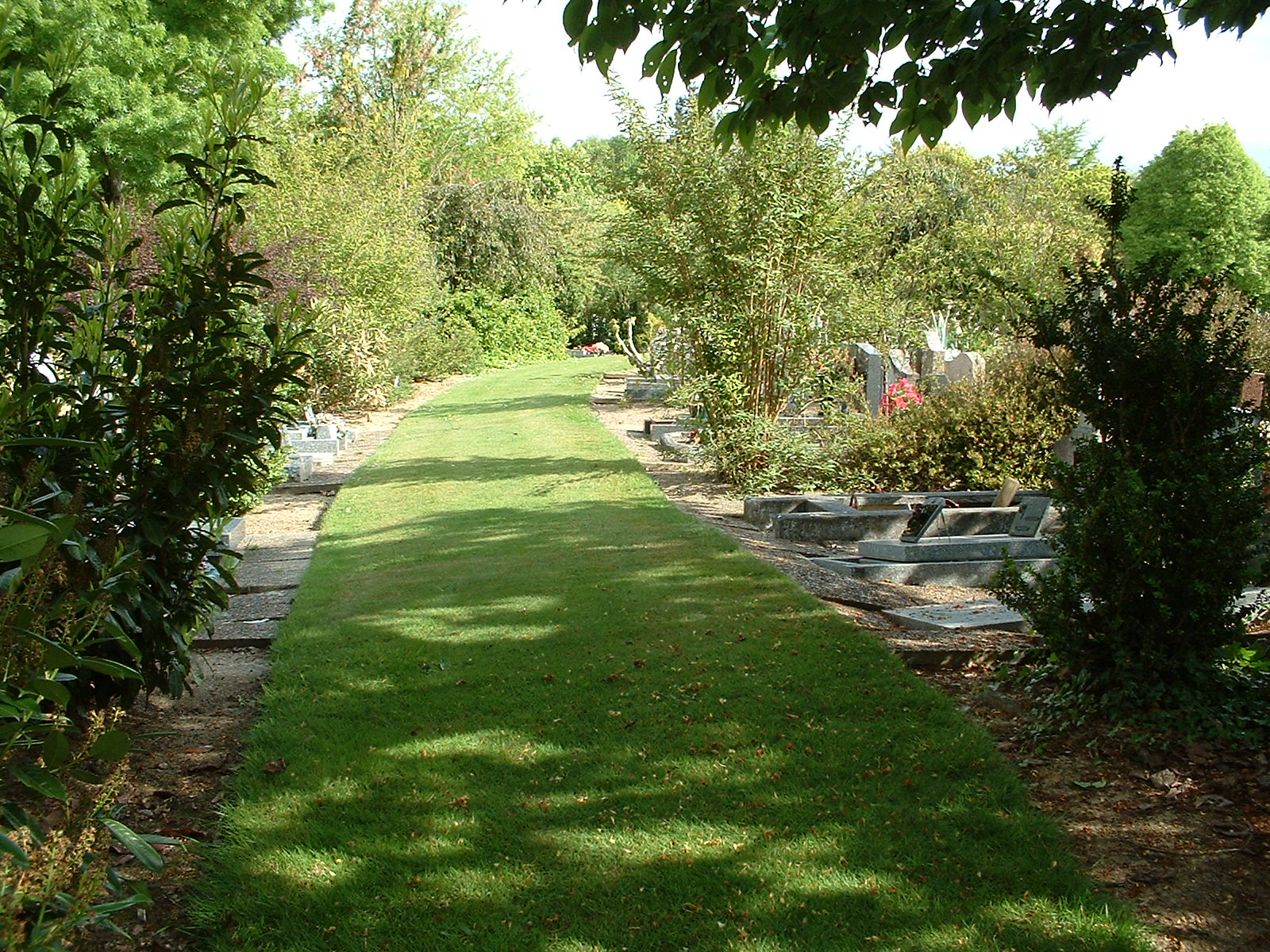
Matured pathway.

=== Pont du Cens cemetery ===
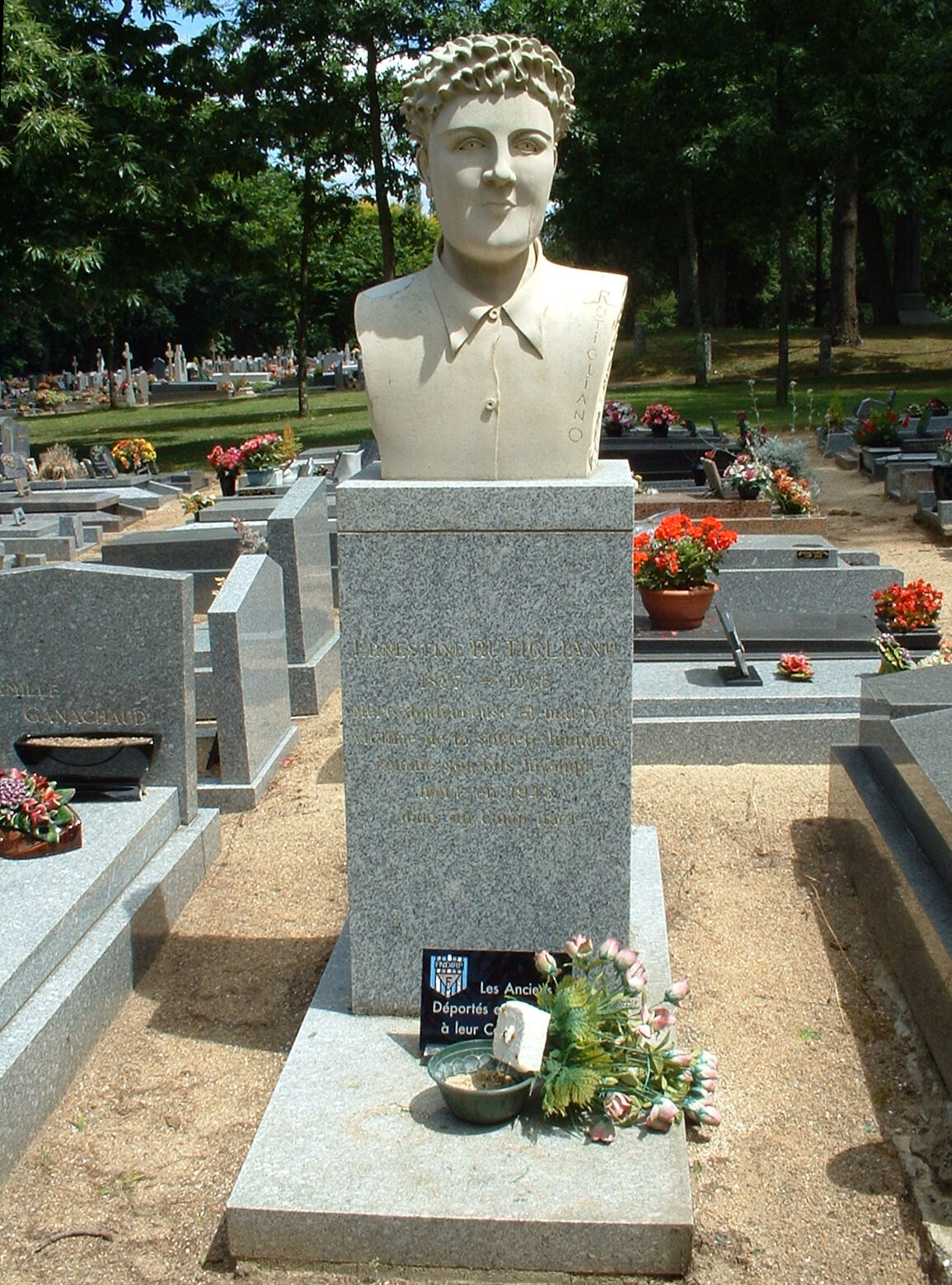
Bust of Libertaire Rutigliano on his mother's grave

Following a municipal council decision on February 3, 1936, the Nantes municipality purchased land belonging to the Belot family (owners of the Château de la Gaudinière) and Mr. Batie. Mr. Belot expressed concerns about the nature of the boundary fence. The city explored legal options and, for cost-saving reasons, considered a metal mesh fence with a hedge and a 2.50-meter-high concrete block wall. The cemetery has retained a significant amount of woodland from the original site.

Following his assassination by resistance fighters on October 20, 1941, Nantes' Feldkommandant Karl Hotz was interred in the city four days later. He was subsequently transferred to the Pornichet German military cemetery. A military section contains the graves of 112 British airmen killed during World War II. Another monument commemorates French individuals buried overseas. In 1968, Nantes committed to maintaining this monument, as perpetual concessions were prohibited.

On June 26, 1956, four mummies estimated to be approximately 3,000 years old were interred in the Pont du Cens cemetery ossuary. The mummies had been transported from Egypt in the early 19th century by Nantes scientist Frédéric Caillaud and had degraded to the point that burial was necessary. According to Vincent Buche from Le Point, the museum staff's primary concern was the supposed curse they believed to be associated with the mummies.

The cemetery also contains the tomb of Ernestine Rutigliano (1897–1965), which is adorned with the bust of her son, Libertaire Rutigliano (1921–1945). The latter was a resistance fighter who died in deportation and was posthumously awarded the Croix de Guerre. He is commemorated in the naming of a college in Nantes. The tomb of Jean Rouxel (1935–1998), a chemist and CNRS Gold Medalist in 1997, also resides here.

=== Saint-Clair cemetery ===
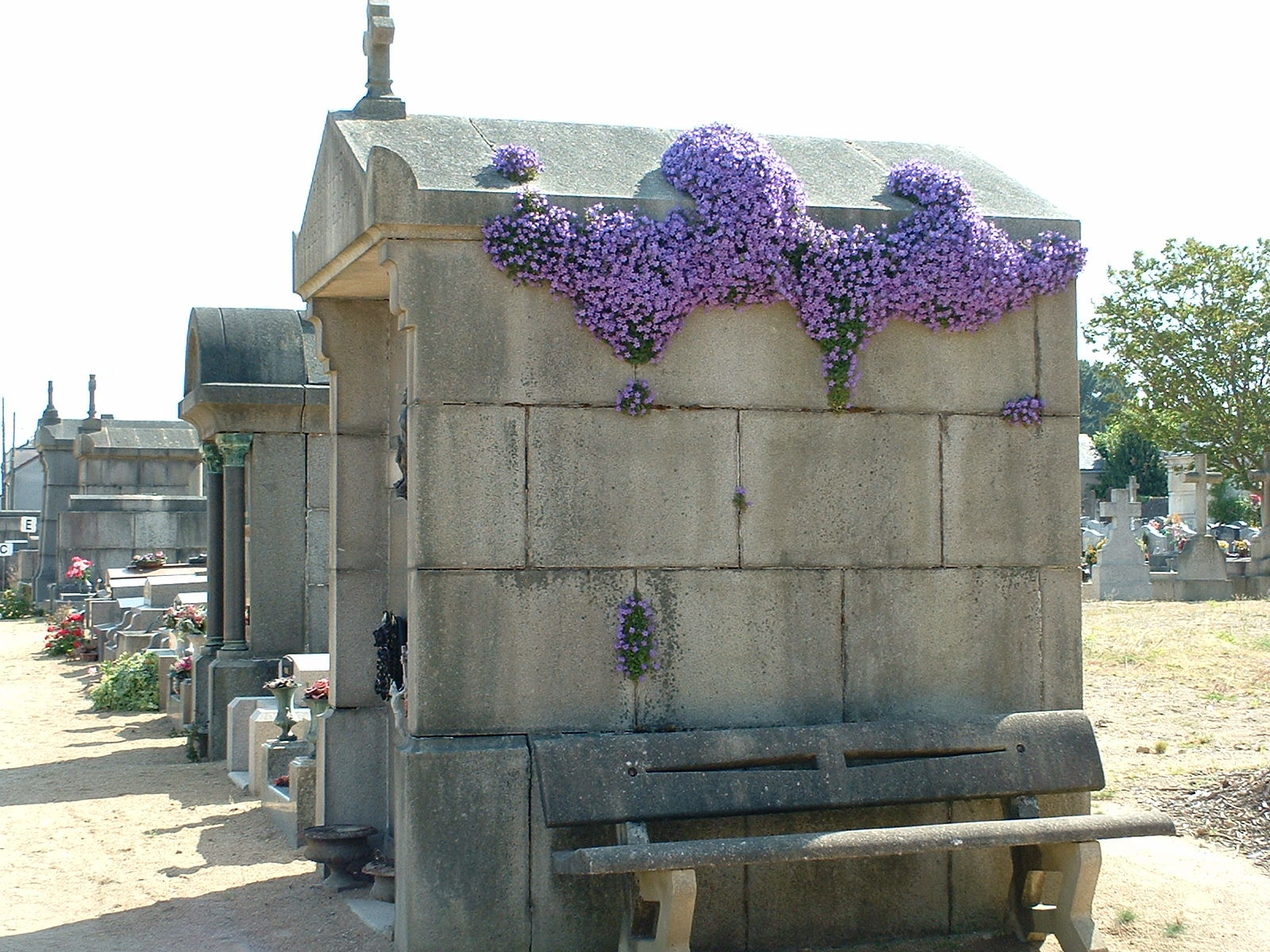
Saint-Clair cemetery vault.

The Saint-Clair parish in Chantenay inaugurated its cemetery in April 1868. Following the incorporation of Chantenay into Nantes in 1936, the city proceeded to expand the cemetery site through the acquisition of small adjacent plots, either through amicable negotiation or through the use of expropriation. The cemetery now encompasses 12,480 square meters, maintaining a simple and orderly character.

Notable burials include painter René Pinard (1883–1938), Nantes mayor and deputy Auguste Pageot (1888–1962), and Dr. Paul Macé, municipal and district councilor.

=== Saint-Donatien cemetery ===
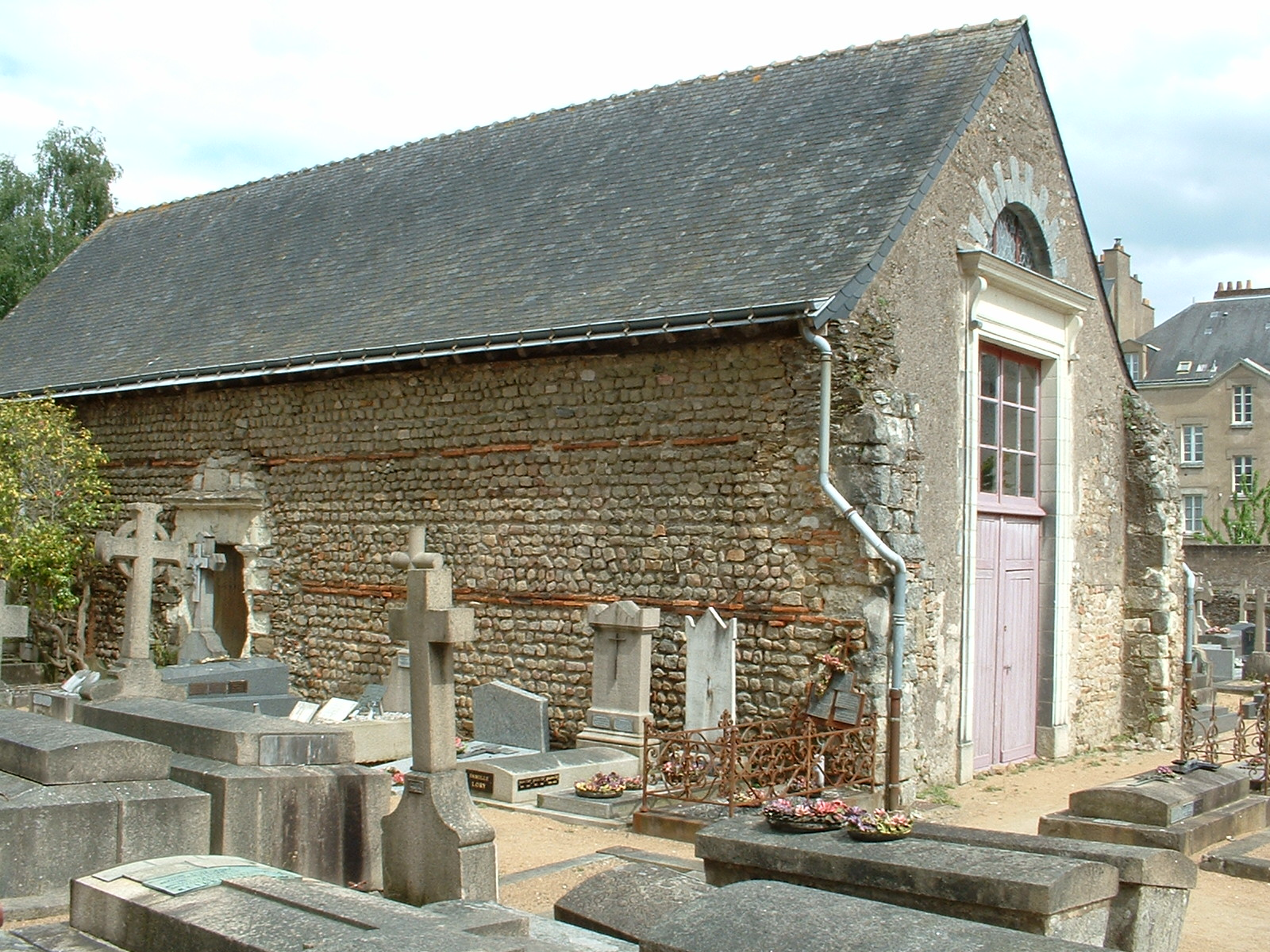
Saint-Donatien cemetery: the Saint-Etienne chapel.

Saint-Donatien Cemetery is the oldest cemetery in Nantes. It spans 0.650 hectares and remains the only cemetery in the city adjacent to its basilica, east of its facade. In the 4th century, Saint Donatien and Saint Rogatien, the patrons of Nantes, were buried here.

These brothers, members of a wealthy Gallo-Roman family, were denounced as Christians and martyred around 304 AD. By the prevailing practice for affluent families at the time, their remains were interred on the family estate in a single grave, which was unearthed during excavations beneath the subsequent crypt in 1873. In 313 AD, Emperor Constantine granted religious freedom to Christians. In 325, the Nantes Christian community constructed a sepulcher in the form of a marble sarcophagus to house the martyrs' relics. The object was placed beneath the arches of an arcosolium (Note: An "arcosole" is an arched vault.) near the tomb, where it served as an altar for the celebration of mass. Consequently, successive churches of the Saint-Donatien parish were constructed around this tomb. Excavations conducted in the early 1870s to expand the church revealed, on July 16, 1873, stone coffins and sarcophagi surrounding the initial sanctuary, thereby attesting to the cemetery's antiquity and the tradition of interring the deceased in proximity to sacred sites.

The cemetery is the site of the Saint-Étienne Chapel (formerly Saint-Georges or Saint-Agapit Chapel), the oldest religious edifice within the confines of the Nantes diocese. It was constructed during the 6th century by Bishop Epiphane, who held the office from 508 to 512, to house a relic of Saint Stephen, the inaugural Christian martyr. The site was a popular pilgrimage destination, with a well-situated in front of the entrance. Pilgrims would wash their hands before entering the church. On June 18, 1796 (2 Messidor, year IV), brothers Antoine and Mathurin Peccot, a government commissioner at the Nantes Mint and an architect, respectively, purchased the church, chapel, rectory, and cemetery, which had been sold as a national property. On November 10, 1802 (19 Brumaire, year XI), the parishioners collectively repurchased the cemetery.

=== Saint-Jacques cemetery ===
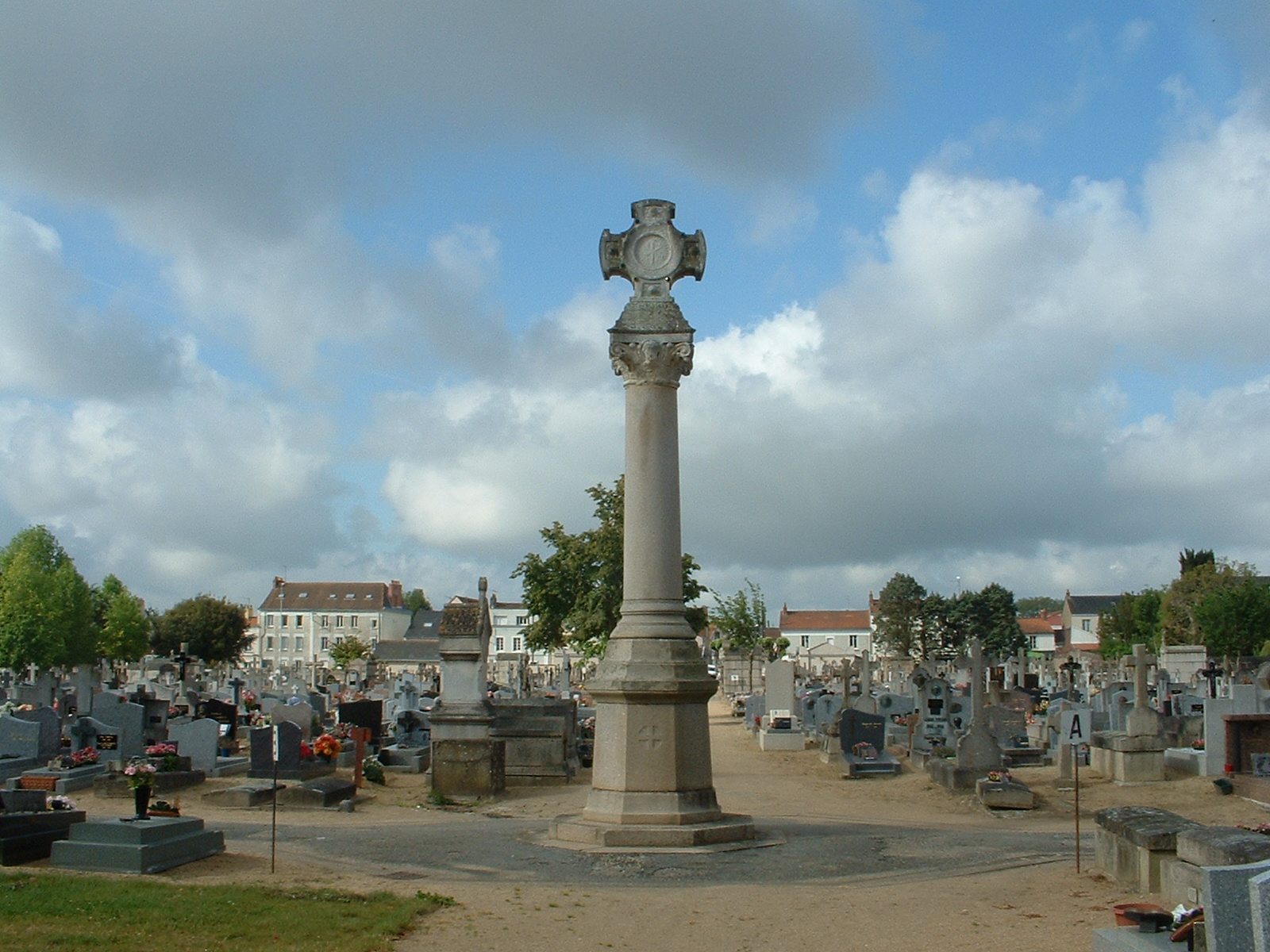
Calvary of Saint-Jacques.

Worship sites in the Nantes South district have been documented since the Middle Ages, indicating a long-standing burial site. The earliest mention dates back to 1618, when a cemetery was located on Vertou Road, called the Bureau Cemetery around 1732. In 1792, parish cemeteries were banned, and bodies were buried near the Clisson Road on unenclosed land. Animal depredations and grazing livestock among the graves alarmed the population. In 1791, Nantes annexed Saint-Jacques, and in 1811, the city acquired three plots of land, collectively comprising nearly 7,500 square meters, at La Terre Rouge, on the Bonne-Garde road, situated on the Clisson route. The funds required for this acquisition were drawn from a special contribution levied during Nantes' occupation by allied troops against the Empire.

This cemetery became the final resting place for the deceased from Hôtel-Dieu and the new hospital, Saint-Jacques, built in 1834 next to Saint-Sébastien-sur-Loire. Two owners were expropriated, and the cemetery expanded by 3,100 square meters. Over time, the cemetery underwent a series of expansions, with the area increasing by 10,500 square meters in 1846, 4,300 in 1904, 9,000 in 1924, and 14,400 in 1928, reaching a total area of 5 hectares.

The Saint-Jacques cemetery contains a Calvary. Additionally, a monument has been erected in memory of the victims of the Saint-Philibert steamboat shipwrecking, in which nearly 500 individuals perished when the vessel transporting passengers from the island of Noirmoutier to the mainland sank. Upon discovering that 54 of the recovered bodies had no relatives or family members to provide them with a burial, the city of Nantes decided to provide them with solemn funerals. Initially, these bodies were buried at La Bouteillerie, but they were later (Note: The source does not specify when.) transferred to Saint-Jacques.

=== Saint-Joseph-de-Porterie cemetery ===
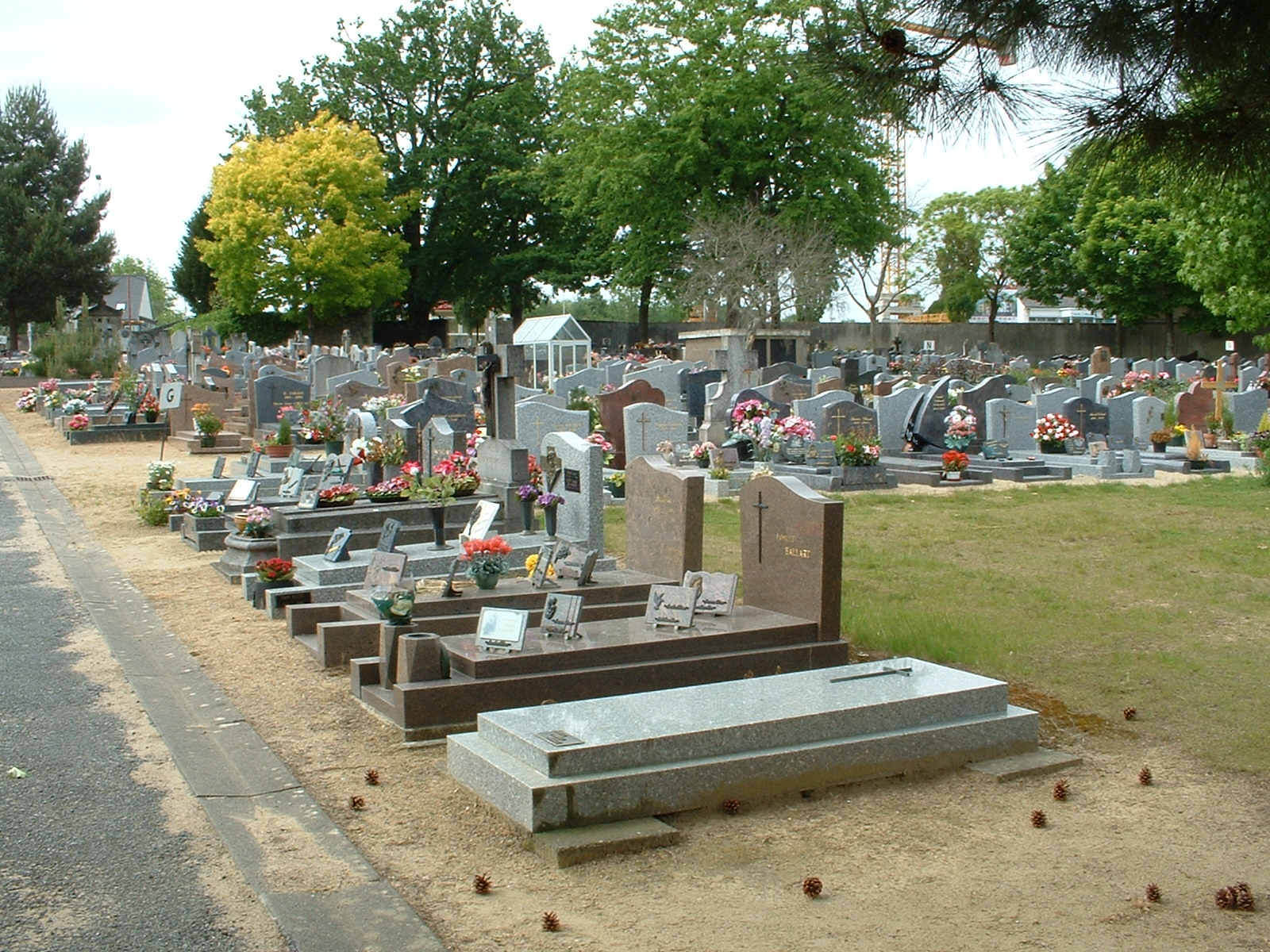
View of Saint-Joseph cemetery.

The parish of Saint-Joseph-de-Porterie was established in 1845 at the behest of the practitioners who were compelled to attend the Saint-Donatien church, which was their primary place of worship at the time. The first burials were conducted on land leased from a private owner along the route to Carquefou. In 1851, Nantes city council committed to spending a specified sum to construct a wall surrounding the graves, with any cost overruns and material transport being the responsibility of the parishioners. In 1928, the administration faced overcrowding in the cemetery. The construction of working-class housing on the outskirts of the Batignolles factory boosted the local population and consequently mortality rates. The number of burials nearly quadrupled since the beginning of the new housing development. The acquisition of 4,500 square meters was formalized in April 1929. A further extension in 1987 increased the total area to 1,170 hectares. At the cemetery entrance, two small private cemeteries belong to the Le Lasseur and La Laurencie families.

=== Old Saint-Martin cemetery ===
This necropolis is the historic cemetery of the Saint-Martin de Chantenay parish, which formed the basis of Chantenay-sur-Loire and was subsequently annexed by Nantes in 1908. The first concession was purchased on May 27, 1827. The old Saint-Martin Cemetery covers 0.350 hectares on sloping terrain.

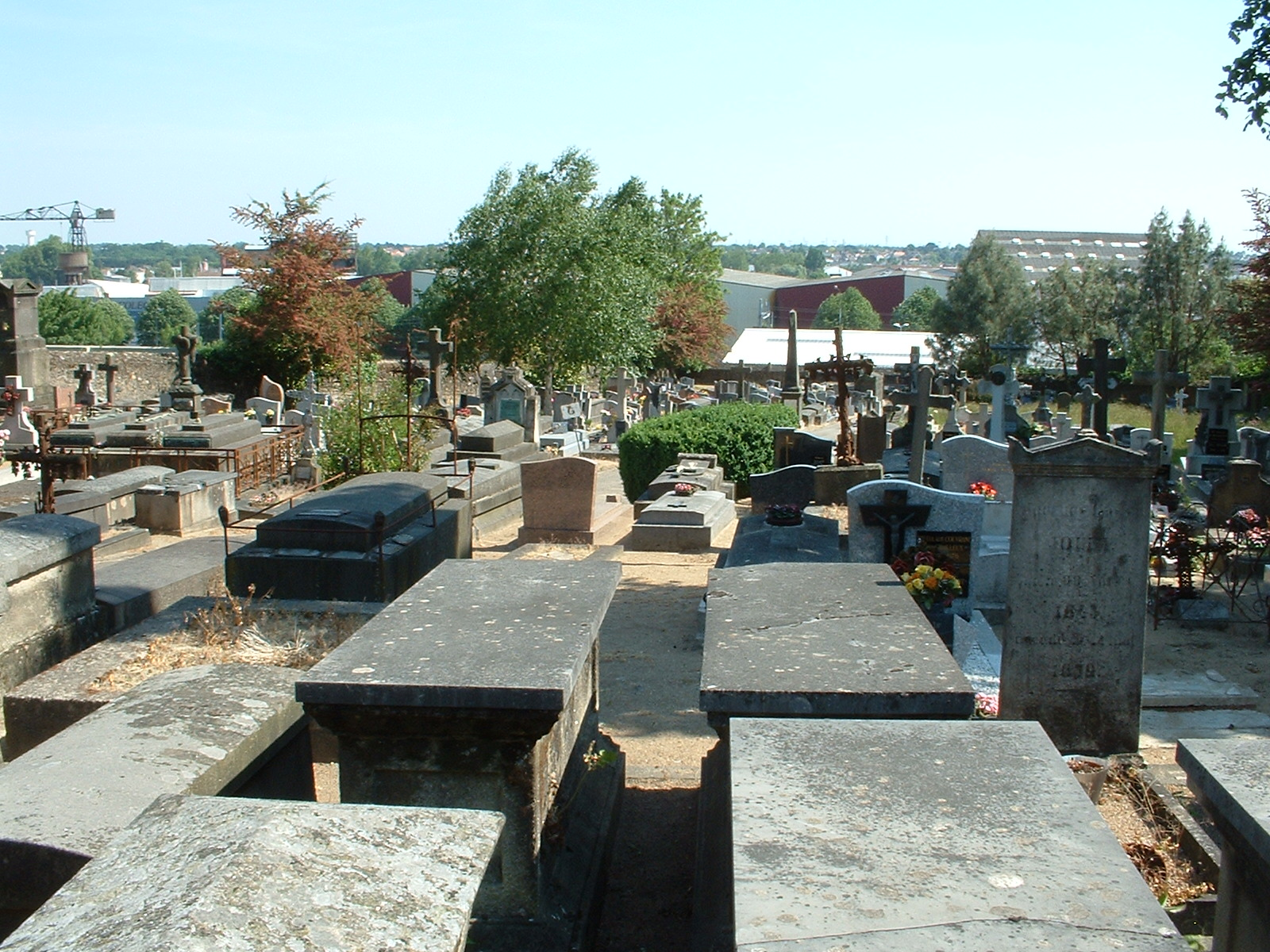
Saint-Martin Ancien (general view).

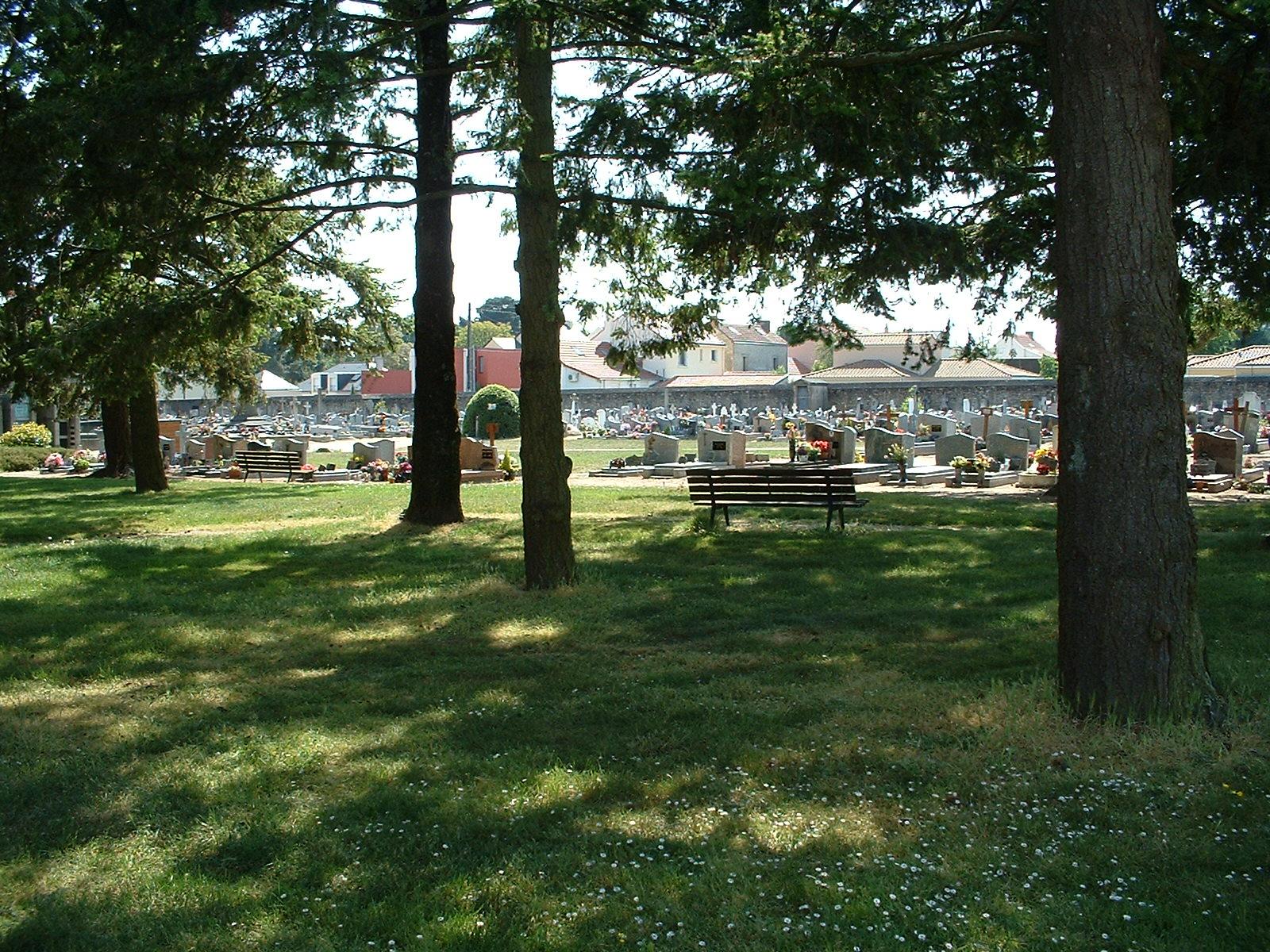
Saint-Martin nouveau (View from the wooded area).

=== Saint-Martin New cemetery ===
The Saint-Martin New Cemetery encompasses an area of 1.3 hectares. It was inaugurated on April 24, 1892.

=== Sainte-Anne Old cemetery ===
In 1846, the municipal council of Chantenay-sur-Loire (then an independent commune)passed a resolution that revoked the right of parishioners of Sainte-Anne to be buried in the Chantenay cemetery. They petitioned the Nantes town hall, arguing that the distance between their parish and the Miséricorde cemetery was too great and demanding the creation of a cemetery near Sainte-Anne Church. In January 1849, Évariste Colombel, mayor of Nantes, signed the acquisition act for a market garden plot owned by a certain Thomine. According to É. Ravilly and J.-Y. de Sallier Dupin, the decision was made in February 1850. This land was located at a place called "La Petite Hautière" along the Bigotière path. The purchase was followed by the construction of a perimeter wall, a gravedigger's lodge, and an entrance gate. The cemetery then covered 6,000 square meters. In 1887, Mr. Péroteaux sold two plots of 1,200 and 2,500 square meters to the city for the cemetery's expansion. Nevertheless, in March 1895, projections indicated that the cemetery's capacity would not exceed two years at the current burial rate, prompting the opening of the New Sainte-Anne Cemetery.

Among the graves in the Old Sainte-Anne Cemetery is that of Gaëtan Rondeau, mayor of Nantes from 1941 to 1942.

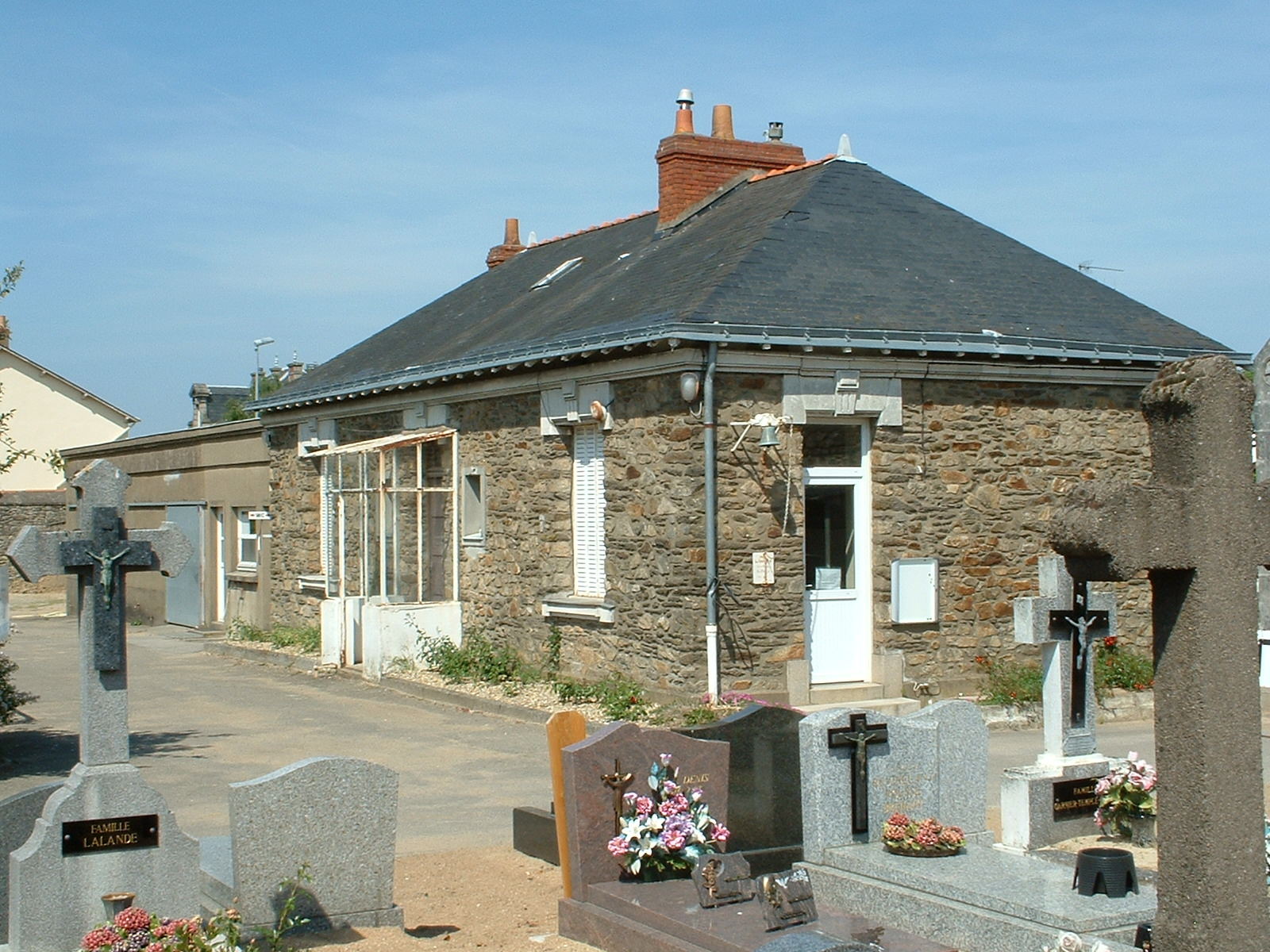
Sainte-Anne ancien: former gravedigger's quarters.

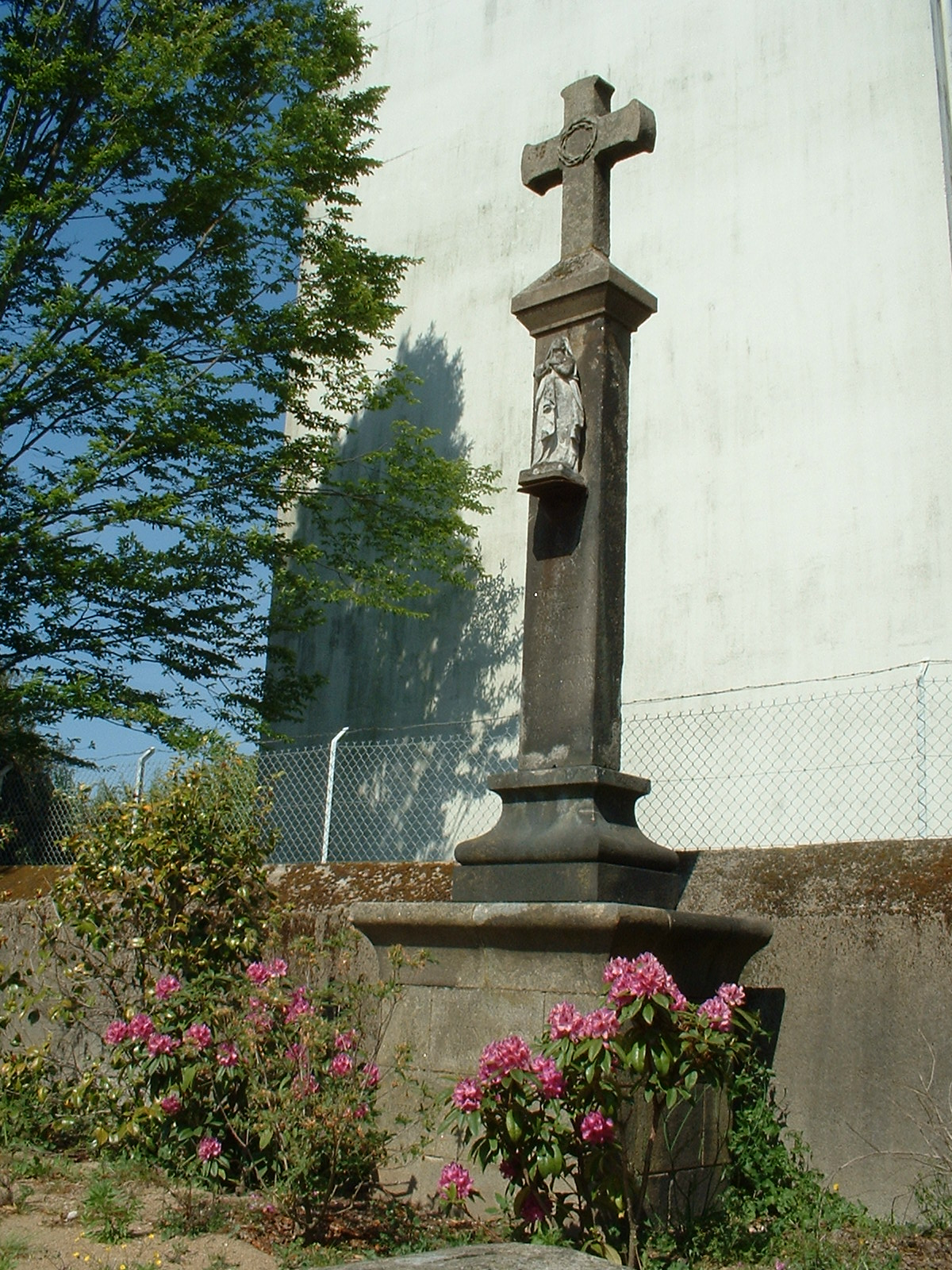
Calvary in the new Sainte-Anne cemetery.

=== Sainte-Anne new cemetery ===
After considering an extension of the old Sainte-Anne cemetery, the city ultimately rejected the proposal due to the prohibitive cost of the desired land and its proximity to residences. Consequently, on the same street but on the opposite side, on land belonging to Chantenay-sur-Loire, at "La Souris-Chaude," the town hall under Paul-Émile Sarradin acquired land from Mr. Tessier on May 27, 1898. The soil was clayey, with the phreatic zone situated at a depth of only 60 centimeters below the surface. This necessitated the implementation of drainage work. The cemetery covers an area of 11,428 square meters.

=== Toutes-Aides cemetery ===
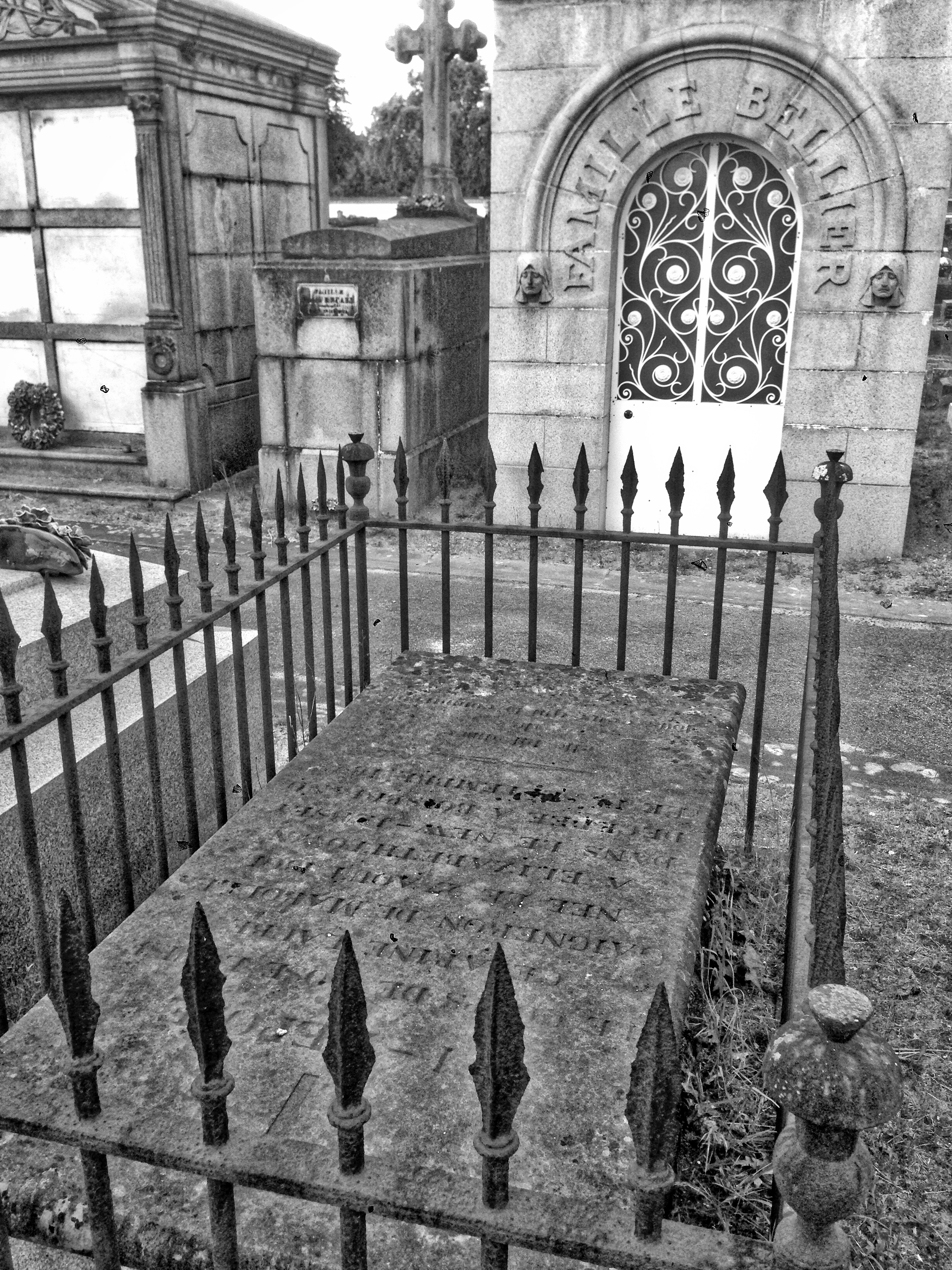
"She was loved by all who knew her" - Tomb no. 1 - Laure Gaigneron de Marolles.

Before its designation as the municipal cemetery of Doulon, the western end of the current cemetery was selected in 1829 as the burial site for Laure Gaigneron de Marolles. In the current municipal records, this grave is designated as number 1. The installation of grave number two did not occur until 25 years later. In 1829, this site probably marked the western end of the Grand-Blottereau château park. The owner, Siochan de Kersabiec, a former mayor of Doulon, signed the death certificate for Laure Gaigneron de Marolles along with the attending physician. The grave is protected by a grid of extremely sharp and pointed Roman lictor fasces, rendering access to the tombstone impossible without risk of injury. Laure Gaigneron de Marolles was born in the United States and died at the Bois-Briand château. Camille Mellinet illustrated her life in Histoire de la Musique à Nantes.

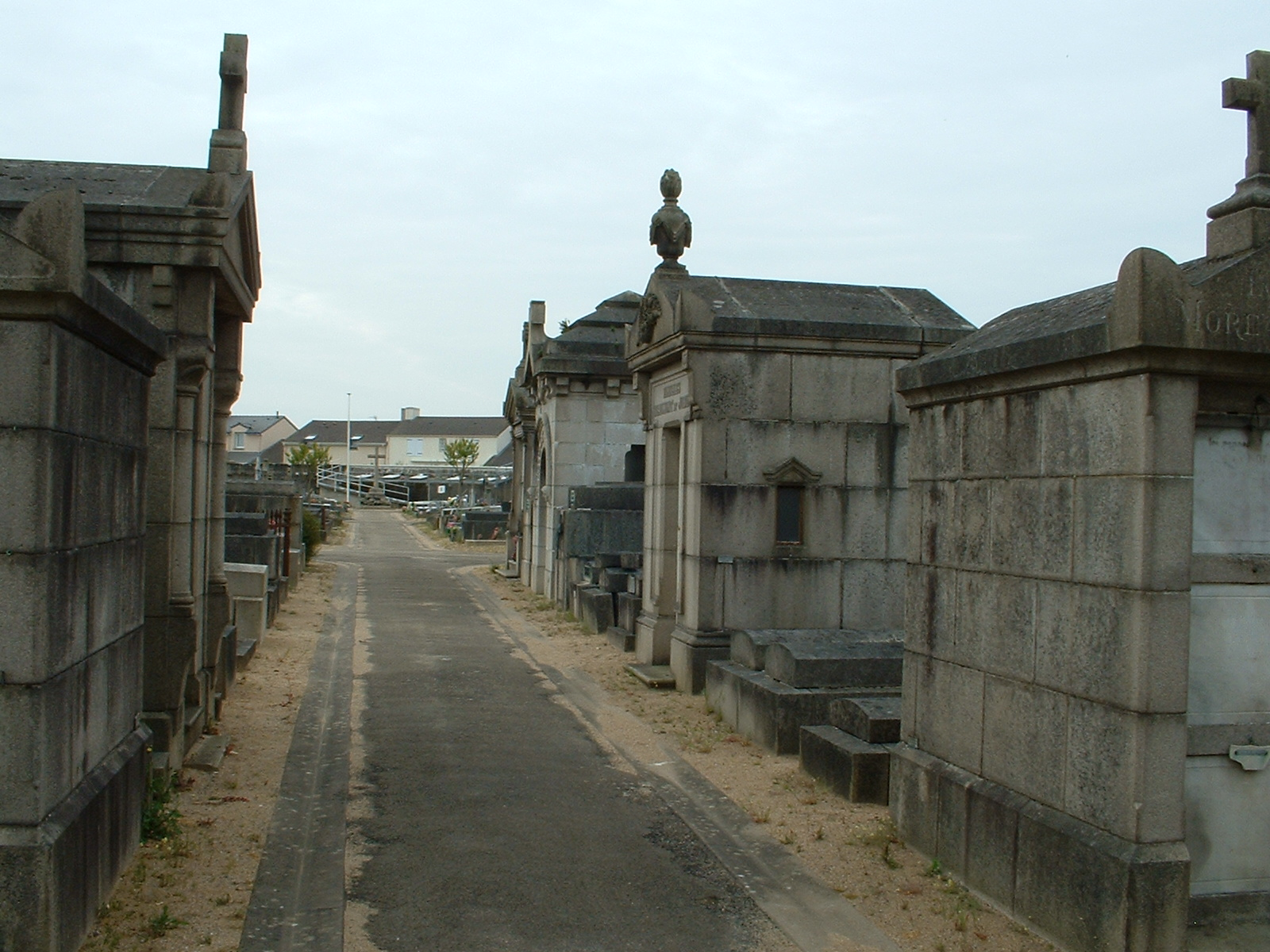
Cellars of Toutes-Aides

The Toutes-Aides cemetery became the municipal cemetery of Doulon, and subsequently of Nantes following the annexation of Doulon by Nantes in 1908. In 1925, the municipal council accepted a legacy of 40,000 francs from Miss Pélagie Jubin, with the stipulation that the Beaumont-Jubin family vault be maintained perpetually, despite the cessation of perpetual concessions. In 1928, the administration observed that the site was three-quarters occupied by common graves. The city acquired approximately 1,300 square meters of market garden land where lily of the valley, carnations, radishes, salads, vine shoots, and pear trees were cultivated. In 1930, the municipal authorities purchased an additional 1,500 square meters of land. This brought the total area of the cemetery to 1.5 hectares. In 1932, the construction of a crematorium was considered as an alternative to an ossuary for the disposal of old bones.

=== Vieux-Doulon cemetery ===
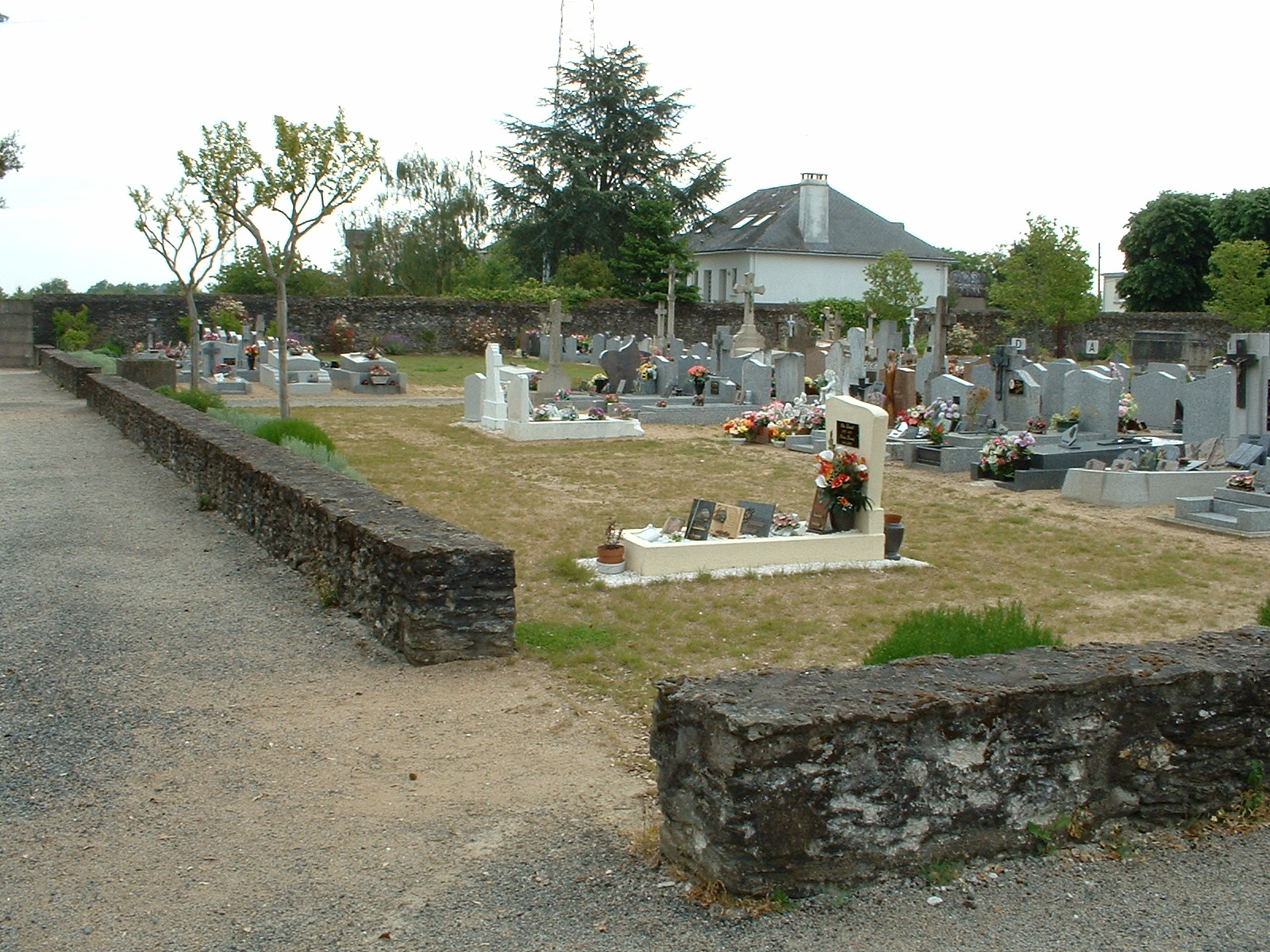
Remains of pre-1930 boundaries.

The written records about 0.570-hectare cemetery are scarce. In March 1930, an expansion of 5,000 square meters was made possible through the acquisition of three plots belonging to the Count of Becdelièvre. In 1988, the neighboring former public works depot was annexed.

== Contemporary cemetery management ==
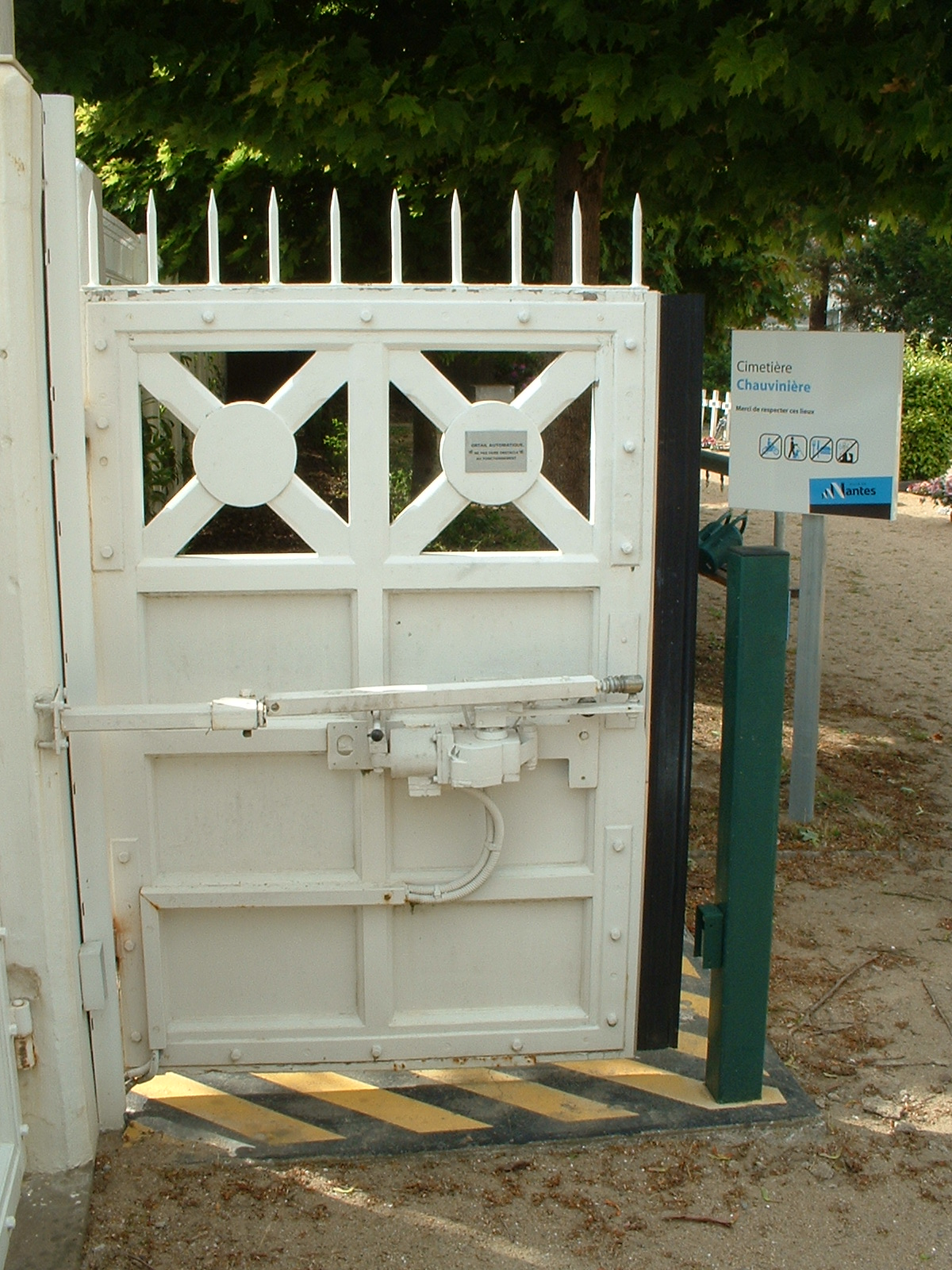
La Chauvinière: automatic door with articulated arm.

The cemeteries of Nantes are accessible to the public daily, from 8 a.m. to 8 p.m. This accessibility is made possible by the use of automatic gates. There are two "houses" with funeral rooms (funerariums) in the town: one in the north near the landscaped cemetery and one in the south next to Saint-Jacques Cemetery. A mortuary with four funeral rooms is located at the Nantes University Hospital.

Individuals who die in Nantes, as well as residents who die elsewhere, may be interred in a communal plot in a city cemetery for five years. Following this period, the remains are transferred to the common ossuary unless relatives acquire a concession. This concession can also be purchased upon death. In both cases, concessions in Nantes cemeteries are available for fifteen or thirty years. There are individual, family, and collective concessions. The allocation of a plot is subject to the internal regulations of each cemetery. Following religious beliefs, some cemeteries permit the interment of the deceased in areas reserved for specific religious communities. (Note: The source does not specify in which cemeteries.)

In addition to traditional burial, cremation is also an option. The only crematorium in Nantes is located in the Parc Cemetery, which is a municipal facility managed by the OGF company under a public service delegation. Four cemeteries (Parc, Bouteillerie, Miséricorde, and Saint-Jacques) have a designated area for scattering ashes or placing them in an urn in a columbarium (they can also be kept by relatives).

In 2009, the burial service of the Nantes cemetery department conducted 615 burials, including 242 concessions, 105 communal plots, 112 reburials, and 156 deposits in columbariums. A total of 66 exhumations were conducted on the ground and 115 in vaults, resulting in 181 exhumations in all. The total number of interventions was 796. Private companies have also been involved in the process, with masonry companies carrying out vault burials since 2006. The proportion of individuals choosing free land burial has increased significantly between 2008 and 2009, rising by approximately 40%.

The duration of concessions does not exceed thirty years. As of 2023, the cost of a thirty-year concession was 1,107€, while a fifteen-year concession costs 493€. These rates are higher than those in Neuilly-sur-Seine and Strasbourg, and comparable to those in Bordeaux, where perpetual concessions are accepted.

== See also ==
- Tomb of Francis II, Duke of Brittany
- Lists of cemeteries

== Bibliography ==
=== Books used in writing the article ===
- de Berranger, Henri (1975). Évocation du vieux Nante (in French) (2nd ed.). Paris: Les Éditions de Minuit. ISBN 2-7073-0061-6. OCLC 312748431.
- Durand, Eugène (2004). Saint-Donatien : Nantes (in French) (2nd ed.). Le Poiré-sur Vie.
- Durville, Georges (1977). Études sur le vieux Nantes d'après les documents originaux (in French). Vol. 1 (2nd ed.). Brussels: Éditions Culture et civilisation.
- Flohic, Jean-Luc (1999). Le Patrimoine des communes de la Loire-Atlantique. Le patrimoine des communes de France (in French). Vol. 2. Charenton-le-Pont: Flohic éditions. ISBN 2-84234-040-X.
- Kahn, Claude; Landais, Jean (1990). Des Lieux de mémoire : les quinze cimetières de Nantes (in French). Nantes: Ouest éditions et Université inter-âges de Nantes. ISBN 978-2-908261-01-1. LCCN 92161105.
- Lassère, Madeleine (1994). Les cimetières de Nantes au xixe siècle. Les annales de Bretagne et des pays de l'Ouest (in French). Vol. 101. Rennes: Université de Haute-Bretagne. pp. 139–160. doi:10.3406/abpo.1994.3535. ISSN 2108-6443.
- Leblouck, L (1982). Le cimetière supplémentaire de la Route de Rennes. Bulletin de la société archéologique et historique de la Loire-Atlantique (in French). Vol. 118.
- Lemaître, A (1983). Espace sacré et territoire vital au xviiie siècle. Annales de Bretagne et des Pays de l'Ouest (in French). Vol. 90.
- Leniaud, Jean-Michel; Bienvenu, Gilles; Curie, Pierre; Daboust, Véronique; Eraud, Dominique; Gros, Catherine; James, François-Charles; Riffet, Odette (1991). Nantes, la cathédrale - Loire-Atlantique. Images du patrimoine (in French). Paris: Inventaire général des monuments et des richesses artistiques de la France. Commission régionale Pays de la Loire.
- Lhommeau, Éric; Roberts, Karen (2009a). Guide du cimetière de la Bouteillerie Nantes (in French). Nantes: Le Veilleur de nuit. p. 88. ISBN 978-2-9528652-5-8.
- Lhommeau, Éric; Roberts, Karen (2009b). Guide du cimetière Miséricorde de Nantes (in French). Le Veilleur de nuit. p. 89. ISBN 978-2-9528652-2-7.
- Martineau, Gilberte; Aufray, Jacques (2002). n haut lieu de mémoire strictement nantaise : le cimetière de la Chauvinière. Les annales de Nantes et du pays nantais (in French). Nantes: Société académique de Nantes et de la Loire-Atlantique. pp. 38–40.
- Monteil, Martial (2008). "Les édifices des premiers temps chrétiens (ive – viie siècle de notre ère) à Nantes". Nantes religieuse, de l'Antiquité chrétienne à nos jours : actes du colloque organisé à l'université de Nantes (19-20 octobre 2006). Bulletin de la Société archéologique et historique de Nantes et de la Loire-Atlantique (in French). Département d'histoire et d'archéologie de l'université de Nantes. ISSN 1283-8454.
- Rumin, Marcel (2001). Un cimetière oublié des Nantais. Annales de Nantes et du pays nantais (in French). Nantes: Société académique de Nantes et de la Loire-Atlantique. pp. 39–40.
- Service des espaces verts de la ville de Nantes (1986). Jardins des plantes de Nantes (in French). Nantes: Ville de Nantes.
- Université de Nantes. Service formation continue dont université permanente (1984). Çà et là par les rues de Nantes (in French). Nantes: Reflets du passé. ISBN 2-86507-016-6.

=== Other books ===
- Clermont, L (1894). Paroisse Saint-Similien. I. Les cimetières de la place et du quartier Saint-Similien. II. Le clocher et les cloches (in French). Nantes: Imprimerie Emile Grimaud.
- Coupry, Paul (1887). Les Cimetières barbares du xixe siècle remplacés par les cimetières de l'avenir, système proposé par Paul Coupry fils (in French). Nantes: Imprimerie du commerce.
- Coupry, Paul (1892). Cimetières de l'avenir : système P. Coupry fils : Société en commandite par actions, P. Coupry fils et Cie (in French). Nantes: Imprimerie F. Salières.
- Joxe, Roger (1982). Les Protestants du comté de Nantes au seizième siècle et au début du dix-septième siècle (in French). Marseille: Éditions Jeanne Laffite. ISBN 978-2-86276-050-6.
- Lelièvre, Pierre (1988). Nantes au xviiie siècle : urbanisme et architecture (in French). Paris: Éditions Picard. ISBN 978-2-7084-0351-2.
- Maître, Léon (1894). La nécropole de Saint-Similien Nantes. Bulletin archéologique de l'Association bretonne (in French). Vol. 13. pp. 112–117. Archived from the original on June 24, 2024.
- Vaurigaud, Benjamin (1880). Histoire de l'Église réformée de Nantes depuis l'origine jusqu'au temps présent (in French). Paris: Sandoz et Fischbacher.
- de Wismes, Gaëtan (1898). Les Personnages sculptés des monuments religieux et civils, des rues, places, promenades et cimetières de la ville de Nantes : du petit nombre de ceux qui existent, de quelle manière on devrait l'accroître (in French). Vannes: Lafoly.
