= List of people from Nantes =

This is a list of people born in, residents of, or otherwise closely associated with the city of Nantes, France.

== A ==
- Anne of Brittany (1477–1514), Duchess of Brittany and Queen consort of France (only woman to have married two kings of France, Charles VIII and Louis XII)

== B ==
- Jean Marguerite Bachelier (1751-1843), revolutionary
- Charles-Amable Battaille (1822–1872), French operatic bass
- Henri-Franck Beaupérin (born 1968), classical organist
- François Bégaudeau (born 1971), writer, journalist and actor
- René Berthelot (? – 1664), French actor and prominent member of Molière's theatre troupe
- Sophie Berthelot (1837–1907), wife of Marcellin Berthelot and the first woman to be interred at the Panthéon
- Louis-Albert Bourgault-Ducoudray (1840–1910), composer and professor (Prix de Rome laureate)
- Claire Bretécher (1940–2020), cartoonist
- Aristide Briand (1862–1932), French statesman (1926 Nobel Peace Prize laureate)

== C ==
- Claude Cahun (born Lucy Schwob) (1894–1954), photographer and author
- Pierre Cambronne, general (commander of the Old Guard at Waterloo)
- Célanie Carissan (1843–1927), composer, writer and pianist
- Jacques Cassard (1679–1740), corsair
- Benoit Cauet (born 1969), football player and manager.
- Jeanne Cherhal, singer-songwriter
- Athanase-Charles-Marie Charette de la Contrie (1832–1911), French royal and general
- C2C, music producer

== D ==
- Jacques Demy, movie director
- Jehan Desanges, (1929–2021), historian

== F ==
- Emerse Faé (1984), Ivorian former professional footballer
- Manu Feildel, French chef/culinary contest judge, now lives in Australia, judge of My Kitchen Rules.
- Thierry Fortineau (1953–2006), actor
- Ernest Fouinet (1799–1845), 19th-century novelist and poet.

== G ==
- Jean Graton (1923–2021), cartoonist, creator of Michel Vaillant
- Brigitte Grésy (born 1947), French minister

== H ==
- Linda Hardy (born 1973), actress and model (Miss France 1992)

== L ==
- Paul Ladmirault (1844–1944), composer
- Paul de la Gironière (1797–1862), traveller
- Julien de Lallande Poydras (1740–1824), New Orleans member of the United States House of Representatives, merchant, planter, financier, poet and educator
- Denys de La Patellière (1921–2013), film director and scriptwriter
- Charles-Auguste Lebourg (1829–1906), sculptor
- Hugo Leclercq, a.k.a. Madeon (born 1994), music producer and electronic music artist
- Pierre Le Faguays (1892–1962), sculptor
- Jean Leray (1906–1998), mathematician
- Héloïse Letissier (born 1988), (a.k.a. Christine and the Queen) singer

== M ==
- Joseph Malègue (1876-1940), novelist
- Suzanne Malherbe (a.k.a. Marcel Moore), illustrator and designer
- Hugo Marchand, ballet dancer
- Pierre Mauget, professional footballer
- Amédée Ménard, sculptor
- Anne-Gabriel Meusnier de Querlon (1702–1780), man of letters
- Alice Milliat, pioneer od women's sport
- Anna Mouglalis, actress

== P ==
- Claude Perron, actress
- Yvonne Pouzin (1884–1947), phthisiatrist, wife of Joseph Malègue

== R ==
- Jules Edouard Roiné, sculptor and medallist
- Benoit Regent (1953–1994), actor

== S ==
- Constance de Salm (1767–1845), poet and miscellaneous writer; through her second marriage, she became Princess of Salm-Dyck
- Alice Sauvrezis (1866–1946), composer, pianist, and choral conductor

== T ==
- Éric Tabarly (1931–1998), sailor
- Sylvie Tellier (born 1978), model (Miss France 2002)
- Roger Tessier (born 1939), composer
- Jérémy Toulalan (born 1983), football player
- Auguste Toulmouche (1829-1890), painter

== V ==
- Jules Verne, science fiction writer, traveller, lived in Nantes from birth to 1847 then went to Paris and shortly after returned to Nantes, where he stayed until July 1848
- Sandrine Voillet, art historian and television presenter
- Louis Vuillemin (1879–1929), composer

== W ==
- Pierre Waldeck-Rousseau (1846–1904), politician
