= Fumet =

Fumet may refer to

- Dynam-Victor Fumet (1867–1949), French composer and organist
- Raphaël Fumet (1898–1979), French composer and organist
- A kind of stock (food)

== See also ==
- Fumette
