= List of Légion d'honneur recipients by name (G) =

The French government gives out the Legion of Honour awards, to both French and foreign nationals, based on a recipient's exemplary services rendered to France, or to the causes supported by France. This award is divided into five distinct categories (in ascending order), i.e. three ranks: Knight, Officer, Commander, and two titles: Grand Officer and Grand Cross. Knight is the most common and is awarded for either at least 20 years of public service or acts of military or civil bravery. The rest of the categories have a quota for the number of years of service in the category below before they can be awarded. The Officer rank requires a minimum of eight years as a Knight, and the Commander, the highest civilian category for a non-French citizen, requires a minimum of five years as an Officer. The Grand Officer and the Grand Cross are awarded only to French citizens, and each requires three years' service in their respective immediately lower rank. The awards are traditionally published and promoted on 14 July.

The following is a non-exhaustive list of recipients of the Legion of Honour awards, since the first ceremony in May 1803. 2,550 individuals can be awarded the insignia every year. The total number of awards is close to 1 million (estimated at 900,000 in 2021, including over 3,000 Grand Cross recipients), with some 92,000 recipients alive today. Only until 2008 was gender parity achieved amongst the yearly list of recipients, with the total number of women recipients since the award's establishment being only 59 at the end of the second French empire and only 26,000 in 2021.

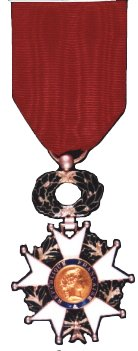

| Recipient | Dates (birth – death) | General work & reason for the recognition | Award category (date) |
|---|---|---|---|
| Gabby Gabreski | | | |
| Jean Louis Gaillot | 1919 – 2003 | French Resistance member during World War II | |
| Akseli Gallen-Kallela | | | |
| Aurele H. Gamache | | 66th Infantry Division, World War II | |
| Jeanne Gang | | | |
| Valentino Garavani | 1932 – present | Italian fashion design | |
| Gabriel García Márquez | | | |
| Gael García Bernal | 1978 – present | Mexican actor | Officer (2026) |
| Timothy Garden, Baron Garden | | | |
| Éveline Garnier | 1904 - 1989 | French Resistance member during World War II, librarian | |
| Jean-Claude Gaudin | | | |
| Charles Gauthier | 1831 – 1891 | French sculptor | |
| James M. Gavin | | | |
| Hobart R. Gay | | | |
| George Reginald Geary | | | |
| Jacob Casson Geiger | | | |
| Erol Gelenbe | | Computer Scientist and Engineer | |
| Étienne Maurice Gérard | | | |
| Alain Gerbault | | | |
| François Géré | 1950 – present | French historian | |
| Paul Gérin-Lajoie | | | |
| Claire M. Germain | 1951 – TBA | Professor of law and law librarian. | |
| Leonard T. Gerow | | | |
| Josephine de Gersdorff | | | |
| Ferdinand Gueldry | 1858 – 1945 | | Knight (1900) |
| Colonel Walter Giblin | | World War II Deputy Director O.S.S. Paris | |
| Jerzy Giedroyc | 1906 – 2000 | Polish writer and activist | |
| John Gielgud | 1904 – 2000 | English actor and director | Chevalier Knight — 1960 |
| Henri Giffard | 1825 – 1882 | French engineer. Invented the steam injector and the powered airship. | |
| Pierre Giffard | 1853 – 1922 | French journalist, newspaper publisher and sports organiser. | |
| Gilberto Gil | 1942 – present | Brazilian musician and politician | |
| Guy Gilbert | | | |
| Virginia Gildersleeve | | | |
| Pierre Gilliard | 1879 – 1962 | French tutor to the children of Nicholas II of Russia | |
| Françoise Gilot | | | |
| Jean Giraudoux | 1882 – 1944 | French novelist, essayist, diplomat and playwright | |
| Olivier Giroud | | World Cup winning footballer | |
| Paul Giroud | 1898 – 1989 | French physician and biologist | |
| Hubert de Givenchy | 1927 | French fashion designer | |
| Gladwyn Jebb | | 1st Baron Gladwyn | |
| Lady Feodora Gleichen | | | |
| Graham Russell "Russ" Godden | 1920 – TBA | Stirling pilot RAF Squadron 196 (1944–45) | |
| Franck Goddio | 1947 – present | French underwater archaeologist | |
| Pierre Godeau | | | |
| Rick Goings | | | |
| Hermann Goldschmidt | | French - German astronomer and painter | |
| Major-General Leonardo González García | | Mexican Air Force Commander | |
| Jane Goodall | | | |
| Allan Goodman | | | |
| Lawrence Seymour Goodman | 1920 – 2021 | British Pilot | |
| Adoor Gopalakrishnan | 1941 – present | Indian filmmaker | |
| Nadine Gordimer | 1923 – present | South African novelist and writer | |
| Amédée Gordini | | | |
| Bart Gordon | | | |
| Pete Goss | | | |
| Derrick Gosselin | | | |
| Théodore Gosselin | | | |
| Henri Gouhier | | | |
| Georges Goursat | 1863 – 1934 | French caricaturist | |
| Bill Graham | | | |
| Arthur Forbes, 9th Earl of Granard | | | |
| David E. Grange, Jr. | | | |
| Ulysses S. Grant III | | | |
| Jules Gravereaux | | | |
| Cary Travers Grayson | | | |
| John Campbell Greenway | | | |
| Henri Grégoire | | | |
| Joseph-Ernest Grégoire | | | |
| Earle Davis Gregory | | | |
| Robert Gregory | | | |
| John Greig | 1923 – 2021 | Telegraphist, Forward Observation Unit (3rd Division D-Day landings, World War II) | |
| Jean Grelaud | | | |
| Brigitte Grésy | | | |
| James Grierson | | British Army Officer | |
| Antoine Griezmann | | World Cup winning footballer | |
| Jean-Pierre Grünfeld | | A French nephrologist | |
| Stanislaw Grzmot-Skotnicki | | | |
| Jean-Marie Guéhenno | | | |
| Michel Guérard | 1933 – present | French chef | |
| Henry Guerlac | 1922 – 1981 | American historian | |
| Jean Aimé Pierre Guerrier | 1925 – 1949 | Lieutenant at the 13^{e} Demi-Brigade de Légion Étrangère | |
| Jose Gustavo Guerrero | 1876 – 1958 | Salvadoran lawyer, First President of The International Court of Justice in the Netherlands | |
| Gordon Guggisberg | | | |
| Sylvie Guillem | 1965 – present | Étoile of the Paris Opera Ballet | Officer (31 December 2008) |
| Sacha Guitry | | | |
| Ara Güler | | | |
| Björn Gunnlaugsson | 1788 – 1876 | Icelandic cartographer | |
| Ruchria Gupta | | | |
| Donald Bilmont Gustafson | 1923 – 2017 | 103rd Infantry Division, 409th Battalion, World War II | |
| Georges Guynemer | | | |
| Reginald Gilbert | 1925-2018 | HMS Ajax, D day landings World War II | |

== See also ==
- Legion of Honour
- List of Legion of Honour recipients by name
- List of foreign recipients of Legion of Honour by name
- List of foreign recipients of the Legion of Honour by country
- List of British recipients of the Legion of Honour for the Crimean War
- Legion of Honour Museum
- Ribbons of the French military and civil awards
- War Cross (France)
