= Pouzin =

Pouzin may refer to:

- Le Pouzin, a commune in the Ardèche department in France
- Louis Pouzin (born 1931), French computer scientist
- Yvonne Pouzin (1884–1947), French tuberculosis specialist
