= François-Isidore Darquier =

French soldier

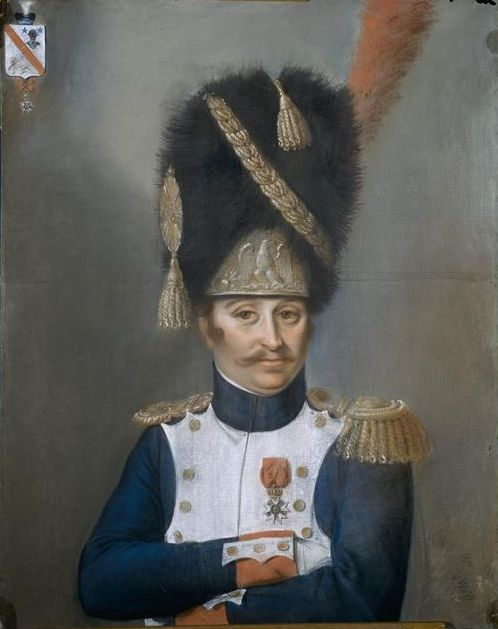
François Isidore Darquier (1770–1812)

François-Isidore Darquier (c. 1770–1812) was a French soldier in the Revolutionary Wars. He fought and died in the Peninsular War, and was ennobled by Napoleon for doing so.

== Life ==
=== Revolutionary Wars ===
He was born in Beaumont-de-Lomagne to François-Alexandre Darquier, wandering receiver of the king's domains, and to Antoinette-Colombe Collonges. Darquier joined the army as a sergeant major on 31 July 1791 in the 4th Haute-Garonne Volunteer Battalion, which became the 130th then 4th Battle Demi-Brigade and finally the 4th Infantry Regiment. He was elected a lieutenant on 8 March 1792 and the same year joined the Savoy campaign. He was made a captain on 5 April 1793 and fought at the Siege of Toulon.

In years III, IV and V (1794-1797) he was in the Army of the Eastern Pyrenees and the Army of Italy. At the Battle of Castiglione he stopped the enemy cavalry five times, giving the French time to regroup and re-take the offensive. At the Battle of Bassano he took several prisoners, including one of the town's leaders, seized two cannon, an artillery train and munitions on the road to Cittadella, was wounded in the head by an enemy sabre, and was captured. He immediately re-joined his corps and was shot in the right arm at a battle on the Brenta. On 30 March, marching against the rebels in Bergamo on a dark night, he fell into a ditch as the action began and was badly wounded in the thigh by his own sabre.

In years VI and VII (1797-1799) he served in the armée d'Angleterre, in years VIII and IX (1799-1801) in the Armée du Rhin and in years XII and XIII (1803-1805) the Saint-Omer camp.

=== Early Napoleonic campaigns ===
His arms as a Knight in the Légion d'honneur - "Argent, a band gules with a knight's insignia, accompanied by a helmet with a grille sable in profile, flanked by two stars azure, and en point a leoparded lion gules passant regardant, on a terrace sinople and holding in its raised paw five spikes sable resting on his shoulder".

He was made a member of the Légion d'honneur on 13 June 1804, moved at the same rank into the 1st Foot Grenadiers Regiment in the Imperial Guard on 30 March 1805, rose to chef de bataillon on 1 August the same year, and was promoted to Officer in the Légion d'honneur on 14 March 1806.

At the battle of Eylau he was under the command of Jean Marie Pierre Dorsenne, commander of the battalion of Guard grenadiers, when it was ordered to march against a column of 6,000 Russians five men abreast - Darquier disdained to fire on the Russians and instead beat them with the bayonet. In Napoleon's words, Darquier's battalion had the "effect of Medusa's head" on the Russian mass of men. Alexander I of Russia gave colonel Darquier a diamond-studded box at Tilsit. The following year Napoleon summoned him to the Congress of Erfurt to serve as part of the personal guard of honour for him and the foreign sovereigns there.

His coat of arms as a baron - "Parted par fess, first part dexter in argent with a helmet face-on with a grille sable surmounted by two stars azure; [first part] sinister [the emblem of] barons drawn from the army; second [part] azure with leoparded lion with its head contorted or, carrying a bundle of lances argent, placed en barre." His liveries were in white, red, blue and yellow, drawing from this coat of arms.

On 20 August 1808 he was made a knight of the Légion d'honneur by letters patent with a monetary grant and on 5 February the following year he was promoted to colonel-major and put in charge of organising the 1st Regiment of Conscript-Grenadiers and then commanding it - this later became the 3rd Regiment of Guard Tirailleurs, part of the 'Young Guard', and distinguished itself at the Battle of Wagram. Also in 1809 Darquier was made a member of the electoral college of Tarn-et-Garonne. He was decorated with the Order of the Iron Crown early in 1810 and by a decree on 15 March and letters patent of 11 June was made a baron de l'Empire, with another monetary grant.

=== Spain ===
He set off for Spain the following 30 April and on arrival was tasked with bringing in contributions and escorting convoys. He was sent from Valladolid on 23 March 1811 at the head of a column of prisoners which was arriving from Madrid - his vanguard met the 600-strong 'Curé' band of guerrillas, pursued them for three leagues and killed forty of their men. Soon afterwards, at Potes, the 3rd Regiment of Imperial Guard Tirailleurs and two battalions of the 1st Regiment and 4th Regiments of Imperial Guard Tirailleurs beat Juan Díaz Porlier whose 8,000 men were occupying the heights and several passes. Colonel Darquier commanded the rearguard in a battle which lasted two days and a night - much of the victory was thanks to his firm attitude and good arrangement of his troops.

On 24 July the Armée du Nord and Armée de Portugal were given orders to evade the British and Portuguese forces (totalling 40,000 men) and resupply Ciudad-Rodrigo. The enemy remained in position at Fuenteguinaldo, not daring to oppose this operation, and the following day it was forced to cross the Côa River and return to Portugal. At that time Darquier was commanding the armée du Nord. Marquesito, with 2000 men, had taken up a position on the high escarpments above Lores. On 1 November Darquier (with only 300 tirailleurs and 140 Imperial Guard dragoons) attacked Marquesito's force with bayonets, hunted them as far as Liébana and killed 360 men.

He was next tasked with recovering from Irun a treasury for the army and to accompany an artillery convoy to Tolosa. He had four battalions, 150 cavalry and two guns under his command. On 16 May 1812, on arrival at Ormaiztegi between Tolosa and Villaréal de Álava, he found the bands of Mina and of the 'Pastor', totalling 5,000 men, who had gathered to attack Darquier's convoy. He attacked them vigorously, routed them and pursued them as far as Segura. They had about 600 casualties, including Mina's friend and second-in-command Guruchada, who was badly wounded and died eight days later.

Sent to investigate Spanish guerrilla bands with a column of 1,200 infantry and 150 cavalry, on 25 of the same month he relieved Santa Cruz de Campezo, a village occupied by the enemy. Despite his gun and advantageous position, Mina lost 200 men and had to wait for night to retire, wounded by a musket ball to the thigh. On 8 June Darquier again found Mina's and Pelos' bands before Acedo, Navarre, near Los Arcos. Their 6,000 infantry and 500 cavalry had taken position on the plain and were occupying the village. 1,600 French infantry and 50 mounted gendarmes routed the bands, who lost 600 killed or wounded. Early in August a band of 6,000 insurgents cut the lines of communication between Miranda de Ebro and Burgos. Darquier was ordered to re-establish them and set out with 1,400 men of his regiment, 300 cavalry and two guns, surprising one of Francisco de Longa's battalions, killing 500 men with the bayonet, dispersing the rest and re-establishing the line of communications.

Logroño was voluntarily evacuated and on 12 August the decision was taken to reoccupy it. Darquier supported that move with 1,500 men, forced major-general Duran to abandon that town with around 3,000 men, attacked him the following day in the positions they had taken up at the entrance to the mountain, and suffered only 300 casualties. He also headed another column, this time of 1,500 men, on 13 September which dispersed the bands surrounding the town of Soria and raised the blockade on that town. On 20 October he beat Duran's band again, this time near Cenicero (La Rioja).

He commanded his regiment in the combined push by the Armée du Nord and Armée de Portugal to raise the siege of Burgos. Near Logroño he completely defied Amor, a partisan commander of 4000 infantry and cavalry. Near Segovia he led 300 Guard cavalry and a battalion of his regiment in dispersing 800 or 900 cavalry under 'El Médico' whilst also relieving a convoy he had been charged with protecting. At Sigüenza he routed the bands led by 'El Empecinado' (Juan Martín Díez), totalling more than 5,000 men. Finally, early in December near Tolosa, he gained a marked advantage over Longa's band, but while at home his exhaustion led to him catching pneumonia at home in Vitoria-Gasteiz, of which he died on 14 December 1812.

Dumoustier announced Darquier's death to the Imperial Guard in the following orders of the day:

The Guard troops were notified that colonel Darquier, commanding 3rd Tirailleur Regiment, has died at Vittoria, on 14th instant, following an illness contracted for some time due to the fatigue experienced as a result of his military operations, [fatigue] which his zeal for his duties made him neglect. This superior officer was one of those who most honoured the French name, by his military talents, his probity and the sound judgement which governed all his actions. Chef de bataillon Mosnier, now commanding the 3rd Tirailleur Regiment, in communicating to baroness Darquier, (Note: She and her sister, the wife of Marshal Lobau, were from Phalsbourg.) his widow, the regrets of the Imperial Guard and the army regarding this loss, announced to her that the inhabitants of the provinces of Spain, with whom her estimable spouse was in contact, feel just as keenly as us the fatal blow which has struck her. As soon as circumstances allow the Guards corps to gather, I authorise the 3rd Tirailleur Regiment to hold a funeral service in memory of their former commander and father.

Napoleon also sent condolences, having intended to promote Darquier to command a brigade in the Guard. Darquier left three daughters and a son, who rose to become a chef d'escadron.
