= Ienissei Ramic =

French concert pianist

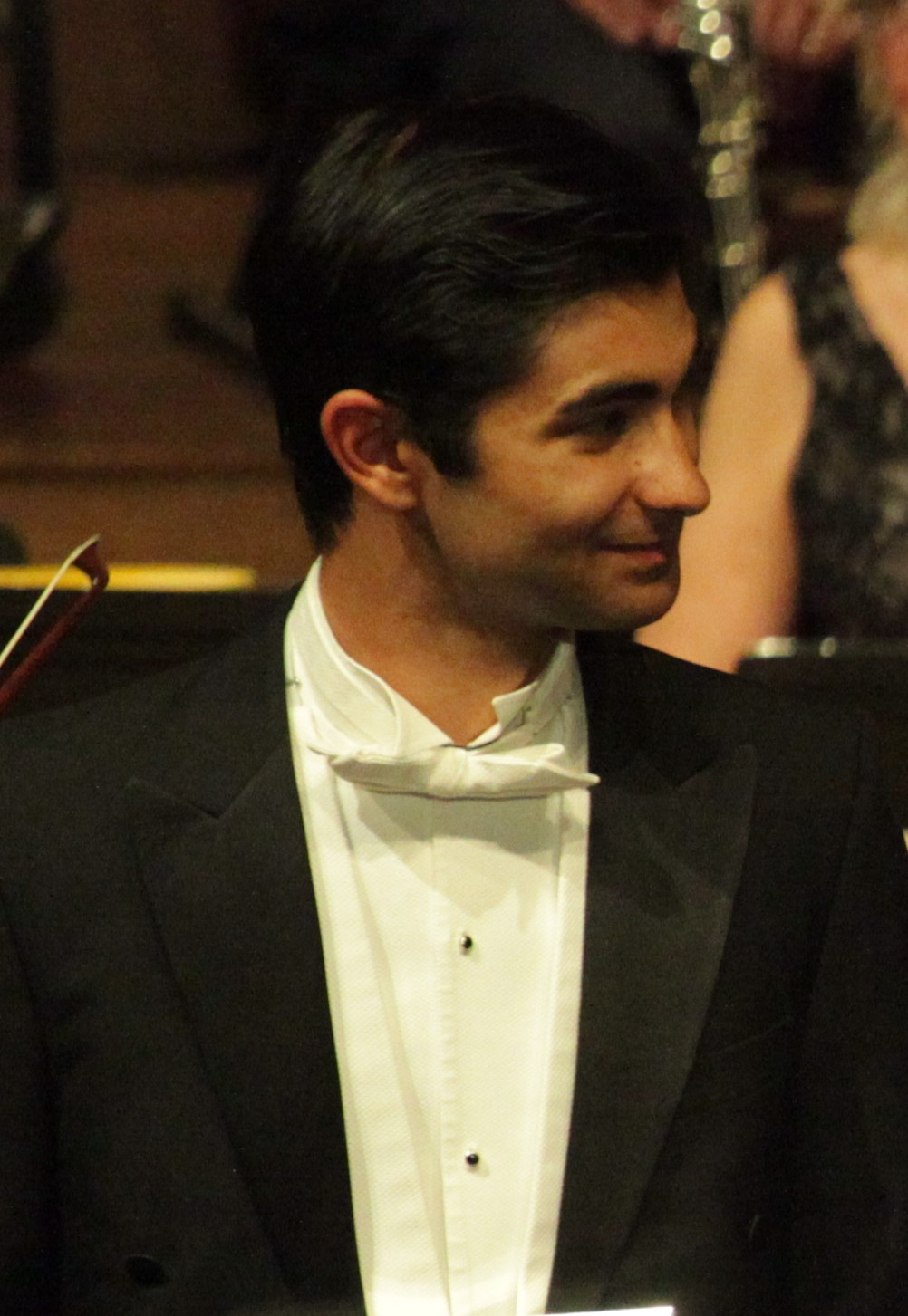
- Ienissei Ramic after a performance at the Salle Gaveau, 2018
- Born: 27 June 1990 (age 34); Moscow
- Occupation: Classical pianist
- Website: ienisseiramic.com

Ienissei Ramic, born 27 June 1990 is a French concert pianist.

== Biography ==
Ienissei Ramic was born in Moscow and lived in Serbia until the age of ten. He grew up in a family of musicians and began studying the piano when he was three years old with his pianist mother, a student of Evgeny Lieberman (himself a pupil of the legendary Heinrich Neuhaus). His father, a virtuoso, won the First Prize for the accordion at the Concours International de Venise in 1984.

With his family, Ienissei Ramic left Serbia for France, where he enrolled in the Conservatoire de Boulogne- Billancourt, in Hortense Cartier-Bresson's class. At the age of 16, he joined Alain Planès’ class at the CNSMDP where he brilliantly distinguished himself, passing his bachelor and master's degrees with the highest honors. At the same time, Lilya Zilberstein and Menahem Pressler were teaching him their secrets. With this background, he joins the great tradition of early 20th century pianists, a tradition in which the piano sings.

In Paris, Ienissei Ramic has appeared at the Salle Gaveau, Bal Blomet, Salle Cortot, where he gave a performance of Franz Liszt’s 12 Transcendantal Etudes and Ravel’s Piano Concerto in G major with orchestra, in Lyon he gave a recital at the Salle Molière. He played at the Hôtel des Ventes de Drouot for the Parisian premiere of Fanny Mendelssohn’s Easter Sonata. Figaro Culture dedicated its front page to the manuscript’s sale, qualifying Ienissei Ramic as a “virtuoso.” Perfumer Jean-Paul Guerlain invited Ienissei to play at his birthday concert and he has participated in several recitals for the charity organization “Virtuoses du Coeur.” As musical director of Leos Janacek’s “The Diary of One Who Disappeared”, staged by Louise Moatty, he was again cited in the Figaro: T. Hillériteau wrote “Ienissei Ramic manages to make one forget the various orchestrations that have been made of the cycle and restore its original purity.” In 2016 he recorded the less-known works of Dynam-Victor Fumet and Raphael Fumet with Polymnie/The Orchard. On France Musique, Frédérique Lodéon commented on his “virtuoso!” playing and Benoît Duteurtre described him as a “brilliant pianist”. Ienissei Ramic's album SERENADE dedicated to the works of Enrique Granados (Angara Mic/InOuie Distribution.) has received special mention by critics and the press. In 2017, Ienissei Ramic made his Chinese debut at the legendary Huangpu Theater in Shanghai, and performed in a series of recitals in Nankin, Shenzhen and Canton. Also a composer, Ienissei's work was performed in Paris at the Théâtre Ranelagh during a silent film screening. Ienissei Ramic has been invited to perform in concerts in Russia, the Netherlands, Spain, Italy, Germany and Serbia.

== Discography ==
- Dynam-Victor Fumet, Raphael Fumet, Works for Solo Piano, Polymnie (2016)
- Enrique Granados, Serenade : Goyescas, Danzas Españolas, Angara Mic (2018)
- Fauré, Schubert, Tchaikovsky, Purcell, Rubinstein, Saint-Saëns, Massenet, Puccini, Rossini, MASQUERADE : Transcriptions for piano, Angara Mic (2021)
