= Édouard Jeanselme =

French dermatologist

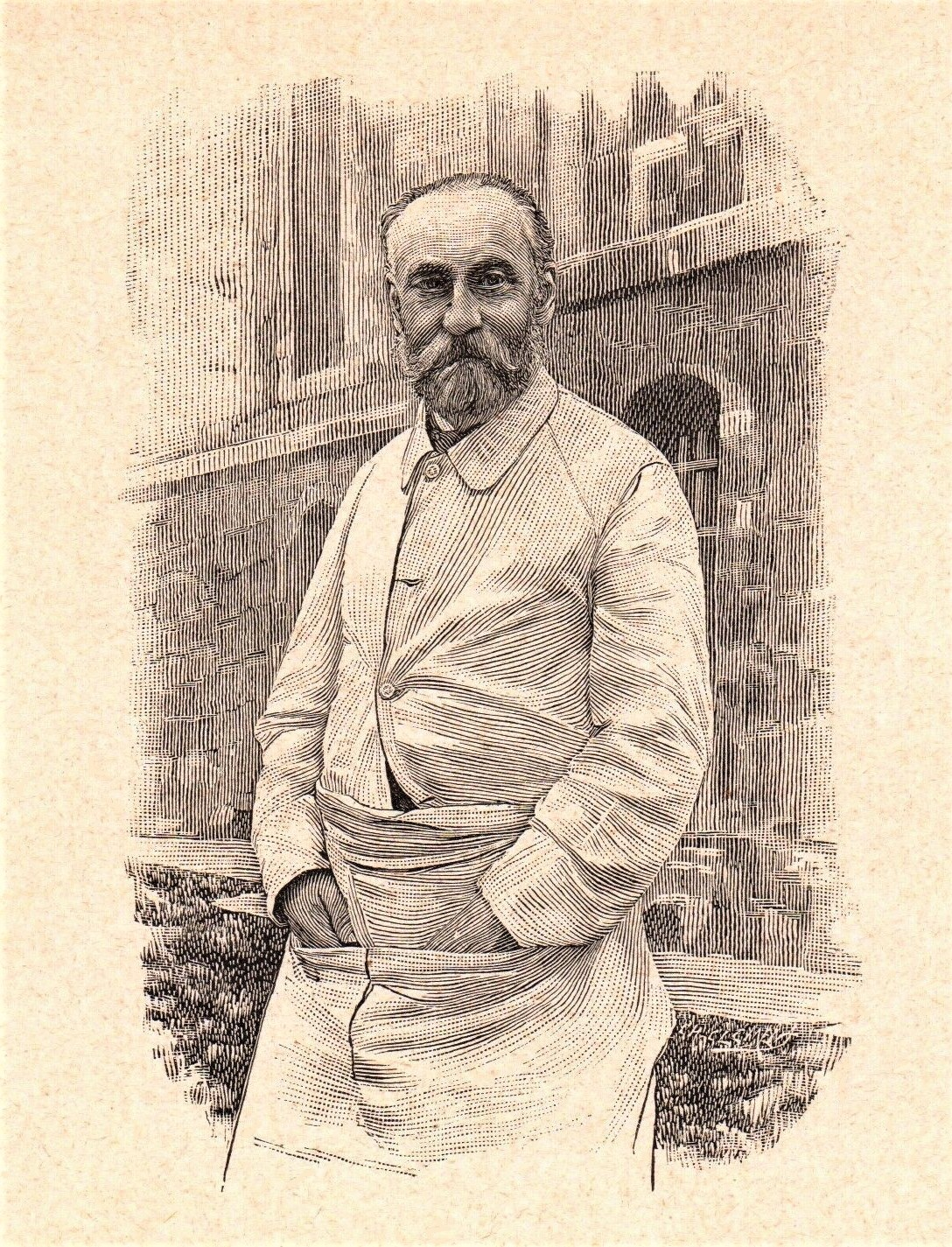

Antoine Édouard Jeanselme (French pronunciation: [ɑ̃twan edwaʁ ʒɑ̃sɛlm]; 14 June 1858, Paris – 9 April 1935, Paris) was a French dermatologist, known for his research of syphilis and leprosy. He was the author of numerous works with history of medicine themes (medicine of the Byzantine Empire, leprosy in medieval France, et al).

In 1883 he began work as a hospital intern, receiving his medical doctorate in 1888. In 1898–1900 he conducted research of leprosy in French Indo-China, during which time, he also conducted studies of beriberi, framboesia, syphilis and variola. In 1901 he became an associate professor, and in 1919 attained the chair of chair of dermatology and syphilology at the faculty of medicine in Paris.

He was instrumental in the founding of the Pavillon de Malte at the Hôpital Saint-Louis (1918). In 1919 he became a member of the Académie de médecine (section on medical pathology), and in 1919–21, he served as president of the Société française d'histoire de la médecine. In 1923 he served as the first president of the Ligue nationale française contre le péril vénérien.

He is credited with performing the first clinical and histological studies of juxta-articular nodes; structures associated with syphilis and yaws that are sometimes referred to as "Jeanselme's nodules". or as "Lutz-Jeanselme nodules", named in conjunction with Brazilian physician Adolfo Lutz. As a treatment for leprosy, he advocated a mixture of chaulmoogra oil, camphor and guaiacol.

== Selected works ==
- Étude sur la lèpre dans la péninsule indo-chinoise et dans le Yunnan, 1900.
- Cours de dermatologie exotique (with A Trémolières), 1904.
- Nodosités juxtaarticulaires. Cong Colonial Paris, Sect Med Hyg Colon, 1904. p 15.
- Le béribéri, 1906.
- Précis de pathologie exotique (with Édouard Rist), 1909.
- La question de l'opium en Extrême-Orient à l'époque contemporaine, 1910.
- La lèpre, 1911.
- Les oeuvres d'assistance et les hôpitaux byzantins au siècle des Comnènes, 1921.
- Le règime alimentaire des anachorétes et des moines byzantins, 1922.
- La syphilis : son aspect pathologique et social, 1925.
- La lèpre en France au Moyen Age et à l'époque contemporaine, 1925.
- Histoire pathologique de la dynastie d'Héraclius, 1927.
- Traité de la syphilis (multi-volume, with other authors, 1931–).
