= Yvonne Pouzin =

French physician

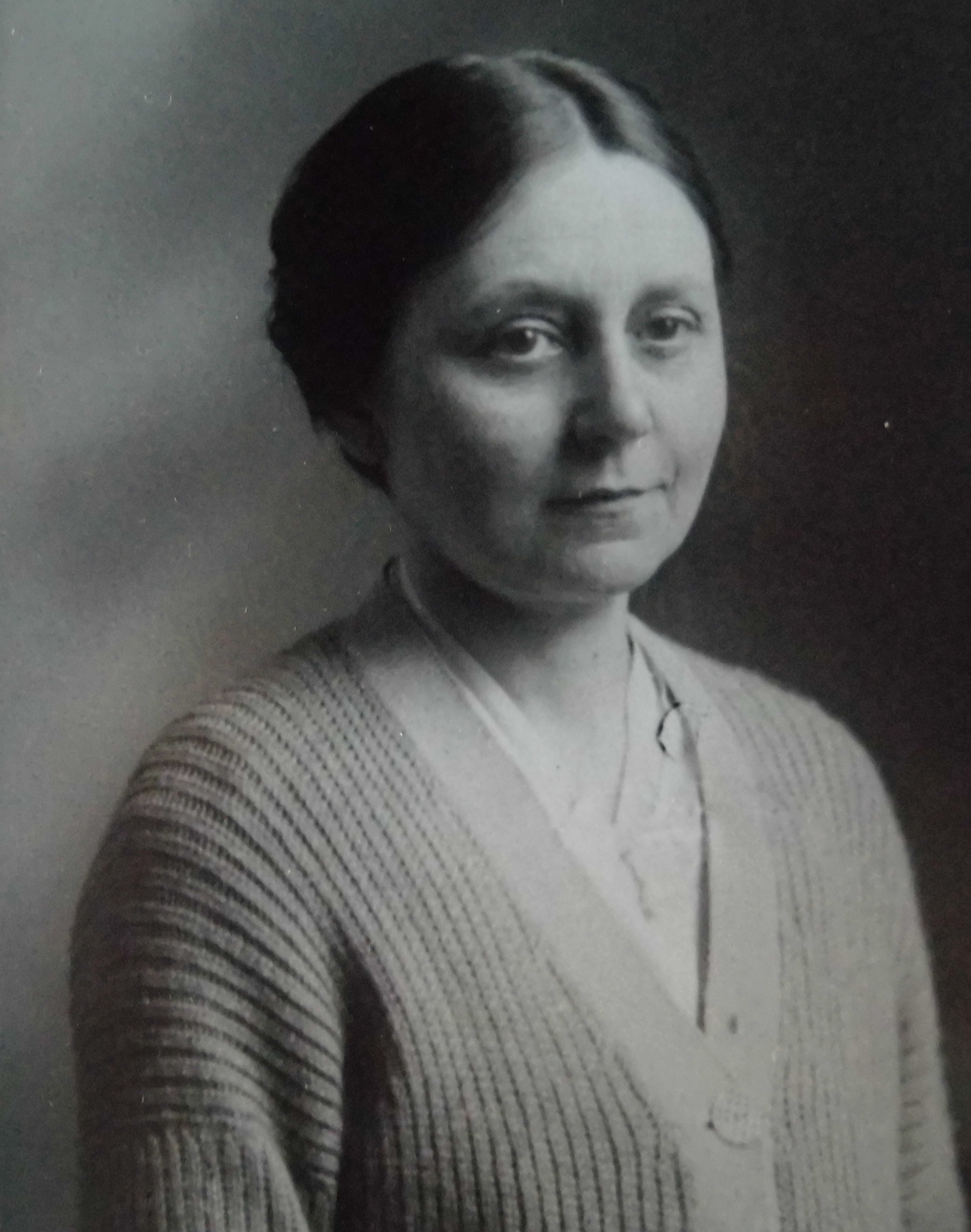
Yvonne Pouzin circa 1923

Yvonne Pouzin (28 April 1884 – 15 April 1947) was a female doctor and French phthisiatrist. She is known for having been the first female praticien hospitalier in France. In 1923 she married the writer Joseph Malègue whose career she actively supported.

== Biography ==
Grand daughter of a watchmaker in Brancas, daughter of an industrialist of Nantes specialising in vermicelli, she had two sisters and one brother. She benefited from a modern education for her time and her family supported her choice to practice medicine.

=== First woman in France to be a praticien hospitalier ===
Pouzin studied at the Ursulines up to an advanced diploma. But attracted by the medical vocation, she prepared at home for her degree, introducing herself to Latin. In November 1905 she began to take courses at the Nantes School of Medicine and interned at the city hospitals. She then went to Paris to prepare for the hospitals' competitive entrance examination. In 1908 she was accepted for a clerkship and in 1912 to that of an internship. She specialised in the treatment of tuberculosis with Professor Ménard and under the direction of Professor Guinon in childhood medicine. In 1916 she defended her thesis, Chronic cervical lymphadenopathies in children with hereditary syphilis.

In 1919, she completed the medical exams at the Hospitals of Nantes, thus becoming the first female praticien hospitalier in France and could thereby do research in better scientific conditions, influence decisions and have students. In the 1920s, she participated in the first World Congress of Women Phthisiologists in New York.

She was then appointed to serve tuberculosis patients, did an internship in Paris with Édouard Rist, who introduced the therapeutic pneumothorax technique, a technique that would be used in the treatment of tuberculosis until the 1950s. She introduced this procedure to Nantes Hospital, now the central University Hospital in the city. As such, she participated in tuberculosis control in the department. Her medical publications led to her being named in 1924, the corresponding member of the Medical Society of the Paris hospitals, and she chaired the Nantes Central Office of Social Hygiene just as she organised the anti-tuberculosis dispensary of La Baule.

=== Meeting Joseph Malègue ===
As a member of the Catholic circle of academics from Nantes, she met the writer Joseph Malègue whom she married on 28 August 1923 at the church of Notre-Dame de Bon-Port. The couple moved into 15 Rue Arsène-Leloup.

Jean Lebrec considers Pouzin as the midwife of the first novel of Malègue, Augustin ou le Maître est là. Malègue's biographer has collected several testimonies from friends of the couple and also cites the essay of Dr. Delaunay Joseph Malègue, from Yvonne Malègue, Estuaires, Bordeaux, 1947 (not paginated). According to Dr. Delaunay, Yvonne Pouzin recognised in Malègue "exceptional value" but perhaps also "weakness", had assumed and issued her husband "of an inert part of himself." Delaunay ends on a question about the first novel by Malègue, Augustin ou le Maître est là: "Had he put this volume Augustin so demanding of his players, without another will, strong love and faith, might come to support his, remove obstacles, overcoming doubts, negotiate the project execution stage? [...] Malègue required a kind of impresario."

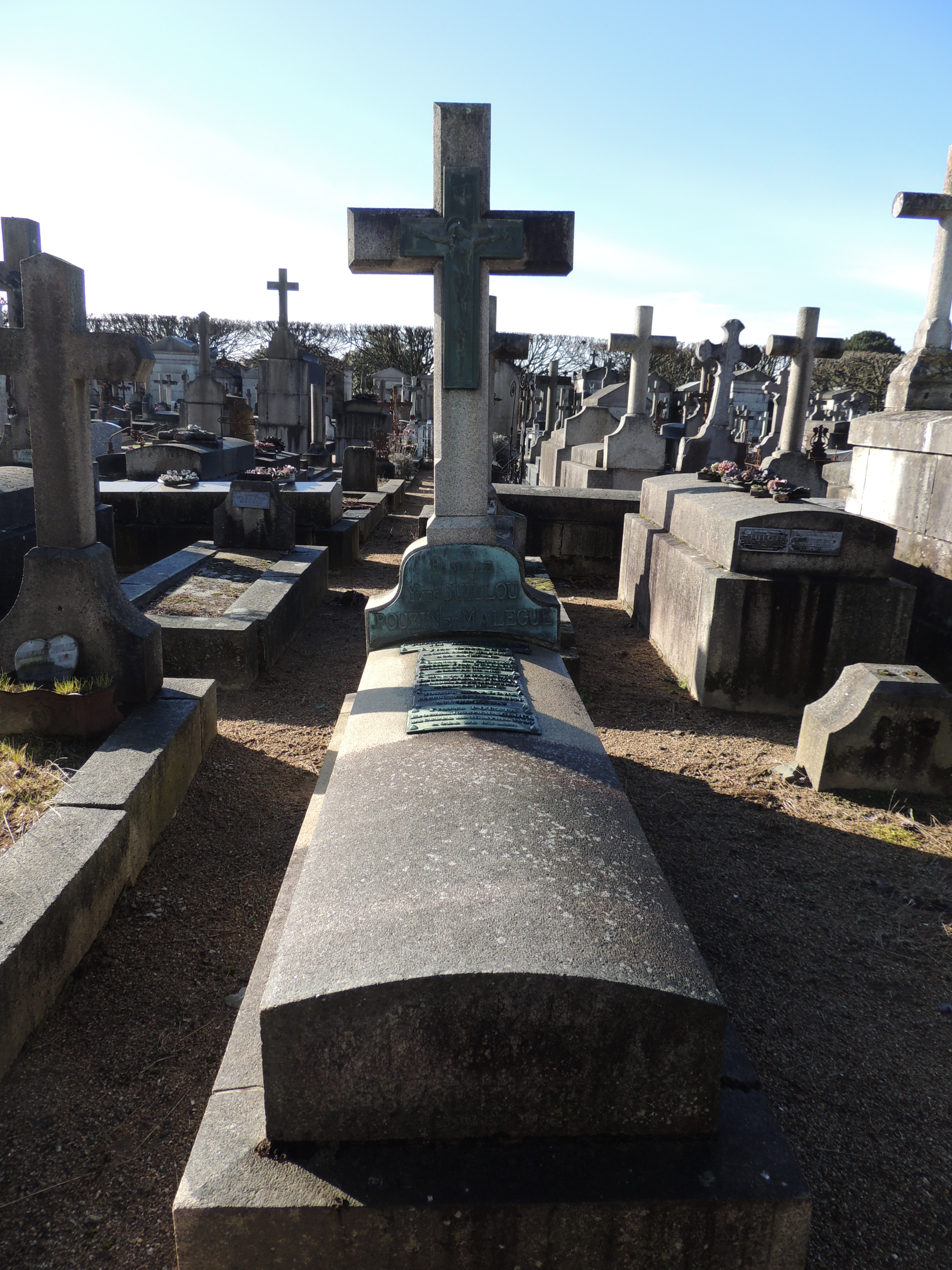
Grave of Yvonne Pouzin and Joseph Malègue.

She also deciphered a great portion of the manuscript of Pierres noires. Les classes moyennes du Salut, republished in 1958. Diagnosed with intestinal cancer, she died on 15 April 1947, after having undergone two operations. She was buried in Miséricorde Cemetery in Nantes. Her grave is part of a tour on the scientific history of Nantes. Her work dedicated to her husband (Yvonne Malègue-Pouzin, Joseph Malègue, Tournai, Casterman, 1947.), the first monograph about him, appeared some time after her death.

One lane of Nantes has, in her memory, her name associated with that of her husband, the "Street Doctor-Pouzin-Malègue".
