= Henri-Franck Beaupérin =

French organist and improviser

Henri-Franck Beaupérin (born 1968 in Nantes) is a French organist and improviser.

== Life ==
After being one of the last disciples of Gaston Litaize, Beaupérin studied with Michel Chapuis, Olivier Latry, Michel Bouvard, Loïc Mallié and Jean-Claude Raynaud at the Conservatoire de Paris, and completed his training with masters such as Jean Boyer, Louis Robilliard, Thierry Escaich, Ton Koopman and Jean Guillou.

Winner of the Tokyo and Lahti international competitions, Improvisation Prize at the Franz Liszt Competition in Budapest, he was revealed to the public in 1995 when he unanimously received the Grand Prix of interpretation of the first International Competition of the City of Paris.

Emeritus organist of the Cathedral of Angers, he leads an important musical development activity in this region: creation of the Academy of Improvisation at the Pays de la Loire Organ, the Organ Association in Pays de la Loire, the International Competition of Ancient Music in the Loire Valley.

Titular of the great organs of the Sylvanès Abbey, he is involved in the artistic programming of the Festival and of the Centre culturel de rencontre: concerts, masterclasses, Rencontres de l'Orgue aujourd'hui...

His activity as a concert performer led him to participate in the creation of shows that unite the organ with various artistic formations: the premiere of Thierry Escaich's First Organ Concerto under the direction of Jean-Jacques Kantorow, choreographic oratorio La Passion de Becket with Régis Obadia, ciné-concerts…

A leading performer of the symphonic repertoire and a sought-after improviser, he published the first edition of Raphaël Fumet's organ work (Delatour editions) and made many transcriptions for organ, including Franck's Prélude, Choral et Fugue and Jean-Louis Florentz' L'Anneau de Salomon.
