= Jules Désiré Colombe =

French blacksmith

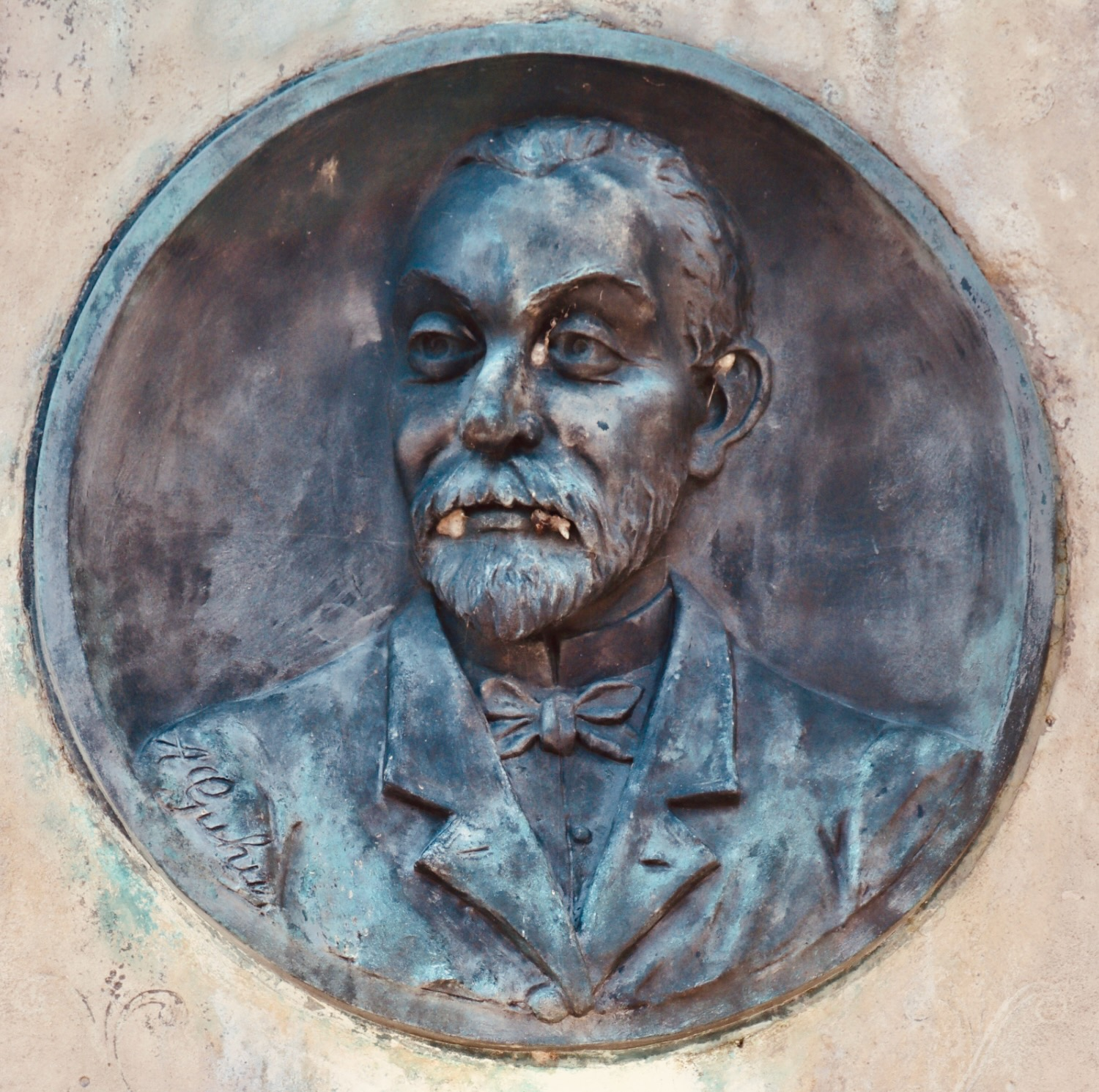
- Portrait on his tombstone
- Born: 16 May 1859; Bléville (Le Havre), France
- Died: 12 December 1902 (aged 43); Nantes, France
- Political party: French Workers' Party

Jules Désiré Colombe (1859–1902) was a French blacksmith, known as leader of the labour exchange's creation in Nantes in 1892 and part of Limoges congress in 1895. A street and a cultural building hold his name in Nantes.

== Biography ==
=== Early life ===
Jules Désiré Colombe was born in Bléville that is today part of Le Havre city, on 16th may 1859.

He established later in Nantes, as a blacksmith worker.

=== Member of Nantes municipal council ===
He sat on the Nantes Municipal Council from 1888 to 1892. First a member of the French Workers' Party and close to Charles Brunelière, one of the founders of Nantes socialism, he is known to be a unity supporter.

=== Leader in the creation of the labour exchange (Bourse du travail) in Nantes ===
He played a key role in the founding of the Nantes Bourse du Travail, for which he was the secretariat from its creation in 1892. This happens in historical context of federation of labour exchanges creation. On his proposal, three places were reserved for women on the General Council (Conseil général) in charge to vote the final bureau, and one place on the Executive Commission (Commission exécutive).

=== Secretary of national congress of French trade unions in 1894 ===
In September 1894, a national congress was held at Nantes : it was attended by 21 Bourses (776 trade unions), 30 federations (682 trade unions), and 204 trade unions which sent their own delegates. He was part of the opposants to the political and union line of his party by voting for the organization of a general strike.

=== Member of Limoges Congress which created General Confederation of Labour ===
The following year, in Limoges, a congress held after the union of workers' organizations achieved in Nantes. He was one of its national secretaries. Others former members of French Workers' Party were also present in Limoges, for instance : Édouard Treich, secretary of the Federation of Workers' Unions of Limoges (Fédération des syndicats ouvriers de Limoges), Jean-Baptiste Calvignac, miners in Carmaux mining company. The General Confederation of Labour (CGT) was founded in 1895, at the Congress of Limoges.

=== Later life ===
In 1895, he left the Secretariat of the Nantes Bourse du travail and set up a small blacksmith's workshop with two partners.

=== Death and legacy ===
He died in December 1902 at the age of 42.

He is buried in the Cemetery Miséricorde in Nantes.

His name was given to the street in which the second premises of the Nantes Bourse du travail were located.

== See also ==
=== Internal links ===
- Labour exchange
- Labour Exchanges Act 1909
- Labour council
- Labour movement
- Anarchism in France
- Fédération des Bourses du travail
- Fernand Pelloutier considered as the leader of the Bourses du Travail, in which he advocated for anarcho-syndicalism.

=== Sources ===
- Lehébel, Jacques (2012). Les premières années de la Bourse du travail de Nantes 1887-1895 [The early years of the Nantes labour exchange 1887-1895] (PDF) (in French). Association méridienne. p. 22.

=== Further reading ===
- Guin, Yannick (1976). Le mouvement ouvrier nantais : essai sur le syndicalisme d'action directe à Nantes et à Saint-Nazaire [The Nantes workers' movement: essay on direct action unionism in Nantes and Saint-Nazaire]. Textes à l'appui. Histoire contemporaine (in French). Paris: F. Maspero.
- Guicheteau, Samuel; Noyer, Manuella; Patillon, Christophe (2023). Dockers, une histoire nantaise : travailler et lutter sur les quais, XVIe-XXe siècle [Dockers, a Nantes story: working and fighting on the docks, 16th-20th century] (in French). Nantes: Éditions du CHT. ISBN 978-2-912228-40-6.
- Congrès national des syndicats de France (1894). Compte rendu des travaux du congrès tenu à Nantes du 17 au 22 septembre 1894 : 6e congrès national des syndicats de France [Report of the proceedings of the congress held in Nantes from September 17 to 22, 1894: 6th national congress of French trade unions] (in French). Nantes: impr. G. Schwob et fils.
