= Louis Robilliard =

French organist

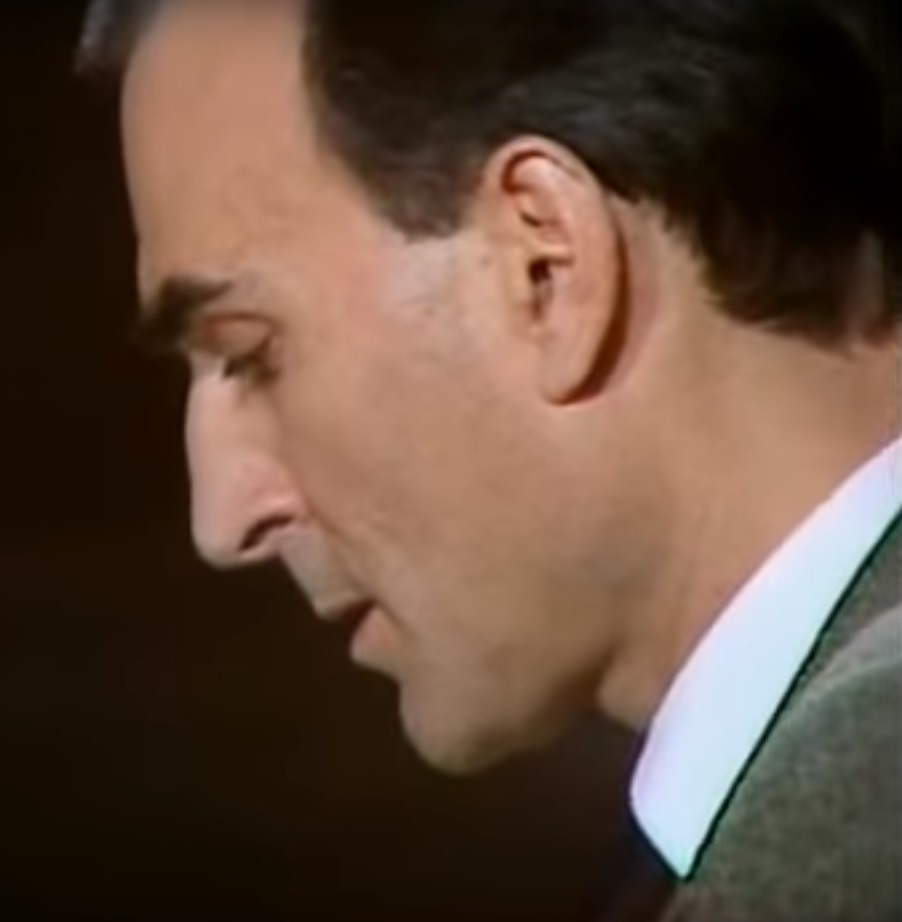
Louis Robilliard in 1976

Louis Robilliard (born 10 December 1939 in Beirut) is a French classical organist. He won the first prize for organ and improvisation unanimously awarded by the Conservatoire de Paris (1967).

== Discography ==
Max Reger: Introduction et Passacaille en ré mineur - Charles Widor: Toccata de la Ve Symphonie; History of the Organ, vol. 4, The Modern Age, DVD, ArtHaus Musik 102 153 (1991/1997)
