= Édouard Rist =

French physician

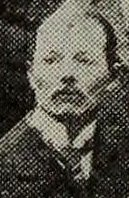
Édouard Rist at the Cannes Medical Conference 1920

Édouard Rist (16 March 1871, Strasbourg – 13 April 1956, Paris) was a French physician who specialized in tuberculosis research (phthisiology). He was the brother of economist Charles Rist.

In 1899/90, he served as an inspector of health and quarantine services in Egypt, and after his return to France, was named laboratory chief at the Hôpital Trousseau in Paris. From 1910 to 1937, he was a physician at the Hôpital Laennec, and concurrently served as a physician at the Dispensaire Léon Bourgeois (1912–37).

During World War I he was chef de service of typhoid and para-typhoid hospitals. In 1919, he was awarded the Army Distinguished Service Medal of the United States and made a commander of the Legion of Honour. In 1933, he became a member of the Académie de médecine, of which, he later served as its president. The "Clinique médicale et pédagogique Édouard Rist", located in the 16th district of Paris, is named after him.

== Selected works ==
- Études bactériologiques sur les infections d'origine otique, 1898 – Bacteriological studies on the origin of otic infections.
- Précis de pathologie exotique, (with Édouard Jeanselme), 1909 – Specifics of exotic pathology.
- La tuberculose, 1927 – Tuberculosis.
- Séméiologie élémentaire de l'appareil respiratoire, 1934 – Elementary respiratory symptomatology.
- Les Symptômes de la tuberculose pulmonaire (clinique, physiologie, pathologique, thérapeutique), 1943 – Symptoms of pulmonary tuberculosis.
- 25 portraits de médecins français, 1900-1950, (1955) – 25 portraits of French doctors, 1900–1950.
