= Pierre Dumoustier =

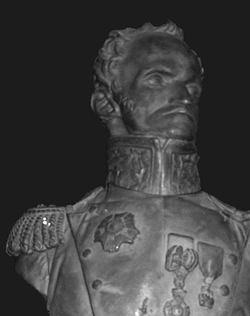
Bust of general Dumoustier.

Comte Pierre Dumoustier (17 March 1771 – 15 Jun 1831) was a French general and politician during the First Republic and First Empire. His name is inscribed in column H on the north column of the Arc de Triomphe (between avenue de la Grande-Armée and avenue de Wagram).

== Family ==
From a very old Protestant family originating from Loudun, Dumoustier was born in his parents' hôtel particulier on 22 rue des Cannoniers in Saint-Quentin. · His parents were Gabriel, a banker in Paris and textile merchant in Saint-Quentin, and his wife Louise Henriette Émilie (née Le Sérurier). Pierre's sister Gabrielle, married to Pierre-Jacques-Samuel Chatry-Lafosse, president of the Corps législatif, was mother of generals Jacques-Louis Chatry de Lafosse and Gabriel de La Fosse, and their other sister Marie-Adélaïde married Ferdinand Berthoud.

== Life ==
From 1782 to 1785 he studied at Tonbridge School in England before enlisting as a private in a requisition battalion at Saint-Quentin in 1793. That was merged into the 5th Hussar Regiment in the Army of the North on 1 October 1794 and he was wounded in September that year. At Rennes he met general Jean Frédéric Krieg, commander of the armée des côtes de Brest and the Armée des côtes de Cherbourg, and joined these armies as a provisional aide de camp in June 1794 despite not being an officer.

He was made a brevet sous-lieutenant of hussars in June 1796 and was attached to the guard of the French Directory that November. He was kept on in the Consular Guard, distinguished himself at the battle of Marengo and promoted to lieutenant (June 1797) and then captain (December 1798). Next, in August 1803, he was promoted to adjutant-commander and put in command of Napoleon's headquarters in the armée des côtes de l'Océan's camp at Saint-Omer, where he won praised from marshal Géraud Christophe Michel Duroc. In 1804 he was made colonel of the 34th Infantry Regiment, part of Suchet's division, and with it fought at the battles of Ulm, Austerlitz and Saalfeld.

At Jena he was wounded by a musket ball to the left leg after he and his regiment broke up a column of 3,000 grenadiers. He next fought at the battles of Pułtusk and Ostrołęka. On 30 December 1806 he was promoted to général de brigade and after this campaign set off for Spain in September 1808. He fought at the second siege of Saragossa. In April 1809 he returned to Germany as second in command of the foot chasseurs corps of the Imperial Guard under the command of Philibert Jean-Baptiste Curial. He fought at the battle of Essling, then commanded 1st Brigade of Curial's marching division of the guard at the Battle of Wagram. He returned to Spain in 1810 in command of four divisions of the 'Young Guard' and was promoted to général de division on 24 June 1811. he commanded 2nd Division of the 'Young Guard' at the battle of Lützen back in Germany - during the day his division relieved the village of Kaya and in the evening repelled a cavalry sortie then fought at Bautzen.

On 26 August 1813 he was in Dresden and commanded to repulse the enemy troops attacking the Flauen gate with an important gun. He sortied in command of 1st Division of the 'Young Guard' under fire, was wounded by grapeshot in the right leg and his horse was killed under him by five 'biscaïen' (large musket shots), but he remained on the battlefield until midnight despite the pain of his wounds. He was made a comte de l’Empire on 28 November 1813 and - on the First Restoration - declined an offer from the royal government to be made a member of the Order of Saint Louis in 1814.

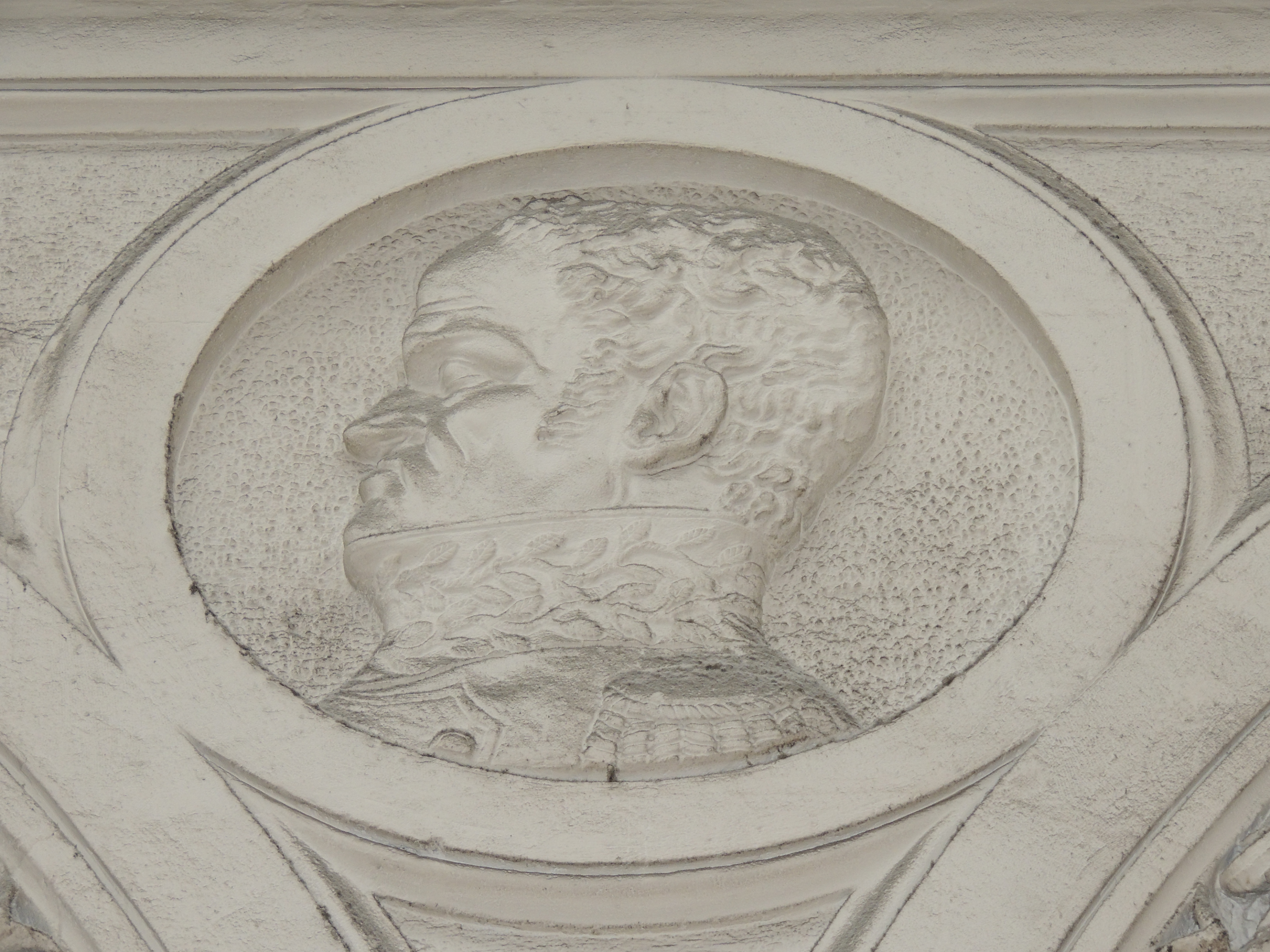
Medallion of Dumoustier in the Passage Pommeraye.

Later in 1814 he retired but during the Hundred Days Napoleon assigned him to the defence of Paris. He was elected to the chamber of representatives for the department of Loire-Inférieure on 12 May 1815 and was one of the commissioners chosen after the defeat at Waterloo to take the chamber's address to the army. He retired again on the Second Restoration and went into internal exile at Nemours, under royalist surveillance. When the inhabitants of Nantes rose up during the 1830 revolution they asked Dumoustier to lead them. Although the city's commander Desquinois had to retreat into his home with the authorities, the chamber of commerce took over the city government and made Dumoustier commander of the city's National Guard.

On 5 August 1830 Dumoustier replaced Desquinois and four days later a letter from the minister of war, signed by count Maurice Étienne Germain, commissioner to the war ministry, officially made Dumoustier commander of the 12th Military Division at Nantes. On13 August another letter from Maurice Étienne Germain informed Dumoustier that king Louis-Philippe I "gave full approval to all that you have done so far", invested him with "all powers" and authorised him "to take all measures you judge suitable".

On 25 April 1830 he was badly wounded in his left knee in a riding accident during a tour of inspection near Beaupréau, a wound from which he died in Nantes fourteen months later. He and Pierre Cambronne are both buried in square GG of the cimetière Miséricorde in Nantes, Place Dumoustier in the city centre is named after him and a medallion showing his bust is in the passage Pommeraye in the city.

== Sources ==
- "Pierre Dumoustier", in Charles Mullié, Biographie des célébrités militaires des armées de terre et de mer de 1789 à 1850, 1852
- "Pierre Dumoustier", in Adolphe Robert and Gaston Cougny, Dictionnaire des parlementaires français (1789–1891), Bourloton, Paris, 1889 Edition details Wikisource
