= Joseph Malègue =

French writer (1876–1940)

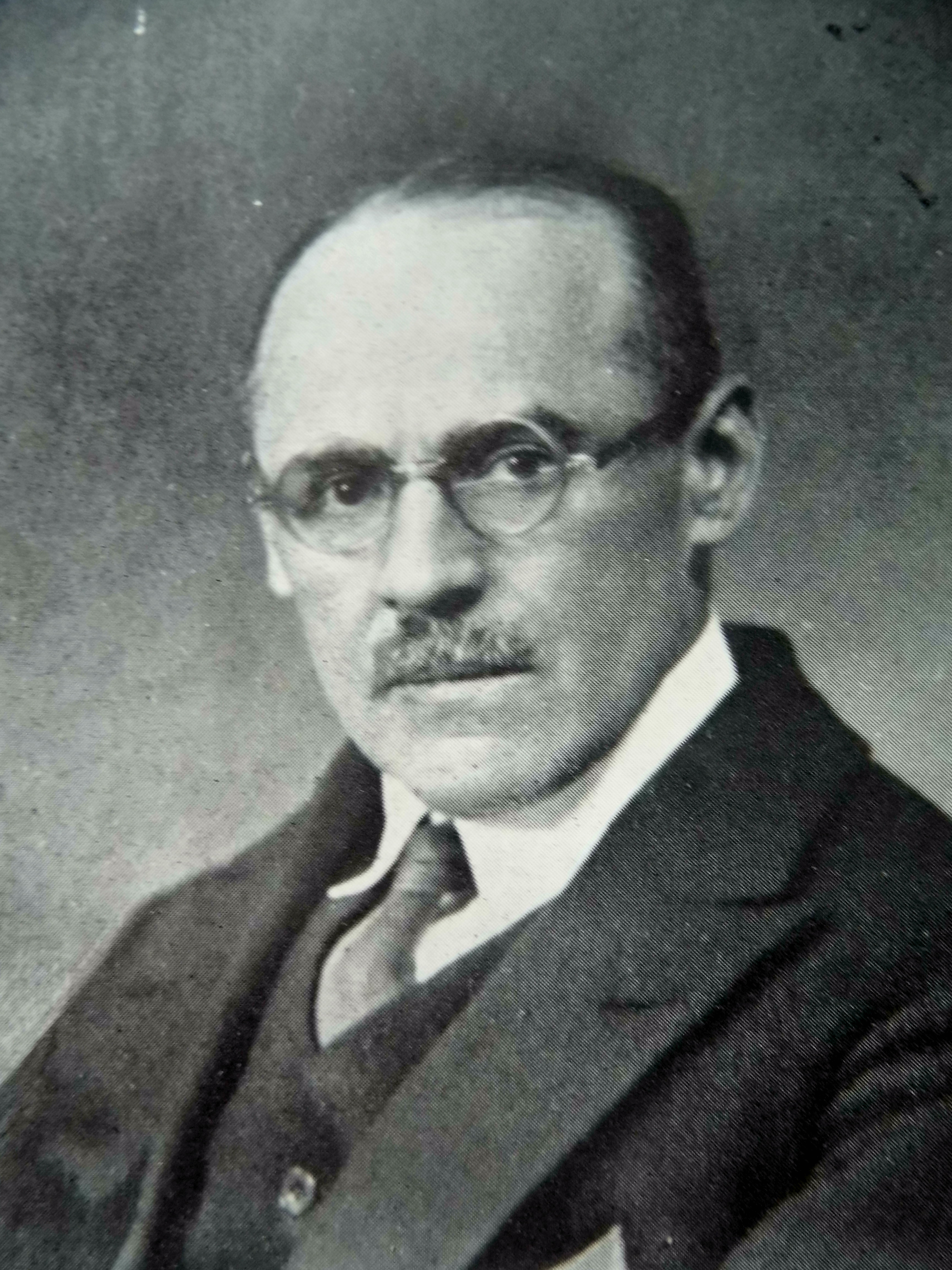
- Joseph Malègue (1933)
- Born: 8 December 1876; La Tour d'Auvergne, Auvergne
- Died: 30 December 1940 (aged 64); Nantes
- Occupation: Writer
- Writing career
- Period: 20th century
- Genre: Novel

Joseph Malègue (8 December 1876 – 30 December 1940), was a French catholic novelist, principally author of Augustin ou le Maître est là (1933) and Pierres noires. Les classes moyennes du Salut. He was also a theologian and published some theological surveys, as Pénombres about Faith and against Fideism. His first novel is, following the French historian of spirituality Émile Goichot, the most accurately linked to Modernism. Pope Francis quoted in several circumstances, among them in El Jesuita this Malègue's view about Incarnation : ‘’ It is not Christ who is incomprehensible for me if He is God, it is God who is strange for me if He is not Christ.‘’

== Life ==
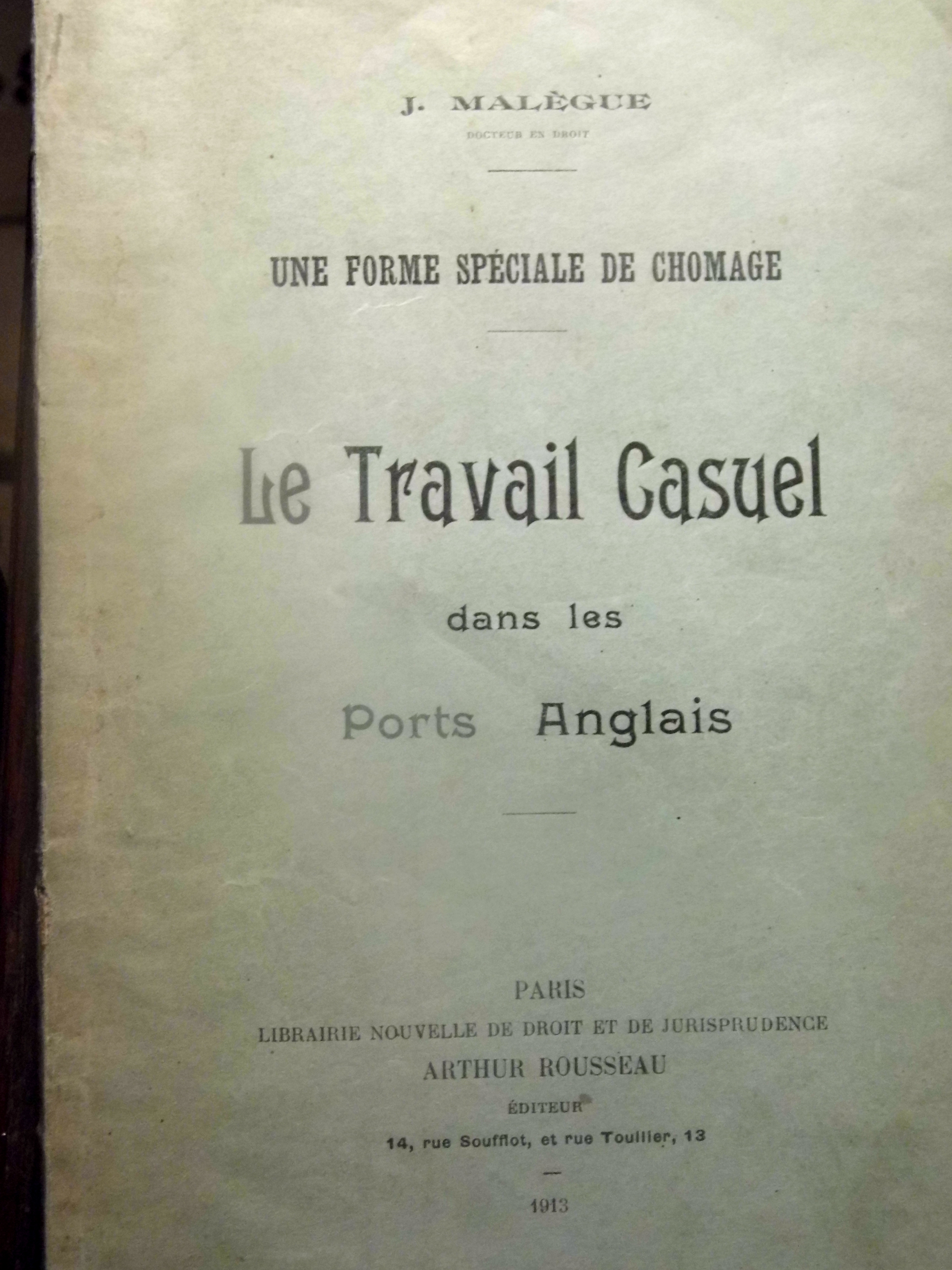
Malègue's Doctoral thesis in social economics about the casual work and unemployment by the English dockers

Malègue twice took the entrance examination for the École Normale Supérieure, in 1900 and 1901. His failure may have been due to poor health. Between 1902 and 1912, during several stays in England, he wrote a doctoral thesis about the high unemployment among casually employed English dockers : Malègue worked principally with Charles Gide. This was published in 1913 as Une forme spéciale de chômage : le travail casuel dans les ports anglais. In January 1912, during one such stay, he found the whole name of Augustin Méridier, the principal character in Augustin ou le Maître est là. The first handwritten pages of the book date from that month. During the First World War, once more because of his poor health, he was only able to work in an infirmary, despite his repeated attempts to enlist in a fighting unit. In 1917 he worked in the International Commission for relief in London. From 1922 until 1927, he taught at the École Normale, educating teachers for elementary schools of Savenay. In 1923 he married Yvonne Pouzin, a doctor of medicine, and they lived together in Nantes.

Malègue's novel Augustin ou le Maître est là was finished in 1930. The French philosopher Jacques Chevalier, a friend of Malègue, tried unsuccessfully to persuade Plon to publish the work, and in the end Malègue was forced to pay the publisher Spes for the production of the first 3,000 copies . This roman fluvial or roman fleuve of 900 pages immediately had a great success following the French literary critic Claude Barthe. Most French, Belgian, Walloon, and Swiss critics favoured the new novelist and his work, as did the most important literary critics of other countries in Europe, both Catholic and Protestant. Spes printed 10,000 copies at the end of 1933, 9,000 in June 1935, 6,000 in March 1940, and there were further large editions. Malègue was named the Catholic Proust by many French and Walloon literary critics, including Jacques Madaule and Léopold Levaux. He received many letters and among them communications from Paul Claudel, Henri Bergson, and Maurice Blondel. With this philosopher, he engaged in a philosophical correspondence, which has been studied by Geneviève Mosseray. He published Pénombres in 1939. In 1940, he was found to be suffering from stomach cancer and died in December that year. Despite all his efforts, he was unable to finish Pierres noires. Les classes moyennes du Salut.

Father interviewing the pope thinks the pope is referring to this second novel but the pope speaks about holy middle class in order to say that each christian is able to become a saint. And it is also the Malègue's opinion when he writes about holy middle class in Augustin ou Le Maître est là. Following the sources, it is Father Spadaro who made an error, in his footnote at this place.

Malègue used the words Salvation middle classes in the title of his second novel. And therefore, Malègue doesn't mean authentic holy people. The way he means the same idea as that the pope is (in Augustin ou Le Maître est là) : la sainteté ordinaire (banal holiness). Salvation middle class means the mediocre existence of many Christians who are in favour of the established order which would not bother those who are searching for earthly happiness, to be followed without obstacle by heavenly happiness.

This novel, which was more ambitious (almost 1,000 pages already written for the two first parts of the book and there would have been a third part, the most important), was published in 1958 after Malègue's death.

== Writings ==
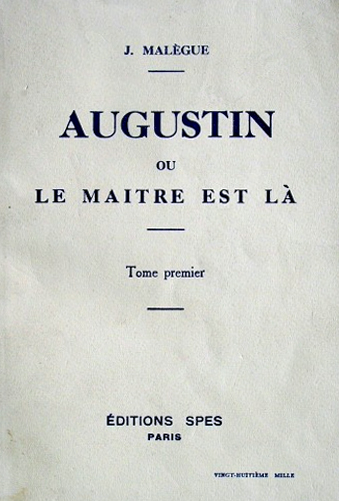
Front page of one of the first editions of the novel

Malègue's Augustin ou le Maître est là is unique among Catholic novels, following Victor Brombert, because, instead of writing about sex and sin as François Mauriac or Georges Bernanos, he poses the religious problem from an intellectual (not intellectualist) point of view. The hero is clearly victim of the libido sciendi. But Malègue insists not on his pride, but on the seduction of the mind. He is not against intelligence, on the contrary. On the contrary a writer as Bernanos is in a sense against intelligence. Victorm Brombert citates L'imposture and the statement Yes intelligence can penetrate everything, just as a light can go through the thickness of crystal, but it is incapable of moving, of embracing. It is a sterile contemplation.

The Augustin's return to his faith, in the end of the novel, is not an abdication of the intelligence, but a reconquest through pain and lucidity. This return to faith "sharply departs from Jean Barois" (of Roger Martin du Gard) because "Barois' physical and mental anguish provokes a state of moral depression and a yearning for childhood coziness" until in Augustin ou le Maître est là the return to faith (as in Jean Barois) and "suffering is an exalting experience which elevates him [Augustin] to the "icy zones of spiritual meditation." Reason or intelligence is not abandoned but only cold reason which is unable to meet the person, both of men and God, in the same sense as the philosophers Blaise Pascal or Henri Bergson, thinking that Jewish or Christian God is not the God of Aristotle. But, in doing so, the author wrote a long (900 pages in the first edition) and authentic novel "without loss of either dramatic or psychological intensity". Following him, the drama of intelligence appears in a different light in other Catholic novels.

If this author is a little forgotten, even in France, some literary critics continue to study his work, and among them William Marceau who wrote in 1987, Henri Bergson and Maurice Malègue, la convergence de deux pensées (French and Italian Studies, Stanford University, 1987), or Claude Barthe in 2004.

Jean Guitton told that a great reader of Malègue was the pope Paul VI Malègue was also appreciated by unbelievers or atheists as for instance Fernand Vandérem, a Jewish literary critic for Le Figaro, who wrote articles in the most laudatory terms.

== Worthy of interest again ==
Since Pope Francis quoted Malègue, a little part of the French public are more aware of his importance, which is the one of a great writer; the press has started reporting on him. The great Malègue's novel Augustin ou Le Maître est là was published for the last time in 1966. In January 2014, the great publishing house, Éditions du Cerf republished the novel, which was the first time Malègue's work was published by a major prestigious publishing house.

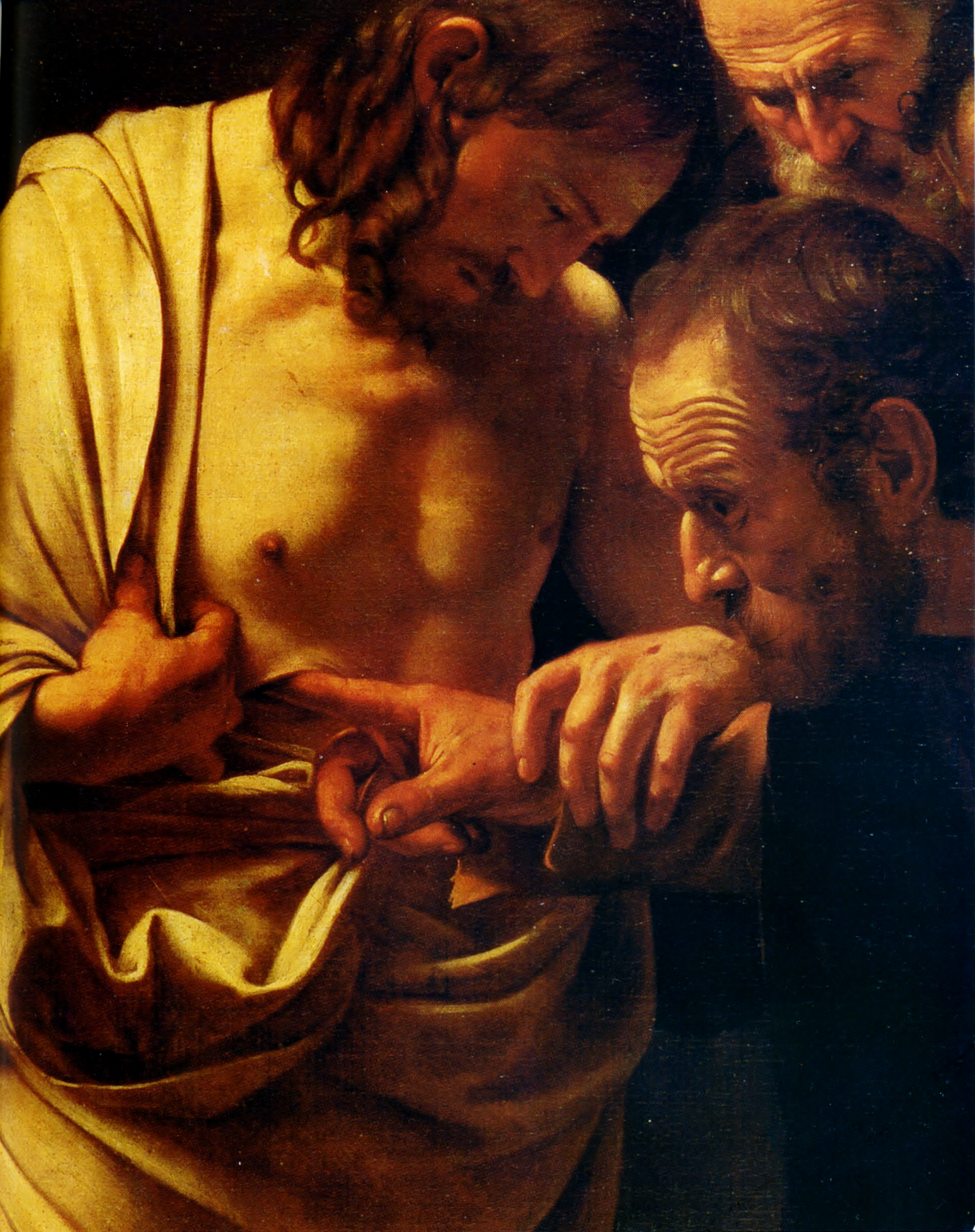
The incredulity of St Thomas (Caravaggio, front page of Augustin ou Le Maître est là in 2014

== Works ==
- Une forme spéciale de chômage: le travail casuel dans les ports anglais, Rousseau, Paris, 1913.
- Augustin ou le Maître est là, roman, Spes, Paris 1933.
- (German translation Augustin by Edwin Maria Landau, Benziger, Einsideln, 1956 and Italien translation, Agostino Méridier Società Editrice Internazionale, Torino, 1960. At that time, no English translation)
- Pénombres, glanes et approches théologiques, essai, Spes, Paris, 1939
- Pierres noires. Les classes moyennes du Salut, roman, Spes, Paris,1958
- Sous la meule de Dieu et autres contes, Spes, Paris, 1965

== Bibliography ==
- Dom Germain Varin : Foi perdue et retrouvée, la psychologie de la perte de la foi et du retour à Dieu dans "Augustin ou le Maître est là" de Joseph Malègue, Fribourg, 1953
- Article de Jean-Marc Brissaud dans Histoire de la littérature française du xxe siècle
- Charles Moeller, Malègue et la pénombre de la foi in Littérature du xxe siècle et christianisme. t. II La foi en Jésus-Christ, Casterman, Tournai-Paris, 1953
- Elizabeth Michaël (an American scholar but who wrote in French): Joseph Malègue, sa vie, son œuvre, Spes, Paris, 1957
- Léon Emery : Joseph Malégue romancier inactuel, Les Cahiers Libres, Lyon, 1962
- Jean Lebrec : Joseph Malègue romancier et penseur, H. Dessain et Tolra, Paris, 1969
- Di Wanda Rupolo, "Malègue e la 'Lege della dualità'" in Di Wanda Rupolo Stile, romanzo, religione: aspetti della narrativa francese del primo Novecento, Edizioni di storia e letteratura, Roma, 1985.
- Victor Brombert, The Intellectual Hero. Studies in the French Novel, 1880–1955, The University of Chicago Press, 1974, ISBN 0-226-07545-1.
- Jean-Pierre Jossua, Pour une histoire religieuse de l'expérience littéraire, volume 1, Beauchesne, Paris, 1985.
- William Marceau : Henri Bergson et Joseph Malègue, la convergence de deux pensées, Stanford French and Italian studies, Stanford University ,1987. ISBN 0-915838-66-4
- Henri Lemaître, Joseph Malègue in Dictionnaire Bordas de la littérature française, Bordas, Paris, 1994, pp. 522-523.
- Geneviève Mosseray, Au feu de la critique, J. Malègue lecteur de Blondel in Les Écrivains et leurs lectures philosophiques: Le chant de Minerve, publié par Bruno Curatolo, L'Harmattan, Paris, 1996.
- Claude Barthe, Joseph Malègue et le « roman d'idées » dans la crise moderniste in Les Romanciers et le catholicisme, Les cahiers du roseau d'or, n° 1, Editions de Paris, Paris, 2004. ISBN 2-85162-107-6
- Philippe van den Heede, Réalisme et vérité dans la littérature, Academic Press Fribourg, Fribourg, 2006.
- Pauline Bruley, Les écrivains face à la Bible, Paris, Éditions du Cerf, 2011, 272 p. (ISBN 9782204091831), « Le clair-obscur de la Bible dans deux romans de la crise moderniste, « Augustin ou Le Maître est là » de Joseph Malègue et « Jean Barois » de Roger Martin du Gard », p. 83‒98.
- Yves Chevrel, Imaginaires de la Bible - Mélanges offerts à Danièle Chauvin (dir. Véronique Gély et François Lecercle), Paris, Classiques Garnier, 2013, 354 p. (ISBN 978-2-8124-0876-2), « Romanciers de la crise moderniste. Mary A . Ward, Antonio Fogazzaro, Roger Martin du Gard, Joseph Malègue », p. 289-302.
