= Sandrine Voillet =

French art historian

Sandrine Voillet is a French art historian and television presenter. She is bilingual in English and French.

Voillet was raised in Nantes and was educated at the École du Louvre. She has also worked in the film industry.

She made her television debut in 2007 presenting Paris, a three-part series made for BBC 2 about the city, and wrote the accompanying book.

She has since made guest appearances on other documentaries about Paris such as The Supersizers Eat … the French Revolution (BBC 2, 2009), Monumental Challenge – Eiffel Tower (History Channel, 2011), Pricing the Priceless – Eiffel Tower (US National Geographic, 2011) and Edward Burra, a documentary presented by Andrew Graham Dixon (BBC, 2011).

She has written articles and features for the UK press including Lonely Planet, The Independent and Metropolitan. She is also a scriptwriter and won the Jury Special Prize at The French Screenwriting Festival in 2001.
