= Jean Marguerite Bachelier =

French notary and revolutionary (1751 – 1843)

Jean Marguerite Nicolas Bachelier (4 December 1751 – 10 August 1843) was a French notary and revolutionary.

== Biography ==
Bachelier was born into a bourgeois family in the parish of Sainte-Croix, Nantes. The son of an attorney for the Count of Nantes, he was destined for the priesthood and received his first tonsure in December 1771, but renounced his vows following the death of his elder brother. He succeeded his father, and was married in April 1781. In his role as an attorney, he also added the role of notary in the fief of the bishop, called the fief of Reguaires.

An early member of the Society of Friends of the Constitution, in 1792 he founded the Cordeliers Club of Nantes. In November 1792, he was elected to the municipality of Nantes. When the War in the Vendée broke out, a central committee was created in Nantes on 13 March; as a notable of the city, he was called by the municipality of the commune to run it. On 11 October 1793, this committee was abolished by the representatives Pierre Philippeaux, Pierre-Mathurin Gillet, and Albert Ruelle, and replaced by the Comité de surveillance révolutionnaire ("Revolutionary Oversight Committee") under the decree of 25 September. Along with the bishop Julien Minée, Bachelier was the only one of the founding members of the committee that remained in place.

Arrested with the other members of the committee, they stood trial by the Revolutionary Tribunal of Paris between October and December 1794. Bachelier was acquitted, and retired to Nantes in a house that he had constructed in the suburbs before the Revolution, and where he lived in isolation until his death at the age of almost 92 in August 1843, 15 years after his wife.

His only means of living were a small annuity of 1,100 francs, a product of the disposition of his assets, which diminished during the Revolution. After his death, the sale of his furniture only earned 500 francs. Charles Dugast-Matifeux wrote his obituary which appeared in the National de l'Ouest of 13 September 1843. It then appeared in some editions in the Almanac of Nantes in 1847.

== Works ==
- Mémoire pour les acquittés par le jugement du tribunal révolutionnaire séant à Paris, le 26 frimaire an III de la République, Angers, Jahyer et Geslin, (1795), 48 pages octavo
- Dialogue entre un royaliste et un patriote de 89, servant de supplément au mémoire des Nantais acquittés par le jugement, etc., Angers, Jahyer et Geslin, (1795), 16 pages octavo
- Cantiques et paraphrases d'hymnes de l'Église, en vers français, manuscript.
