= Raphaël Fumet =

French organist and composer (1898–1979)

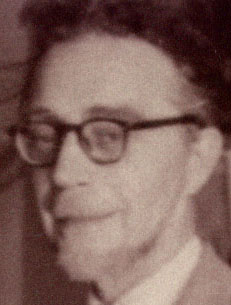
Raphaël Fumet

Raphaël Marie Paul Fumet (31 May 1898 – 1979) was a 20th-century French composer and organist.

== Biography ==
Born in Juilly (Seine-et-Marne), the son of composer Dynam-Victor Fumet (a student with César Franck, 1867–1949), brother of writer Stanislas Fumet, father of flautist Gabriel Fumet, Raphaël Fumet became a pianist and improviser at an early age.

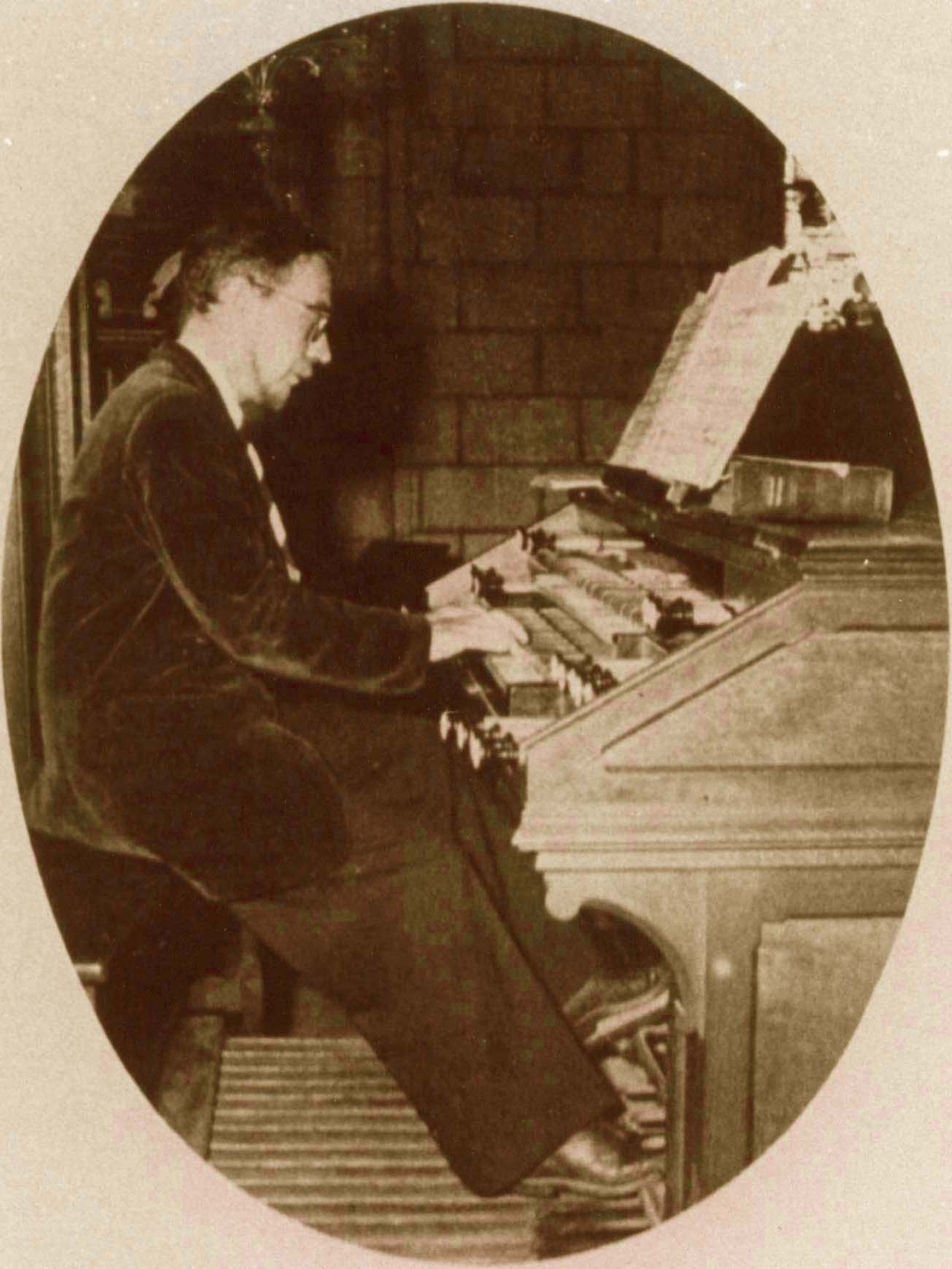
Raphaël Fumet

In parallel to his studies of musical composition with Vincent d'Indy at the Schola Cantorum de Paris, he was employed in many Parisian cinemas due to his ability to improvise on the organ during silent films. His charisma as a musician earned him the friendship of many artists, mainly in Montparnasse; he was especially connected with painters and sculptors as yet unknown as Soutine, Modigliani, Jeannette Hébuterne, Juan Gris, Joseph Bernard.

Raphaël Fumet withdrew first to the countryside in the famous College of Juilly in Seine-et-Marne where he remained ten years as Maître de chapelle. During the 1940 debacle, he left Jully with his family and moved to Angers where he became professor of piano and harmony at the conservatory, as well as organist at St. Joseph's Church.

== His work ==
The history of art has always been that of genius rather than that of the various academics seeking a "historically correct" aesthetic consensus. Raphaël Fumet's music is a remarkable illustration of this paradox.

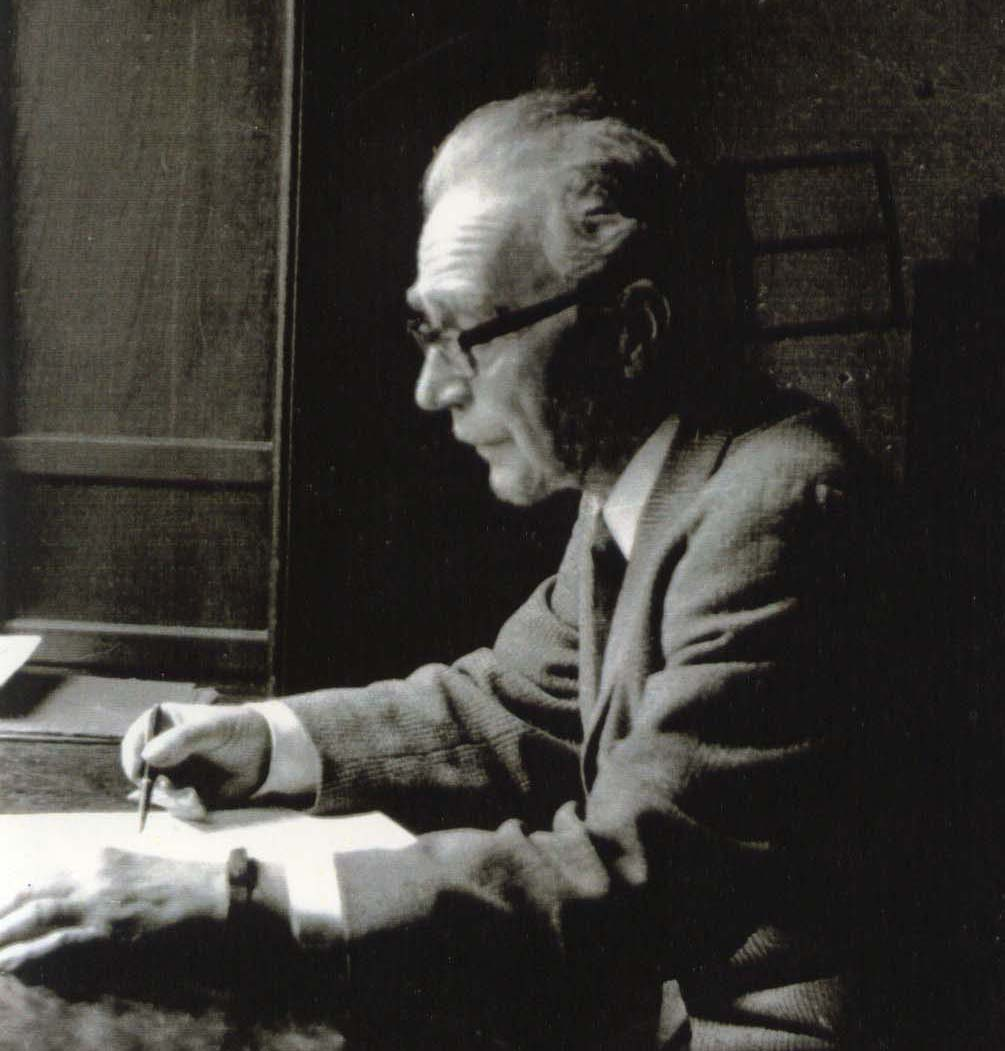
Raphaël Fumet

Although he possessed the qualities of an outstanding creator, he essentially lacked a fundamental social know-how at a time when the composer was totally dependent on the structures of the institution that governed his art in this very tough competition. This probably explains the extraordinary abandonment of his work, which has only just begun to be published. Of course, the fact that his music never broke with a lineage that could be located from Monteverdi to Stravinsky through his father Dynam-Victor Fumet whom he worshipped, did not facilitate his promotion at a time when any language that did not recommend itself to the avant-gardism was considered worthless.

Moreover, convinced that his music had little chance of being understood, Raphaël Fumet would do almost nothing for the diffusion of his work. "I no longer believe in the success of serious music," he wrote to a friend about one of his works, Le Colloque des Horizons, which unfortunately has disappeared. "The man of the century wants to enjoy in music anything other than harmony, in the proper and universal sense of the word. He wants sensual or "scientific" but never love that looks like trees and flowers, which makes him look old-fashioned and meaningless. It is true that the realization of a musical piece is such a work, such an undertaking on one's own life, that one has little time in its completion to take care of, if his dear daughter, the day of her presentation to the public, will have success at the ball..."

Listening to this work leads to consider that there is not a sense of history of unique and ineluctable art, but different directions sometimes contradictory with, in some cases, possible returns to previous horizons.

Raphaël Fumet died in Angers in 1979.

== List of works ==
- Several symphonic works including the Grande Symphonie de l'âme performed twice by the Orchestre national des Pays de la Loire under the direction of François Bilger and Marc Soustrot,
- Works for organs: Miserere – Toccata – Chant d’amour – Nuit – Prélude – Fugue – Choral à l’ancienne – Le sommeil des fleurs
- Pieces for piano,
- String quartet premiered by the Via Nova Quartet and revived by the New Budapest String Quartet,
- Wind quintet premiered at Radio France by members of the Orchestre National,
- Works for flûte,
- Various chamber music works...

== Recordings ==
Symphonie de l'Ame
Orchestre du Palais de Tauride - Saint-Pétersbourg. Conductor Mikhail Golikov. HYBRID'MUSIC H1830 (released in July 2013)

Intégrale de l'œuvre pour flûte
with Gabriel Fumet, Benoît Fromager, Philippe Pierlot, Hubert de Villèle (flutes)
Désiré N'Kaoua, Ichiro Nodaïra, David Berdery (piano)
Gérard Caussé (viola), Michel Poulet (cello)
Label : Marco Polo (Naxos) - Ref : 8.225295 (released on 18 February 2005)

Hommage à Raphaël Fumet
with Bruno Rigutto (piano), Gérard Caussé (viola), Gabriel Fumet (flute), Jean Mouillère (violin), Jean Galard (organ), Ichiro Nodaïra (piano).
Orchestre de chambre Jean-Jacques Wiederker with Anne Wiederker (violin solo)
ARION (ARN68475) (released on 12 April 1999)

L'œuvre pour orgue
with Henri-Franck Beaupérin (organ), Gabriel Fumet (flute), Hervé Noël (trumpet)
Ligia Digital (Lidi 0109103-01) (released on 4 February 2002)

L'œuvre pour orgue by Raphaël Fumet & Dynam-Victor Fumet
with Jean-Paul Imbert (organ)
Cybelia (CY848) (released in 1989)

== Bibliography ==
- Raphaël Fumet ou la musique de l'âme / Bernard LEUTHEREAU. Mémoire de maîtrise en Musicologie. (Université Paris IV-Sorbonne. 1984)

== See also ==
- Dynam-Victor Fumet (his father)
- Stanislas Fumet (his brother)
- Gabriel Fumet (his son)
