= Pierre Mauget =

French footballer (born 1984)

Personal information
- Full name: Pierre Mauget
- Date of birth: April 6, 1984 (age 42)
- Place of birth: Nantes, France
- Height: 1.91 m (6 ft 3 in)
- Position: Defender

Team information
- Current team: Vertou
- Number: 4

Youth career
- –1999: FC Nantes
- 1999–2002: Angers SCO

Senior career*
| Years | Team | Apps | (Gls) |
| 2002–2003 | Angers B | 31 | (0) |
| 2003–2004 | Angers SCO | 1 | (0) |
| 2004–2005 | AS Angoulême | 26 | (2) |
| 2005–2012 | Carquefou | 46 | (2) |
| 2012– | Vertou | | |
- * Club domestic league appearances and goals

Pierre Mauget (born April 6, 1984) is a French professional footballer, who currently plays in the Championnat de France amateur for USSA Vertou.

== Career ==
He played one game for Angers SCO in the 2004–2005 season in the Ligue 2.
