= Miséricorde Cemetery =

Cemetery in Loire-Atlantique, France

Coordinates: 47.223°N 1.568°W

Cemetery Miséricorde
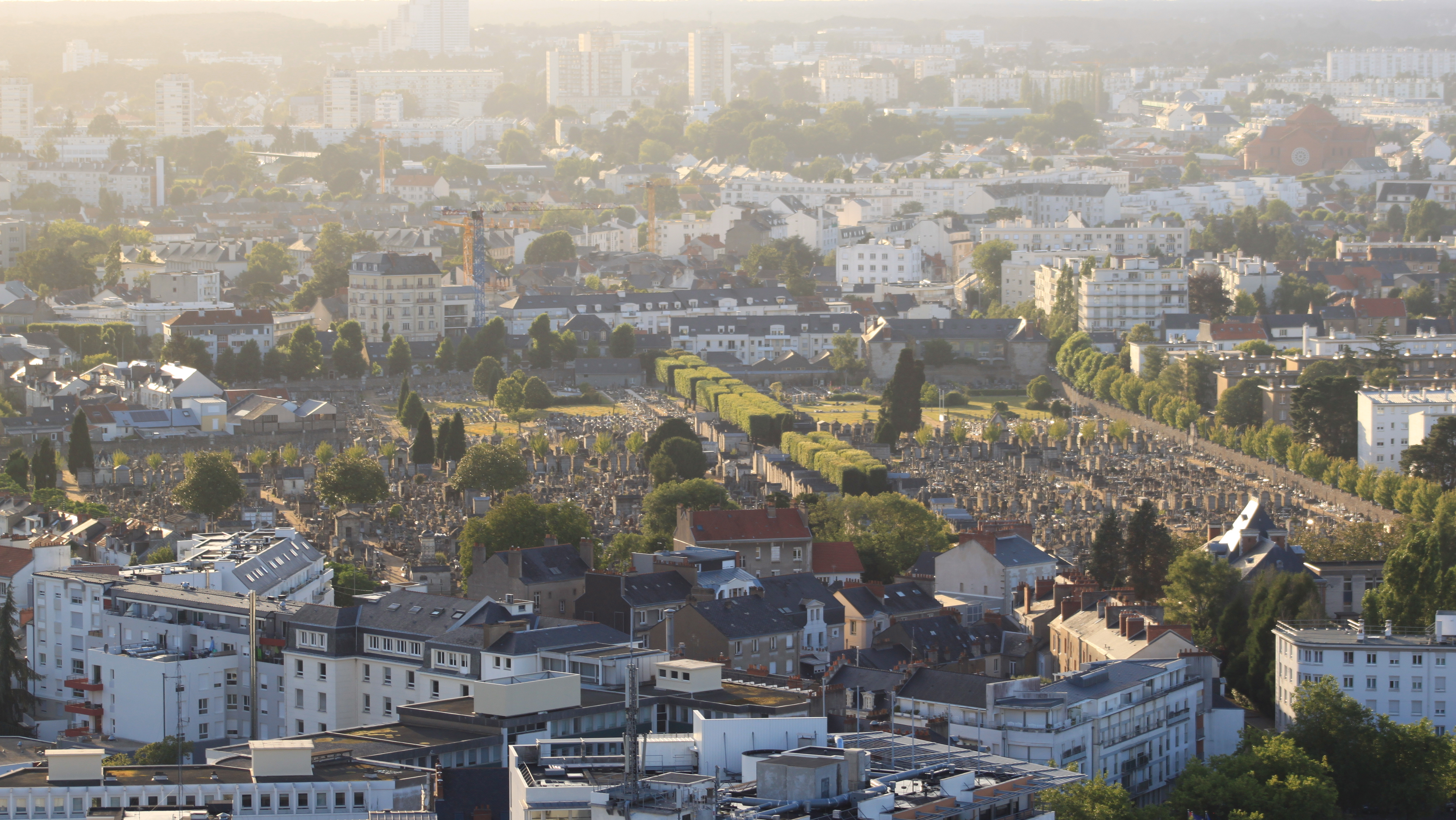
- Cemetery Miséricorde, as seen from Tour Bretagne, Nantes
- Interactive map of Cemetery Miséricorde

Details
- Established: 1793
- Location: Nantes
- Country: France
- Size: 9 ha (22 acres)

Miséricorde Cemetery is one of the major cemeteries in Nantes, France. It is located in the Hauts-Pavés - Saint-Félix district. It was opened in 1793 and over 10,000 people were buried there between then and 2010, such as Pierre Dumoustier.

== Gallery ==
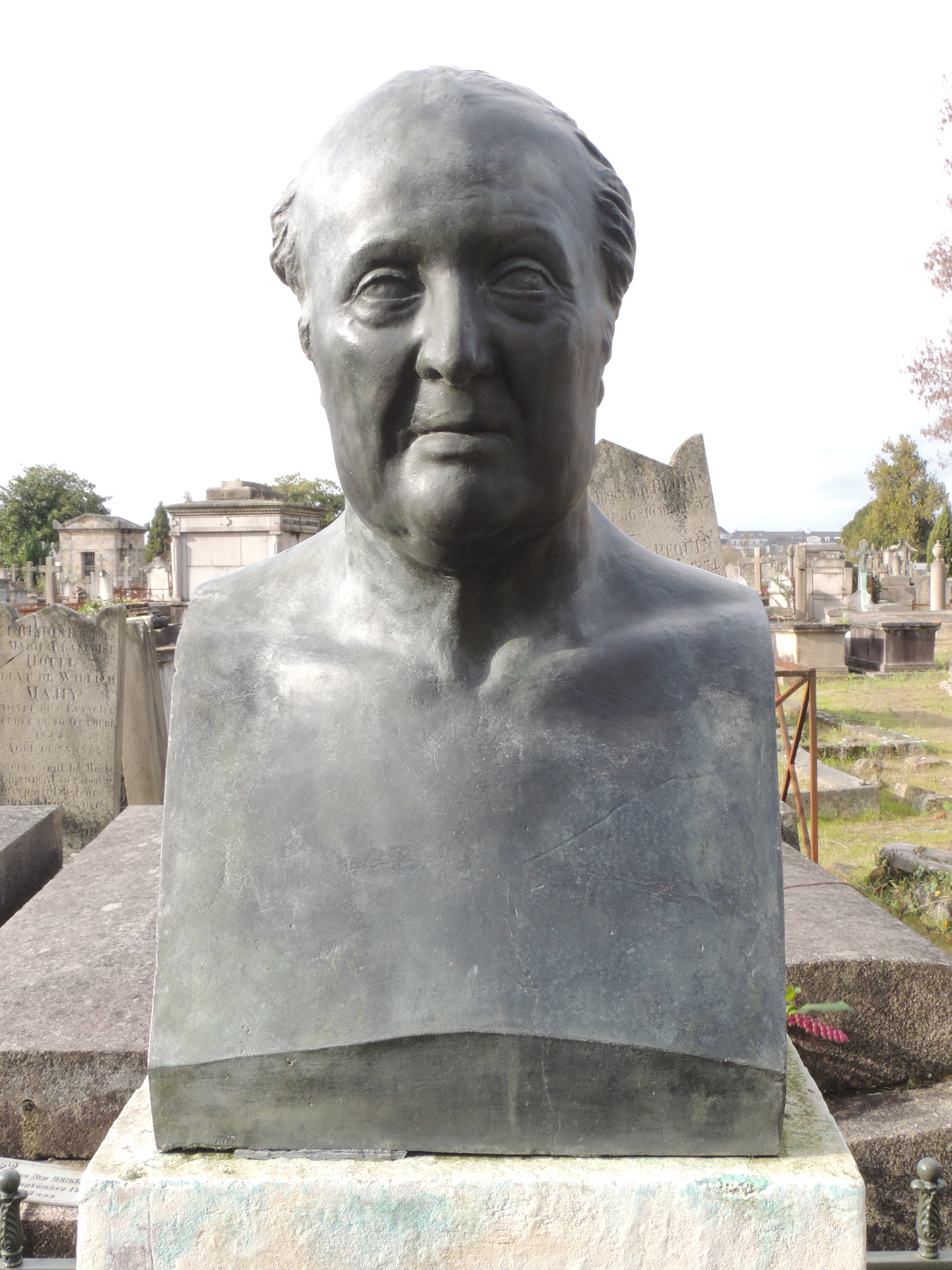
Bust of Philippe Gengembre

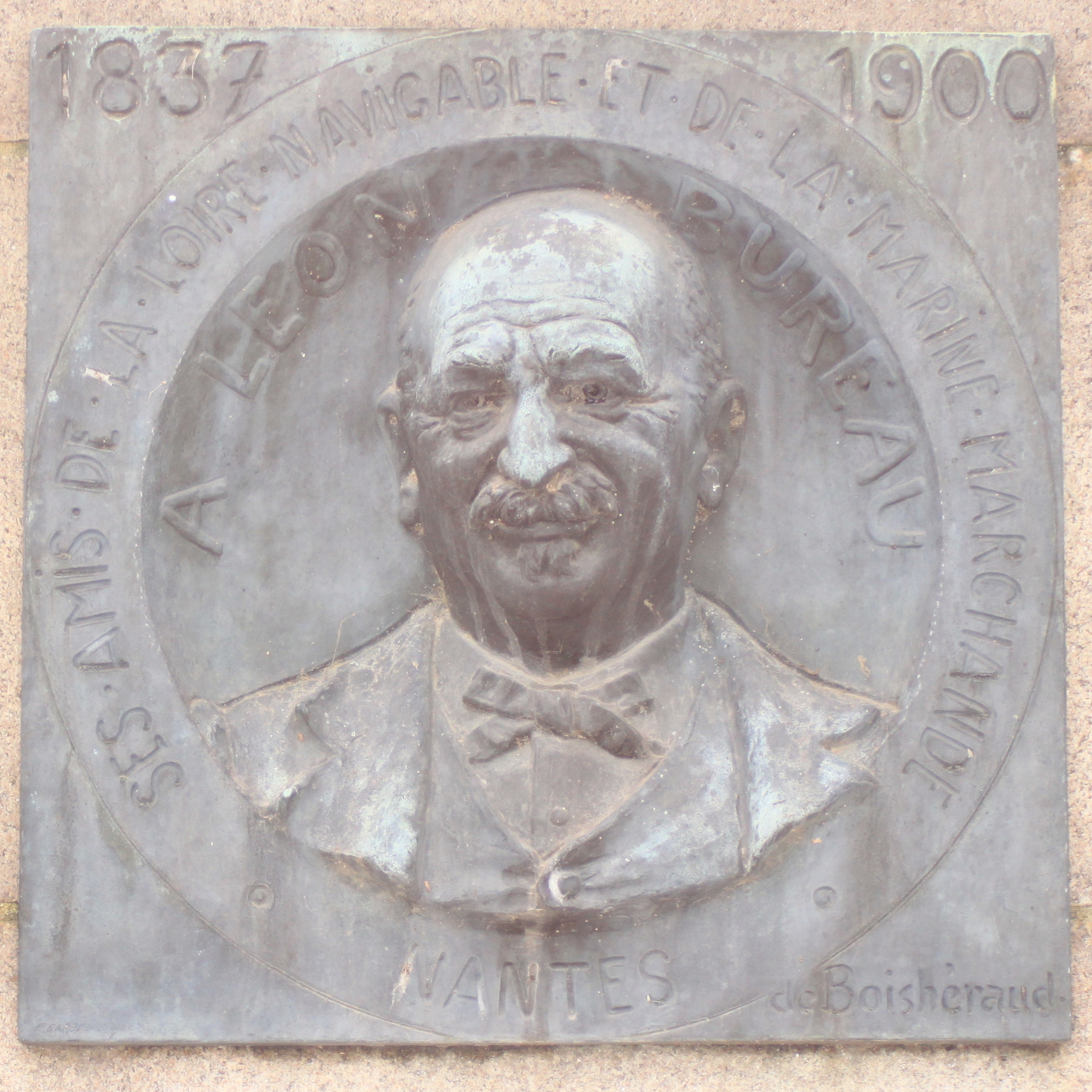
Léon Bureau

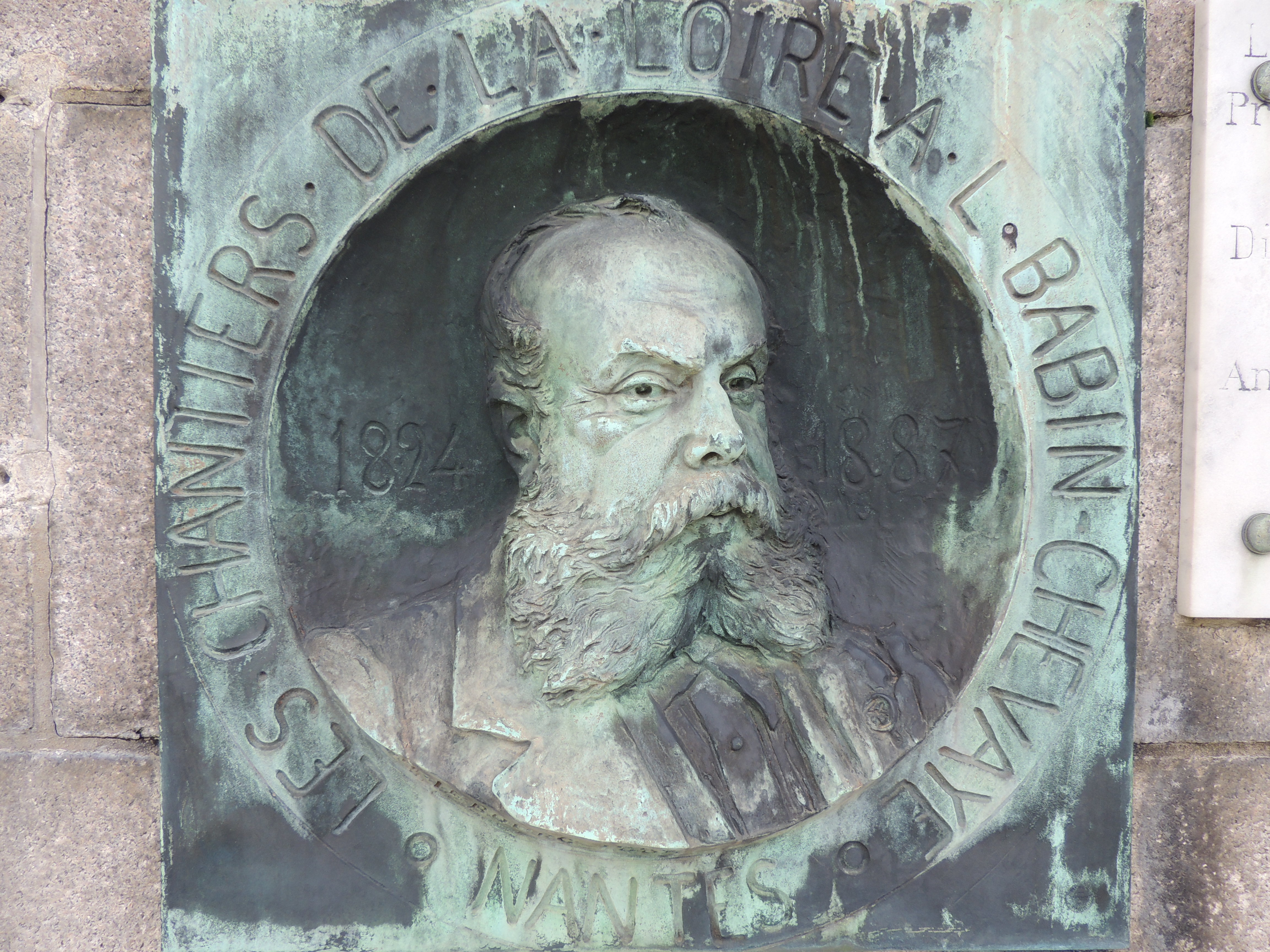
Louis Babin-Chevaye

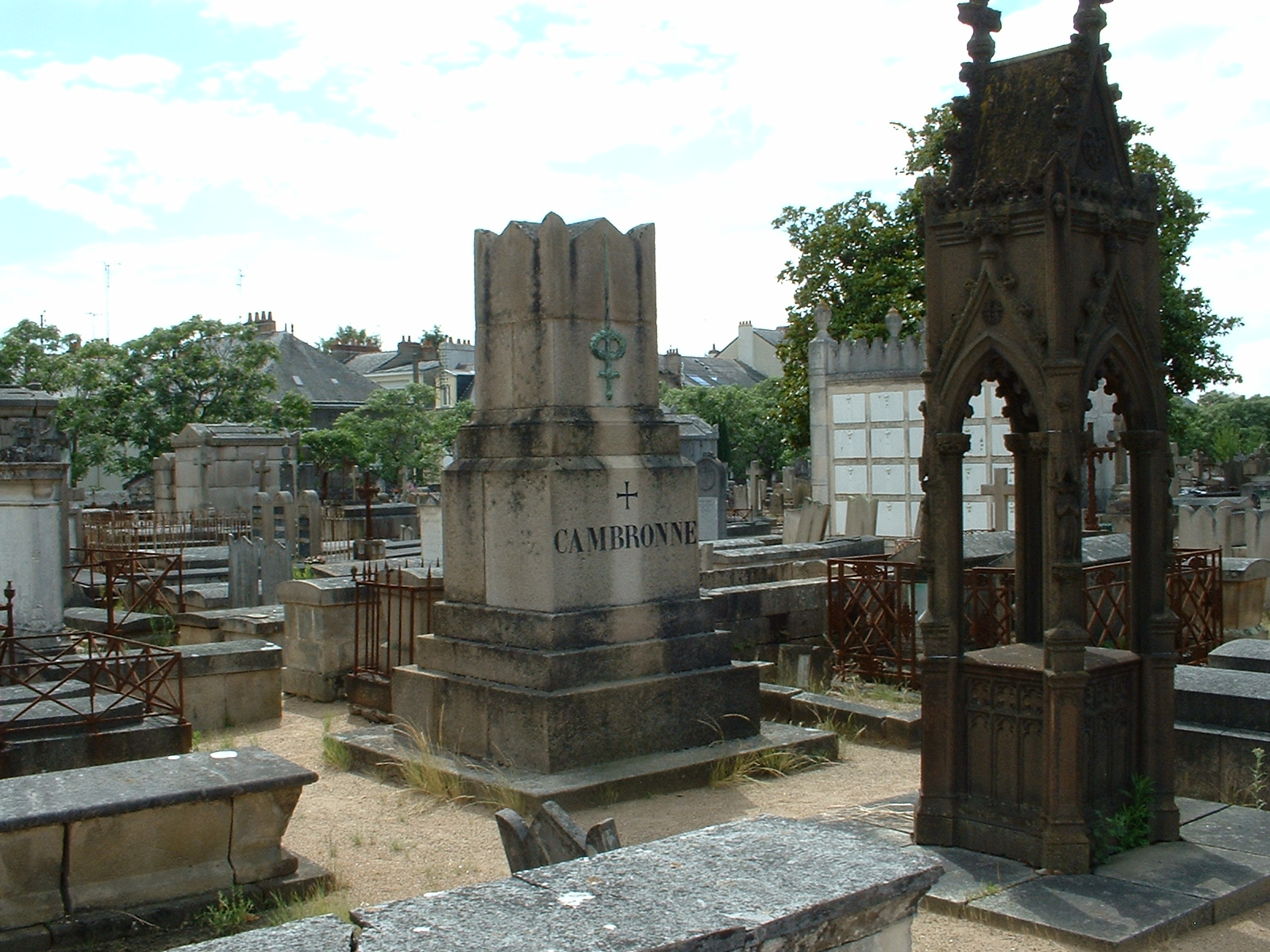
Grave of Pierre Cambronne

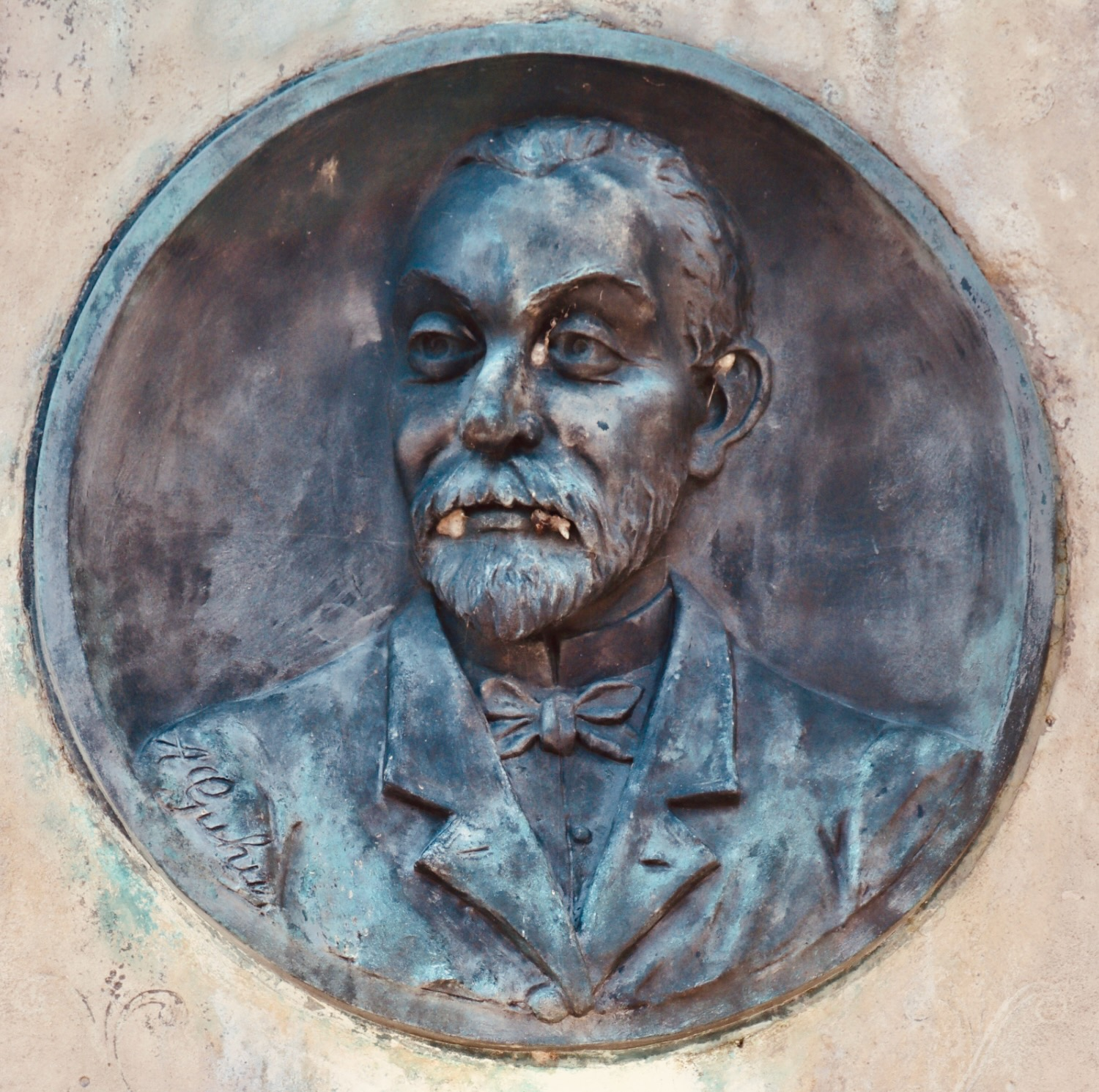
Jules Désiré Colombe

== Sources ==
- Cérède, Agathe (2021). "Cimetière de Miséricorde". Nantes patrimonia (in French).
