= Jean-Pierre Grünfeld =

French nephrologist

Jean-Pierre Grünfeld is a French nephrologist. He was a doctor at the Necker-Enfants malades hospital and a professor at the University of Paris Descartes (Paris V). He is Membre correspondent of the French Academy of sciences (elected 1986) and a foreign correspondent member of the Royal Academy of Medicine of Belgium (elected 1996). He is a Chevalier (Knight) of France's Legion of Honour (1995).

He is the author and co-author of more than 300 scientific publications.

== Cancer plan ==
In February 2009, Professor Jean-Pierre Grünfeld submitted to President Nicolas Sarkozy his proposals for giving "new impetus" to the fight against cancer, following criticisms made by the Court of Auditors and the High Council of Public Health against the Cancer Plan 2003-2007.

== AIRG-France ==
Jean-Pierre Grünfeld is Honorary President of the Scientific Council of AIRG-France (Association pour l'Information et la recherche sur les maladies Rénales Génétiques) of which he is one of the founders, with Dr Ginette Albouze and Ghislaine Vignaud.

== Books ==
- Médecine de la femme enceinte, by William M Barron, Marshall D Lindheimer, John M Davison, Jean-Pierre Grünfeld. Flammarion Medicine (January 4, 1994). (ISBN 2257102258)
- Cas cliniques en néphrologie-urologie, by Jean-Pierre Grünfeld and Bertrand Dufour. Medical Flammarion (January 8, 1992). (ISBN 2257104676)
