= Dynam-Victor Fumet =

French composer and organist

Dynam-Victor Fumet (4 May 1867 – 2 June 1949) was a French composer and organist.

== Life ==
Born in Toulouse in 1867, son of a very strict watchmaker, Dynam-Victor Fumet began his musical studies at the municipal Conservatory where his exceptional talents were very quickly recognized, and where he received all the possible prizes. At the age of 16, he entered the Paris National Conservatory, where he studied organ with César Franck and composition with Ernest Guiraud. The city of Toulouse voted him a scholarship to finish his studies in Paris, and he was sent off to the capital city accompanied by the municipal band.

At first his studies in Paris were pursued with hard work, but once finally freed from his father's stifling education, he soon began to frequent anarchist groups (Louise Michel, Prince Kropotkine, Jean Grave, Charles Malato). He continued none-the-less his musical studies at the conservatory, where his fellow students nicknamed him "Dynam", probably both because of the dynamic way he played and because of the way he lived. At 19 he entered the competition to obtain the "Prix de Rome", was congratulated by Reyer and complimented by Saint-Saens, but did not win the prize, perhaps for political reasons: a morning newspaper had denounced his anarchist tendencies. A stinging failure, and scandal in Toulouse: the city decided to cut off the libertarian's scholarship and his father refused to see him. He still continued his studies at the conservatory, and César Franck, who loved the youngest of his students and knew he was having financial difficulties, managed to have him hired as accompanist on the organ at the Sainte-Clotilde church where he was principal organist.

For a while, Fumet was the orchestra conductor at the "Chat Noir", but he soon quit and left the post to his friend, Erik Satie. It was shortly after this period that he became interested in spiritism and became a well-known medium. After a suicide attempt, from which he miraculously survived, he regained his faith in God, and under the influence of Léon Bloy regained his faith in Christianity. He became interested in the occult sciences and the Christian kabbalists, and began meeting with people like the Duchess of Pommard, Saint-Yves d'Alveydre, Stanislas de Guaita, etc. During this same period of time he met Verlaine, with whom he became close friends since they used the informal "tu" forms between them.

After a turbulent voyage to South America where he was hired as a conductor, he came back to Paris and married into a family close to the founder of the Theosophical Society, Hélène Blavatsky. Named principal organist at the Sainte-Anne-de-la-Maison-Blanche church, he began a discrete career, even though his improvisations attracted large crowds. It was there that he composed a large number of works for the Church, which he premiered on every important holiday; many of these works have been lost.

His son, Raphael (1898–1979), was also a noted organist and composer.

== Works ==
It is difficult to understand Fumet's music while ignoring his mysticism, even if his music holds itself up by its forms and intrinsic qualities. The difficulty comes perhaps from its refinement, which excludes the facile effects that please audiences and the general public so easily. This extraordinarily talented musician refused to use what he considered common tricks in his compositions; this did not make his music easy for the general public to understand. On top of that, possessed by his spiritual calling which gave him, until the end of his life, centers of interest other than his musical career, he soon became completely isolated from the fierce musical profession, which requires constant social interaction.

Fumet mostly invents his own forms, purposely going beyond the classical ones. Coming from the French school, to which he owes his ease in the use of forms and continuous modulation, he possesses a sense of harmony, rhythm, and strong and subtle melodies which distinguish him from the major musical trends from before and after the war.

"The purpose of art", he explained in a letter to a friend, "is to humanize universal life, that is to say to make it proportional to man's deposed royalty". He added that "art became a need of love ever since man was no longer as grand as the universe he looks at. He calls the universe to himself, and it is thus that works come into being. One therefore needs eternity to understand it, needs to feel his exile in order to give painful birth to living truth."

At the end of his life, surprised by the institutions' indifference towards his music, this spiritual and refined composer explained, not without humor, that Heaven held against him the excesses that had allowed him to create his works.

== Selected works ==
As of 2009, there is no definitive catalogue of Fumet's work. The list below only contains a few of his works, with large omissions in chamber music (15 pieces overall) piano (71 piece) and organ (39 piece) sections.

=== Orchestral ===
- La lumière sur le sentier
- Le sabbat rustique (1904)
- Le cantique du firmament (1911)
- Transsubstantiation (1913–1920)
- "Eli, Eli, lamma sabacthani?" (1914–1940)
- Les trois âmes (1915–1917)
- Le triptyque des légendes (1918)
- Le conciliabule des fleurs (1921)
- Libération (1921)
- Marche funèbre (1922)
- Notre mirage, notre douleur (1922)
- Vénus sortant des eaux (1934)
- Aria (1938)
- Hiératique (1940)
- Le sommeil d’Adam (1940)
- Tourbillon (1940)
- Voie lactée (1941)
- La prison glorifiée (1943)

=== Vocal ===
==== Choral ====
===== Masses =====
- La messe mariale
- La messe du Christ-Roi
- La messe des oiseaux
- Requiem

===== Dramatic works =====
- Oratorio Sancta Genovefa (1918)
- Opera Le Charme Maudit (unfinished; manuscript unusable)

===== Other pieces =====
- Les glaneuses "Choeur égyptien"
- Joies floréales
- Les anges du soir
- Les voix mystiques
- O doux printemps aimé
- Pater noster
- Un bel ange du ciel
- Il est tout petit
- Les saisons
- Printemps
- Ave Maria
- Cantiques à Marie

==== Solo vocal ====
- Berceuse (1890)
- Ave verum (1899)
- Le verbe des nuits (1899)
- O salutaris (1899)
- Un dimanche: Petite légende (1904)
- Je me languis (1907)
- Légende marine (1907)
- Refloraison (1907)
- Sérénade faunesque (1907)
- Trouble d'âme (1907)
- Verbe d'amour: Diction symphonique (1907)
- Sur les ailes de notre amour (1949)

=== Chamber music ===
- String Quartet (1912)
- Piano Trio (1943)

=== Solo instrumental ===
==== Organ ====
- Canticum novum (1914)
  1. Marche des Chevaliers célestes
  2. Fuga quasi Fantasia
  3. Transsubstantiation
  4. Le Voile de Marie
  5. Adoration
  6. Le Saint Sacrement
- Adam et Eve
- Aria
- Au firmament
- Au tombeau du Christ
- Feu de Gloire
- La lumière qui vient
- L'endormement du petit Jésus
- Le baiser intérieur
- Le conciliabule des arbres
- Le sommeil des innocents
- Le tourment de Marie
- Les chariots d'Israël
- Litanies d'orgue
- Pâques d'or
- Prélude en mi bémol mineur
- Prélude et Fugue en la bémol majeur
- Prélude printanier

==== Piano ====
- Les enlisements d'en-haut (c. 1885)
- Douloureux pèlerinage (c. 1885)
- Les libellules (1899)
- Joie
- 6 études caractéristiques de haute technique musicale (1931)

== Reception ==
All of the CDs devoted to Dynam-Victor Fumet's works have received favorable reviews, and sometimes extremely laudatory ones, whether for his piano works or for his organ works. In Diapason, Jean Roy talks about chefs-d'oeuvres on the recording of his pieces for piano played by the wonderful Japanese pianist Akiko Ebi. His works for organ received the same kind of praise, mentioned in the same magazine by Michel Roubinet as played by Jean-Paul Imbert and by Frédéric Denis, as well as in prestigious publications such as "New Record Guide" or "Fanfare" in the United States.

Renowned French critic Bernard Gavoty, who heard Fumet play, later commented on the composer's work:

Do you know Dynam-Victor Fumet? He was an organist unique to his century. A disciple of César Franck, he also had a talent for improvisation that transformed him into a genius. When I was young, I heard him once at the organ of the Sainte-Anne-de-la-Maison-Blanche church where he was the principal organist. That day I had one of the most overwhelming emotions of my life. To be spellbound; do you know what that means? Taken, engulfed by a maelstrom, emptied of all personal substance but filled in place with a river of fire that delighted and consumed me. All those who heard Fumet felt impressions similar to mine. His name has never been erased from my memory.

== Recordings ==
L'œuvre pour piano de Dynam-Victor Fumet
Piano : Akiko Ebi
INTEGRAL Classic – INT 221.121

Hommage à Dynam-Victor Fumet (œuvres pour orgue)
Orgue : Frédéric Denis
WERGO – ORG70082

Le Sabbat rustique and Le Mystère de la terre Orchestre du Palais de Tauride – Saint-Pétersbourg. Mikhail Golikov, conductor. HYBRID'MUSIC H1830 (January 2013)

Véronique Fumet-Béjars, his great-granddaughter has recorded some of his works, as well as those of her grandfather, Raphael, arranged for solo piano:

Bach – Brahms – Fumet (2015) includes Transsubstantiation and Pâques d'or and Raphael Fumet's Prelude and Fuge in C Sharp Major and L'ange des bois

Le conciliabule des arbres(2015) includes Le conciliabule des fleurs and Le baiser intérieur and Rapheal Fumet's Le sommeil des fleur
