= Brigitte Grésy =

French gender equality official

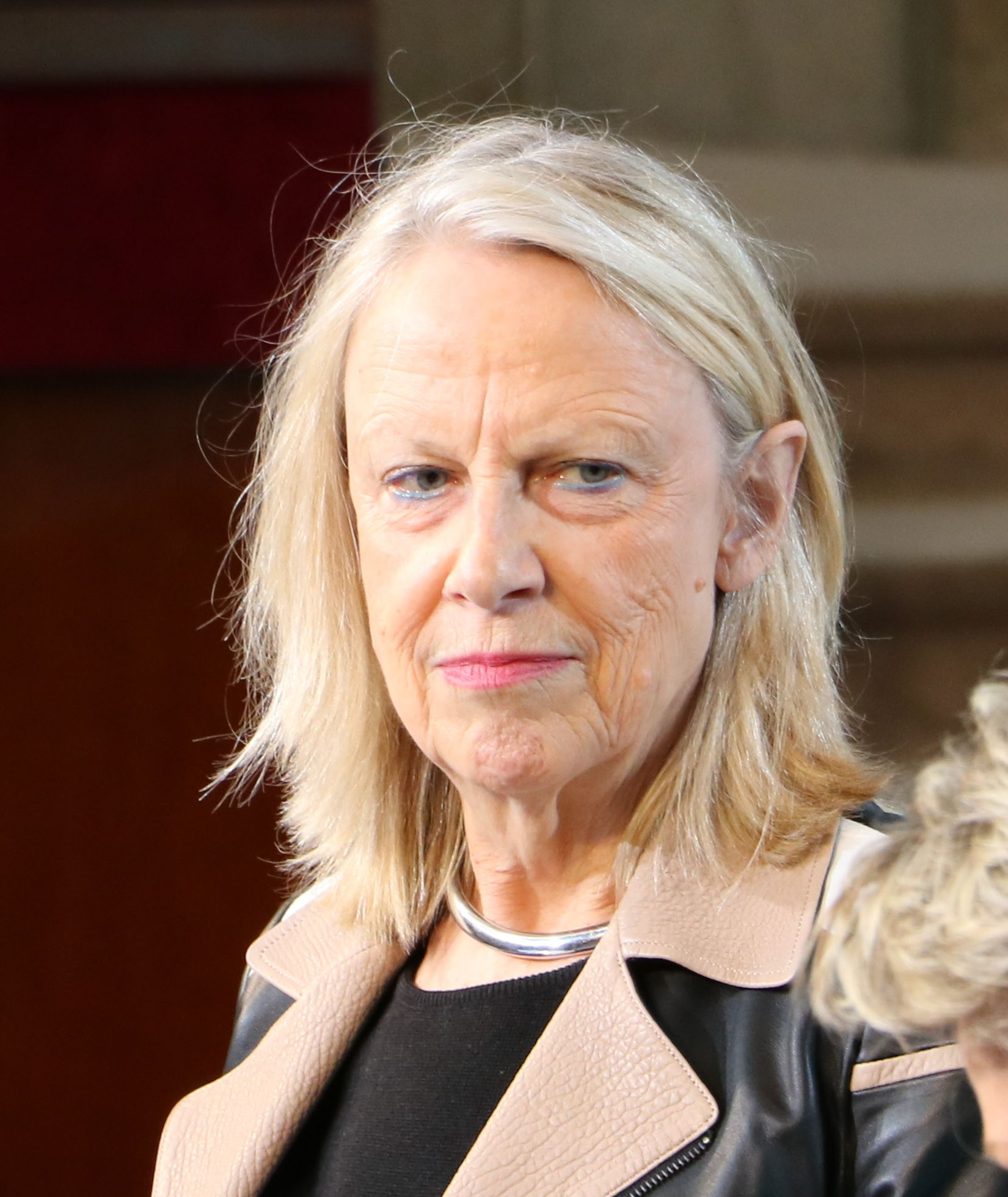
- Born: Brigitte Castillon; 14 December 1947 (age 78); Nantes, France
- Occupation: Minister
- Known for: Gender equity activism

Brigitte Grésy, born in Nantes, France on 14 December 1947, is a senior French civil servant, general inspector of social affairs since 2006. She is a specialist on issues of equality between men and women and the author of the report on professional equality submitted in July 2009 to the Minister of Labor. She was appointed Secretary General of the High Council for Professional Equality by order of the Minister for Women's Rights, Najat-Vallaud-Belkacem, on May 6, 2013. She is also a member of the High Council for Equality between Women and Men and has been its president since 24 June 2019.

== Biography ==
Brigitte Grésy was born Brigitte Castillon on 14 December 1947 in Nantes. She was the youngest in a family of three children. Her father was a director of tax services and her mother a French teacher. At age 21. after training in literary preparatory classes and French aggregation, she began her career as a teacher of classics in a high school in northern France and then at the Lycée Mansart, in Saint-Cyr-l'École. She married at 26 and then had two children. She entered through the internal competition at the National School of Administration (1987-1989).

She began her new career at the Ministry of Industry, in charge of the international mission, then became Chief of Staff to the Director General of Industrial Strategies.

After six years, she obtained a transfer to the General Inspectorate of Social Affairs.

From 1998-2004, she was head of the women's rights and equality department.

In 2004, she became Chief of Staff to the Minister for Parity and Professional Equality, Nicole Ameline, a position she held until 2005.

Appointed Inspector General of Social Affairs in 2006, she produced numerous reports on equality, such as the report on professional equality in 2009 or that on lifelong parenthood in 2011.

Grésy was appointed Secretary General of the Higher Council for Professional Equality in 2013, a consultative body chaired by Marisol Touraine, Minister of Social Affairs, Health and Women's Rights, who is assisted by Pascale Boistard, Secretary of State in charge of women's rights.

She is also a member of the High Council for equality between women and men, within the commission on the fight against sexist stereotypes and the distribution of social roles. Since June 24, 2019, she has chaired this Board, succeeding Danielle Bousquet.

At her swearing in as president of the High Council for Equality, Grésy said,

“I express the wish that women will no longer be murdered, sexually exploited, harassed or underpaid because they are women, so that they have the right to circulate without danger, to access full autonomy.”

== Selected works ==
- Brigitte Grésy, "The image of women in advertising: report to the secretary of state for women's rights and professional training", Documentation française, 2002.
- Brigitte Grésy, “But who will look after the children?, The World, 7 March 2011.
- Brigitte Grésy and Sylviane Giampino, "Two women interview men, managers and executives", Corporate Social Responsibility Observatory, May 2012
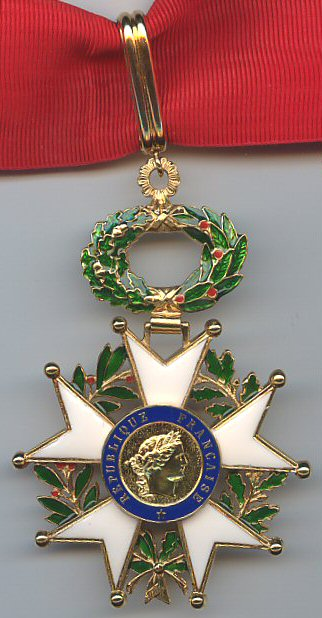
- Commander of the order of the Legion of Honor.
  Brigitte Grésy, "Sexism in the world of work - between denial and reality", Higher Council for Professional Equality between Women and Men, March 2017.

== Awards ==
- Commander of the Legion of Honor
- Knight of the National Order of Merit (1994)
