= Donatian =

Donatian may refer to:

- Donatian of Carthage (died 259), one of the Martyrs of Carthage under Valerian
- Donatian and Rogatian of Nantes
  - Basilica of St. Donatian and St. Rogatian, Nantes
- Donatian of Reims (died 389), 4th-century French saint, the 8th Bishop of Reims

== See also ==
- Donatien, a given name
- Donation (disambiguation)
- Naessens, a Dutch form of Donatian
