= Pavillon de Marsan =

Pavilion in the Palais du Louvre

Coordinates: 48.8634°N 2.3324°E

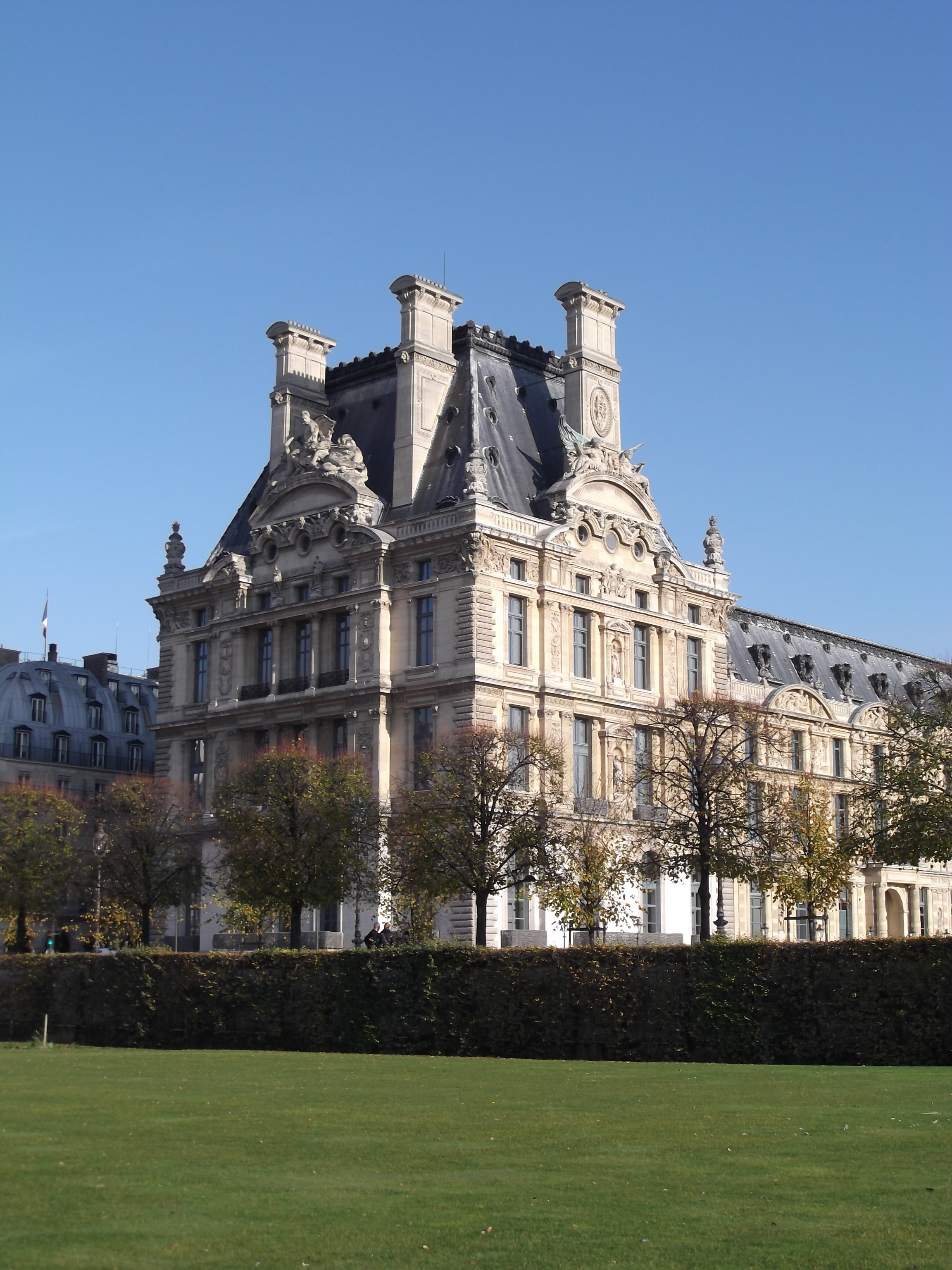
The Pavillon de Marsan viewed from the Tuileries Garden

The Pavillon de Marsan (French pronunciation: [pavijɔ̃ d(ə) maʁsɑ̃]) or Marsan Pavilion was built in the 1660s as the northern end of the Tuileries Palace in Paris, and reconstructed in the 1870s after the Tuileries burned down at the end of the Paris Commune. Following the completion of the joining of the Louvre and the Tuileries in the 1850s and the demolition of the Tuileries' remains in the early 1880s, it is now the northwestern tip of the Louvre Palace. Since 1897 it has been part of the Musée des Arts Décoratifs, a separate institution from the Louvre.

== History ==
The pavilion was originally built in 1666, based on a design by Louis Le Vau. The exterior was similar to that of its southern pendant, the Pavillon de Flore. On its south side, the Pavillon de Marsan was connected to Le Vau's pavilion for the stage of the Théâtre des Tuileries, completed in 1661. On the Pavillon de Marsan's east side, Le Vau constructed the first bay of the North Wing, heading toward the Louvre. The south façade of the North Wing replicated the courtyard façade of its southern pendant, the Grande Galerie; it remained a one-bay stub until the wing was extended by Percier and Fontaine in 1807–1812. For each of these façades Le Vau employed the giant order, which had first been used over sixty years earlier by Henry IV's architect(s) for the Pavillon de Flore, the Petite Galerie of the Tuileries and the western section of the Grande Galerie.

The Pavillon de Marsan as designed by Louis Le Vau

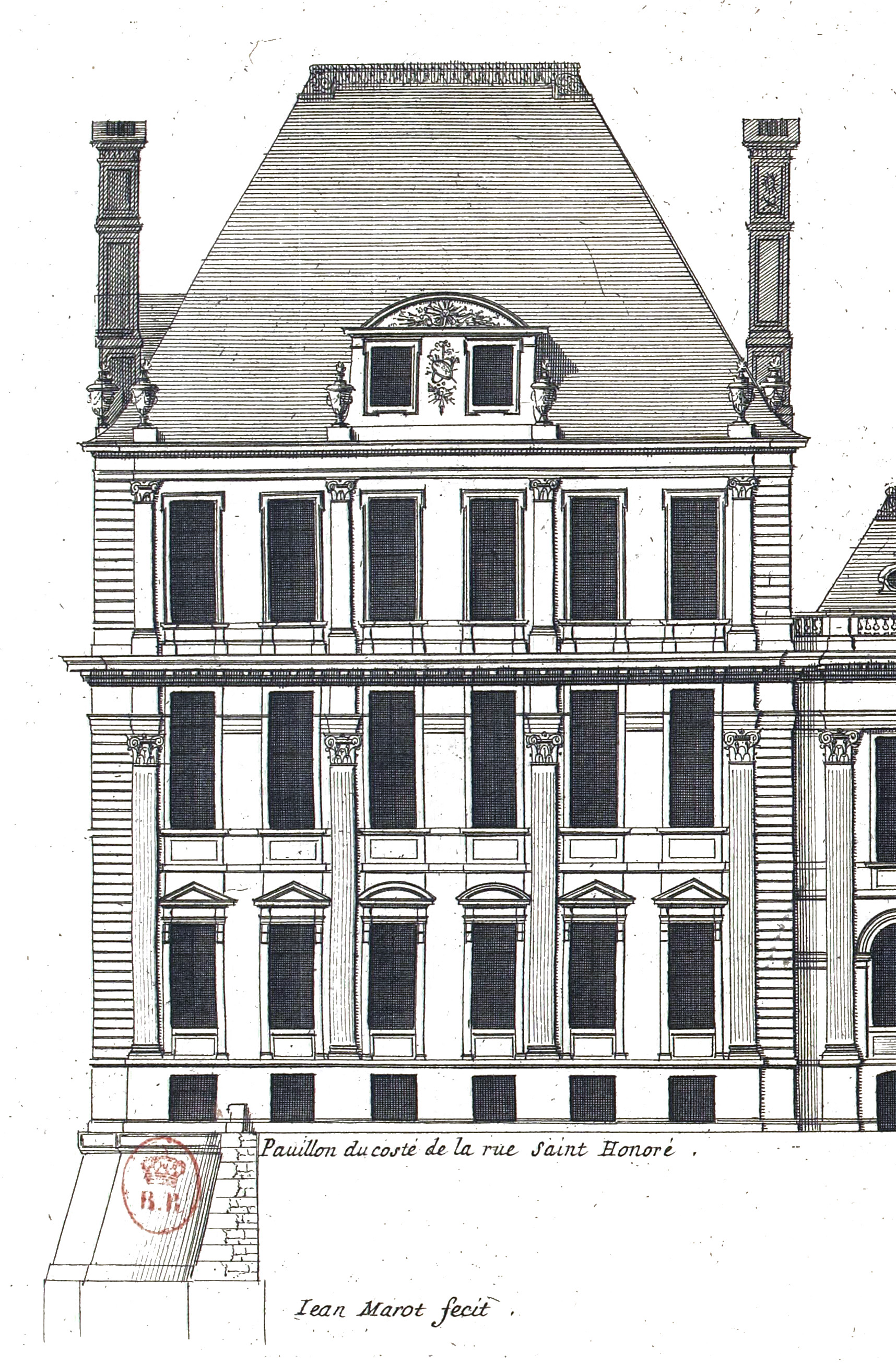
West façade facing the garden, detail from a c.1670 engraving by Jean Marot

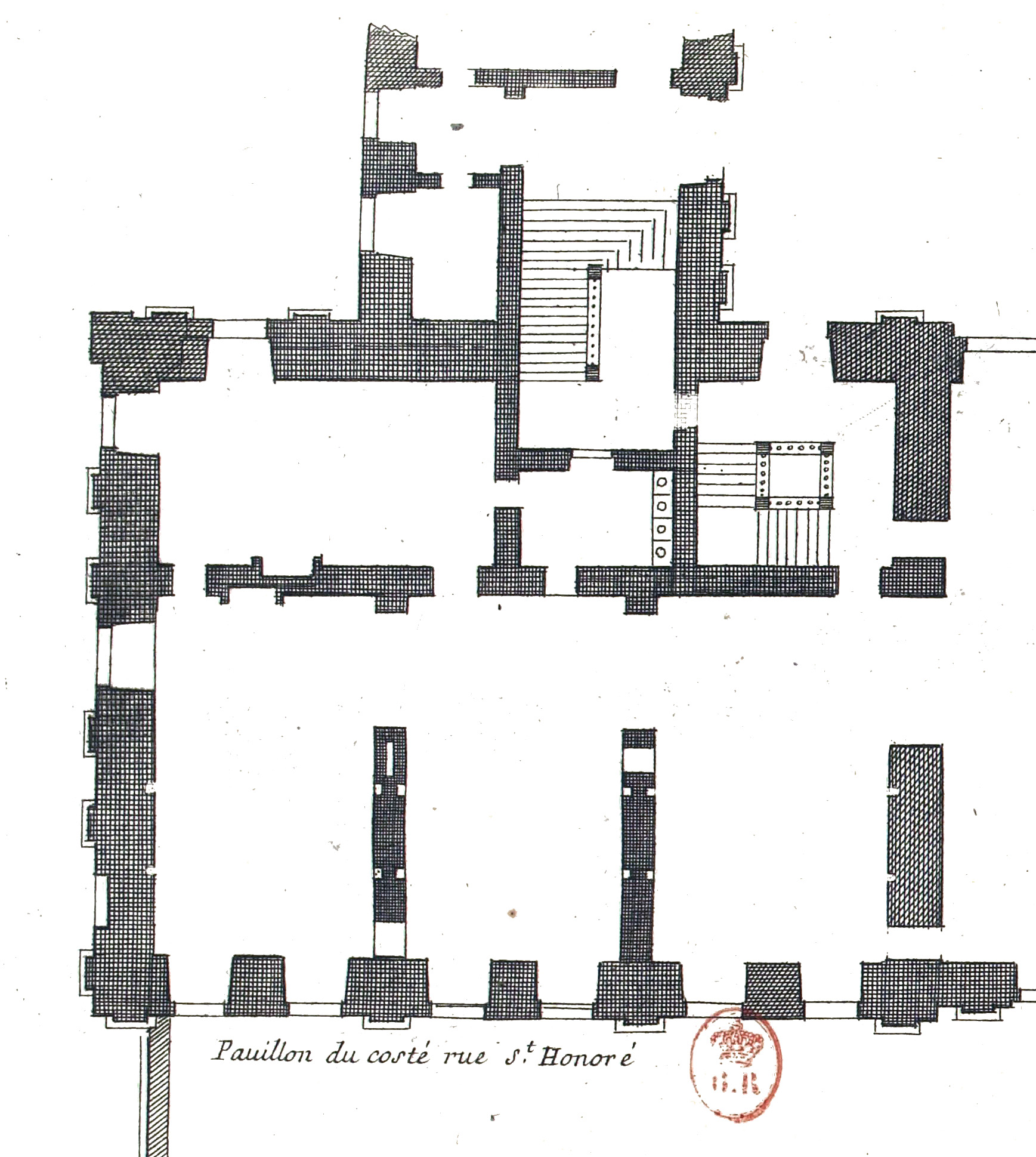
Ground-floor plan showing the pavilion and the first bay of the North Wing (at top), which contains the grand staircase, detail from an engraving by Jean Marot

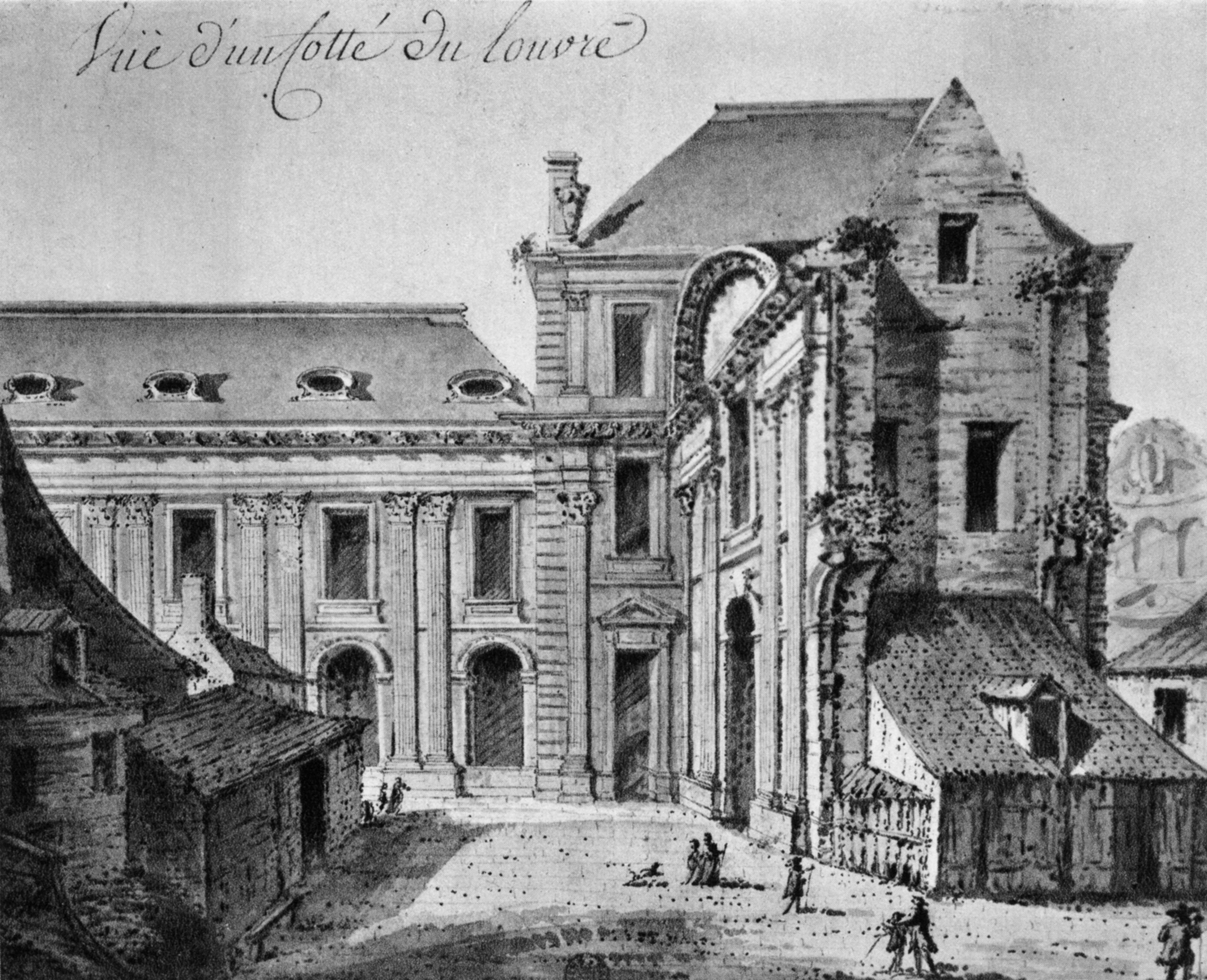
View of the east side with the first bay of the North Wing, 18th-century watercolor by Hugues Taraval

In the third quarter of the 18th century the Pavillon de Marsan included the apartment of Marie Louise de Rohan, governess of the king's grandchildren and known as Madame de Marsan from her past marriage with Gaston, Count of Marsan. The pavilion, which until then had been referred to simply as the north pavilion or the pavilion near the rue Saint-Honoré, took its current name from her. At the time when the royal family inhabited the Tuileries during the French Revolution, Madame Adélaïde had her apartment on the pavilion's ground floor.

In the 1800s, Percier and Fontaine extended the North Wing to the east in order to complete the Louvre Palace but only went as far as the Pavillon de Rohan. The complete merger of the Tuileries and the Louvre would only be accomplished a half-century later with Napoleon III's Louvre expansion.

In 1820 Henri, Count of Chambord was born here.

In 1871 the Pavillon de Marsan burned down together with the Tuileries Palace. Its ruins were entirely demolished and the pavilion reconstructed by Hector-Martin Lefuel from 1874 to 1879. Lefuel, who disliked the giant order as a matter of principle and found it unsuitable for the Louvre, went on to reconstruct the North Wing on a slightly broadened footprint, but works to that end stopped around the time of his death in 1880. As a consequence, the North Wing is now divided into Lefuel's Aile de Marsan (Marsan Wing) to the west and Percier and Fontaine's Aile de Rohan (Rohan Wing) to the east.

The Pavillon de Marsan after the 1871 fire

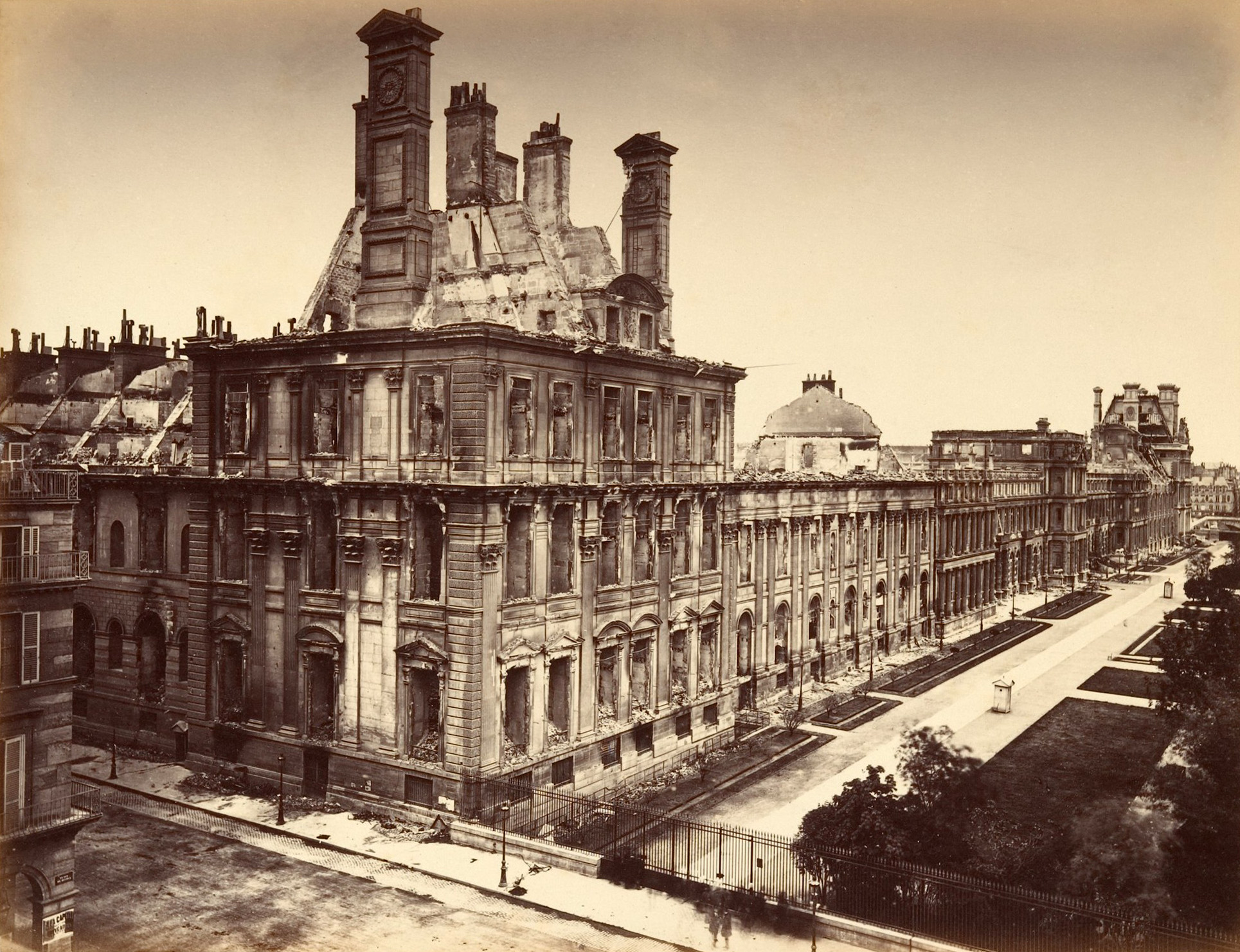
Ruins after the fire, 1871 photo by
Alphonse Liébert

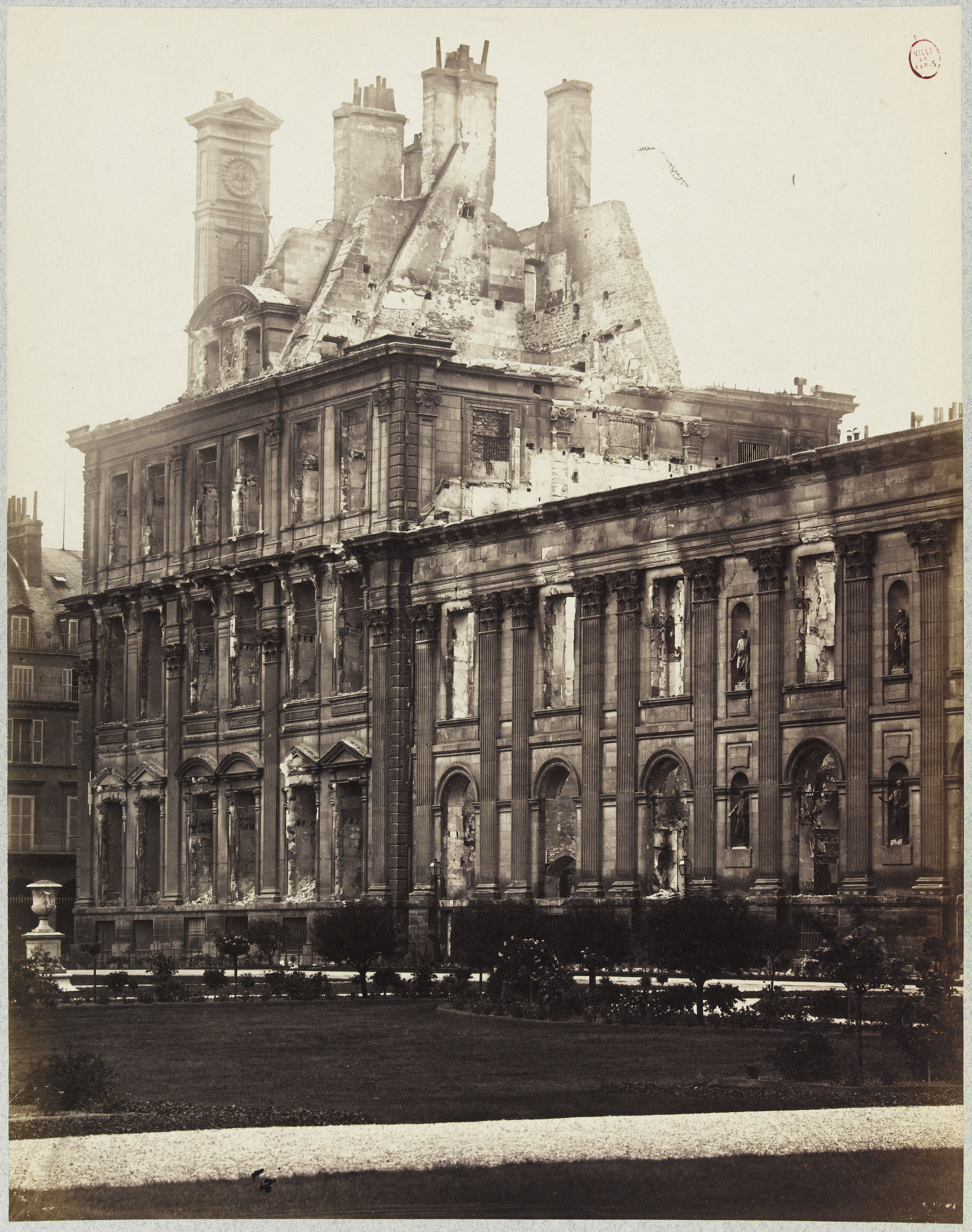
West façade viewed from the south

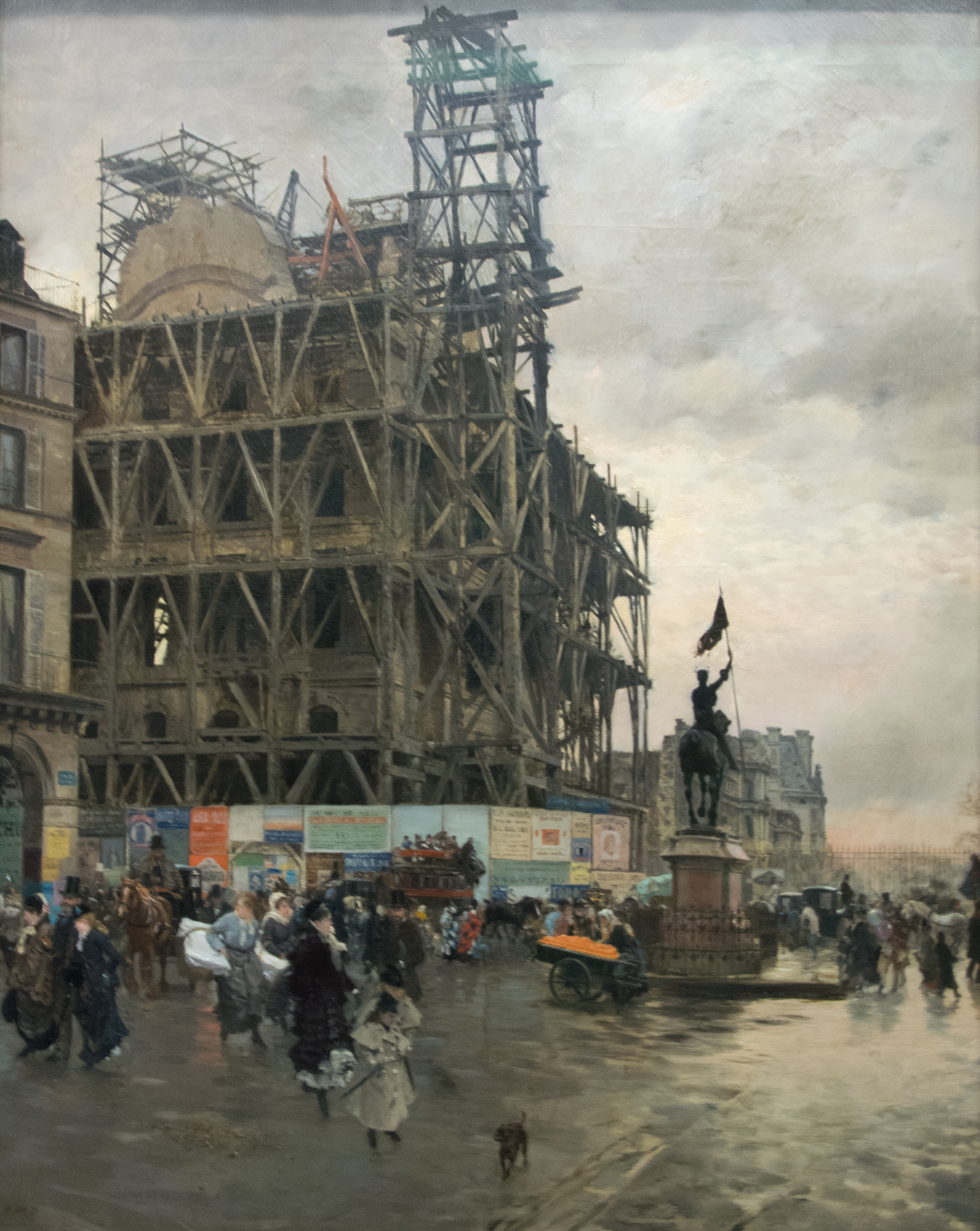
Reconstruction. La Place des Pyramides, Paris, an 1875 painting by Giuseppe De Nittis

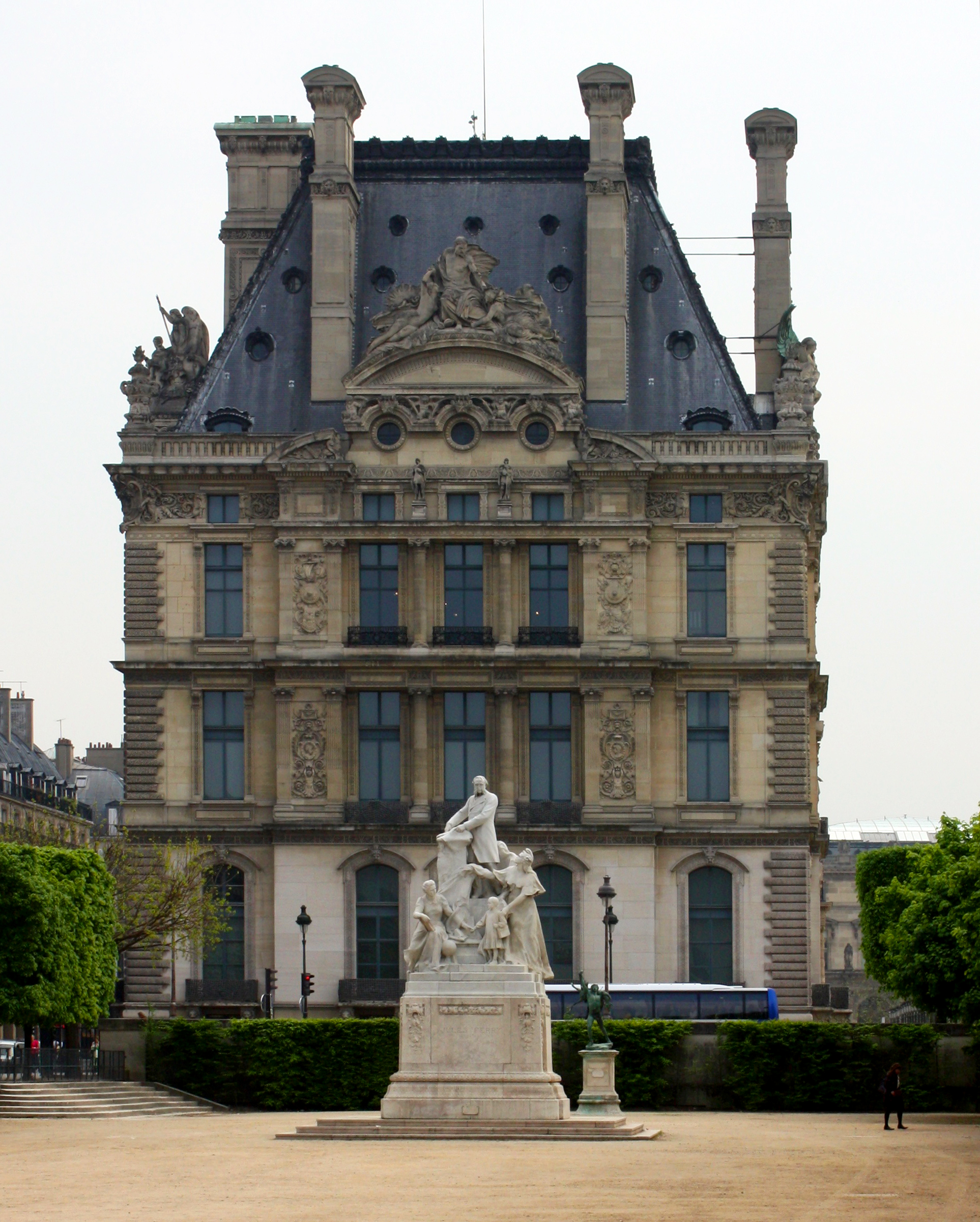
West façade in 2013

A project to locate the Cour des Comptes in the Pavillon de Marsan was stillborn, even though the building was used in the late 19th century to store archives of that institution. In 1897 the Pavillon and Aile de Marsan were eventually given over to the Union Centrale des Arts Décoratifs, which remodeled it from 1898 to 1905 under designs by Gaston Redon assisted by Paul Lorain. The Arts Décoratifs Library opened in 1904 and the Musée des Arts Décoratifs opened in May 1905.

== Decoration ==
The pavilion is adorned with abundant architectural sculpture, as with other parts of Lefuel's work at the Louvre. An unusual feature is the use of copper for the wings of an allegorical winged lion above the southern pediment facing the Carrousel Garden, created by Théodore-Charles Gruyère in 1878.

Exterior decorations on the Pavillon de Marsan

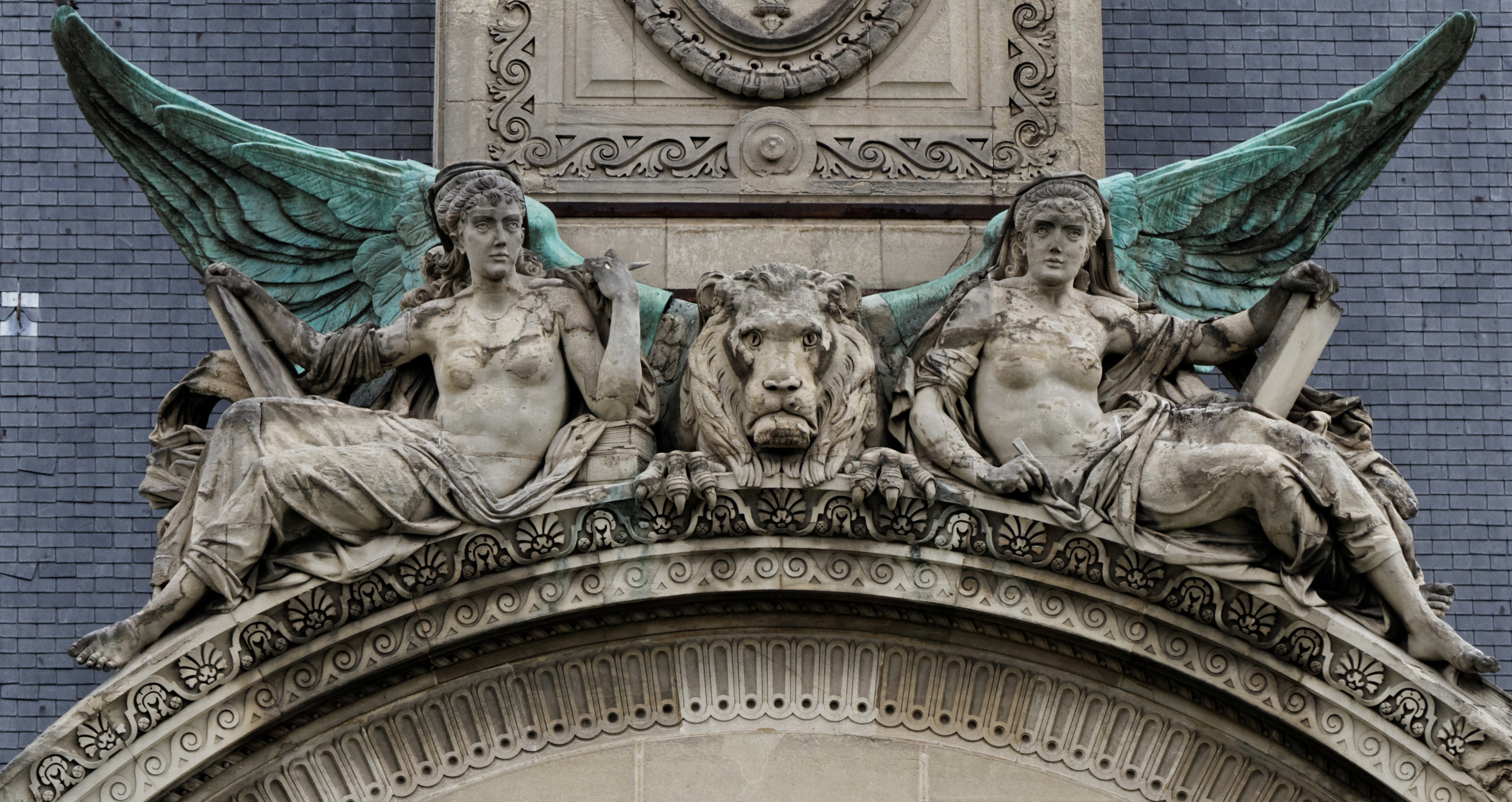
Sculpture of winged lion by Théodore-Charles Gruyère, on the south façade

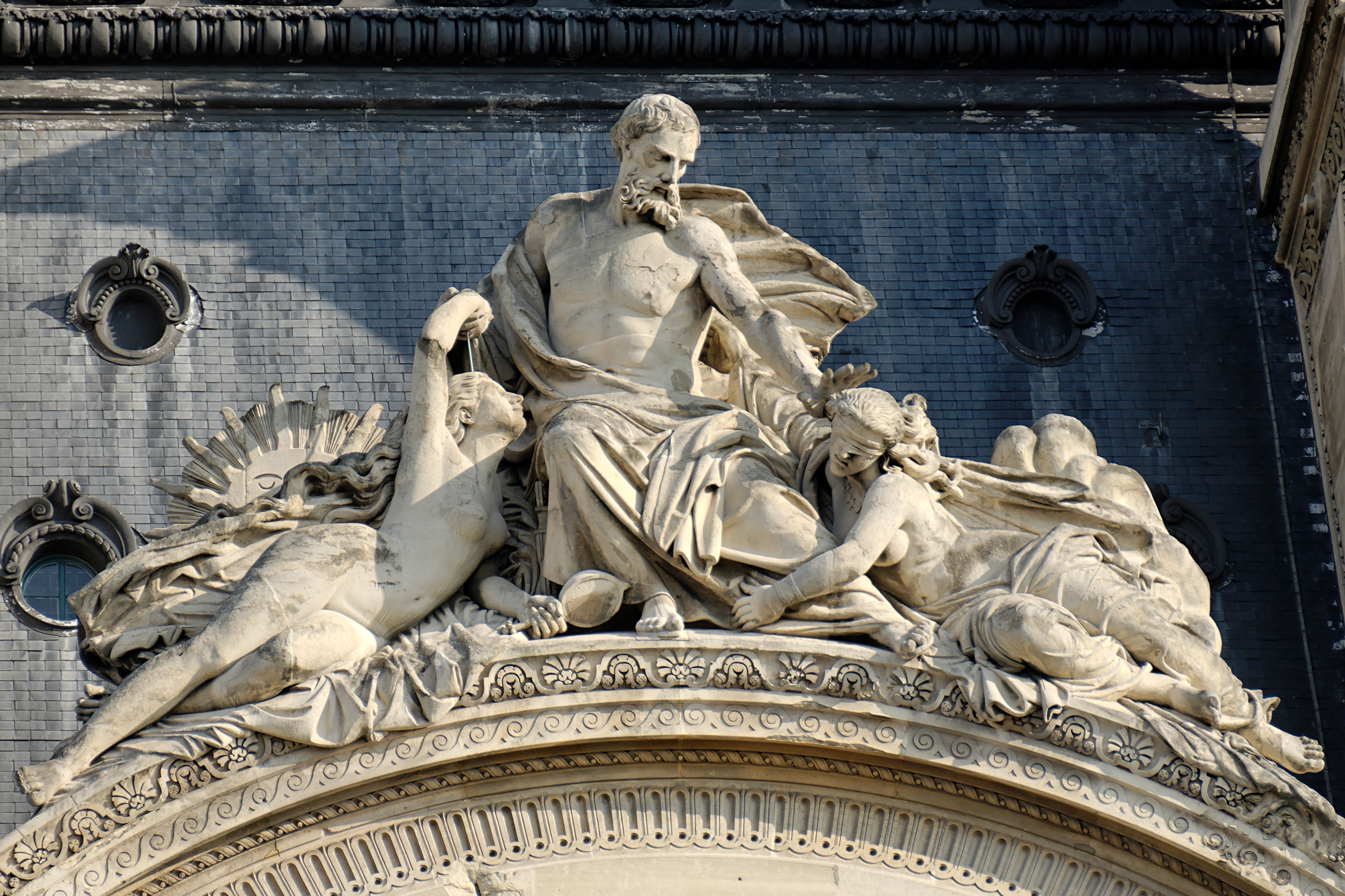
Sculpture by Jean-Marie Bonnassieux, on the Tuileries Garden façade: The wise man welcomes Truth and rejects Error (1878)

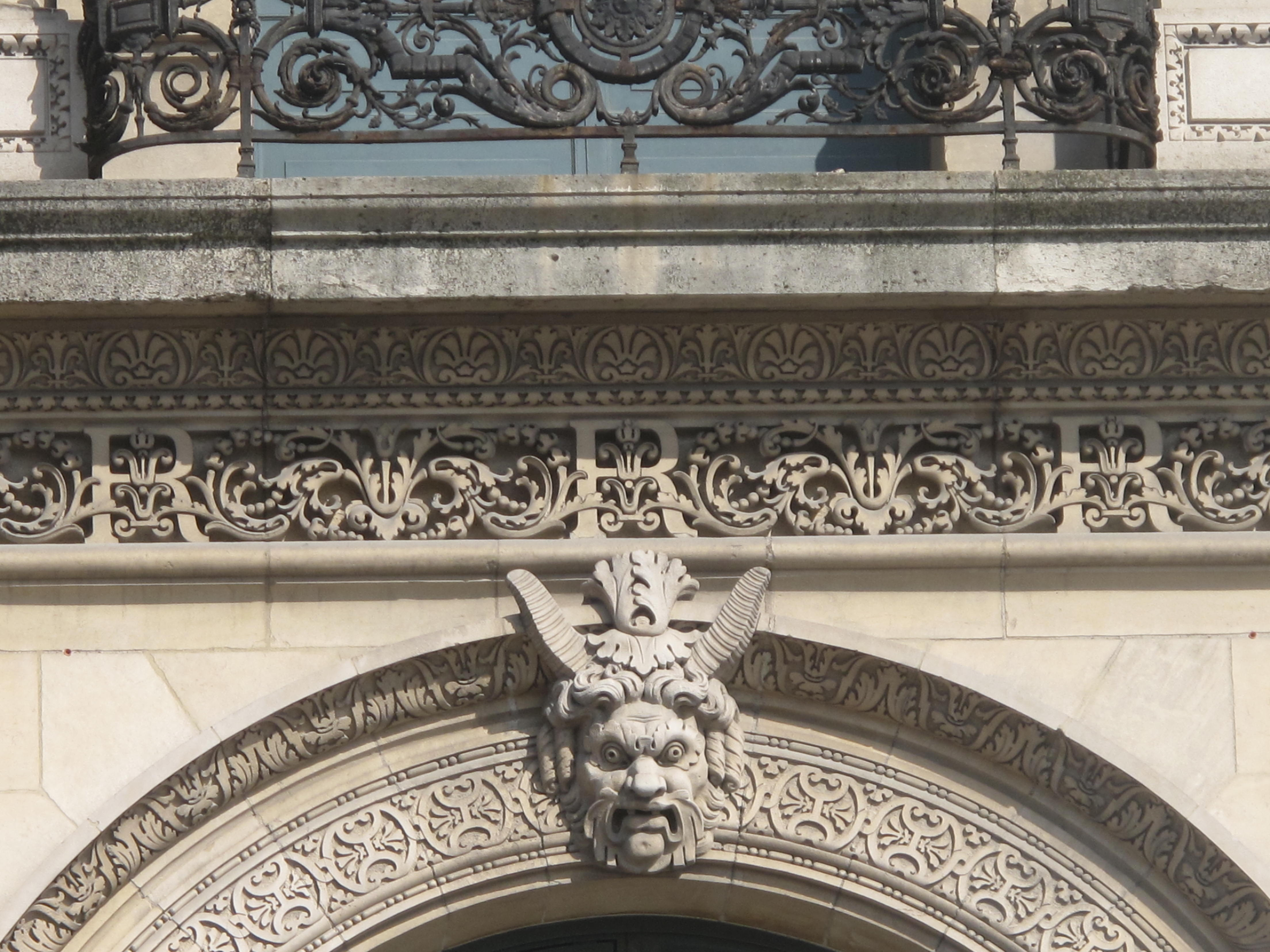
Frieze with letters "R" (for République) and window arch at the first floor

Further east, on the south façade of the Aile de Marsan, are a series of eight pediments with allegorical sculptures, namely Astronomy (by Gabriel Thomas); Accounting (above Science and Art, by Pierre-Jules Cavelier); Architecture (above Masonry and Ironwork, by Louis-Ernest Barrias); Plenty (above Wheat Harvest and Grape Harvest, by Mathurin Moreau); Legislation (above Charlemagne and Moses), by Hélène Bertaux; The Birth of Venus (above Sea and Wind, by Henri-Charles Maniglier); unidentified theme (above Mercury and Hercules, by Amédée Donatien Doublemard); and Peace (by Frédéric-Louis-Désiré Bogino).

Pediment sculptures on the south façade of the Aile de Marsan

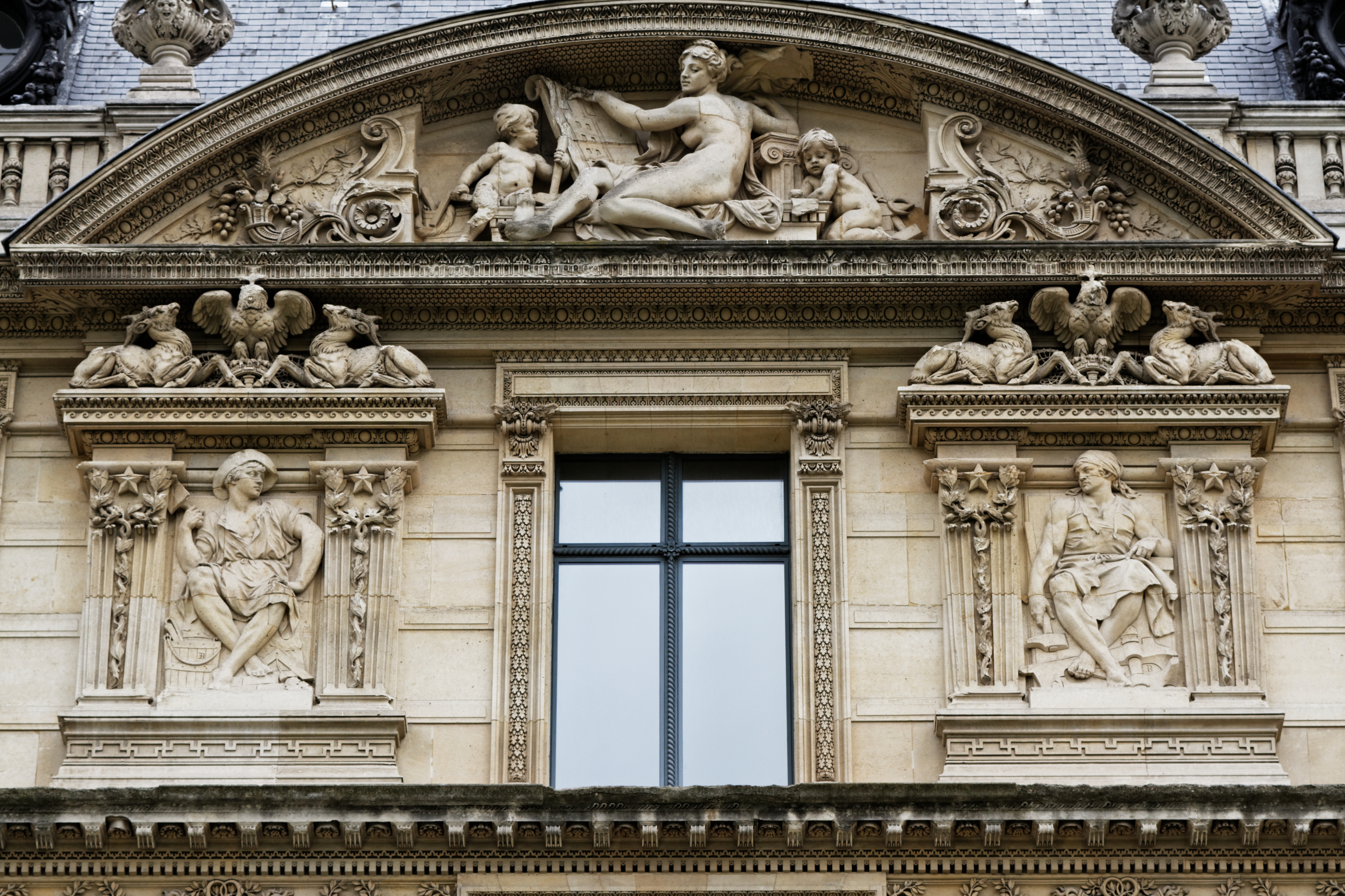
Architecture by Louis-Ernest Barrias

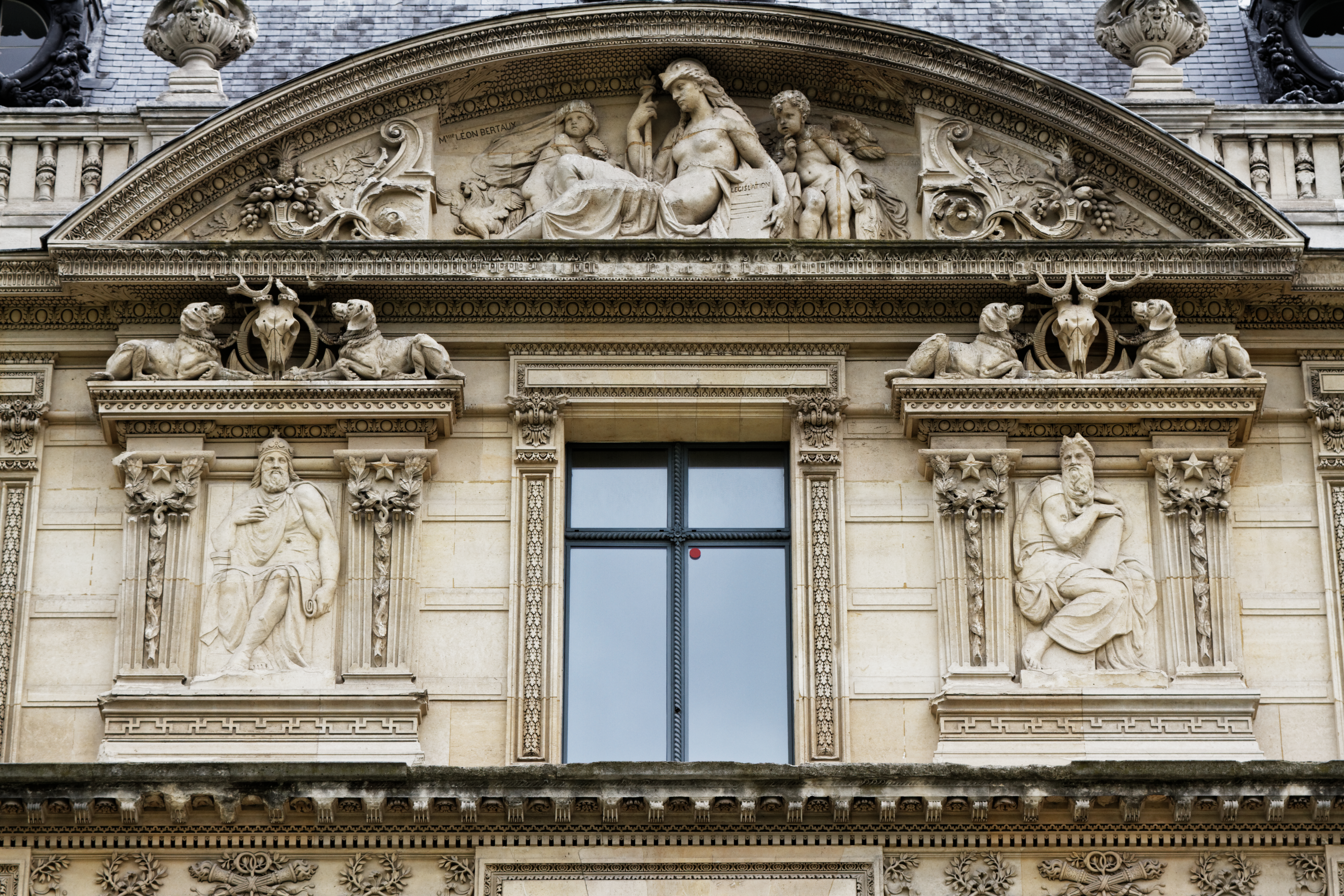
Legislation by Hélène Bertaux

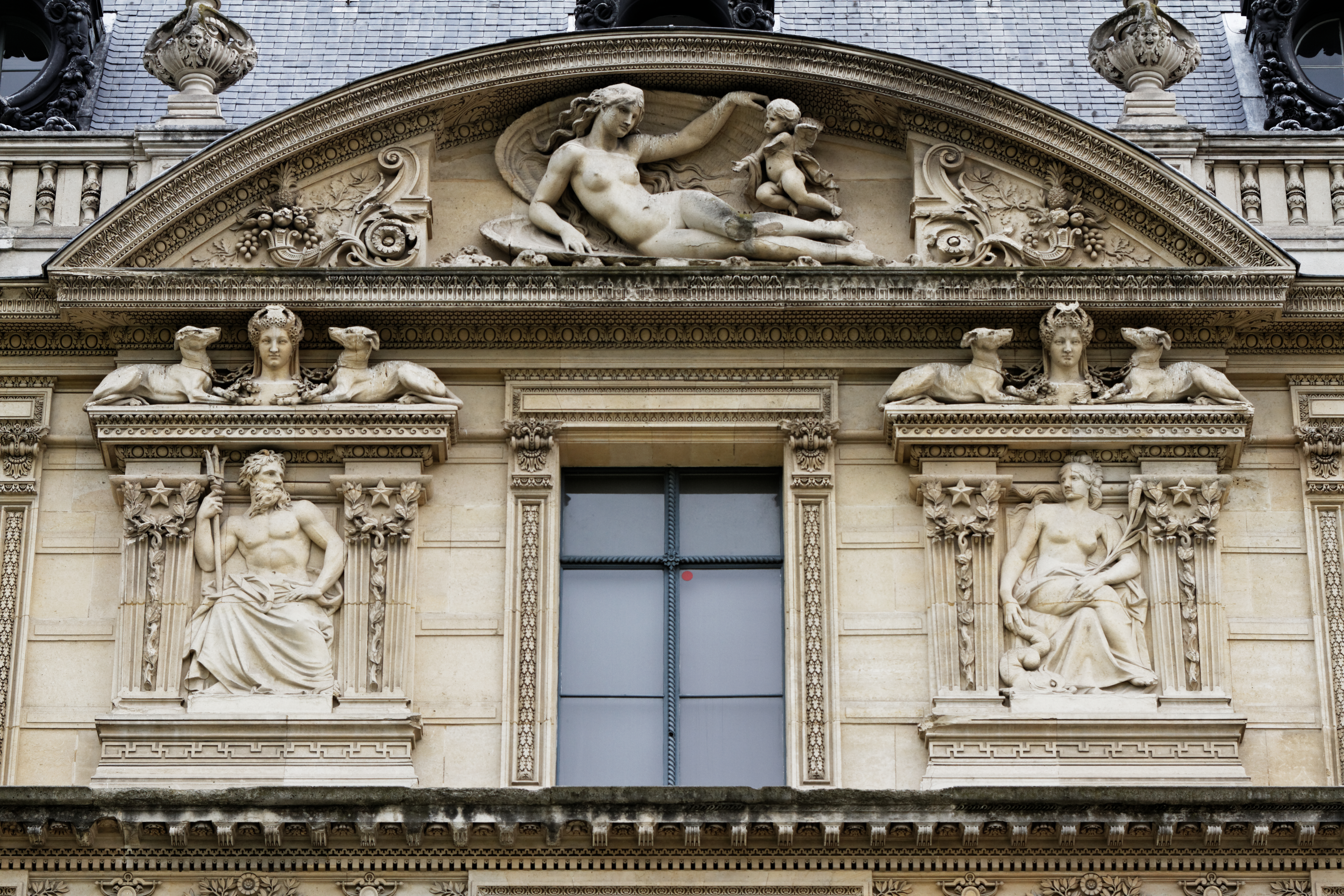
The Birth of Venus

== See also ==
- Pavillon de Flore
