= Donation (disambiguation) =

A donation is a gift given, typically to a cause or/and for charitable purposes.

Donation may also refer to:

== Gifts ==
- Donation (Catholic canon law), the gratuitous transfer in Catholic canon law to another of some right or thing
- Blood donation, when an individual voluntarily has blood drawn to be given to a recipient
- Organ donation, the removal of the tissues of the human body for the purpose of transplanting
- Gamete donation (disambiguation), the donation of gametes, either ova or sperm
- Body donation, the donation of the whole body after death for medical research and education

== Places ==
- Donation, Pennsylvania, a community in the United States
- Donation Tract, a land tract in southern Ohio

== Legal ==
- Donation Land Claim Act (1850), intended to promote homestead settlements in the Oregon Territory
- Donation of Pepin (756), provided a legal basis for the erection of the Papal States
- Donation of Constantine, a forged Roman imperial edict devised probably between 750 and 775
- Donation of Sutri (728), an agreement reached at Sutri by Liutprand, King of the Lombards and Pope Gregory II
- Bulls of Donation, three papal bulls of Pope Alexander VI

== See also ==
- Donatian (disambiguation)
- Donatien, a given name
