= Church of St Similien =

Église Saint-Similien
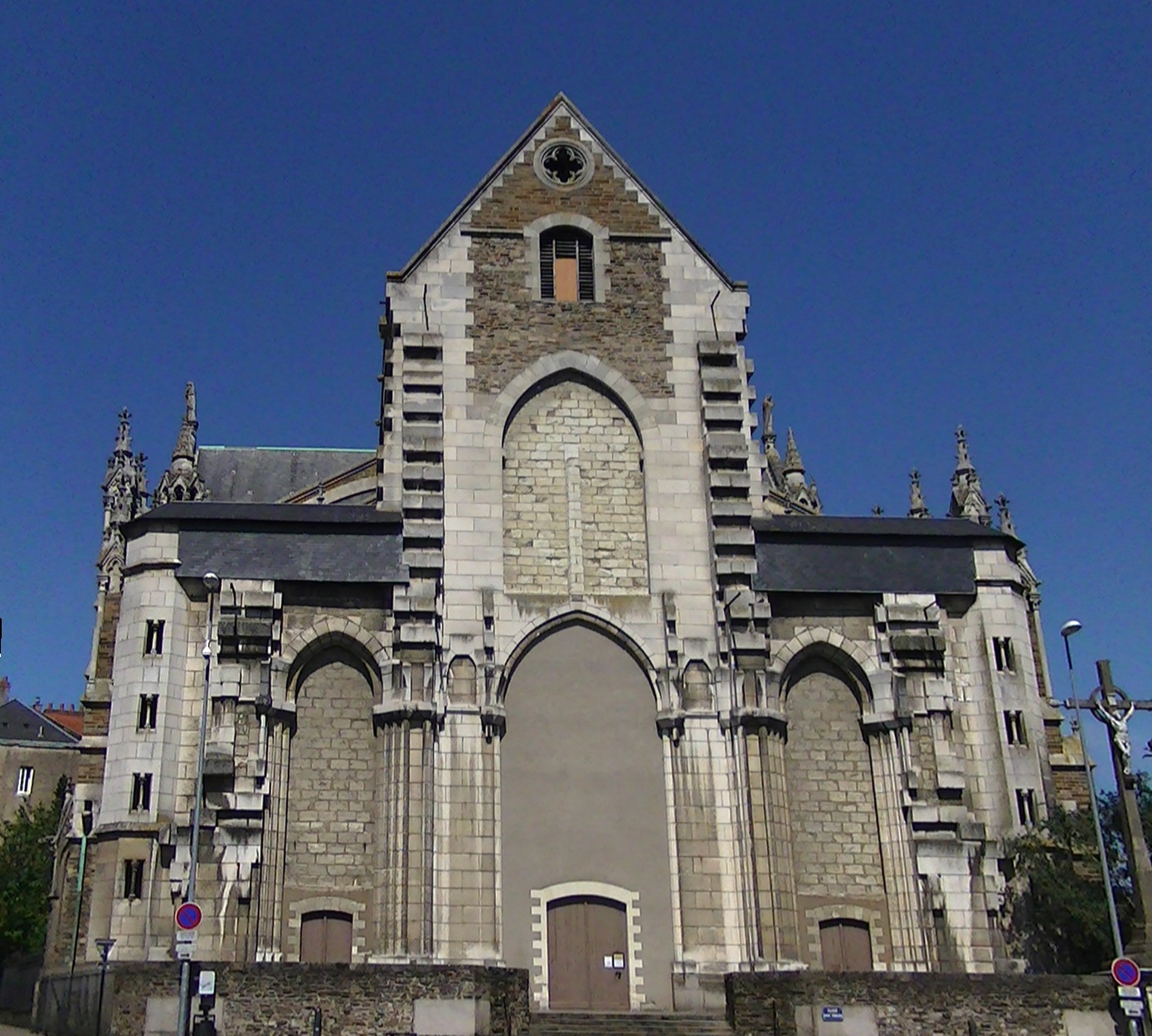
- Église Saint-Similien
- 47°13′13.33″N 1°33′34″E
- Location: Nantes
- Country: France
- Denomination: Roman Catholic
- Website: https://paroisse-saintseveques-nantes.fr/ (in French)

The Church of St. Similien, Nantes is an ancient church, in the Hauts-Pavés district of Nantes, France.

It is dedicated to Similien of Nantes and is located on the northwest side of the Place Saint-Similien.

== Gallery ==
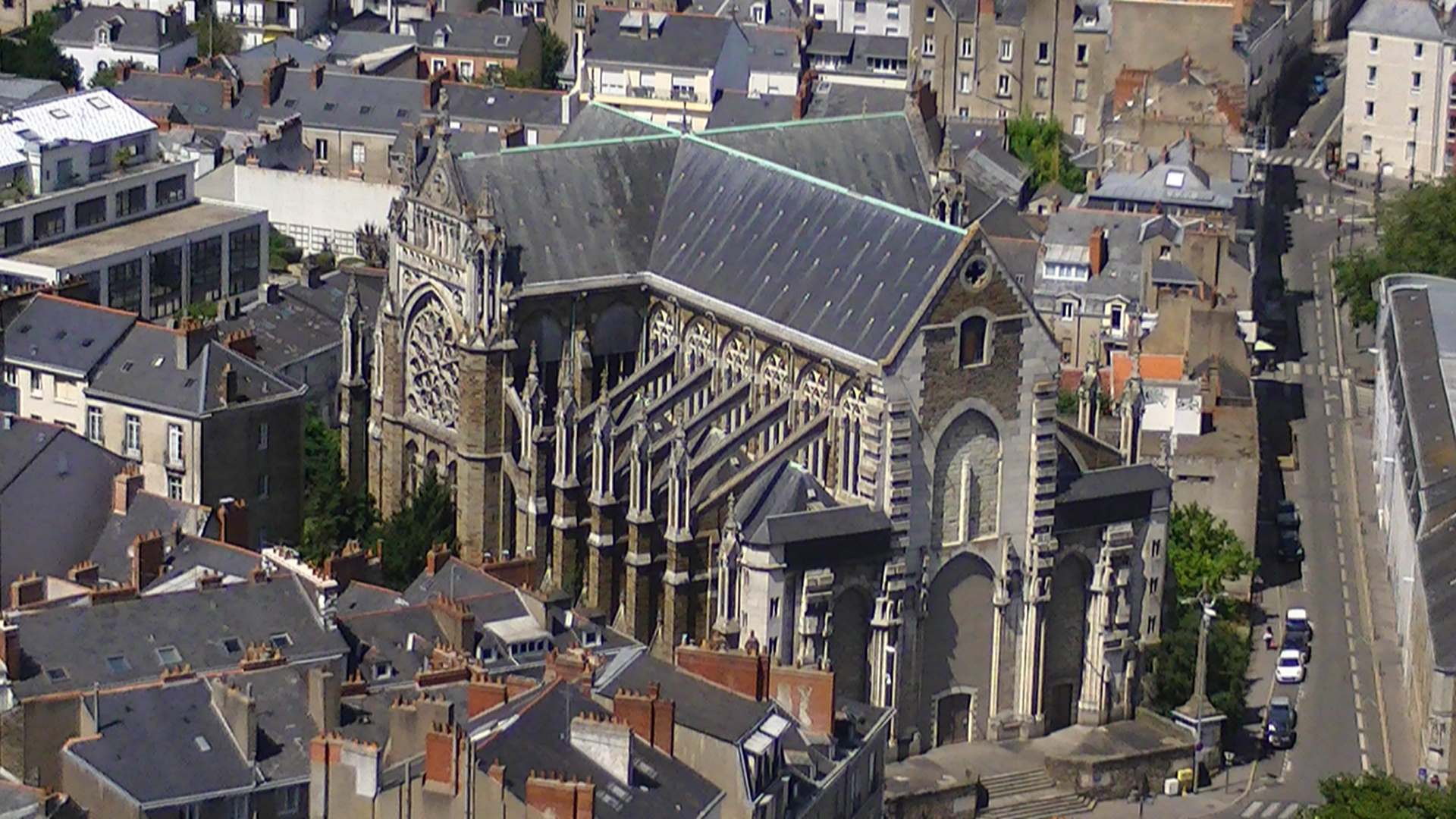

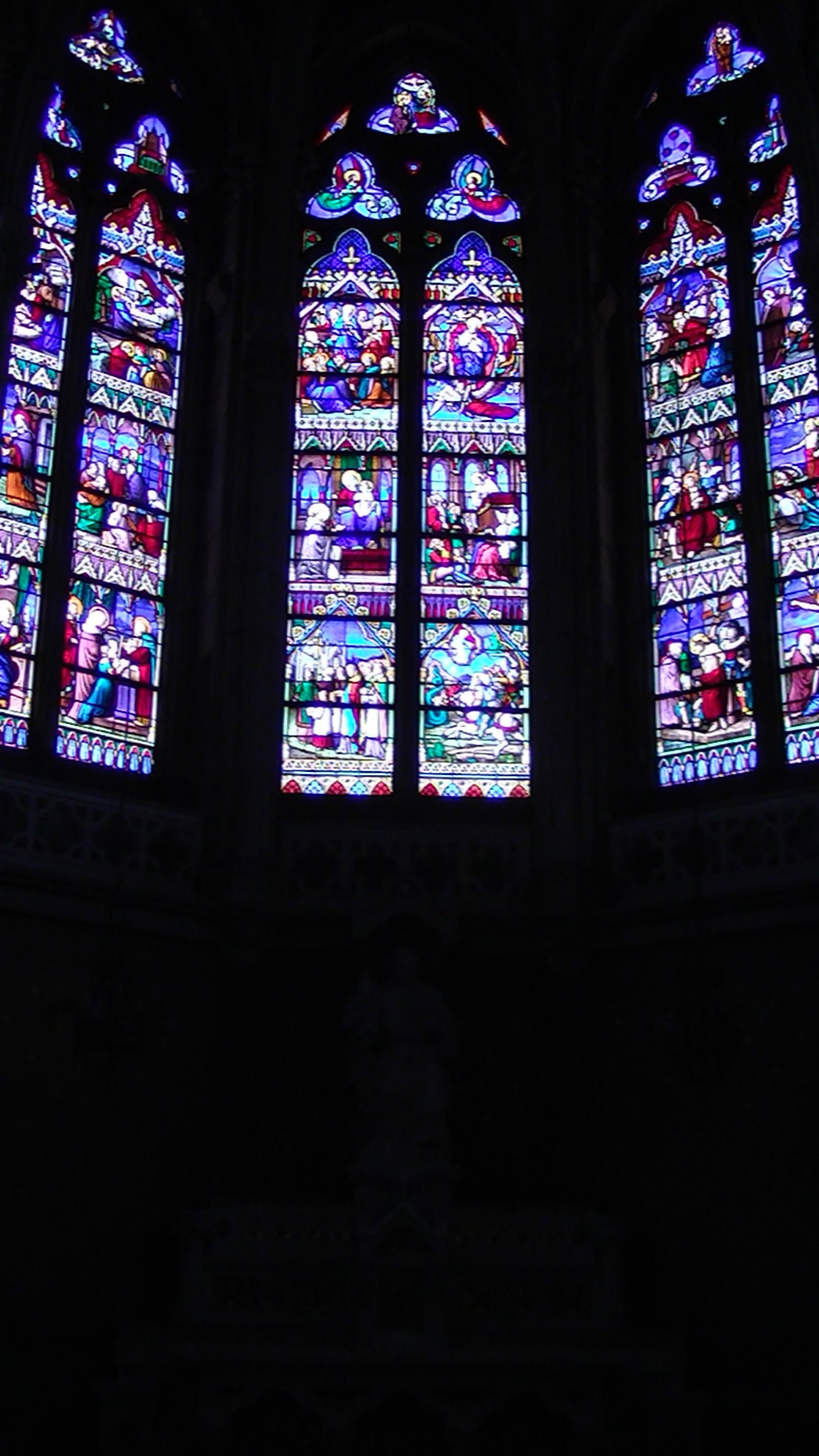

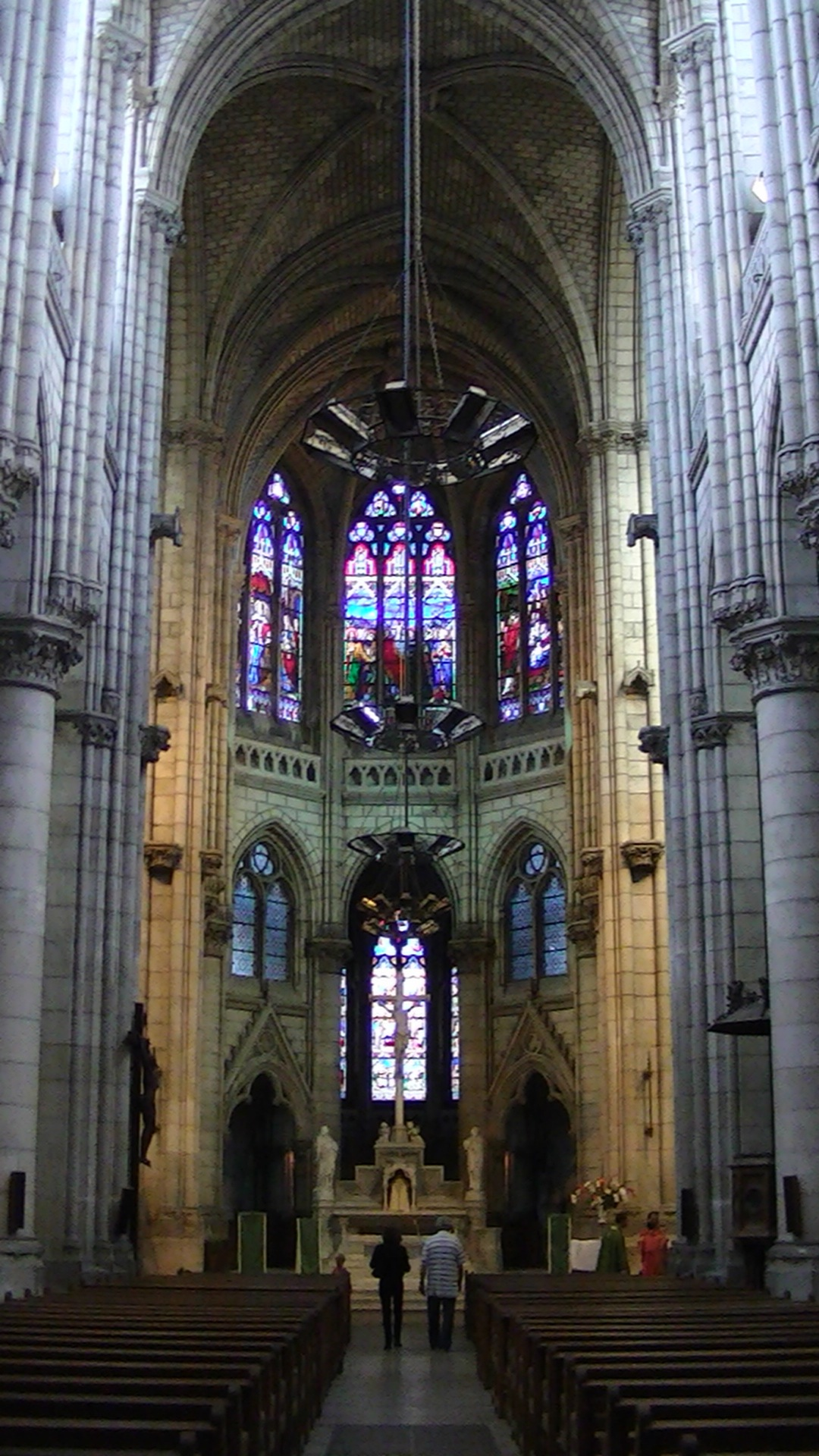

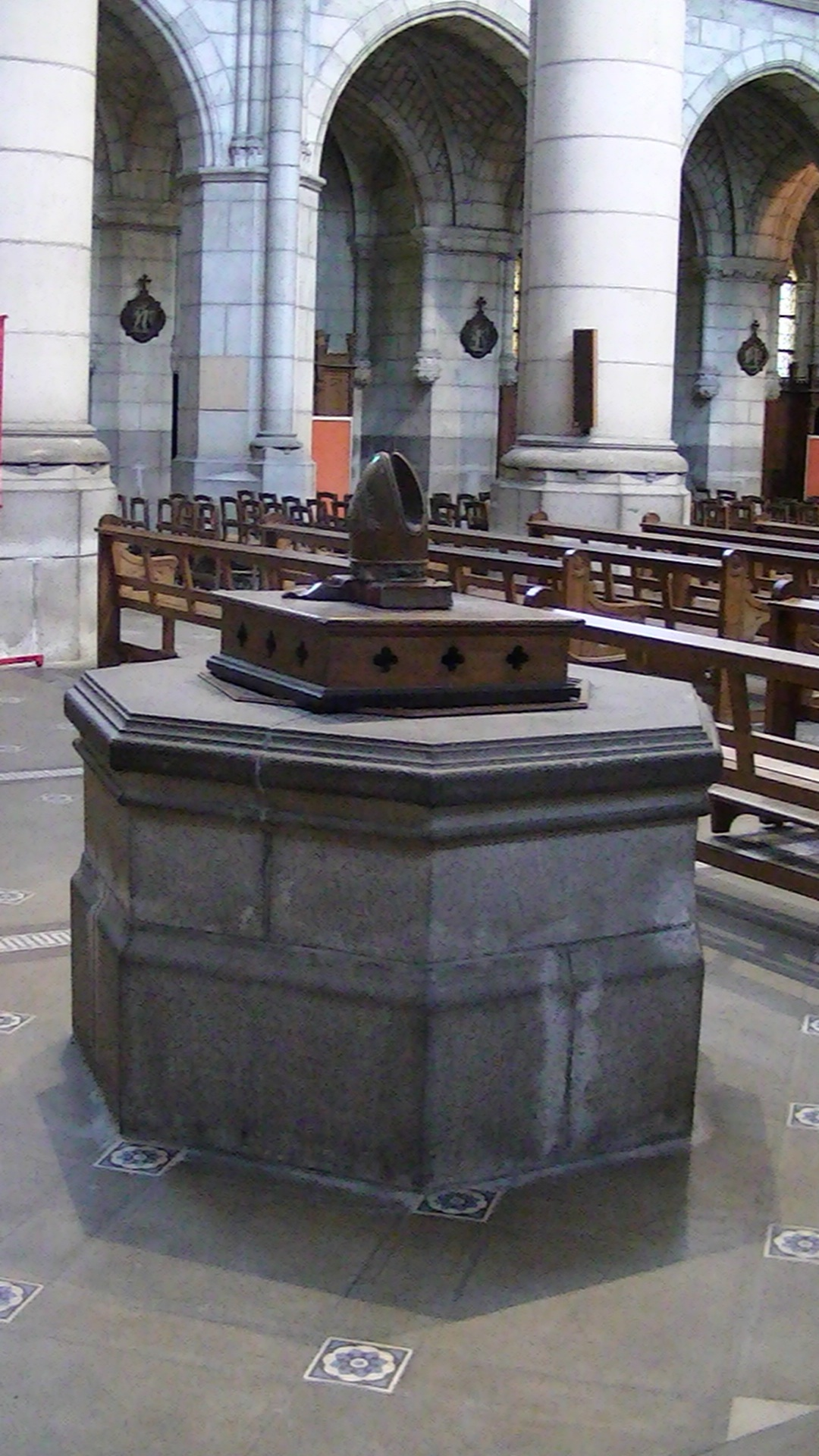

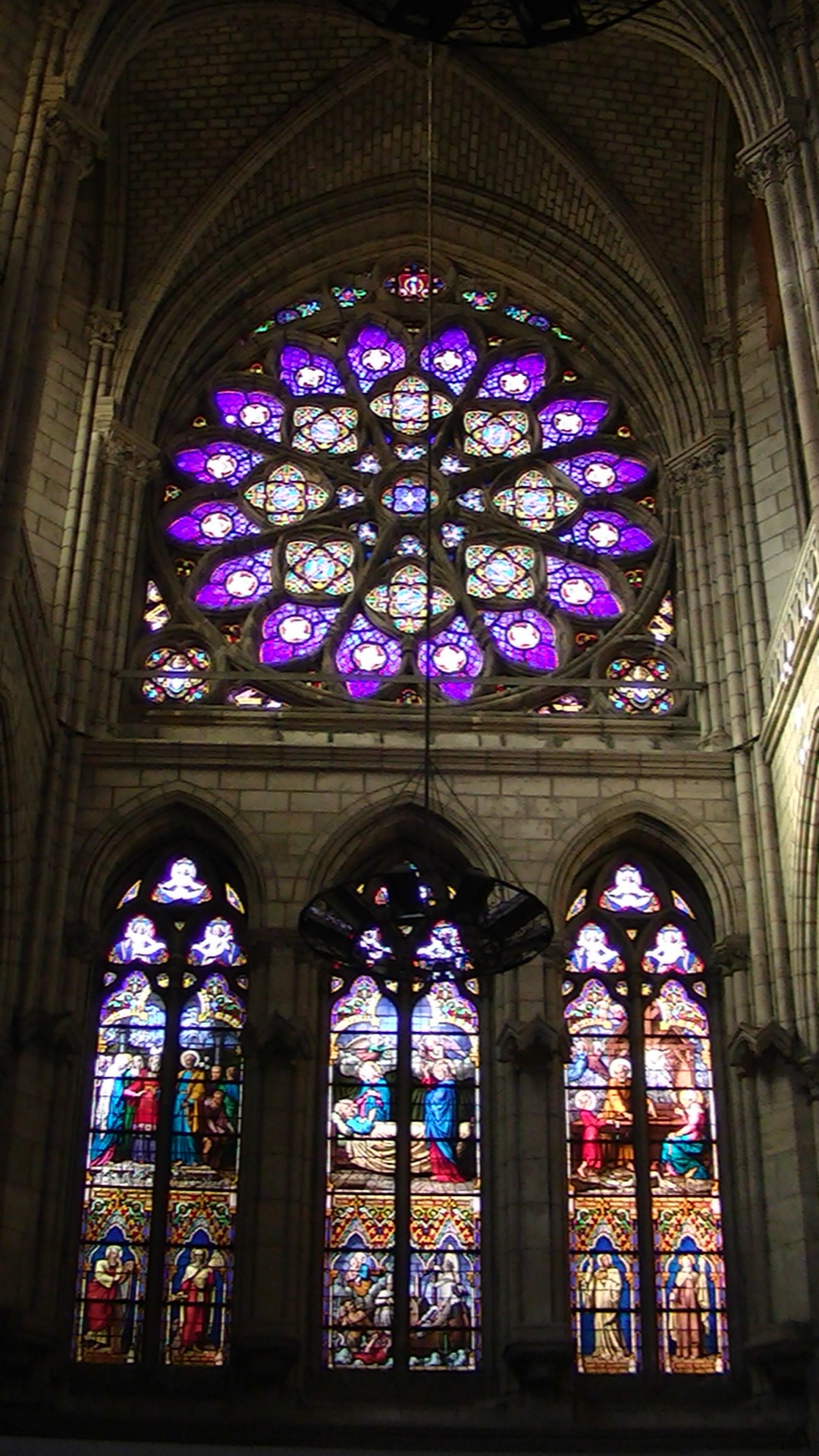

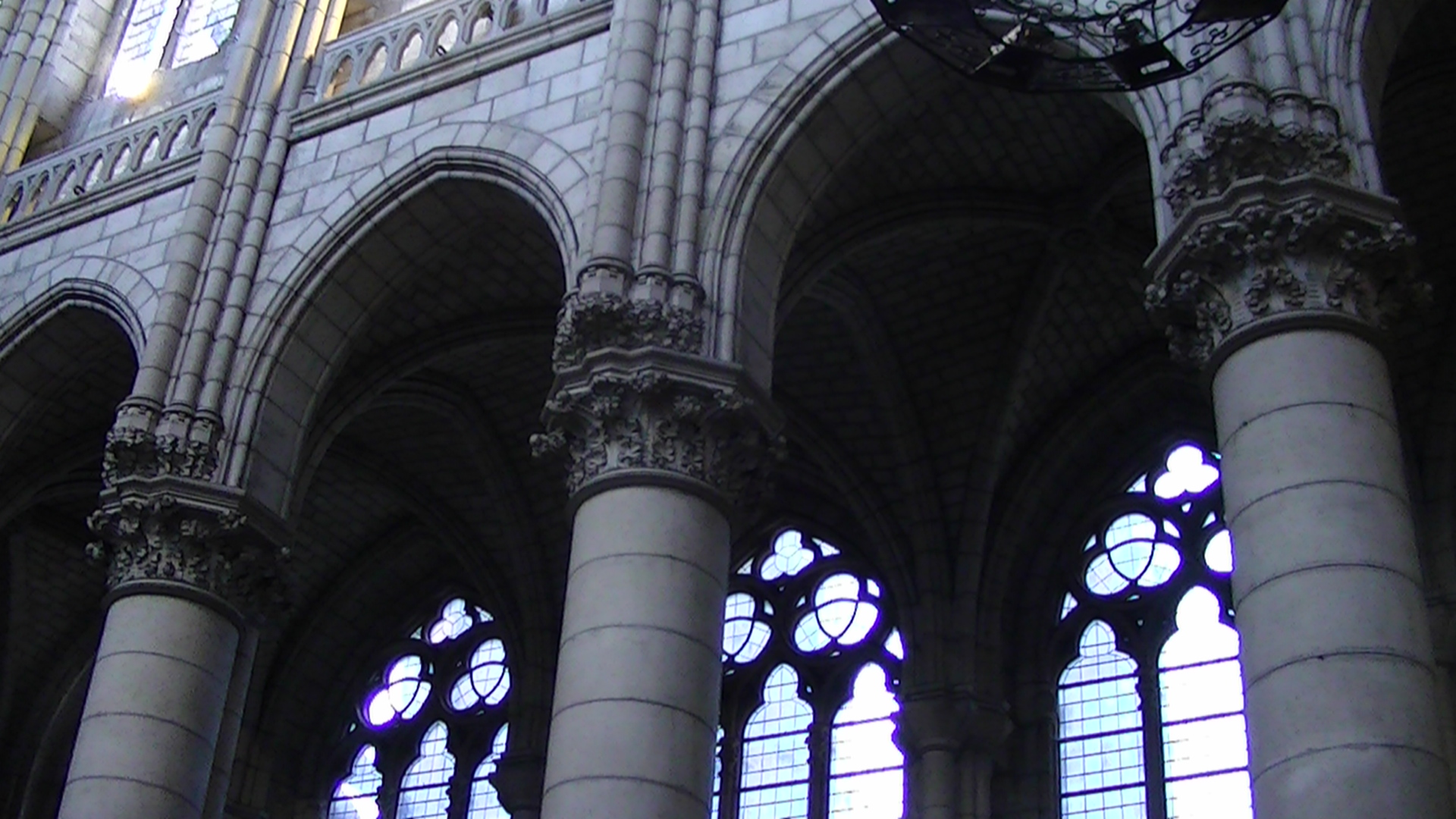

== History ==
After the death of Similien of Nantes in 310, his successor, Eumilius, erected a votive chapel over his grave.

A hundred years later, the bishop Leon, a Greek (444-458) built the first church on this site called "Saint-Sambin". The building, which was 20 meters long and 9 meters wide, terminated at the east with an exedra, an apse with a diameter of 4 metres. Built in square stones interspersed with brick chaining, it was dedicated on 24 June 419 on the Nativity of St. John the Baptist. It also had the oldest baptismal fonts of Nantes (fifth century). At the end of the fifth century, Gregory of Tours, in his De gloria Martyrum, designated the church as the Basilica antistis Similini, thus making it the second basilica in Nantes at that time alongside the Basilica of St. Donatian and St. Rogatian.

In 848, during the Viking raids, Nantes was ransacked. The church was looted but not destroyed, and the relics of St. Similen deposited at the well disappeared at that time. In 958, a procession allowed Bishop Gauthier and his canons to launch a public subscription to undertake the restoration of the building, which was completed around 1172 by the Duke of Brittany Geoffrey II.

Following the siege of Nantes by Louis XI in 1487, Bishop Peter of Chaffault repaired and enlarged the basilica, rebuilding it in the form of a Latin cross. The apse was Merovingian but the nave was extended towards the west, and flanked by two crosses. The bell tower to the west, raised 1.20 meters above street level, measured 32.43 m high and consisted of: a square tower with a height of 17.30 m and an area of 30 m2, supported by buttresses and decorated with narrow basket-handle windows to illuminate the staircase; a wooden belfry with a 3.50 m-high peak; a pavilion with a height of 6.05 m; a slate spire of 3.48 meters high topped by a ball and a cross with a height of 2 meters.

During the French Revolution, the church was closed to worship in 1793 and reopened after the Concordat of 1802. In 1824, the millennium-old building was destroyed and replaced with a new church with three naves. The façade and portico were completed in 1835.

Fifteen years later, in 1850, the parish priest and the church council were considering the construction of a new church. In 1869, an architect, Eugène Boismen was appointed. He planned a Gothic building inspired by those of the early 13th century. The northwest facing building was to include three naves, two ambulatory spaces, and an apse with a chapel where Our Lady of Mercy was to be placed. The five-bay nave ended with a façade with two spires. Permission was granted in 1872 to build the new church. The Bishop Félix Fournier blessed the first stone of the new sanctuary on 5 October 1873. The work was completed in 1894 but as early as 1880, the vaults of the apse, the choir, and transept were completed.

François Bougoüin took over from Boismen in 1891. The sanctuary is accessed by a wide staircase of eight steps overlooking Piazza San Similien.

In 1902, a new priest began façade work that would never be completed due to a 1905 law on the separation of church and state which ended financing for the project. The two planned bell towers were not built. The twin bells of the old sanctuary, which were brought down from their tower on 8 July 1894, have been waiting for a new location since 1820. The bells were blessed in 1819, one in the name of St. Anne (weighing 1,200 kg), and the other in the name of St. Similien (weighing 800 kg).
