= Similien of Nantes =

Catholic Saint

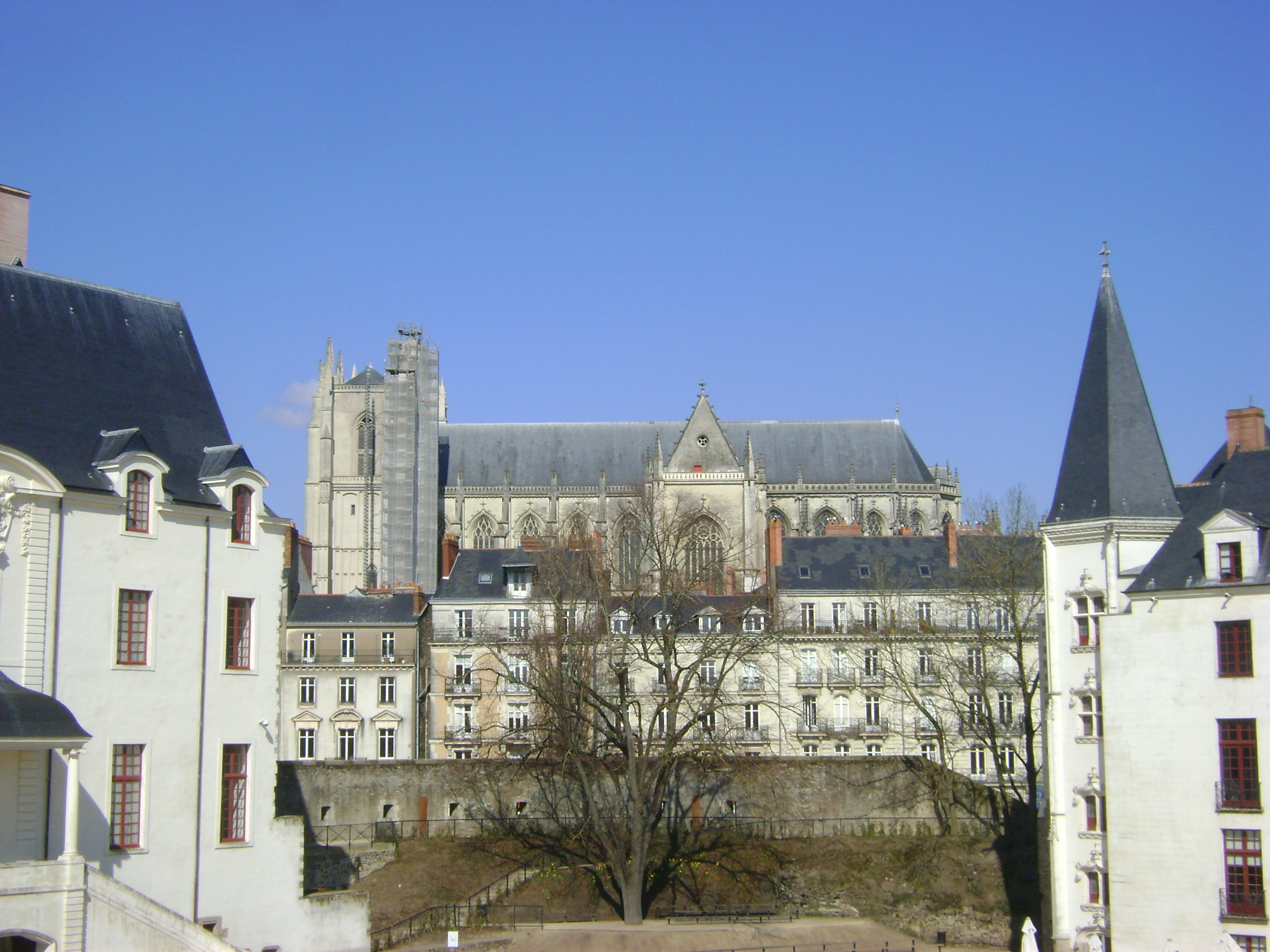
Cathédrale de Nantes.

Similien, or Similianus, was a 4th-century, French bishop and Saint.

St. Similien lived in the early fourth century and was the third bishop of Nantes, who, according to St. Gregory of Tours, was given the title of grand confessor. He is recorded as converting to Christianity a certain Donatian, who in turn brought to the Christian faith his brother Rogatian.

== Life ==
During the persecution under Emperor Diocletian (284-305), the believers had begged him to leave the city with his clergy. In an old book on Breton saints, he is summarized as follows:

"This worthy prelate remained unyielding and steadfast during the cruel persecutions of Diocletian and Maximian, and wisely led the ship that was entrusted to him. To protect his flock, this good shepherd repeatedly withstood the rage of the wolves. They had bitten him, and he suffered there. With God's help, he could always escape them or even tame them. He personally buried the venerable remains of the two heroes of the faith: Donatianus and Rogatianus († 287; feast May 24). Eventually he was allowed to experience peace falling over the church. As the winner of the protracted storm, he was the first bishop in Nantes, so drenched in the blood of Christian martyrs, that the light did break through to better times. After having demonstrated his holiness in many ways, he died in the Lord."

== Veneration ==
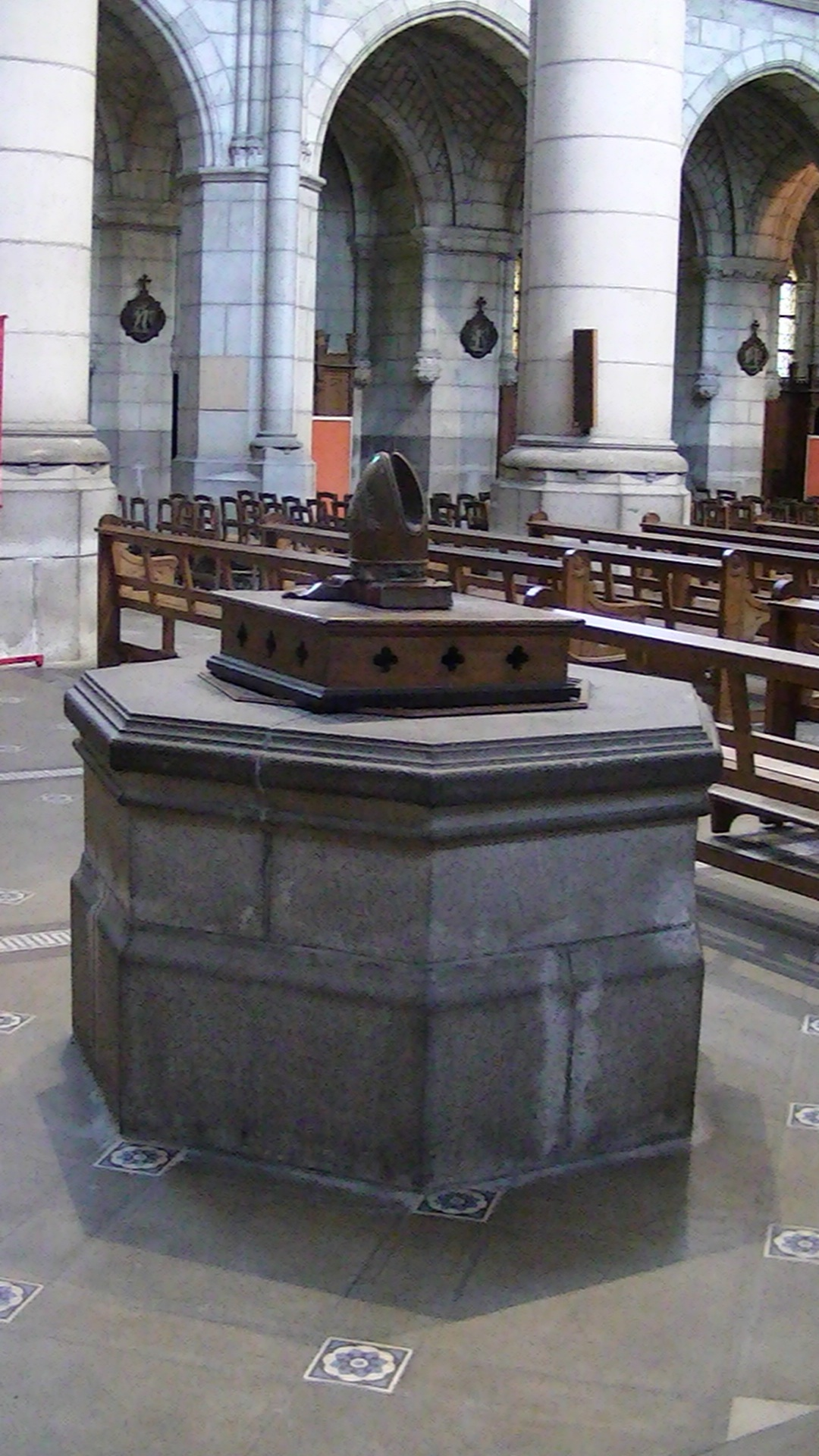
Similien of Nantes well.jpg

He has a church in the city of Nantes, situated on a hill on the Erdre. This site stems from very early times. According to an old tradition, the church stands on his grave. It would also have been the place where he retired during the persecutions, which may be true to the extent that the site was at least located outside the walls of the former city.

In the days of Clovis († 511; feast Nov. 27), the city was spared from a Saxon invasion. The siege lasted sixty days until one night, the besiegers saw a procession of white-clad figures from the church, each carrying a candle. They then saw a similar procession from the Church of Saint Donatian, and the Saxons were thrown into such panic that they abandoned their positions and fled.

When the Normans conquered the city in 843, they were said to have thrown the remains of Similien into a well. In the Middle Ages, pilgrims came to drink from the well in the hope of healing.
