= Donatien =

Donatien is a masculine given name of French origin. People with that name include:

- Amédée Donatien Doublemard (1826–1900), French sculptor and medalist
- Donatien Alphonse François de Sade, (1740–1814), French nobleman, revolutionary politician, philosopher, and writer
- Donatien Bouché (1882–1965), French sailor who competed in the 1928 Summer Olympics
- Donatien de Bruyne (1871–1935), French biblical scholar, textual critic, and Benedictine
- Donatien Mortelette (born 1982), French rower
- Donatien Schauly (born 1985), French equestrian who competed in the 2012 Summer Olympics
- Donatien-Marie-Joseph de Vimeur, vicomte de Rochambeau (1755–1813), French soldier, son of Jean-Baptiste
- Émile-Bernard Donatien (1887–1955), French actor and film director
- Jacques-Donatien Le Ray de Chaumont (1726–1803), French aristocrat
- Jean-Baptiste Donatien de Vimeur, comte de Rochambeau (1725–1807), French nobleman and general during the American Revolution
- Donatien Laurent (1935–2020), Breton ethnologist.

== See also ==
- Donatian (disambiguation)
- Donation (disambiguation)
