= Naessens =

Naessens is a Dutch patronymic surname, "Naes" or "Naas" being short for "Donaas", a Dutch form of Donatian.

== People ==
- Gaston Naessens (1924–?), developer of 714-X claimed treatment
- Jens Naessens (born 1991), Belgian footballer
- Jet Naessens (1915–2010), Belgian actress and director
- Marie-Thérèse Naessens (born 1939), Belgian racing cyclist
- Willy Naessens (1939–2025), Belgian industrialist
