= Gil-Pérès =

French actor (1822–1882)

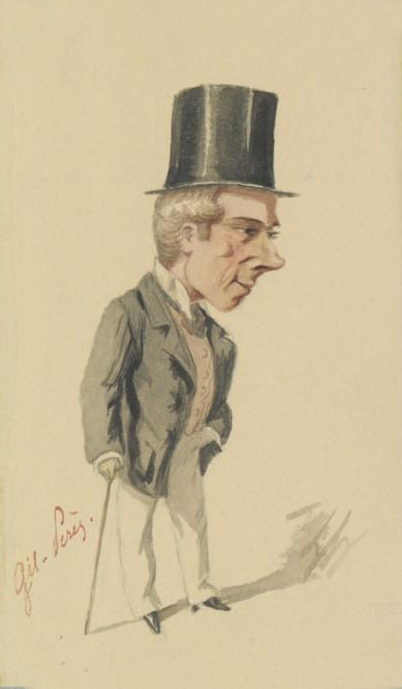
- Gil-Pérès in the role of Cascaro (Les trois fils de Cadet-Roussel) : portrait by Lhéritier (1860)
- Born: Jules-Charles Pérès Jolin; 9 July 1822; Paris
- Died: 30 January 1882 (aged 59); Vanves
- Occupation: Stage actor

Gil-Pérès, real name Jules-Charles Pérès Jolin, (9 July 1822 – 30 January 1882) was a 19th-century French stage actor and vaudevilliste, who was a member of the troupe of the Théâtre du Palais-Royal in Paris in the mid-19th century, and created several roles in Offenbach operettas.

He was also noted for his collaboration in the plays of Labiche, often as servants.

He was buried in Passy Cemetery, where his epitaph is « le connaître, c’était l’aimer » ("to know him was to love him"); the monument was sculpted by Amédée Donatien Doublemard.

He is portrayed in the 1977 French television series 'Les Folies Offenbach' by Christian Marin.

== Some roles ==
- 1852 (8 May): Les Suites d'un premier lit, one-act comedy mingled with songs by Eugène Labiche, Théâtre du Vaudeville : Piquoiseau
- 1854 (9 September) : Le Baiser à l'étrier, vaudeville in one act by Edouard Brisebarre, Eugène Nyon, Théâtre du Palais-Royal
- 1857 (26 January) : Le Bras d'Ernest, vaudeville, Théâtre du Palais-Royal : title role
- 1860 : Les Trois Fils de Cadet-Roussel by Michel Delaporte, Charles Varin and Paul Laurencin, Théâtre du Palais-Royal
- 1861 : La Beauté du diable, vaudeville in 3 acts by Eugène Grangé and Lambert-Thiboust, Théâtre du Palais-Royal : La Roussotte
- 1863 (9 May): Le Brésilien, comedy by Henri Meilhac and Ludovic Halévy, Théâtre du Palais-Royal
- 1864 (21 December): Le Photographe, comédie-vaudeville by Henri Meilhac and Ludovic Halévy, Théâtre du Palais-Royal
- 1865 : La Succession Bonnet; comédie-vaudeville, by the duc de Morny, with a rondeau for Gridou (Gil-Pérès) by Offenbach, Corps législatif
- 1866 (2 May) : Le Myosotis, vaudeville in one act, by William Busnach, music by Charles Lecocq, Théâtre du Palais-Royal : Cornillon
- 1866 (31 October): La Vie parisienne, opéra-bouffe by Jacques Offenbach, libretto by Henri Meilhac and Ludovic Halévy, Théâtre du Palais-Royal: Bobinet
- 1868 (6 May): Le château à Toto, opéra bouffe in three acts, music by Offenbach, libretto by Henri Meilhac and Ludovic Halevy, Théâtre du Palais-Royal: Le Baron de Crécy-Crécy
- 1874 (2 April) : Le Homard, vaudeville in one act, by Edmond Gondinet Théâtre du Palais-Royal : Romanèche
- 1874 (24 November) : La Boule, comédie in four acts, by Henry Meilhac and Ludovic Halevy, Théâtre du Palais-Royal : La Musardière
