= Gamete donation =

Gamete donation is the donation of gametes, either ova or sperm, and may thus refer to:

- Egg donation
- Sperm donation
