= Donatian and Rogatian =

Roman Christian martyrs killed circa 288–290

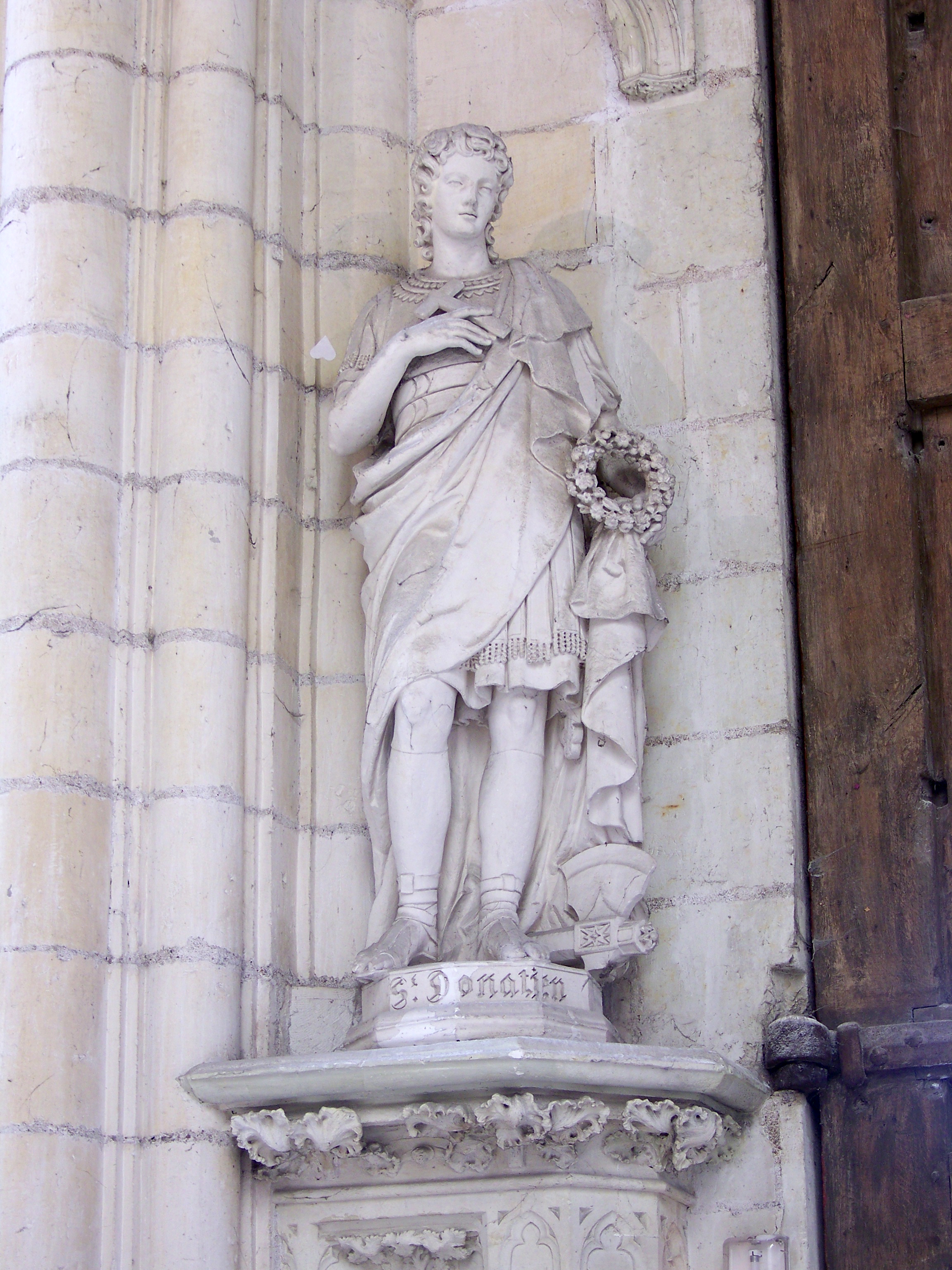
- St. Donatian
- Died: around 288-290; Nantes
- Venerated in: Roman Catholic Church, Eastern Orthodox Church
- Feast: 24 May

Donatian and Rogatian were two brothers, martyred in Nantes during the reign of Roman Emperor Maximian, around 288–290, for refusing to deny their faith. They are also known as les enfants nantais. Their feast day is 24 May.

== Life ==
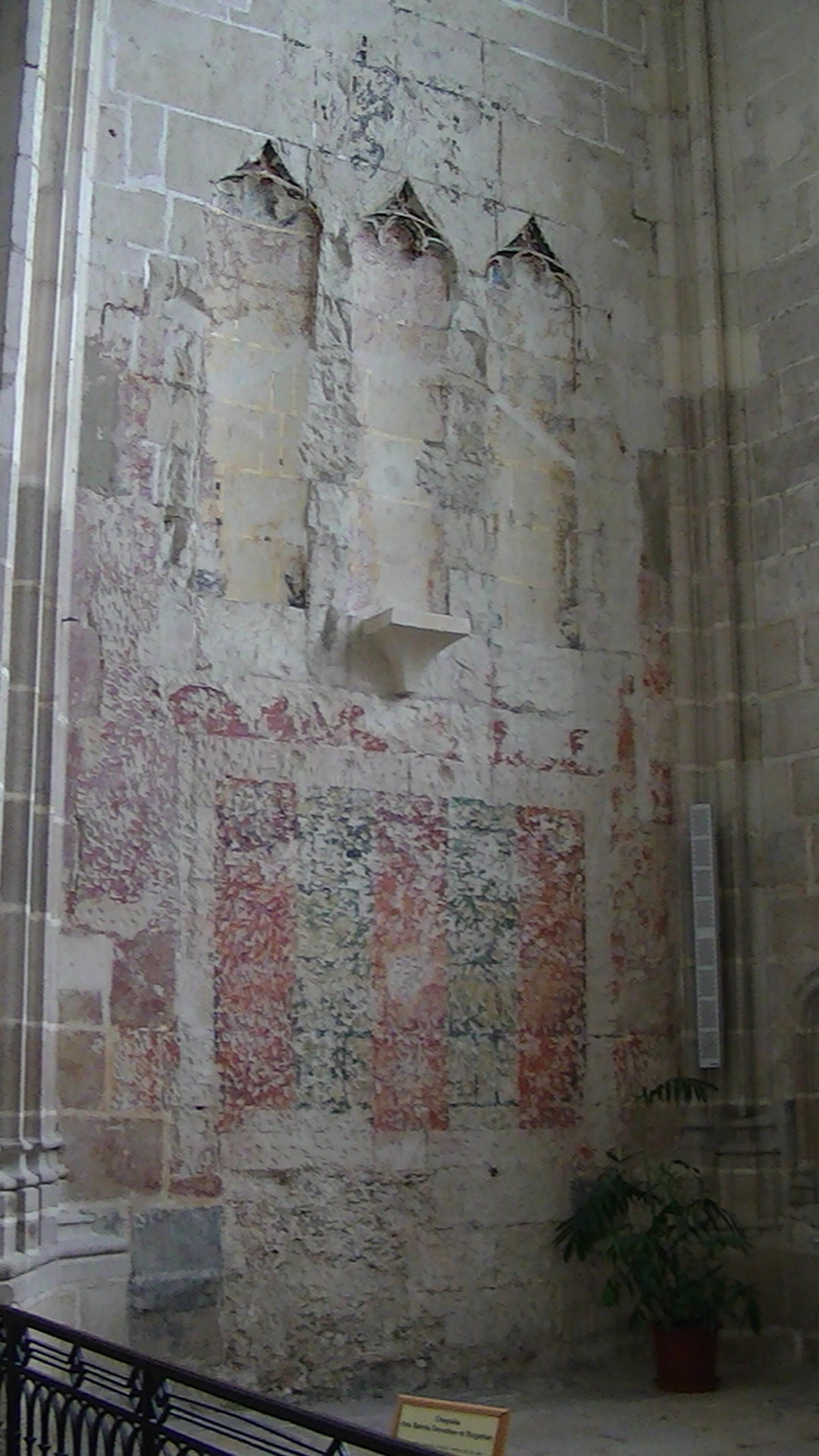
Chapel of St. Donatian and St. Rogatian, Cathédrale de Nantes.

The story of St. Donatian and his brother St. Rogatian is known from a 5th-century document, "the Passion of Children of Nantes". This is the basis for all later works, which also added some extra information to the legend, for example the tradition that they were related to a "illustrious" Armorican family.

St. Donatian and St. Rogatian were, it seems, the sons of the first magistrate of the city. Donatian, the youngest, was baptized (probably by St. Similien, third bishop of Nantes, who outlived them). Donatian then evangelized his older brother, Rogatian. The family property, a Gallo-Roman villa, also home to the first Christian church built in Nantes, stood on the site of the current Basilica of St. Donatien-et-Saint-Rogatien. According to tradition, the church was built at the location of their graves, which was in their home, as was customary.

According to the story, after being denounced as Christians, they were arrested and appeared before the imperial prefect, the provincial governor, who asked them to sacrifice to idols. When they refused, they were tortured and spent their last night praying together. That night, Rogatian regretted that he was going to die without being baptized, but his brother reassured him, telling him that the blood of his martyrdom would take the place of baptism.

They were pierced by the spear of a lictor and then beheaded on the morning of 24 May 304. According to tradition, their martyrdom took place outside the city walls, at the site of the current no. 63 rue Dufour on the old road from Paris, near the Eugene-Livet High School and not far from the basilica dedicated to them.

== Veneration ==
They are commemorated throughout the Loire Valley, as far as Orléans, where their relics were displaced at the time of the Norman invasions, and then deposited in the ninth or tenth century in their namesake basilica in a reliquary of gold. These relics were scattered during the French Revolution, a wooden shrine replacing the previous reliquary. Both have statues on either side of the main portal in the narthex of the Cathedral Saint-Pierre and Saint-Paul de Nantes. There is also a painting in the cathedral by Théophile Vauchelet. A church in Orléans is also named after St. Donatian.

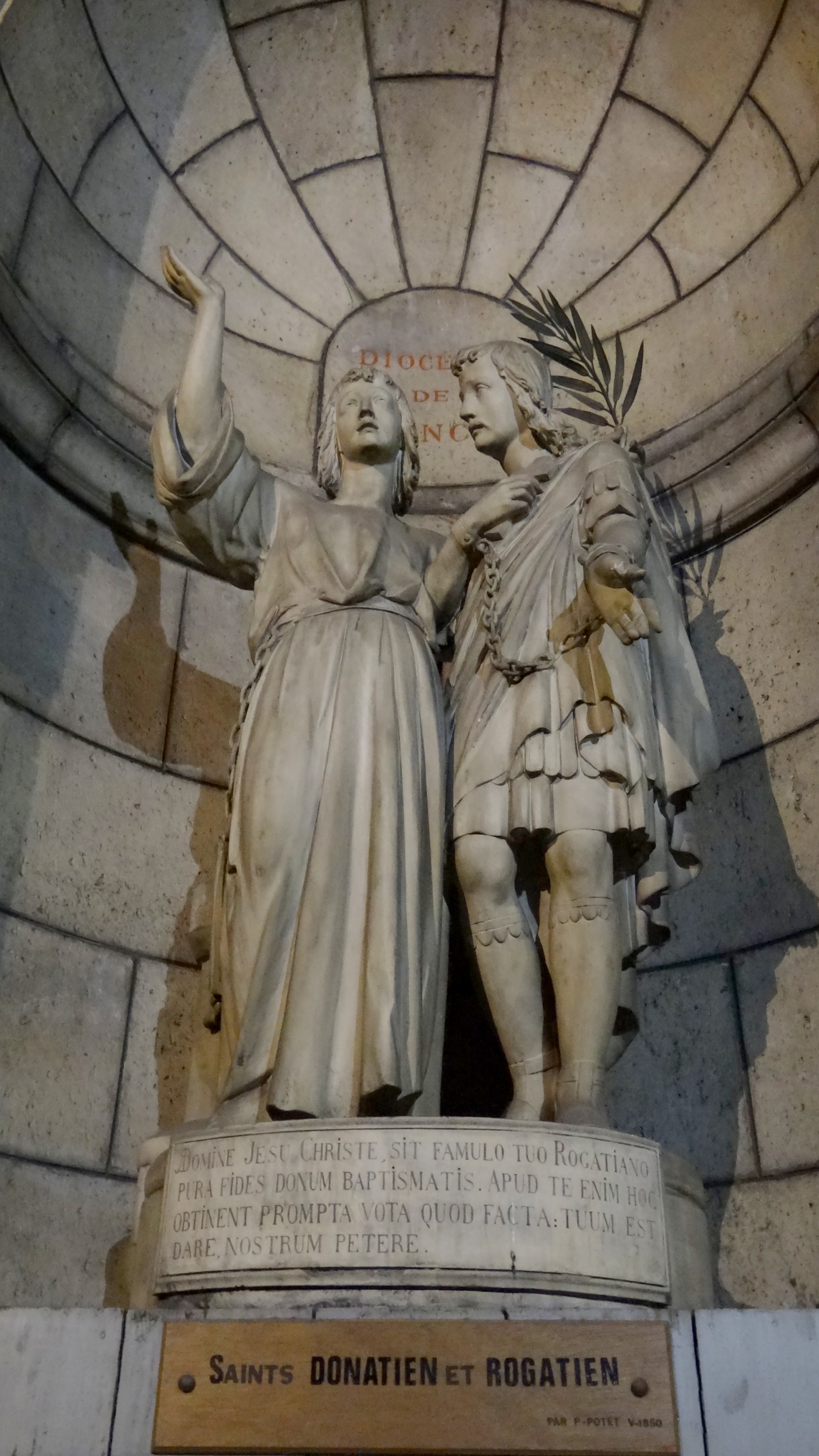
Saints Donatian and Rogatian (P. Potet, 1850), crypt of Sacré-Cœur de Montmartre in Paris

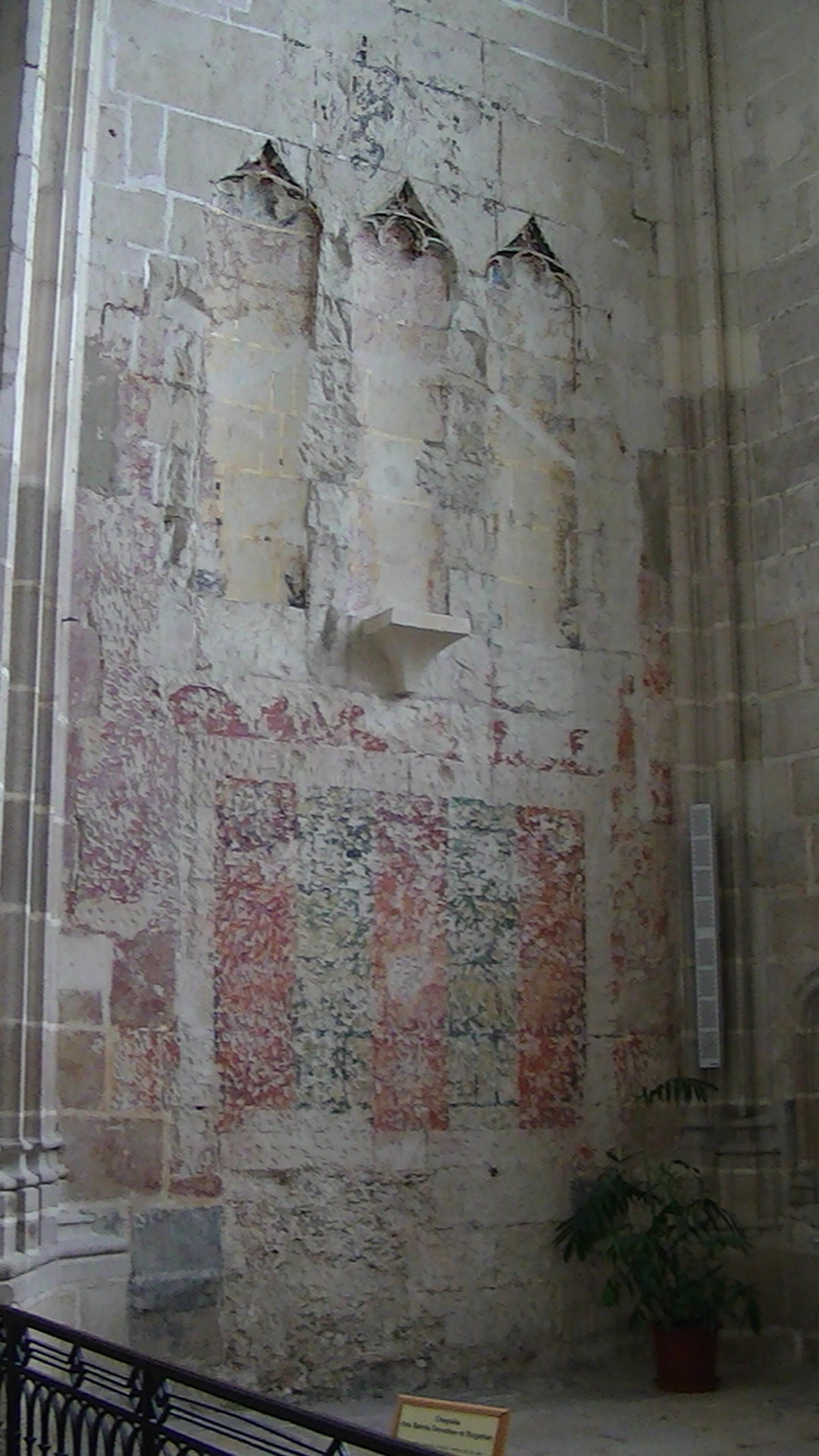
Chapel of St. Donatian and St. Rogatian, Cathédrale de Nantes.
