= Théodore-Charles Gruyère =

French artist

- Born: September 17, 1813; Paris, France
- Died: March 1, 1885 (aged 71); Paris, France
- Occupation: Sculptor
- Notable work: Seated Indian (1865), sandstone statues in Église Saint-Augustin de Paris, sculptures at Gare du Nord

Théodore-Charles Gruyère (17 September 1813 – 1 March 1885) was a French sculptor.

In 1836 as the pupil of Auguste Dumont. He hit notoriety in 1839 winning the Prix de Rome.

His other works are some busts, some statues of saints for several churches, including the sandstone statues in the Église Saint-Augustin de Paris (1865), the sculpture named Seated Indian (1865), the characters of the town of Arras and Laon on the front of the Gare du Nord and a bas-relief in the Église Saint-Thomas-d'Aquin (Paris).
