= Donation, Pennsylvania =

Unincorporated community in Pennsylvania, U.S.

Coordinates: 40°34′00″N 77°56′16″W

Donation is an unincorporated community in Huntingdon County, Pennsylvania, United States.

== History ==
A post office called Donation was established in 1856, and remained in operation until 1905. The origin of the name "Donation" is obscure.
