= Amédée Donatien Doublemard =

French sculptor

Amédée Donatien Doublemard (8 January 1826 – 20 July 1900) was a French sculptor and medalist. He was born at Beaurain in Nord and was taught by Francisque Duret. In 1842, he enrolled at the École des Beaux-Arts of Paris and began exhibiting his work at the Paris Salon of 1844. He died in Paris on 20 July 1900. In 1855 he shared the Prix de Rome with Henri Chapu. This entitled him to study at Rome where he stayed for three years. On his return to Paris, he was kept busy creating busts of the rich and famous of the period. He also completed several important public works such as his La France en deuil déposant une couronne sur la tombe des soldats morts pour sa défense, le 19 janvier 1871 for Saint-Quentin, his monument honouring Bon-Adrien Jeannot de Moncey in Paris and his monument to Camille Desmoulins in Guise in the Aisne. He was named a Chevalier de la Légion d'honneur in 1877 and received a variety of prizes and medals including a silver medal at the 1889 Exposition universelle. Félix Charpentier was a pupil of his. He bequeathed to the Institute his collection of art to assist students preparing to compete for the Prix de Rome.

== Works ==
Name	Location	Photograph	Date	Notes
Étude d'homme	Whereabouts not known	—	1844	Doublemard's first ever submission to the Paris Salon in 1844.
Piété filiale de Cléobis et Biton	Ecole Nationale Supérieure des Beaux-Arts in Paris	—	1855	This work executed in 1855 won the Prix de Rome in that year.
Monument to Maréchal Jean-Mathieu-Philibert Sérurier	See comment	—	1863	Statue erected in Laon in 1863 having been cast in bronze by A.Laurent. Destroyed by the Germans in the course of the 1914-1918 war. Re-erected in 1932 to 1934 but requisitioned by Germans in 1941, melted down to reuse bronze and never replaced. The work had been shown at the Paris Salon of 1865.
Monument to Jean Béranger	Paris	—	1885	The bronze statue of Béranger had stood in Paris' Square du Temple until 1942 when it was dismantled in order to re-use the bronze content. In 1953 a new sculpture was erected, sculpted by Henri Lagriffoul
Alexander Killing Himself in front of the corpse of his friend Clitus	Laon	—	1853	A bas-relief in plaster
Hector and Astyanax	Laon	—	1854	A model in plaster
Bust of Monsieur Haunet	Église Sainte-Marguerite.Paris	—	1853	Bust in marble. Haunet had served as a priest at Sainte Marguerite.
Le Nord	See comment	—	1855 to 1857	This sculpture was removed and melted down by the Germans but fortunately the Musée d'Orsay have a drawing by Edouard Denis Baldus in their collection so we can see how the sculpture would have looked. The relief had decorated Paris' Palais du Louvre.
Bust of the Abbé de Feletz	Whereabouts unknown	—		Bust of the cleric Charles-Marie de Feletz
Bust of Le Carlier d'Ardon Marc Jean François Philibert	Laon	—	1885	Bust of the French politician
Enfance de Bacchus	Had stood in the Jardin des Plantes (Deux-Sèvres) in Niort	—		Dismantled for the bronze content during 1939-1945 war. This was the final work carried out by Doublemard whilst he studied at the French Academy in Rome.
Monument to Maréchal de Moncey	Place Clichy. Paris			Monument remembers Moncey's role in the 1814 defence of Paris. The monument's column has reliefs depicting Moncey's actions. The bas-reliefs are entitled "Le combat de la barrière de Clichy", "La Patrie en deuil" and "Le Patriotisme"
Bust of Fouquier d'Hérouille	Musée Saint-Quentin	—		
Sculpture for the Louvre	Paris	—		Sculpture for the Aile de Marsan.
Admiral Ferdinand-Alphonse Hamelin	Musée du château de Versailles	—	1864	A bust in marble shown at the Paris Salon of 1868
Bust of Augustin Magdelain	Musée de Picardie in Amiens	—	1865	Marble bust dates to 1865
Statues of Saint Thomas d'Aquin and Saint Bonaventure	Sainte-Trinité, Paris	—	1867	Statues of two Saints executed for the Église de la Trinité
Monument to Marie-François Auguste de Caffarelli du Falga	Leschelles	—	1865	The monument used Doublemard's 1860 bust of Caffarelli
Bust of Ambroise Thomas	Whereabouts not known	—	1874	This bust of the French composer was shown at the 1874 Salon.
War memorial in Saint Quentin to the dead of the 1870 war	Cimetière Saint-Jean in Saint-Quentin	—	1874	The original bronze sculpture by Doublemard was melted down during the Vichy regime to re-use the bronze. Replacement sculpture carried out by Diosi.
Bust of Odilon Barrot	Whereabouts not known	—	1878	This bust was shown at the 1878 Éxposition universelle
Monument to Bolivar	Guayaquil	—	1874	Sculpture dates to 1874
Jeune Faune et panthère	Whereabouts not known	—	1875	Work in plaster shown at the Paris Salon of 1875
Bust of Charles Picard	musée Antoine Lécuyer Saint Quentin.	—	1879	1879 bust.
Bust of Victor Suin	Laon	—		Bust of the French politician
Bust of Léon Bienvenu	Vervins (Aisne)	—		Bust located in Vervins Hôtel de ville The bust was a gift given to Vervins by Bienvenu's daughter in 1932.
Bust of Louis Lefèbre	Omaha	—		
La Comédie	théâtre de la Gaîté-Lyrique, 3bis, rue Papin		-	Doublemard's statue "La Comédie" decorates the front of the Théâtre de la Gaîté
Bust of Adolphe Yvon	Château de Versailles	—		Bust of the painter Adolphe Yvon
Bust of Henri Martin		—	1887	This was shown at the 1887 Paris Salon and was purchased by the French State for the Musée du Trocadéro.
Monument to Jean-Baptiste André Godin	Guise	The replacement statue of Godin	1888	Doublemard's original plaster model of the figure of Godin was shown at the Paris Salon of 1882. A bronze casting was made and this was the centre-piece of the monument erected in Godin's honour after his death with sculpture by Doublemard and Tony-Noël. The monument fell victim to the occupying German's thirst for bronze and it was dismantled and melted down during the 1914-1918 war. It was replaced in 1923 with a replica fashioned by Felix Charpentier.
Monument to Camille Desmoulins	See note.	The 1949 version of Camille Desmoulins statue in Guise	1882	Doublemard had shown the plaster version of his Desmoulins figure at the Paris Salon of 1882 and this was cast in bronze and erected in 1890 in Guise's place d'Armes. Desmoulins, a French revolutionary, had been born in Guise. Doublemard added two bas-reliefs to the monument these depicting scenes from Desmoulins' life. After the war Félix Charpentier created another bronze of Desmoulins, replicating Doublemard's work, this cast by Durenne and Val d'Osne of Paris but before this was erected on the pedestal a marble bust of Desmoulins by Alexandre Lesquien served as a temporary replacement. Ironically Charpentier's bronze suffered the same fate as Doublemard's and was dismantled and melted down by the Germans during the occupation of the Second World War. It was replaced yet again in 1949 it is thought using Charpentier's original plaster cast.
Regnard	Whereabouts not known	—	1891	This work in marble was shown at the 1891 Paris Salon and was purchased by the French State for the Théâtre national de l'Odéon
Bust of Octave Feuillet	Whereabouts not known	—	1894	A work in marble purchased by the French State at the Paris Salon of 1894.
Medal for Animal Protection Society of Paris		—	Around 1895	On the obverse of the medal there is a representation of Justice holding a pair of scales surrounded by various animals. Just below the scales there is reference to The law of 2nd July 1850. On the reverse, within a border of two laurel branches, the medal is engraved with the name of Mr.Desfosses. The rim of the medal is stamped with « Cuivre » to indicate it is made from copper.

== Funereal work ==
Name	Location	Photograph	Date	Notes
Decoration of the tomb of Edmond Morin.	Sceaux	—	1884	Composition Les instruments du peintre for the painter Morin's tomb.
The tomb of Jules Garcin	Cimetière Montmartre Paris	—	1874	The sculpture for the tomb of the French composer and violinist dates to 1886.
The tomb of Gil-Pérès | Passy Cemetery	—	1885	Marble sculpture on Gil-Perès' tomb.	
The tomb of Philippe Ricord	Père-Lachaise Cemetery Paris			The bust of Ricord with attendant cherubs decorates a small chapel built over his tomb.
The tomb of François Bazin	Père-Lachaise Cemetery Paris		1879	The bust used for Bazin's tomb was shown at the Paris Salon of 1879.
The tomb of Alphonse Gabriel Victor Paillet	Père-Lachaise Paris Cemetery			Doubemard carried out sculptural work for Paillet's tomb.
The tomb of Jean-Baptiste Godin, Founder of the "Association du Familistère"	Guise	Old postcard showing monument over Godin tomb. Shows the bust of Godin and the two seated figures "Le travail" and "La Famille" and above the bust the composition L'Immortalité	1889	Two seated figures in bronze depicting Le Travail (work) and La Famille (family) were executed by Doublemard and Edme Anthony Paul Tony-Noel for Godin's tomb in Guise's allée des Peupliers. Le Travail is represented by a foundry worker with anvil and hammer whilst a woman holding a baby represented La Famille. Casting was by Denonvilliers of Vouvray. The bronze high-relief composition L'Immortalité for Godin's tomb was cast by Denonvilliers in 1889 and based on a plaster model by Doublemard and Edme Tony-Noél. This figure was placed above Godin's bust and above the seated figures of work and the family
