= Basilica of St. Donatian and St. Rogatian =

Catholic church in Nantes, France

Coordinates: 47.2292588°N 1.5424418°W

- Basilique Saint-Donatien-et-Saint-Rogatien
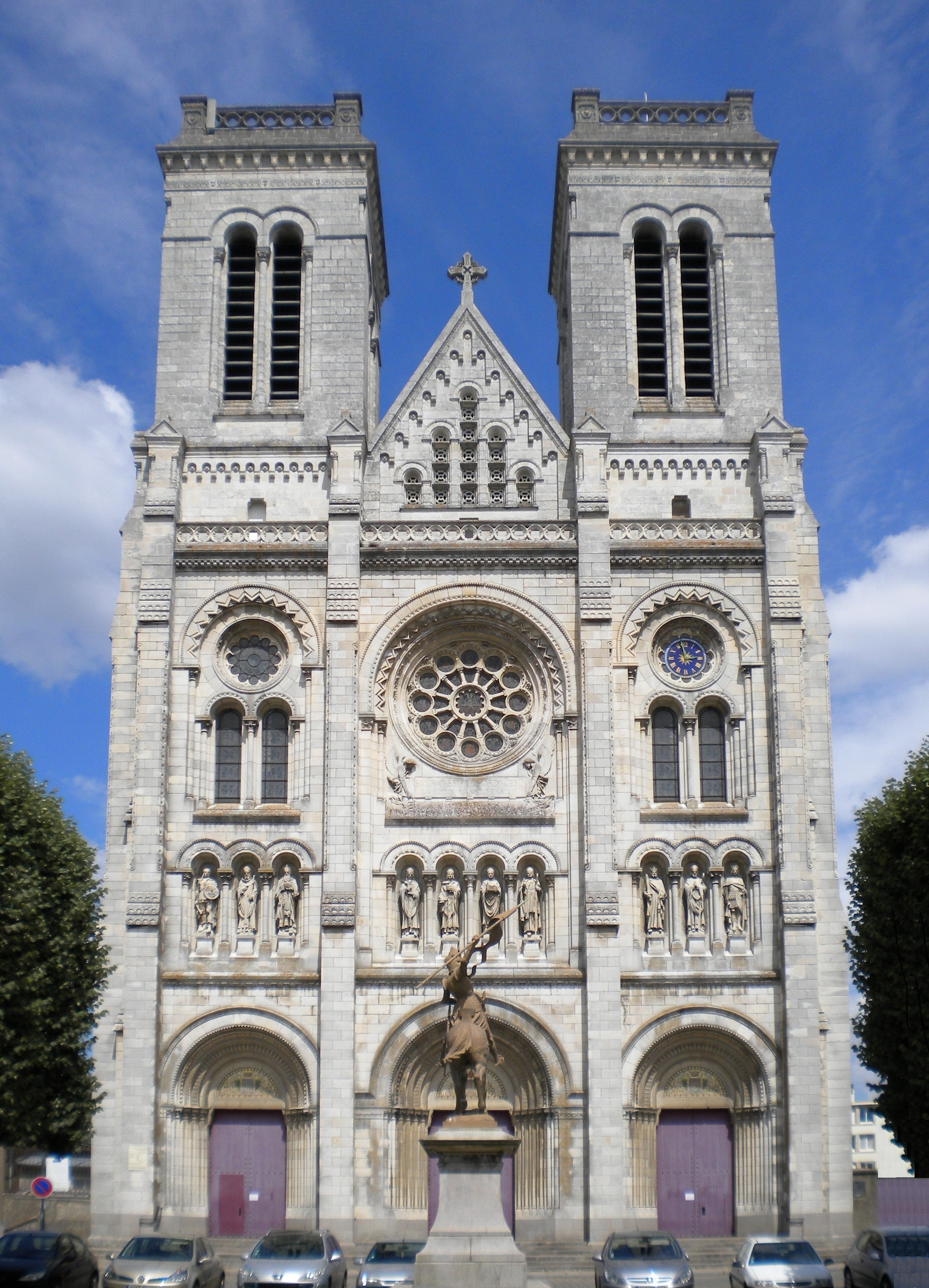

Religion
- Affiliation: Catholic
- Rite: Roman Rite
- Ecclesiastical or organizational status: minor basilica
- Patron: Donatian and Rogatian
- Status: active

Location
- Location: Nantes, France
- Interactive map of Basilica of St. Donatian and St. Rogatian

Architecture
- Groundbreaking: 1872
- Completed: 1889

Basilica of St. Donatian and St. Rogatian (French: Basilique Saint-Donatien-et-Saint-Rogatien) is a Catholic minor basilica in Nantes, France. The church was built in the late 19th century and is dedicated to saints Donatian and Rogatian. It was elevated to the rank of minor basilica in 1889.

== History ==
=== Roman era ===
The church building stands on the site of an ancient Gallo-Roman villa. Excavations in 1873 brought to light an ancient pagan cemetery, a pit in the center of the apse containing 27 nails assigned to the coffins of the two martyrs and reveal that four church buildings were successively below the basilica.

The promulgation of the Edict of Constantine, nine years after the death of the martyrs, sees developing a cult around the bodies of two brothers as martyrs, first dislocated on the rack, whipped and driven out of the city not far from the current basilica, at the No. 63 rue Dufour, where an executioner speared them in the throat and then beheaded them. According to tradition, their bodies are placed, 21 years after their death, in a gray marble sarcophagus, measuring 2.25 meters long and 75 centimeters wide. The relics then attract pilgrims, requiring the creation of a "guard of honor" consists of the monks of St. Martin. The parish was then considered by Nantais as a "holy land" .

The first church was built in the tradition of family ownership of Nantes saints to 490.

=== Middle Ages ===
The Norman invasions destroyed the first building, but once peace returned, a new church building was built around the year 980. However, according Dubuisson-Aubenay, the primitive sanctuary remnants still exist in the 17th century, including an ancient apse.

=== Revolutionary era ===
16 March 1739, the foundation stone of the reconstruction is by Jean-Marie de Trevelec, adviser to the Parliament of Brittany and his wife Françoise Charrette.

Transformed into a hospital during the French Revolution, it was sold in 1796. Once the church returned to use for worship in 1802, the missing parts were reconstructed from 1804, giving birth to a larger church of cruciform shape, consecrated by Bishop Duvoisin 28 March 1806.

=== Current basilica ===
The current building dates from the 19th century. It is dedicated to St. Donatian and St. Rogatian. It was elevated to the rank of minor basilica on 14 March 1889.

=== 2015 fire ===
On 15 June 2015 a major fire occurred at the basilica. The fire started at around 8.30 GMT, during morning Mass, in the roof of the building. The back and roof of the basilica were severely damaged. According to the local director of public safety, the disaster happened accidentally while two roofers working on the refurbishment of the building, repairing a lead gutter with an oxy-fuel torch. The cost is set at two million euros. The basilica is prohibited for the moment the public, this ban will be lifted after the first phase of mid-December.

On 20 October 2015, repair work began on the Basilica. The work will be divided into three phases and should be completed by 2019. In March 2019 it was expected that the restoration works would be completed in Spring 2021, and the basilica opened on 29 August 2021.
