= Élisa Mercœur =

French poet, writer and essayist

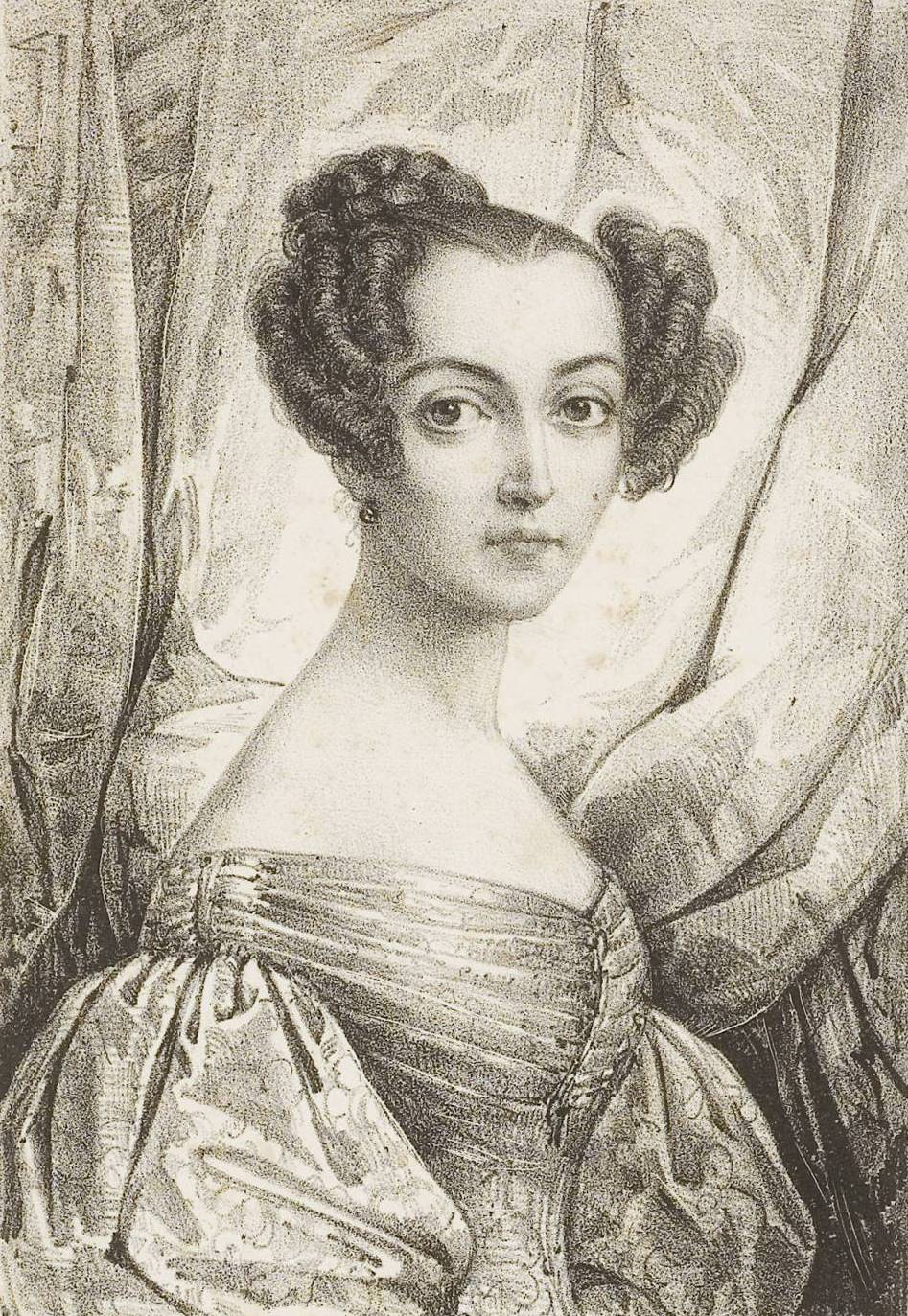
- Élisa Mercœur by Auguste Belin
- Born: 24 June 1809; Saint-Sébastien-sur-Loire, Nantes, France
- Died: 7 January 1835 (aged 25); Paris, France
- Resting place: Père-Lachaise Cemetery
- Occupations: Writer, poet, essayist
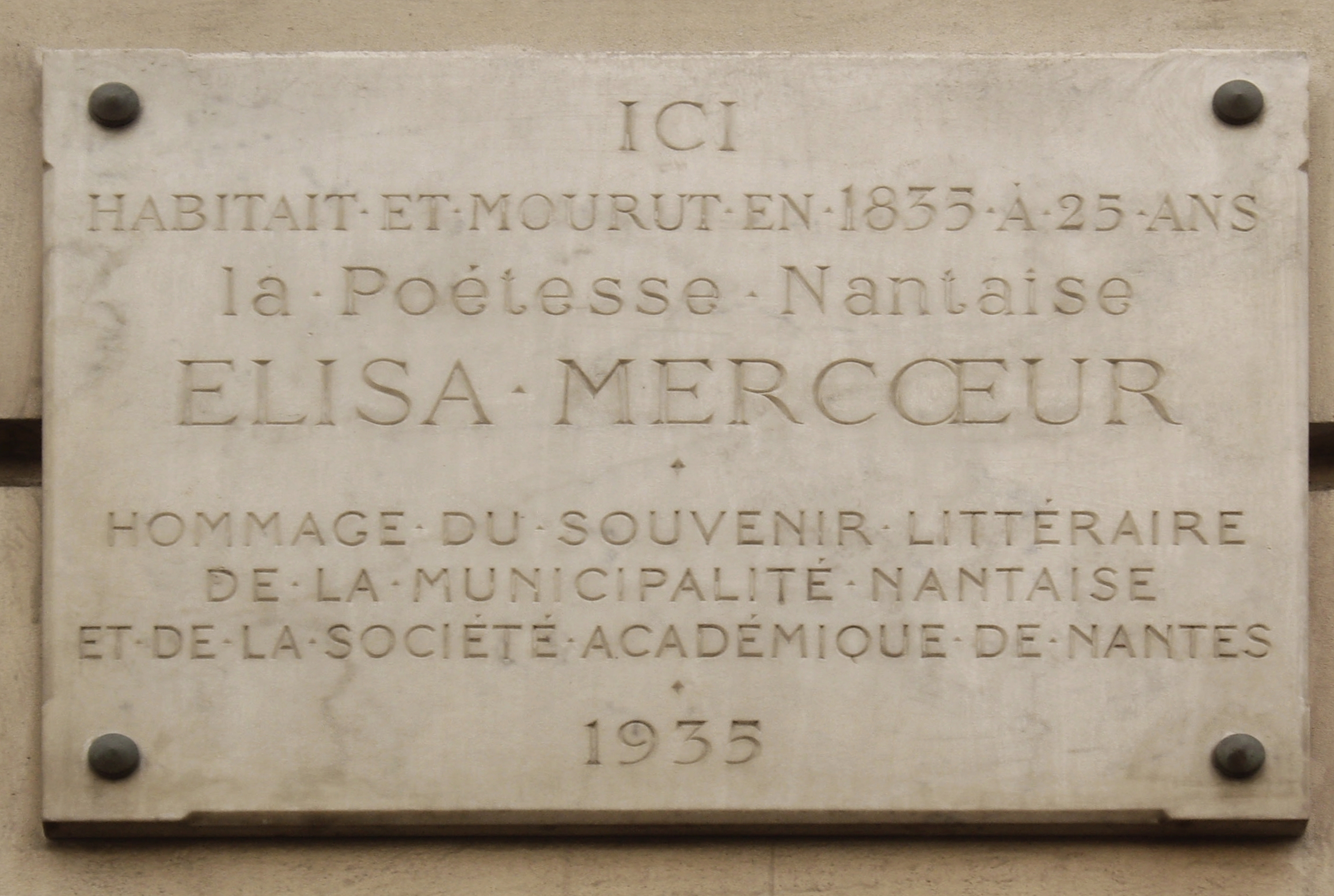
- Plaque at 43 rue du Bac, Paris 7e, where Mercœur lived and died.

Signature
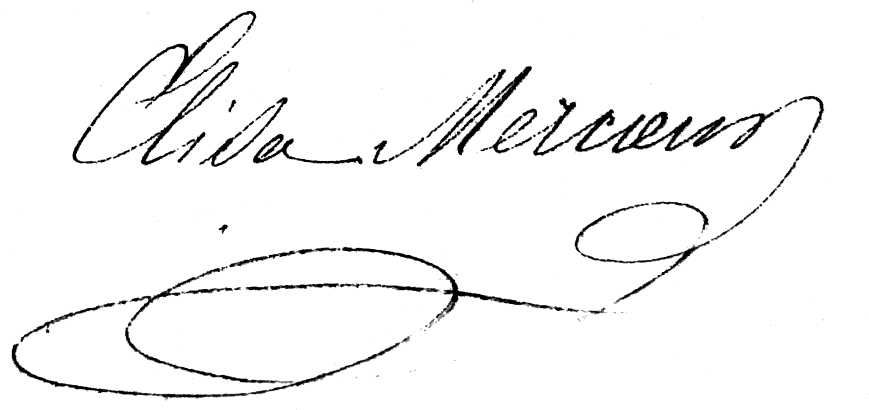

Élisa Mercœur (24 June 1809 in Saint-Sébastien-sur-Loire, 7 January 1835 in Paris) was a French writer, poet and essayist and was one of the most prominent names in Breton Romanticism. Mercœur was a child prodigy and autodidact, who published two collections of elegies, the first one when she was 16. During her lifetime, she was known as "La Muse armoricaine" (The Armorican Muse) and was widely known throughout France. After Mercœur's death in 1835, her mother posthumously edited her work to ensure it survived for posterity and in the process constructed much of her modern image as a virginal child prodigy. According to Wendy Greenberg, "her notoriety was based on an apparent acceptance of dominant views concerning femininity and shows clear engagement with the model of masculine genius and voice". Mercœur is renowned more for her tragically short life rather than her poetry, which has largely been forgotten. It wasn't until 1990 with the publication of Geoffroy Daniel's biography "Elisa Mercoeur Nantaise romantique" that she began to be more widely known.

== Life ==
Mercoeur's mother was Adèlaïde (or Adèle) Aumand, an embroiderer who was born in 1780 in Nantes. Her father was Jules-François Barré, a solicitor in the Vendée department of the Les Landes-Genusson region. Adélaïde came from a bourgeois family, her father was a surgeon, her grandfather a notary. Her job as an embroiderer corresponded to the professional use of a hobby for young girls of good society.

A number of biographical details were provided by her mother in her Memoirs. However, she does not mention a significant aspect of Élisa's life: she was abandoned at birth and, although Élisa's first name came from her parents, the name Mercœur was given to her by a police commissioner in Nantes. Elisa's abandonment is recorded in the Nantes birth register, First Division, on 3 July 1809. Further research was carried out by the Franciscan Ubald d'Alençon (1872-1927) in 1925. An article by Paul Caillaud in the Annales de Bretagne journal (1952) gives a detailed account.

=== Abandoned at birth ===
As the couple were unable to afford to look after their baby, her mother abandoned Mercoeur when she was only three days old. On 27 June 1809 at 10pm, the baby was taken in at the door of the Nantes Orphans' Hospice (Hospice des Orphelins, Nantes), located in the Saint-Clément district near the lycée and La Bouteillerie Cemetery, by Jean Favret, an employee of the orphanage. The baby carried a piece of paper with these words:

"Élisa, born 24 June 1809, not registered in civil acts. Heaven and gentle humanity will watch over her. Her parents may be happy enough to claim her one day."

At 4 p.m. on 28 June, Jean Favret presented the baby to Police Commissioner Sébastien-Barthélemy Benoist, who was primarily responsible for orphans in the Lycée district, and who, in view of the information presented, gave her the name Élisa Mercœur. Mercœur was the name of a street in Nantes. The baby was then taken to the orphanage. On 21 April 1811, as she had wished, her mother, Adélaïde Aumand, took Élisa back from the orphanage; in the Memoirs, this event appears as "she was twenty-one months old when I was left alone to raise her". Adélaïde Aumand accepted the name given by Benoist.

== Early life ==
On 2 March 1825, Mercœur's father died, leaving the family essentially destitute. Adèle Aumand, who was now single, and her daughter were registered in 1818 and 1826, at the same address at 30 rue du Calvaire in Nantes. In 1818, they had two rooms for 40 francs in rent; in 1826, only one piece for 30 francs: the death of Jules-François Barré made their situation more precarious.

Mercœur certainly knew her father, as she wrote a poem about his death on 31 March 1825:

Du sommeil de la mort tout prêt à s'endormir…
Mon père retenait son âme délirante
Par les liens du souvenir.

Poised to fall into the sleep of death,
my father yet holds his delirious soul
by the ties of memory

== Child prodigy ==
Mercœur was only twenty-one months old when her mother remained alone to raise her, with more than limited resources. A friend of the family came to their aid and took care of the child's educational expenses. According to her mother, Mercœur was a little wonder. At six years old, she was already constructing subjects for tales and comedy. At eight, she wanted to compose a tragedy in five acts and in verse for the Comédie-Française. At twelve years old, Mercœur gave her young companions lessons in history, geography, writing, English and French. She also read Virgil openly and knew a little Greek and Italian.

The first time that Mercœur had the opportunity to reveal her literary talent to the public was the day of the debut, on the theatre of Nantes, of a famous singer. Élisa Mercœur wrote a piece of eighteen verses in one go and sent it to her address. The next day, the whole town applauded this poetic essay published by an unofficial friend in the newspaper Le Lycée Armoricain. At the age of sixteen, Mercœur who published a number of other poems, was quickly given the nickname the "Armorican Muse".

== Published poet ==
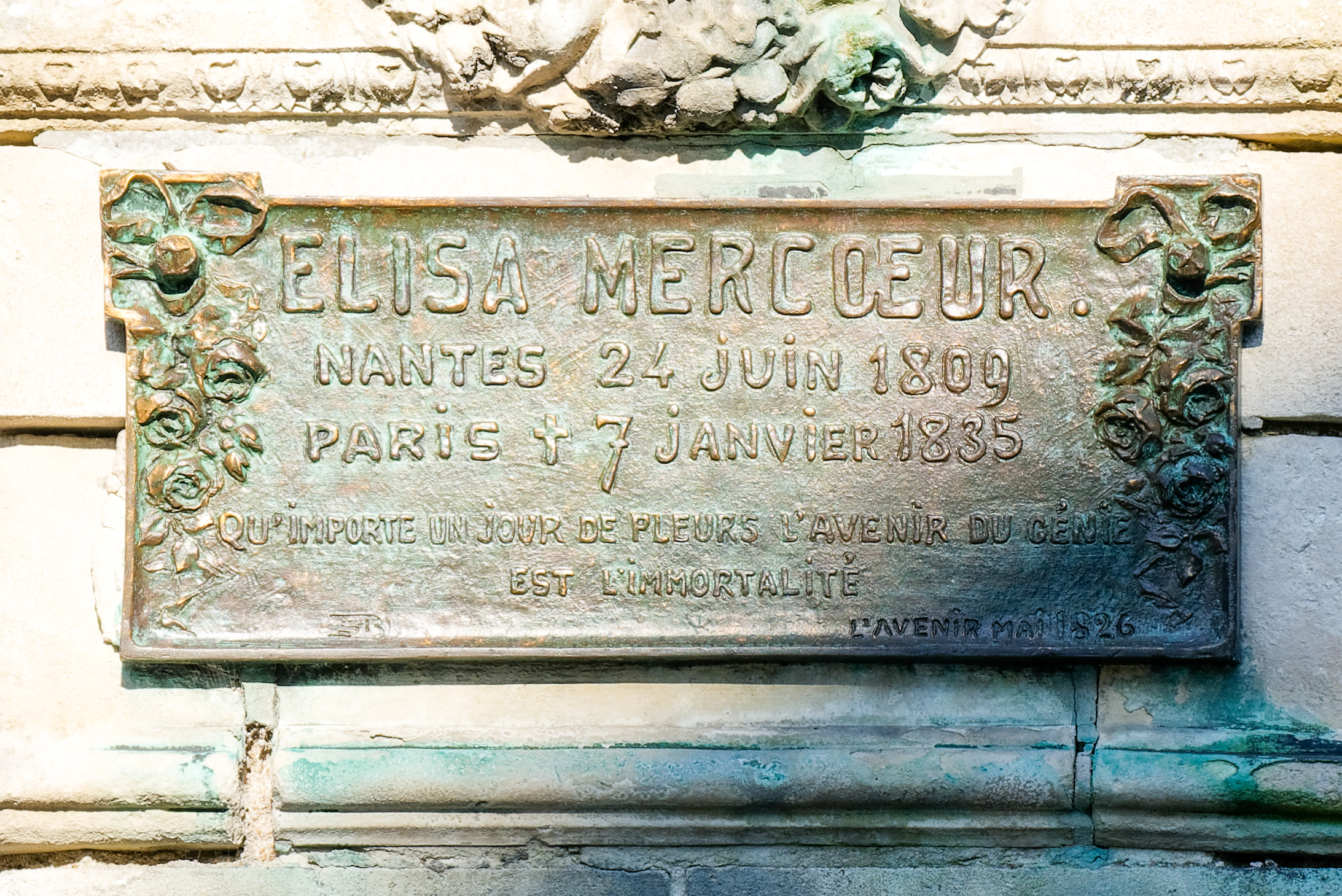
Plaque in homage to Elisa Mercœur at the entrance to the Nantes Art Museum

Mercœur, who was looking for recognition and encouraged by her friends, decided to approach a printer Mélinet-Malassis in Nantes in 1825. (Note: In the source text, Mercœur states she was 16 when the first verses were published and her mother states that it was 1827 when the first poems were published.) Camille Mélinet agreed to print her first poem "Dors, mon Ami" that would be part of the volume of verses "Poesies", in the "Journal de Nantes". Due to the quality of her work, Mélinet took an interest in Mercœur and offered her a contract to print further pieces on a monthly basis in the Lycée Armoricain, a newspaper that appeared between 1823 and 1831, and was distributed to cities all over France. Every month Mercœur would write a new poem to be published and once published, Mélinet would send her a copy of the newspaper, so Mercœur could read the letters and reviews.

At the end of 1825, Mélinet encouraged Mercœur to compete for the prizes being awarded by the Academic Society of Nantes and Loire-Atlantique in both the years of 1825 and 1826. The subjects were on the Lighthouse of the Plateau du Four for 1825 and the Combat of the Thirty for 1826. While Mercœur didn't win anything, her work did get an honourable mention.

After a year of publishing poems, Mercœur was so widely known that she was elected as a corresponding member to the Academy of Lyon in October 1826. The intellectual society, whose motto was "Union and tolerance" was chaired by François-René de Chateaubriand. In January 1827, Mercœur wrote the poem "La Pensée" specifically for the academy. The historian Alphonse Rastoul describes the "vague and dreamy" nature of Mercœur's work that compares favourably with the English poets of the time. Thanks to the encouragement that came from all quarters, Mercœur's reputation soon spread throughout France. The recognition that Mercœur for her work corpus resulted in her being elected first to Polymathic Society of Morbihan and then later in May 1927, to the Academic Society of Nantes and Loire-Atlantique. But all these successes, all these honours were not enough for Mercœur who, from 1827, seemed to focus on her verses complaining about her fate and regretting the alleged forgetfulness in which she was left. Nothing was more unfair than those complaints. Since the publication of her volume, the newspapers had surprised her with their praises, subscriptions abounded and high-ranking people, including the Marie-Caroline of Bourbon-Two Sicilies, Duchess of Berry, had sent her praises. However, with no income and no wish to work as an embroiderer, Mercœur sought other paid activity by placing an advert in the Journal de Nantes offering private lessons in English, French, geography and mythology as well as a translating from French to English.

In November 1826, Camile Mellinet created the "Le Breton" liberal newspaper. The paper encouraged women to take part in the arts and letters but not to meddle in philosophy and politics. It states:

"We believe that, in the order of creation, women have been destined for a nobler role and we will never complain that she is cultivated by the arts and letters. Let her exhibit at the salon, let her cheer on our theaters, let her thoughts be applauded. Women, teach us by enchanting consolations of the earth, celebrate your joys and loves, drag us into your sweet dreams"

Mercœur's sensuous emotive poetry follows this assumption. Described as an imitator of André Chénier, Alphonse de Lamartine and Marceline Desbordes-Valmore, she is capable of "looking out of time" with poems "The Song of the Scottish Bard" or "Childe-Harold, Imitation of Lord Byron". Whatever one thinks of the virginal composition that she eventually identifies as her own lyrical muse that is reflected in her mother's virginal characterisation after her death, in Mercœur's work it can be seen that she was at ease with the harmonious in accordance with contemporary tastes.

=== Elegies ===
In 1827, Mellinet offered Mercœur a contract for a collection of poetry which was produced in June 1827 with a printing of 2700 copies. The collection was dedicated to François-René de Chateaubriand. The first poem, titled À Chateaubriand (To Chateaubriand), was addressed to him, written as an invocation, the ending of which has the following: "I need, feeble child, someone watching over my cradle. And the eagle can, at least, in the shadow of its wing, protect the timid bird". The eagle replied to the shy bird, which he could not offer any shelter to anyone, in the form of a letter that was reproduced in the Nantes press on 18 July 1827. Ludovic Chapplain, a writer and publisher reviewed the collection in Lycée Armoricain. He stated the collection has the "soft and light chords" of the first works, but more expressiveness and "more male accents" later. He described Mercœur as a "women of letters" who has attained "a complete emancipation", and has succeeded in abolishing "the dividing line that had separated the sexes". Finally thus:

"She wants ... although she has the misfortune of being both a woman, a poet and a provincial woman, trying to make people forget these very serious wrongs in the eyes of Parisian readers, to get her compatriots to approve a collection of poetry; in a word, to obtain a literary success in her hometown".

On 21 July 1827 the "Breton" newspaper, created in November 1826 by Camile Mellinet stated of the appearance of the elegy:

"..."Mercœur is the only Breton woman who dared to call herself a poet in her own province and present herself with a volume by hand to the eyes of her stunned compatriots. A single female author with a small collection. It is not too much, especially when several hundred of his fellows can, in the capital, be impending poets, philosophers, learned, playwrights or simply making novels"

== Paris ==
After Mercœur's elegy was published, she was still without a regular income but still insisting that she wanted to live off of her poetry. In June 1828, Marie-Caroline of Bourbon-Two Sicilies, Duchess of Berry visited Nantes. Mercœur organised the festivities, wrote a poem for the Duchess and recited it in her presence while at the Grand Ball. However, she was sidelined for the next ceremony and didn't understand the reason why it happened as she didn't understand the current political situation in pre-revolutionary France.

While Mercœur was holding a poetry reading in the prefecture of Nantes one evening, thieves broke into her house and stole a sum of money, given to her by the Duchess of Berry. It caused some embarrassment and spooked her, leading her to believe that she had lost the affection of Nantes society. During the summer, Mercœur wrote to her friend and confident Evariste Boulay-Paty telling her that she planned to move to Paris. There were several reasons for the move. Her embarrassment at the loss of money, along with a marriage proposal from an older man, gave rise to the appearance of impropriety and rumours of immorality. Nevertheless, the proposal was rejected as Mercœur feared losing her independence. Mercœur was also encouraged by an invitation she received to publish poetry in the Paris-based Almanach des Muses poetry almanac. Combined the reasons reinforced her decision to leave Nantes. However, Camille Mélinet tried to warn her about life in Paris, believing she could prosper in Nantes and encouraged her to become a teacher, through which she could make a living but the warning fell on deaf ears. Moving to Paris was Mercœur's dream.

With the promise of work and financial support, she moved to Paris with her mother, at the end of October 1828. In January 1829, Mercœur received a bonus from the Ministry of the Interior and an annual pension of 300 francs, granted from the funds of the master's office of the Maison du Roi. This pension was increased almost immediately to 1,200 francs by M. de Martignac – a minister to whom she had sent a piece entitled "La Gloire" and had received a kind letter in return. In Paris, Élisa Mercœur became a regular in literary salons and attracted the praises of Alphonse de Lamartine, Alfred de Musset, Victor Hugo and Chateaubriand. She also became friends with Mélanie Waldor and Juliette Récamier.

In Paris, Mercœur came under the influence of Alexandre Soumet who convinced her to write a tragedy and dedicate herself to theatre instead of poetry. Mercœur attempted to write tragedy for theatre, publishing a "Boabdil" on 29 July 1829. The July Revolution of 1830 had a significant effect on both Mercœur and her mother. The pension from de Martignac ended, leaving them effectively destitute and by 1832, Mercœur and her mother were in dire straits. The lack of money forced Mercœur to write prose for the Journal des Demoiselles. Thanks to the largesse of Casimir Delavigne she received a new pension of 900 francs per year. Despite the many supporters she received, she was not satisfied. In a passage from her poems, she complains, among other things, that she was obliged to do 'this horrible trade of selling her prose and verse to booksellers at so much a sheet', and that she could not indulge in the selfless worship of poetry. Most of her biographers have echoed these complaints and pointed to this forced labour as the cause of Élisa Mercœur's death, but the memoirs left by her mother attest to the fact that they never had to endure any real misery, and it was neither work nor misery that led Élisa Mercœur to her grave. She herself admitted this, through her mother, and this testimony seems irrefutable.

On 3 May 1831 (Note: The reading of the play was delayed for 10 months due to the July Revolution) and thanks to her powerful patrons, Mercœur managed to get the play read before the committee of the Comédie-Française, in front of Claude Louis Séraphin Barizain, Jean-Bernard Brissebarre, Granville and Taylor. The next day, she learned that Boabdil was accepted by the actors, but rejected by Baron Taylor, who found the play very well done, but could not, he said, hope to attract the Parisian public and interest them in the story of a King of Granada.

The Paris Le Globe stated in their review of Mercœur's work:

"Mercœur must not misunderstand the nature of her talent; it is the talent of a young girl, gracious and pure, but without energy; her lyre does not want to be tense ... Let her think of the style, without which, poet or prosper, one never goes far; let her avoid the incorrection and prose lines that she too often lets drag herself next to her most beautiful verse . . . then Mle Mercœur will deserve some of the praise she has already received, and will take her place between the women-poets, below M lle Gay"

Mercœur was greatly affected by the rejection of her work in which she had placed all her hopes. From that day forward her strength waned and she ended up falling quite ill. Apart from the production of the few last poems dedicated to Louis Philippe I and his ministers, she stopped producing poetry entirely. Her many attempts to become a novelist largely failed, even though she was under contract to produce a novel. The book was to be titled "Quatre amours" ("Four loves") and had been announced in the Revue de Paris in February 1833, but she never managed to write. Becoming ever more aware of the gender-specific issues of her sex and the demands on her as a poet, she published a poem in the Journal des femmes where she attacked men who abuse women and are not sanctioned by society.

== Death ==
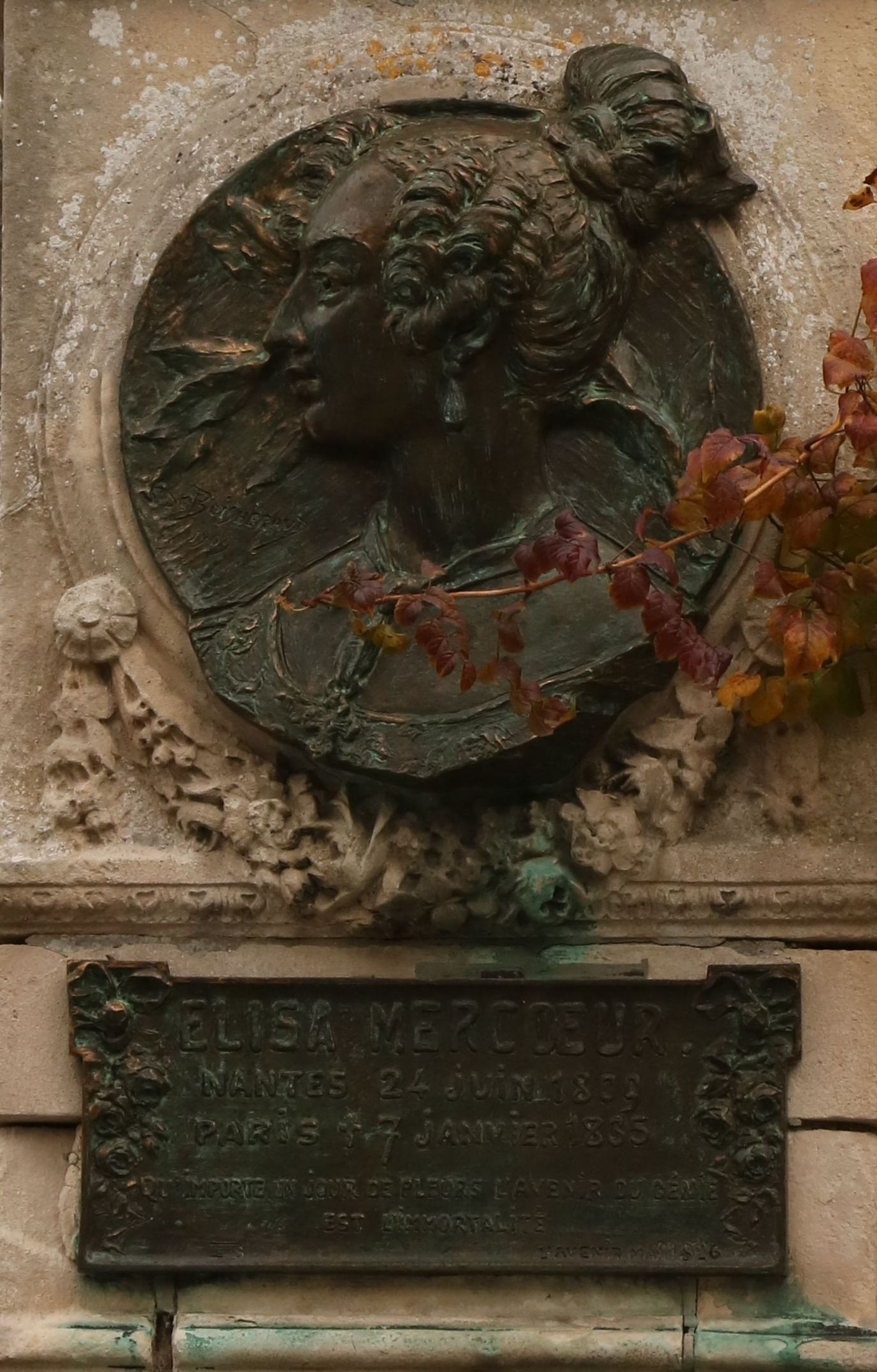
The Élisa Mercœur medallion, created by the sculptor Sébastien de Boishéraud in 1909 and placed in the Jardin des plantes botanical garden in Nantes

Affected by a lung condition that developed into tuberculosis, the doctor had to prescribe a season in the countryside. She settled for Mareil-sur-Mauldre, a place she knew well. The poet Pierre-Jean de Béranger came to visit her there. While there she tried to kill herself. The old priest of the village, whom she saw frequently, took her confession and granted her the Holy Sacraments. Shortly after her return to Paris, she died in the arms of her mother, to whom she had said a few days before: "If God calls me to him, a thousand tales will be told about my death; some will say that I died of misery; love others! Tell those who tell you that Mr. Taylor's refusal to play my tragedy alone caused the poor child to die!"

Her funeral in the Père-Lachaise cemetery was attended by Chateaubriand and Pierre-Simon Ballanche. Other female poets, Victoire Babois, Anne-Marie de Beaufort d'Hautpoul, Anaïs Ségalas, Amable Tastu, Sophie Ulliac-Trémadeure and Mélanie Waldor attended in mourning. She is buried in the 17th division.

== Analysis ==
Mercœur was recognised as a talented poet during her lifetime. She represented herself as a genius within the meaning of her poetry and the feminine persona, qualities inherent in Romanticism that she invoked in her poetry. (Note: Wendy N. Greenberg goes into considerable detail in her essay where she analyses many of Mercœur's poems.) The representation of genius during her life was limited to the male personality and was particularly harmful to women who were generally excluded from male-dominated society. Women were thought to have feelings while men had thoughts. Through her genius, Mercœur exhibited these "feminine" qualities, for example flight of fancy and the denigration of clarity. While Mercoeur was self-centered in her poetry, other Romantic writers like Alfred de Vigny were self-effacing. Mercoeur wrote many poems to great men and ultimately, Mercoeur's self-promotion was a way to establish a legacy and acquire the power and virility associated with male figures in history. Another aspect of her genius was one of illness, a theme in Mercœur poetry that was used to reinforce her self-portrayal as a tortured and sensitive genius whose writings came at great personal cost.

She also wrote texts on literary criticism. She argued that women are just as capable as men of producing great literature. She also criticizes male authors for their portrayals of women, which she argues are often stereotypical and limiting. Mercoeur's literary criticism is notable not only for its feminist perspective, but also for its focus on the social and political context in which literature is produced and consumed. In summary, Mercoeur's concept of genius is related to the idea of spiritual advancement or progress, and she sees herself as part of a universal picture of heroes and poets who have led humanity forward. This is subversive because she was a woman trying to overstep the bounds of feminine literature and constantly being judged by committees of men. Despite the rejection she faced, Mercoeur was a masochist and yearned for acceptance from the elite male club of the literary establishment.

== Published work ==
The complete works of Élisa Mercœur were published by her mother under this general title: "Œuvres complètes de Mlle Élisa Mercœur, précédées de Mémoires et notices sur la vie de l'auteur, écrites par sa mère"6 . In addition to her poetry, these volumes contain: Boabdil, a tragedy in five acts; Louis XI et le Bénédictin, a fifteenth-century chronicle; les Italiennes; les Quatre amours; Louis XIII, and some other novels and short stories.

- Élisa Mercœur; Adélaïde Aumond Mercœur; Achille Devéria; François-René de Chateaubriand (1843). Oeuvres complètes d'Elisa Mercoeur de Nantes. T. 1 / précédées de mémoires et notices sur la vie de l'auteur, écrits par sa mère ; ornées d'un très beau portrait, par A. Deveria, et de trois fac-simile, dont l'un d'Élisa Mercoeur, et les deux autres de MM. de Chateaubriand et de Martignac [Complete works of Elisa Mercoeur de Nantes. T. 1 / preceded by memoirs and notes on the author's life, written by her mother; decorated with a beautiful portrait, by A. Deveria, and three facsimiles, one of which is by Elisa Mercoeur, and the other two by MM. de Chateaubriand and de Martignac] (in French). Paris. OCLC 1254585341. Vol. 2 OCLC 1254585716. Vol. 3 OCLC 1254585715

== Awards and honours ==
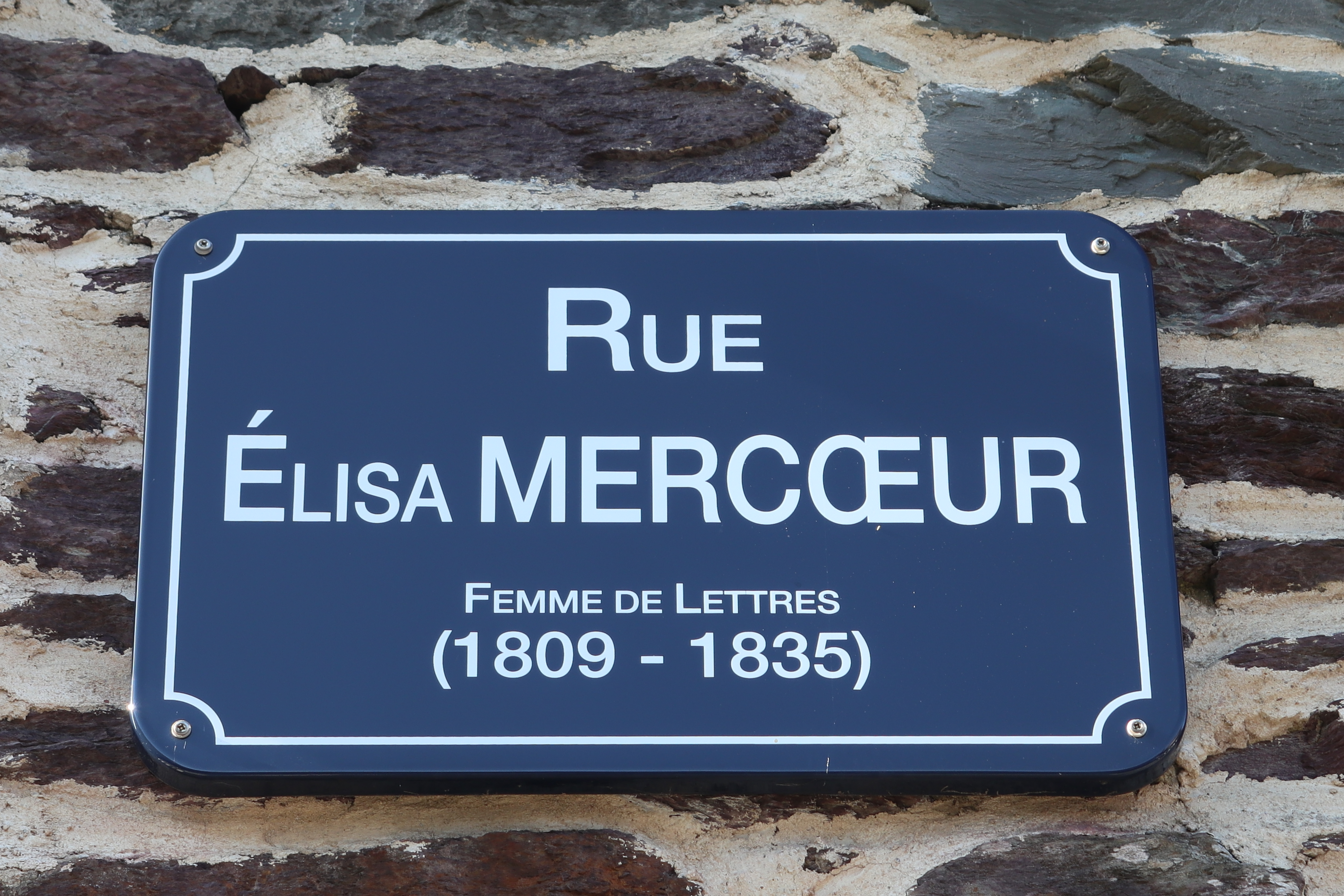
Street sign in Rennes

There are streets called Rue Élisa Mercœur that are named in honour of Mercœur in Rennes, Vertou, Saint-Sébastien-sur-Loire. The street named Rue Élisa Mercœur in Nantes does not refer to this Mercœur but to the Philippe Emmanuel, Duke of Mercœur, the ultra-Catholic governor of the city from 1582 to 1598, at the end of the French Wars of Religion. There is an avenue named Avenue Élisa Mercœur in Champigny-sur-Marne and a square, Square Élisa-Mercœur in Nantes. Lastly there is a small dead-end street in Séné called the Allée Élisa Mercœur.

== Bibliography ==
=== Books ===
- Mercoeur, Élisa (1829). Poésies de Mlle Élisa Mercoeur (de Nantes). 2e édition augmentée de nouvelles pièces [Poetry of Mlle Elisa Mercoeur (of Nantes). 2nd edition] (in French) (2nd ed.). Paris: Crapelet. OCLC 461366497.
- Mercoeur, Élisa (1827). Poésies de Mlle Élisa Mercoeur (in French). Nantes: Impr. de Mellinet-Malassi. OCLC 457686917.
- Mercœur, Élisa (1827). Bisson (in French). Nantes: Impr. de Mellinet-Malassis. OCLC 457686908.
- Mercoeur, Élisa. La comtesse de Villequier (in French). OCLC 459484526.
- Mercœur, Élisa (1833). "La dernière feuille". In Hugo, Abel (ed.). Le conteur (in French). Paris: M. A. Hugo.
- Soumet, Gabrielle (1834). Le livre rose: Récits et causeries de jeunes femmes. Tome troisième. La cloche de Saint-Bruno, chapitre deuxième d'un ouvrage inédit (in French). Paris: U. Canel. OCLC 459363374.

=== Musical compositions ===
- Kaiser, Kaiser (1923). "Rêverie, mélodie. Poésie de Elisa Mercoeur, soprano. Chant et piano" (sheet music). Paris: Maurice Senart.
- Paturel, Eugène. "La feuille flétrie / paroles de Mademoiselle Elisa Mercoeur ; mise en musique... par Eugène Paturel" (sheet music). Lyon: Chez Rousset.
- Paul-Emile, Berchon (1854). "Le Jeune mendiant. Mélodie. Paroles d' Elisa Mercoeur" (sheet music). Paris: L. Mayaud et Ci.

=== Biography ===
- Daniel, Geoffroy (1 January 1990). ELISA MERCOEUR Nantaise Romantique (in French). Maulévrier: Hérault éditions.
