= La Bouteillerie Cemetery =

Cemetery in Nantes, France

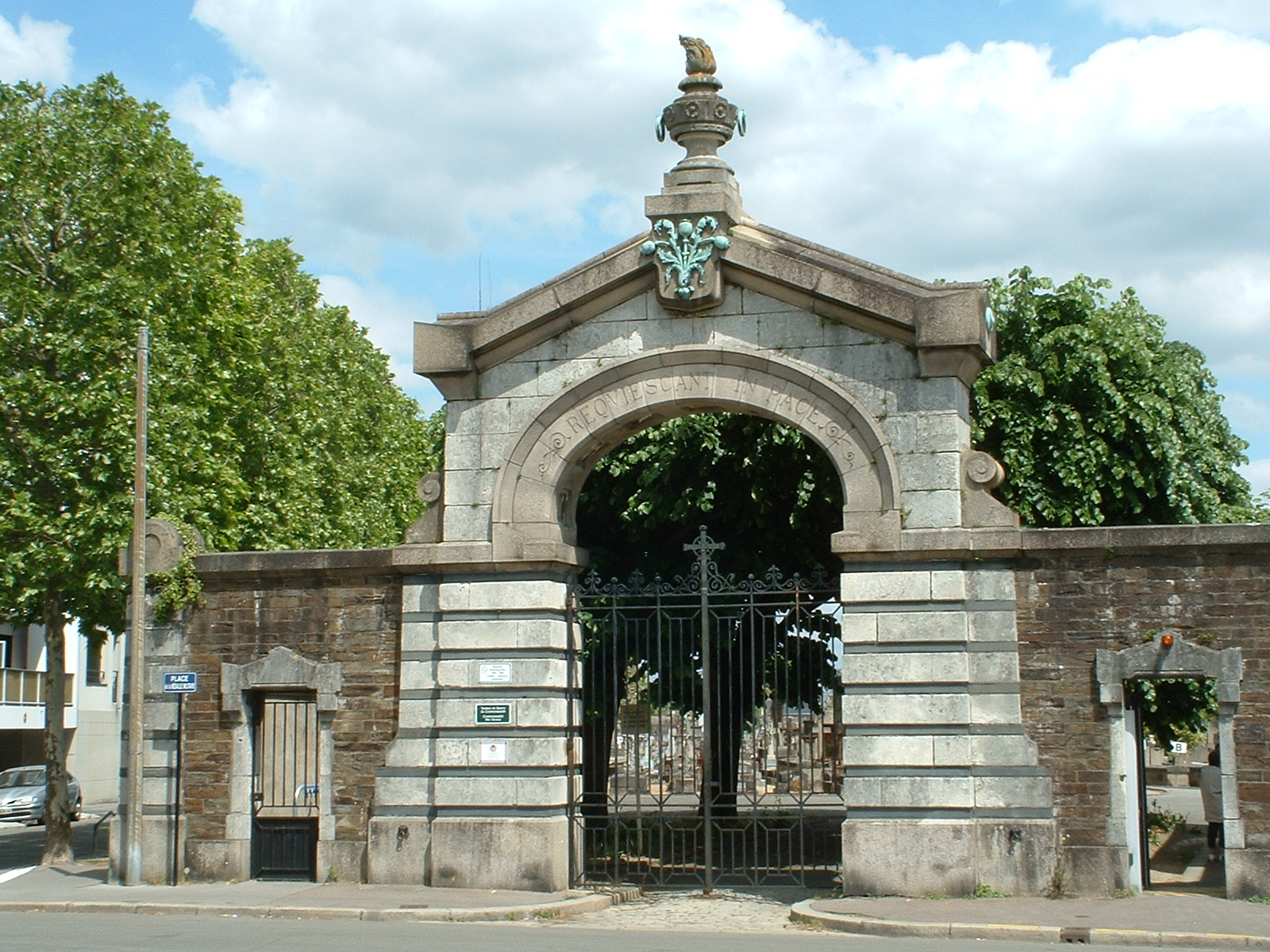
- West entrance to La Bouteillerie cemetery on Place de la Médaille-Militaire
- Interactive map of La Bouteillerie Cemetery

Details
- Established: 1774
- Location: Nantes, Loire-Atlantique
- Country: France
- Coordinates: 47°13′19″N 1°32′24″W

The La Bouteillerie Cemetery is a burial site situated in Nantes, France, within the Malakoff-Saint-Donatien neighborhood. The cemetery has been in use since 1774.

== Description ==
La Bouteillerie Cemetery is situated approximately 700 meters east of the cathedral. The cemetery is bordered to the north by Rue Gambetta and to the west by Rue Frédéric-Cailliaud, which separates it from the Jardin des plantes. To the east, the cemetery is bordered by private properties along Rue Coulmiers. To the south, the site is also bordered by private properties and dead-end private roads perpendicular to the cemetery's surrounding wall and lead to Rue d'Allonville.

Two points of access serve to facilitate ingress to La Bouteillerie. The primary entrance is in the northwest quadrant, at the intersection of Place de la Médaille Militaire, Gambetta Street, and Frédéric-Cailliaud Street. An alternative entry is located at the northeast corner of the site, on Gambetta Street.

In general, the cemetery is rectangular, measuring approximately 400 meters in length and 170 meters in width. Its orientation is west-southwest to east-northeast.

== History ==
=== Origins ===
A geological study conducted before the acquisition of land in 1929 determined that the soil of La Bouteillerie consists of ancient alluvium from the Loire, designated as "Medium Terraces", comprising sandy clay with layers of sand, gravel, and rolled pebbles. The toponym is derived from the site's historical usage during the Middle Ages when the Bishop of Nantes owned it. The prelate maintained Vineyards and wine cellars on the property. The wine was bottled on the premises, which is the reason why the estate is known as "La Bouteillerie." It was sold by Bishop Daniel Vigier in 1320, then passed to the family of the Marquise de Sévigny in 1523, Christophe Vavasseur in 1554, and subsequently to the Coutances family. The Carthusians acquired it in the 17th century.

In 1774, the property was purchased by the parishes of Saint-Clément, Sainte-Croix, Saint-Denis, Saint-Laurent, Saint-Léonard, Sainte-Radegonde, Saint-Vincent, and the collegiate church of Notre-Dame, acting on the orders of the King's Council of State under Louis XVI, to establish a shared cemetery for the aforementioned parishes.

On 10 March 1776, a Royal Declaration was enacted that regulated the burials' practice within churches. Although not prohibited, the new conditions effectively reserved them for a minority of privileged individuals. Two years before this decree, the city of Nantes made a forward-thinking decision to purchase the La Bouteillerie estate and construct a cemetery on the property. The cemetery was blessed on 25 October 1774, and the first burial, that of René Jannequin, a boy of approximately thirteen years of age, took place on the same day. The second recorded burial was that of Guillaume Grou, a Nantes-based shipowner. Grou had expressed a final wish to be buried in Saint-Clément Church, but the new rules regarding the prohibition of burials in religious buildings thwarted this desire.

The cemetery located opposite Saint-Clément Church has been in use since at least the 15th century and was intended for Catholic families residing in the parish. An oratory, the Champ-Fleuri Chapel, had been constructed on the site. When the La Bouteillerie Cemetery was established, the cemetery and chapel were abandoned, and the entrance gate of the Champ-Fleuri Cemetery was relocated to the new site. This gate was surmounted by a sculpture representing a ship: a brigantine carved in stone. The cemetery was originally named Le Grand brigandin. The gate has since been lost to history, and the name "La Bouteillerie" has replaced it.

=== Development ===
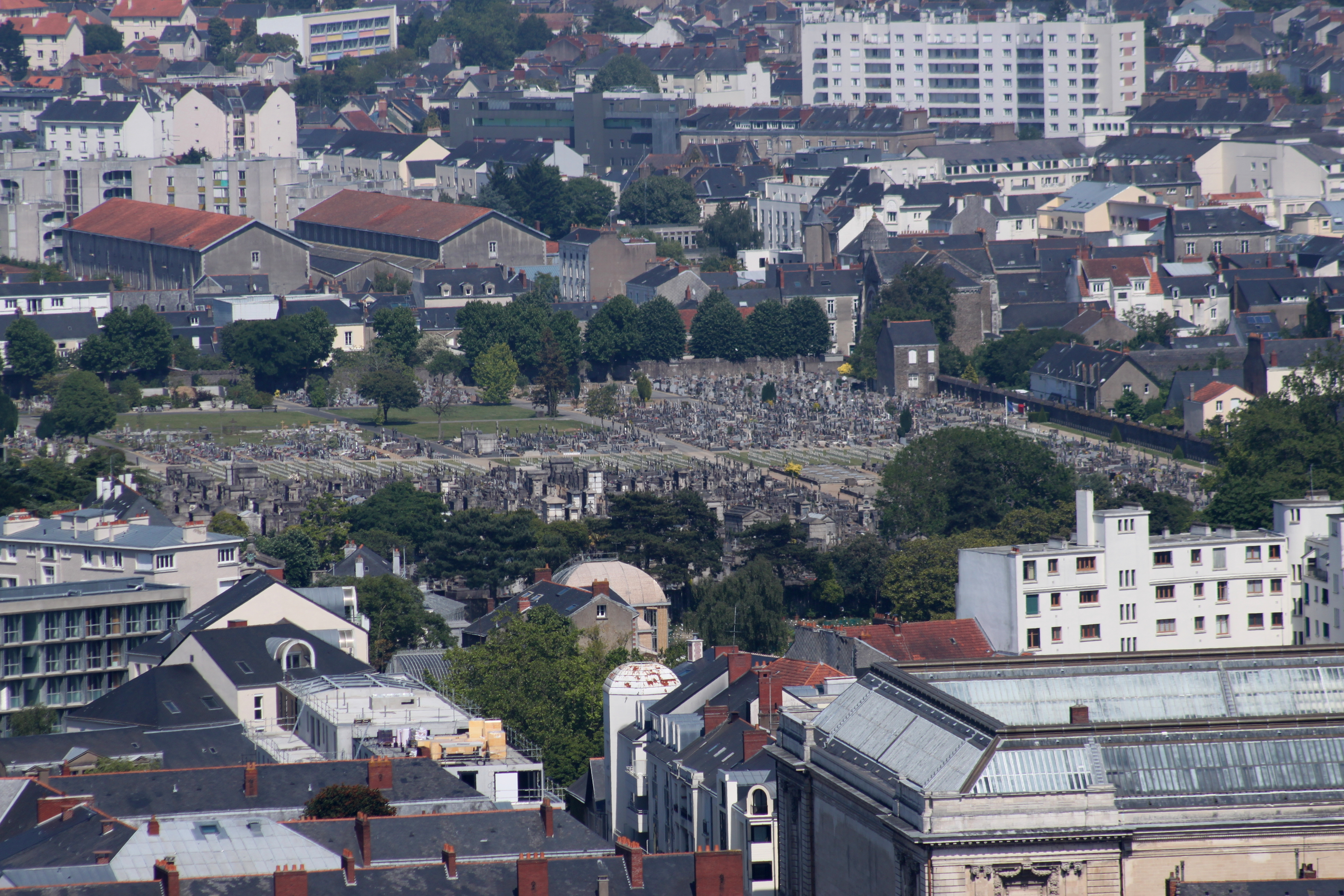
View from the Brittany Tower.

In 1809, a study was conducted to ascertain the sufficiency of the 10,500 m^{2} of cemetery space used by the three parishes. The findings indicated that the area was adequate to meet the burial needs of the parishes over several decades. However, by 1832, the situation had changed. The city was once again lamenting the usual cases of insufficient space. To bury new deceased individuals, plots were reused before the bodies had fully decomposed. A land exchange enabled the municipality to augment the area of La Bouteillerie by 65 acres. In 1890, the municipality acquired an additional 15,000 m^{2}, with Mayor Ernest Guibourd de Luzinais forecasting that this expansion would be the final one, as it would be adequate "for this part of the city." However, in 1898, Nantes augmented the cemetery by 6,700 m^{2} to accommodate prospective growth.

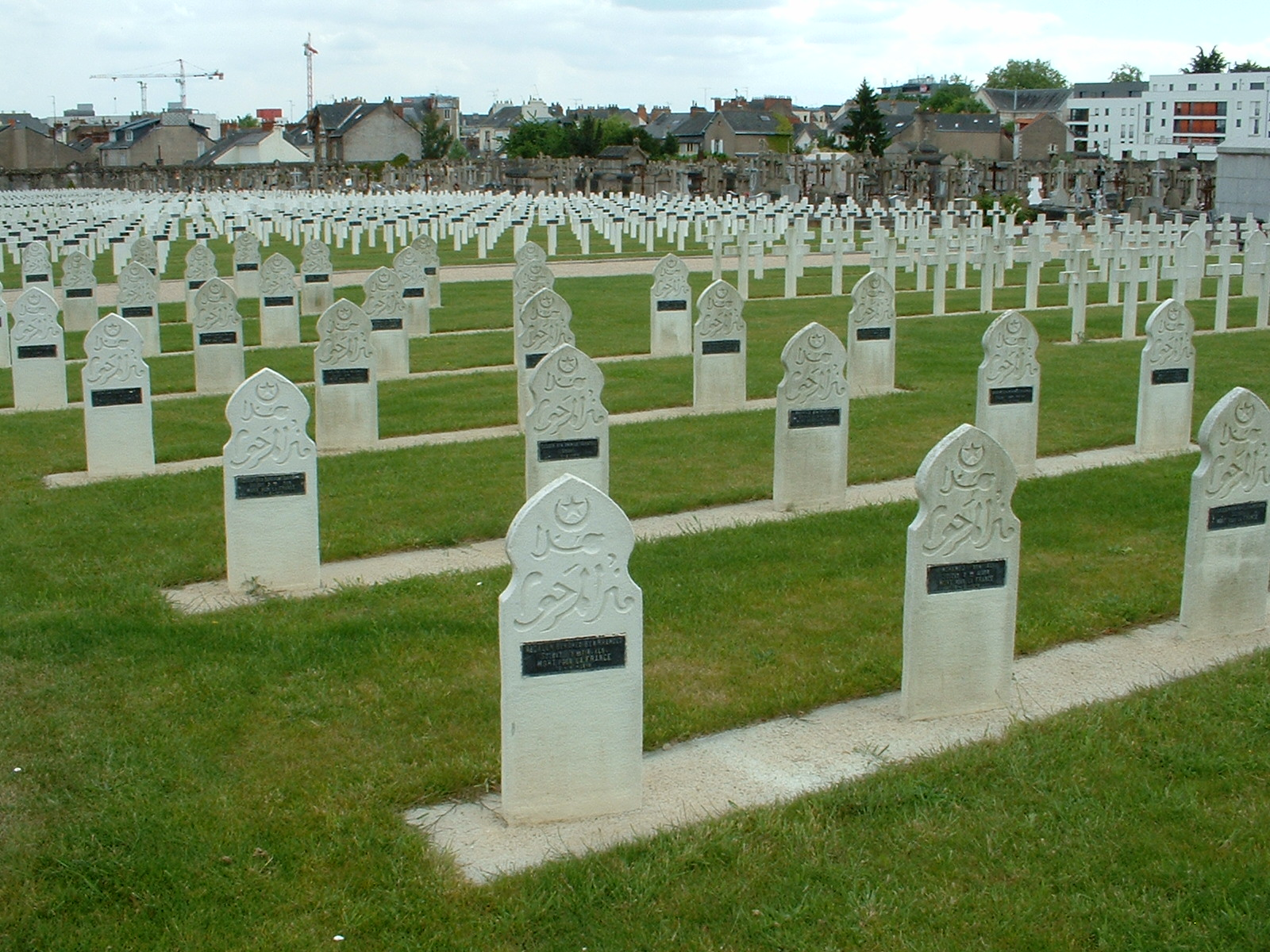
Bouteillerie military cemetery.

The history of La Bouteillerie is marked by changes to its structural configuration. On 30 October 1914, the administrative authorities inaugurated a section for the internment of military personnel who had perished. In the period between that date and 1919, all those who died in military hospitals established in Nantes during World War I were required to be buried. In 1918, 2,500 m^{2} of La Bouteillerie were allocated for the establishment of a military cemetery, which saw the creation of 1,533 graves. Only 560 were granted the "Died for France" mention, and the state provided compensation for 620 graves. At the beginning of the 21st century, 1,781 military personnel from England, Belgium, Russia, Poland, Germany, and France, as well as combatants from French colonies (Algerians, Senegalese, or individuals with Asian surnames), were interred in this section. To compensate for the space used, the municipality procured 7,739 m^{2} of adjacent land, a portion of which was designated for the cemetery, which now encompasses an area of approximately 6 hectares. In 2008, on the 90th anniversary of the 1918 Armistice, the military section underwent renovation by a team of ten individuals as part of a reintegration initiative.

The Saint-Philibert excursion steamboat, which operated the route from Noirmoutier Island to the mainland, met its demise in 1931. This tragedy resulted in the deaths of nearly 500 individuals. When it was determined that 54 of the recovered bodies lacked relatives or family members to provide them with a burial, the city of Nantes elected to offer them solemn funerals and inter them in La Bouteillerie. They were subsequently transferred to Saint-Jacques Cemetery a few years later.

== Notable or remarkable burials ==
One tomb in the La Bouteillerie Cemetery bears the epitaph: "Here lies the body of Lady Escher, born Charlotte Melcion d'Arc. March 6, 1810, September 18, 1875. A De Profundis. CAP 13865." Some scholars posit that she was a descendant of Jacquemin of Arc, the elder brother of Joan of Arc.

Among the graves of notable personalities are: Ange Guépin, René Guy Cadou, Camille Mellinet, Marie Alphonse Bedeau, Évariste Colombel, Georges-Évariste Colombel, Serge Danot, Augustin Darbefeuille, César Jules Decré, Hippolyte Dubois, Théodore Auguste Dubigeon, Jules Grandjouan, Léa Papin, Armel de Wismes, Henry Wilfrid Deville, Émile Dezaunay, Léon Maître, André Lebois, Guillaume Grou and his wife Anne O'Shiell, Mathurine Fourchon, the Cassegrain family, and the Sourdille family.

Moreover, the cemetery's reception offers visitors the opportunity to embark on a guided tour, which allows them to gain insight into the lives and contributions of these renowned individuals.

== Statuary ==
In 1839, Charles-Mathurin d'Haveloose, a Nantes merchant born in Angers, bequeathed a large sum of money to the city of Nantes. To honor his memory, the city's architect, Henri-Théodore Driollet, created a monument, the Haveloose Stele, on which is inscribed: "To Haveloose, benefactor of the poor, benevolence and charity pay homage". This work is located near the concierge's office of the cemetery.

To the left of the historic entrance to the cemetery, a bas-relief entitled Vers l'infini (Towards infinity), a work by Blanche Moria, has been on display since 1928.

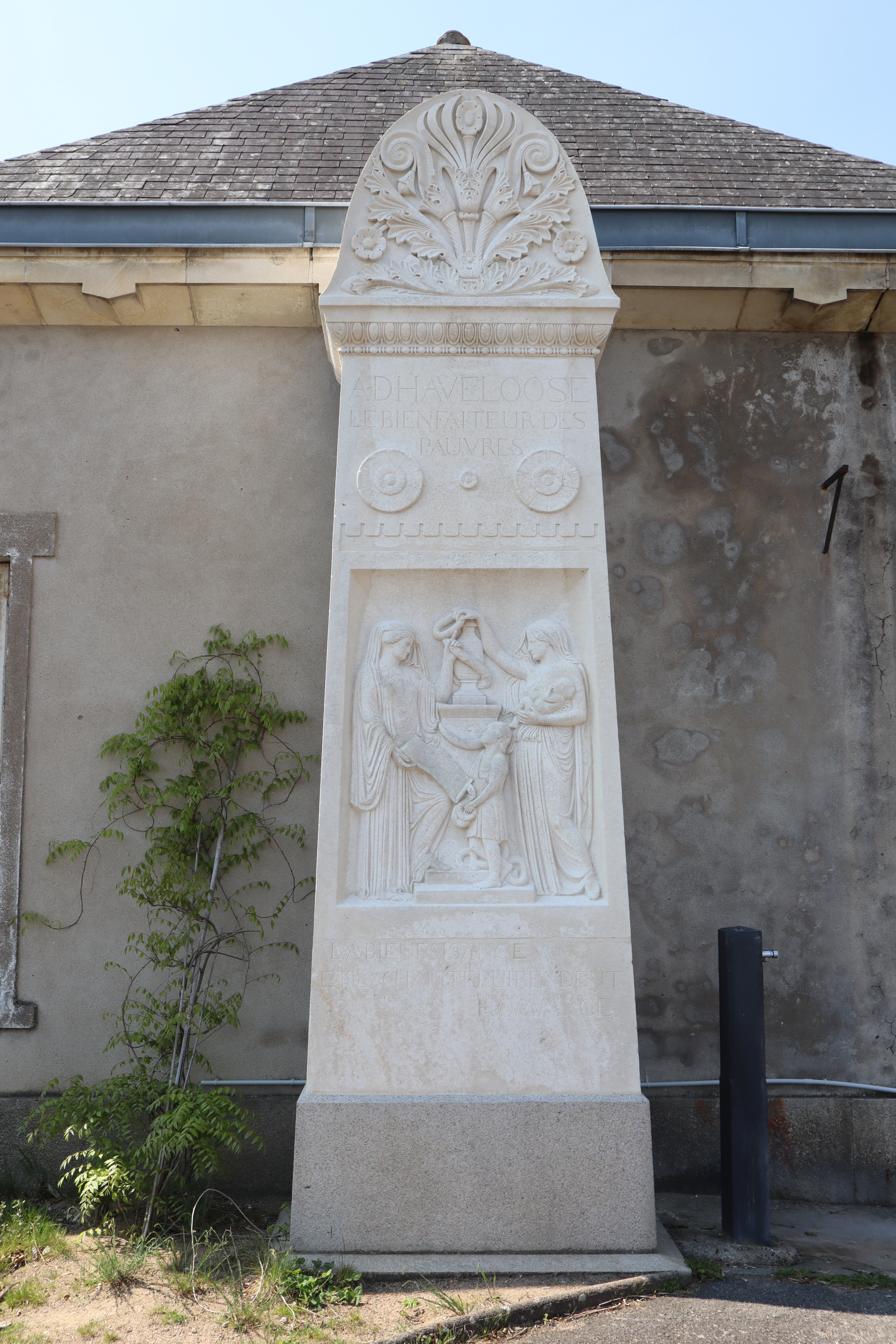
Haveloose stele.

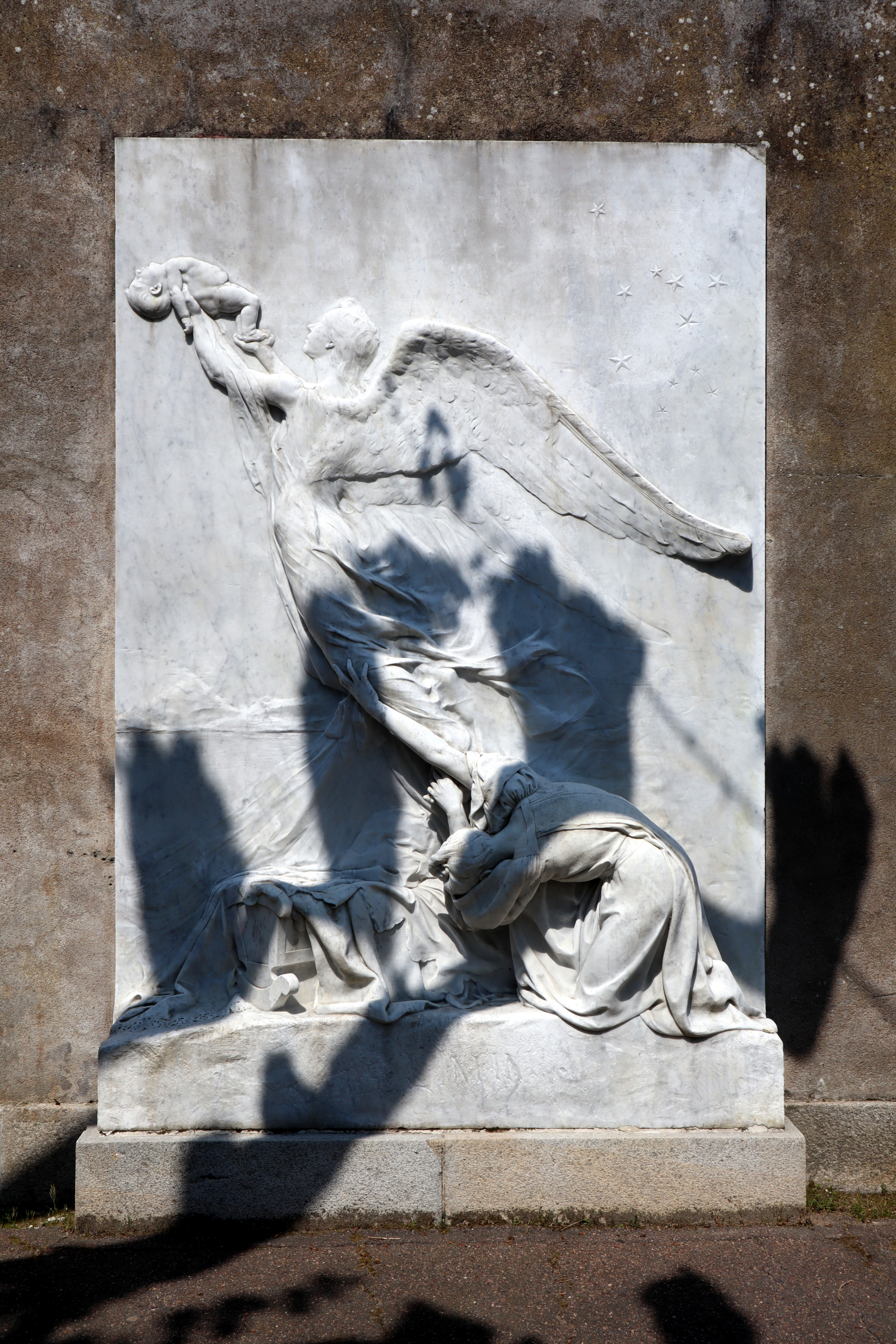
Vers l'infini.

== Filming ==
In October 2014, the cemetery was used as a filming location for the television movie Meurtres à Guérande from the series Murders in..., although the action is supposed to take place in the cemetery of Bayonne.

== See also ==
- Cemeteries of Nantes
- Cemetery Miséricorde

== Bibliography ==
=== Books used in writing the article ===
- Flohic, Jean-Luc (1999). Le Patrimoine des communes de la Loire-Atlantique. Le patrimoine des communes de France (in French). Vol. 2. Charenton-le-Pont: Flohic éditions. ISBN 2-84234-040-X.
- Kahn, Claude; Landais, Jean (1990). Des Lieux de mémoire : les quinze cimetières de Nantes (in French). Nantes: Ouest éditions et Université inter-âges de Nantes. ISBN 978-2-908261-01-1. LCCN 92161105.
- Lassère, Madeleine (1994). Les cimetières de Nantes au XIXe siècle. Les annales de Bretagne et des pays de l'Ouest (in French). Vol. 101. Rennes: Université de Haute-Bretagne. pp. 139–160. doi:10.3406/abpo.1994.3535. ISSN 2108-6443.
- Lhommeau, Éric; Roberts, Karen (2009). Guide du cimetière de la Bouteillerie Nantes (in French). Nantes: Le Veilleur de nuit. ISBN 978-2-9528652-5-8.
- Lhommeau, Éric; Roberts, Karen (2013). Les Artistes dans les cimetières nantais (in French). Nantes: Le Veilleur de nuit. ISBN 979-10-90603-03-5.

=== Other books ===
- Lelièvre, Pierre (1988). Nantes au XVIIIe siècle : urbanisme et architecture (in French). Paris: Éditions Picard. ISBN 978-2-7084-0351-2.
- de Wismes, Gaëtan (1898). Les Personnages sculptés des monuments religieux et civils, des rues, places, promenades et cimetières de la ville de Nantes : du petit nombre de ceux qui existent, de quelle manière on devrait l'accroître (in French). Vannes: Lafoly.
