= Irish of Nantes =

The expression Irish of Nantes (French: Irlandais de Nantes; Irish: Gaeil Nantes) denotes a community formed in the 17th century and of great importance in the 18th century. It was originally composed of Jacobite political refugees from Ireland fleeing the Glorious Revolution of 1688. This community eventually extended to the ports of Bordeaux and La Rochelle as well as to the French colony of Saint-Domingue (modern Haiti).

== Origins ==
The refugees were largely aristocrats, no longer able to bear arms or command troops. They threw themselves instead into colonial trade, creating numerous trading companies, among them those leading in the Transatlantic slave trade. They also integrated themselves fully into the city of Nantes, marrying the daughters of the local nobility. In Ireland these refugees in France were known as Wild Geese by their detractors.

Nantes was the foremost port for the Irish trading fleet. Out of sixty Jacobite company headquarters and trading houses in Europe in the mid-18th century, two thirds were based in four ports: 12 in Nantes, 9 in Bordeaux, 8 in Cádiz and a dozen in Stockholm and Gothenburg (although these were essentially branch offices).

The community also included a large number of priests. Bishop Robert Barry of Cork, Bishop Cornelius O’Keefe of Limerick and Bishop Patrick Comerford of Waterford all lived in Nantes. In 1695, the Bishop of Nantes gave them the use of his residence during the summer, the manoir de la Touche, which was to become a seminary for Irish priests, active until the French Revolution.

Lastly, there were Irish people of more modest rank or means, who generally took on occupations relating to maritime commerce – captains, pilots, coopers and porters.

== Development of the community ==
The standing of the Irish in Nantes grew steadily, if we observe the course of events across three generations. The first generation, of Nicolas Luker, Paul Sarsfield, André Geraldin and Nicolas Lée, emigrated to France in the middle of the 17th century, after the Irish Rebellion of 1641. They were joined later on by other Irish refugees following the Glorious Revolution of 1688 and the Treaty of Limerick in 1691. This wave of emigres was not confined to Nantes. The historian Gabriel Audisio notes the presence of Irish Catholic soldiers in the armies of the Duke of Savoy and of the Marquis of Pianezza, which took part in the bloody repression of the Waldensians during the Piedmont Easter.

The second generation included Luc O'Shiell, the pirate Phillip Walsh, based in Saint-Malo, and Jean Stapleton, with his associate Jacques Rulidge. They were welcomed with open arms by a country in the midst of the War of the League of Augsburg and Louis XIV welcomed several thousand Irish exiles at the Jacobite court of Saint-Germain-en-Laye. He made the Irish the spearhead of his army, and above all of his navy, particularly during the Jamaica Expedition of 1694. On 8 June 1694, Irish ships formed the bulk of a fleet of 22 vessels and 1,500 men which left Nantes under Admiral Jean-Baptiste du Casse, heading for Jamaica. They burned hundreds of houses and seized 1,300 slaves, whom they took to Saint-Domingue. They did not however attempt to seize the island of Jamaica as they judged this too difficult.

The third generation included the wives and daughters of Luc O'Shiell, Antoine Walsh, Jean Stapleton Junior and Jean-Baptiste MacNemara. They had considerable fortunes, which they invested in property while plotting to overthrow the British government.

The Irish expatriate community was also notable at Bordeaux, where, from 1715, it developed an important trade in salted beef with Ireland, which was used in supplying merchant fleets and overseas colonies.

== Significant figures ==
- Nicolas Lée was the first to settle in Nantes in 1649
- Paul Sarsfield settled in France in 1658 and Louis XIV granted him French nationality in 1678. His son Patrick Sarsfield served in the king's army 1671–1678 and again 1691–1693, commanding the Irish Brigade after the Treaty of Limerick.
- Jean Stapleton Senior founded a dynasty of Nantais shipowners. He owned plantations in Saint-Domingue as well as running a business in the Atlantic slave trade.
- Antoine Walsh, the most important trader in 18th century Nantes, founder of the Angola Company in 1748.
- The Butler family of shipowners, whose name was gallicised as 'Bouteiller', were major importers in Nantes
- Agnès O'Shiell, daughter of Luc O'Shiell one of the richest traders in Nantes, who were also property owners in Saint-Domingue
- Anne O'Shiell, manager of one of the biggest slave trading firms in the Nantes slave trade
- At La Rochelle, Denis Mac Carthy was an important trader
- Victor Martin O'Gorman was elected député from Saint-Domingue. The O'Gorman family owned two plantations at Cul-de-sac.
- A member of the Sutton de Clonard family took part in the La Pérouse Expedition
- The O'Riordan family, originally from Cork and Limerick, were important traders and shipowners in 18th century Nantes.

== See also ==
- Role of Nantes in the slave trade

=== Bibliography ===
- Alain Croix dir., Nantais venus d'ailleurs, Histoire des étrangers à Nantes des origines à nos jours, Nantes-Histoire/Presses universitaires de Rennes, 2007, pages 30–36.
- Joe O'Shea, 'Murder, Mutiny & Mayhem: The Blackest-Hearted Villains from Irish History, O'Brien Press, 2012 ISBN 9781847172990

=== External links (in French) ===
- Les réfugiés jacobites dans la France du 18ième siècle De Patrick Clarke de Dromantin
- Liste des négociants jacobites dans les ports européens au milieu du 18ième siècle
- Les réseaux commerciaux des irlandais de Nantes souis Louis XIV
