= Paul Marmy =

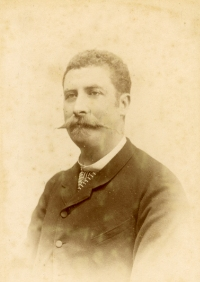
Paul Marmy in 1886

Paul Marmy (1851–1897) was director of the Jardin des Plantes de Nantes around 1890. The lilac Syringa vulgaris macrostachya carnea was named on Marny's advice.
