= Mathurine Fourchon =

Breton soldier

Mathurine Fourchon was born in 1786 in Gausson in the Province of Brittany in what is today the Côtes-d'Armor department in northwestern France. She is a Breton soldier. She is the seventh woman to be decorated with the Legion of Honor.

== Biography ==
Mathurine Fourchon behaved heroically during the Siege of Constantine, in Algeria, in October 1837. She treated the wounded there. She was wounded in turn by four bullets.

In 1853, under Napoleon III, Mathurine Fourchon was decorated with the Imperial Order of the Legion of Honor in recognition of her devotion.

After her military career, Mathurine Fourchon settled in Saint-Malo before retiring to Nantes. She died there on April 9, 1863, in poverty. The Nantes city council paid for her funeral expenses.

She is buried in La Bouteillerie Cemetery in Nantes.

Her Legion of Honor arouses protests.

== Honours ==
- knight of the Legion of Honour

== Gallery ==
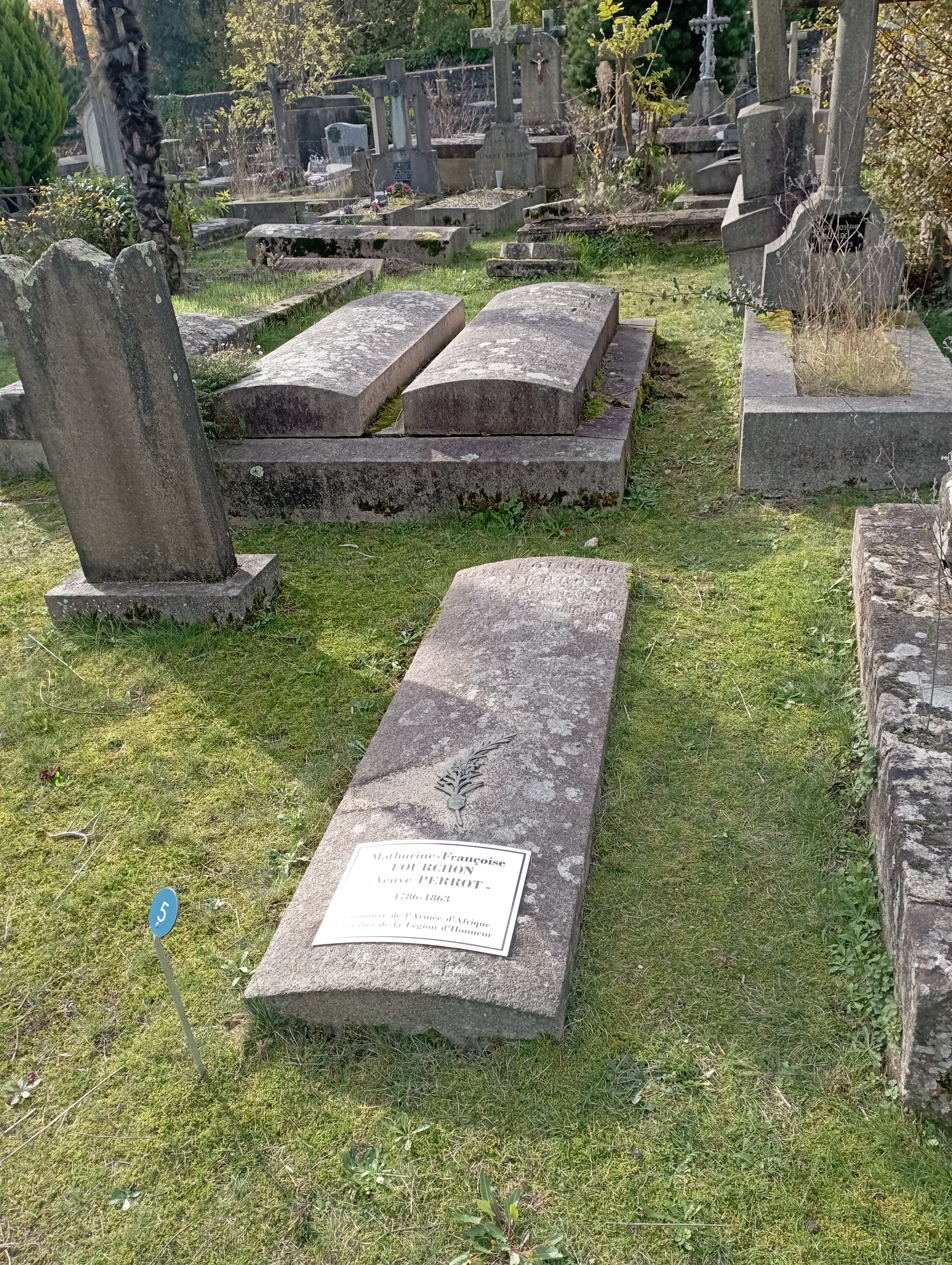
