= Mary O'Shiell =

French shipowner and slave trader

Mary O'Shiell (1715 – d. after 1745), was a French shipowner and slave trader. She is a known figure in the history of Nantes, alongside her sisters Agnés O'Shiell and Anne O'Shiell.

== Life ==
She was the daughter of the Irish Jacobite Luke O'Shiell (1677-1745), who was born in Dublin but emigrated to Nantes after the Irish defeat, and Agnès Vanasse (1690-1724). The family manor of the O'Shiell, Manoir de la Placelière, became the gathering place of the large Irish colony in Nantes. She married Antoine Walsh, a leading slave trader in the slave trade of Nantes. In 1755, the O'Shiell family became ennobled.
