= Antoine Walsh =

French merchant, ship owner and slave trader

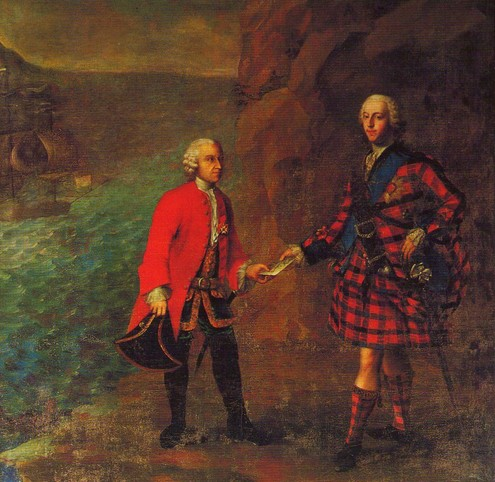
- Walsh (left) with Charles Edward Stuart at the Sound of Arisaig in Scotland
- Born: 22 January 1703; Saint Malo, France
- Died: 2 March 1763 (aged 60); Cap-Français, Saint-Domingue
- Occupations: Merchant, ship owner and slave trader
- Known for: Supporting Charles Edward Stuart during the Jacobite rebellion of 1745
- Spouse: Mary O'Shiell (m. 1741)

Antoine Vincent Walsh (22 January 1703 – 2 March 1763) was a French merchant, ship owner, and slave trader of Irish descent. He operated in Nantes, Province of Brittany. Born into an expatriate Irish family who had settled in Nantes, his support for Jacobitism led Walsh to assist Charles Edward Stuart during the Jacobite rebellion of 1745.

== Early life ==
Antoine Walsh was the son of the Jacobite loyalist Philip Walsh (1666–1708), of Ballynacooly, County Kilkenny, a Waterford merchant, who settled in Saint Malo, Brittany, after the Treaty of Limerick in 1691, and who would die at sea on an African voyage. Philip Walsh married in 1695, at Saint Malo, Anne White (1675–1727), who was also an Irish Catholic exile. It was Philip who had conveyed the defeated James II of England from Kinsale, County Cork, Ireland to Saint Malo, Brittany, France, in 1690, after the Battle of the Boyne, thus starting the Walsh family's loyal connections to the exiled House of Stuart in France.

Antoine was born on the 22 January 1703, in Saint Malo, Brittany, France. After serving in the French Navy, he settled in Nantes, which had emerged as the France's chief slaving port; where he found advantage in its close-knit Irish community.

== Career ==
He became a merchant was a major figure in and made a fortune from the Atlantic slave trade of Nantes. slave-trading and plantation-owning had made him the friend of kings. Antoine became wealthy on the back of the slave trade. The trade operated in a triangular fashion, supplying Africa with textiles, brandy, and firearms; slaves for the French West Indies in Martinique, Guadeloupe, and Saint-Domingue; sugar and tobacco for Europe.

== Marriage ==
In 1741 he married Mary O'Shiell, a French-Irish businesswoman in Nantes in France, where she is a known figure in the history of Nantes, alongside her sisters Agnés O'Shiell and Anne O'Shiell. She was the daughter of the Irish Jacobite Luke O'Shiell (1677–1745), who was born in Dublin but emigrated to Nantes, France, after the Irish defeat of 1690, and Agnès Vanasse (1690–1724). The family manor of the O'Shiell, Manoir de la Placelière, at Château-Thébaud, south-east of Nantes, in the now French department of the Loire-Atlantique, became a key gathering place for the large Irish community of emigrants in Nantes.

== 1745 ==
In 1744 he commissioned a new French privateer the Du Teillay (18 guns), in Nantes. She played a central role in the Jacobite rising of 1745, ferrying Charles Edward Stuart to Ardmolich with supplies and funds to support his cause.

He took a leading role in the French Irish community's financing and planning and of Charles's expedition to Scotland, the 1745 Jacobite rising, and was a key figure in all aspects of the naval side of the rebellion. In his correspondence with the Prince, Walsh adopted the pseudonym Monsieur Le Grand and the young prince was called Mr Douglas; they also had face-to-face planning meetings at Navarre in April 1745. Antoine accompanied the Prince on the journey on board the Du Teillay (Captain Claude Durbé) on 7 July at Saint-Nazaire and they were joined by French escort warship the L'Elisabeth, bound for Ardmolich in Scotland. Two days later on the 9 July 1745 they were intercepted off the Lizard by HMS Lion, and were severely impeded in their mission when they exchanged fire, the Elisabeth was so badly damaged she had to return to port taking the arms and Irish volunteers with her.

The Du Teillay and was obliged to continue alone eventually arriving at Eriskay in the Outer Hebrides on 2 August, they then sailed onto Loch nan Uamh and two days later Antoine had to take his leave for France, leaving Charles with his eight companions to proceed to Glenfinnan where on 19 August 1745 he raised his Standard, despite having no money and no supplies.

In the same year Antoine's second son, Antoine Jean Baptiste Walsh (1745–1789) was born.

James III (James Francis Edward Stuart), the Prince's father, created him an Earl Walsh in the Jacobite peerage of Ireland on 20 October 1745.

After Culloden, on 16 April 1746 Walsh sent detailed proposals to Maurepas the French minister of marine for rescuing the prince, some of which was acted upon, however following risings failure he had fallen out of grace with the French court.

Coincidentally Charles was to return to Loch nan Uamh by the 20 September 1746 to the nearby Prince's Cairn, which marks the spot where he finally left Scotland forever on a French ship after the unsuccessful rebellion.

He sufficiently had recovered favour at court to be ennobled by Louis XV in December 1753.

== Château de Serrant ==
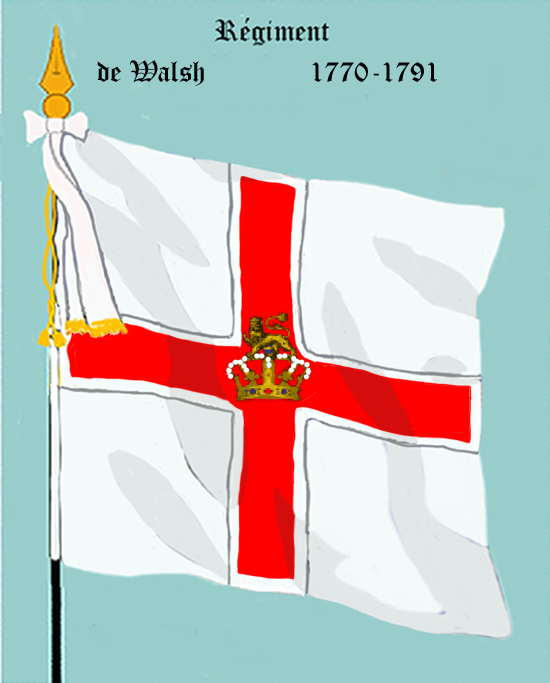
The Walsh Regiment

In 1749, Antoine assisted his brother François Jacques Walsh (1704–1782) in buying from the last surviving descendant of the de Bautru family, the lordship of Serrant in Anjou; coming with the Château de Serrant and its estate. The Walsh family set about redecorating the interior of the castle, they built an English style park, pavilions, and a monumental gate complete with the family crest.

Francois Jacques Walsh (a wealthy Nantes shipowner in his own right) was ennobled as the Comte de Serrant in 1754.

The château eventually passed out of the hands of the Walsh family in 1830 when Valentine Eugénie Joséphine Walsh de Serrant married the Duc de La Trémoïlle (1764–1839). La Trémoïlle set to the task of restoring the castle and added several features, including parapets and cornices. The La Trémoïlle family still own the château.

== Later life ==
In 1755, the O'Shiell family became ennobled.

Antoine remained a trusted friend of the Prince, acting as an intermediary with Frederick II of Prussia's ambassador to Paris the Earl Marischal in their dispute in 1754.

He died at Cap-Français, Saint-Domingue on 2 March 1763.

On his death his Jacobite peerage passed to his second and only surviving son, Antoine Jean Baptiste Walsh, Comte de Serrant.

== Irish Brigade (France) ==
The Walsh family are connected with the Irish Brigade. After the Glorious Revolution, Louis XIV founded the brigade in May 1690, it consisted of three regiments; one of which will be renamed the Walsh regiment in 1770; when it was led by a nephew of Antoine, born in Cádiz, home to another colony of officers and shipowners, who were Jacobites.

Peerage of Ireland
New creation	— TITULAR — Earl Walsh; Jacobite peerage 1745–1763	Succeeded by Antoine Walsh
