= Anne O'Shiell =

French businesswoman

- Born: 20 November 1720; Nantes, France
- Died: 30 June 1793 (aged 72); Nantes, France
- Occupation: businesswoman
- Known for: managed trade firm Grou et Michel
- Spouse: Guillaume Grou (m. 1741; died 1774)
- Children: none
- Parents: Luc O'Shiell (father); Agnès Vanasse (mother)
- Relatives: Mary O'Shiell and Agnès O'Shiell (sisters)

Anne O'Shiell (20 November 1720, Nantes – 30 June 1793, Nantes) was a French businesswoman. She managed the major slave trade firm Grou et Michel in Nantes from 1774 to 1793, which at that time was one of the most successful companies of its kind, making her a millionaire.

== Life ==
Anne O'Shiell was the daughter of the Irish Jacobite exile and successful slave trade merchant Luc O'Shiell (1677–1745) and Agnès Vanasse, and the sister of Mary O'Shiell and Agnès O'Shiell. Her family and their manor Manoir de la Placelière were the center of the Irish of Nantes, and the manor was known as a gathering place for Jacobites.

In 1741 she married the millionaire slave trader Guillaume Grou (1698–1774). Anne had no children.

When her father died in 1745, she and her sisters Agnes and Mary inherited the Manoir de la Placelière, which was bought by Anne and her spouse in 1747. In 1755, her birth family was recognized as nobility by the French crown.

When she was widowed in 1774, she inherited a vast fortune from her husband. She also inherited his slave trade firm, Grou et Michel, one of the biggest companies in Nantes. Her firm was a big player in the Nantes slave trade at a time when Nantes was a major port in the Atlantic slave trade. During the French Revolution, the slave trade was abolished.

She died in June 1793, during the Battle of Nantes. In November 1793, her fortune was confiscated by the revolutionary government.
