= Blanche Moria =

French sculptor and feminist

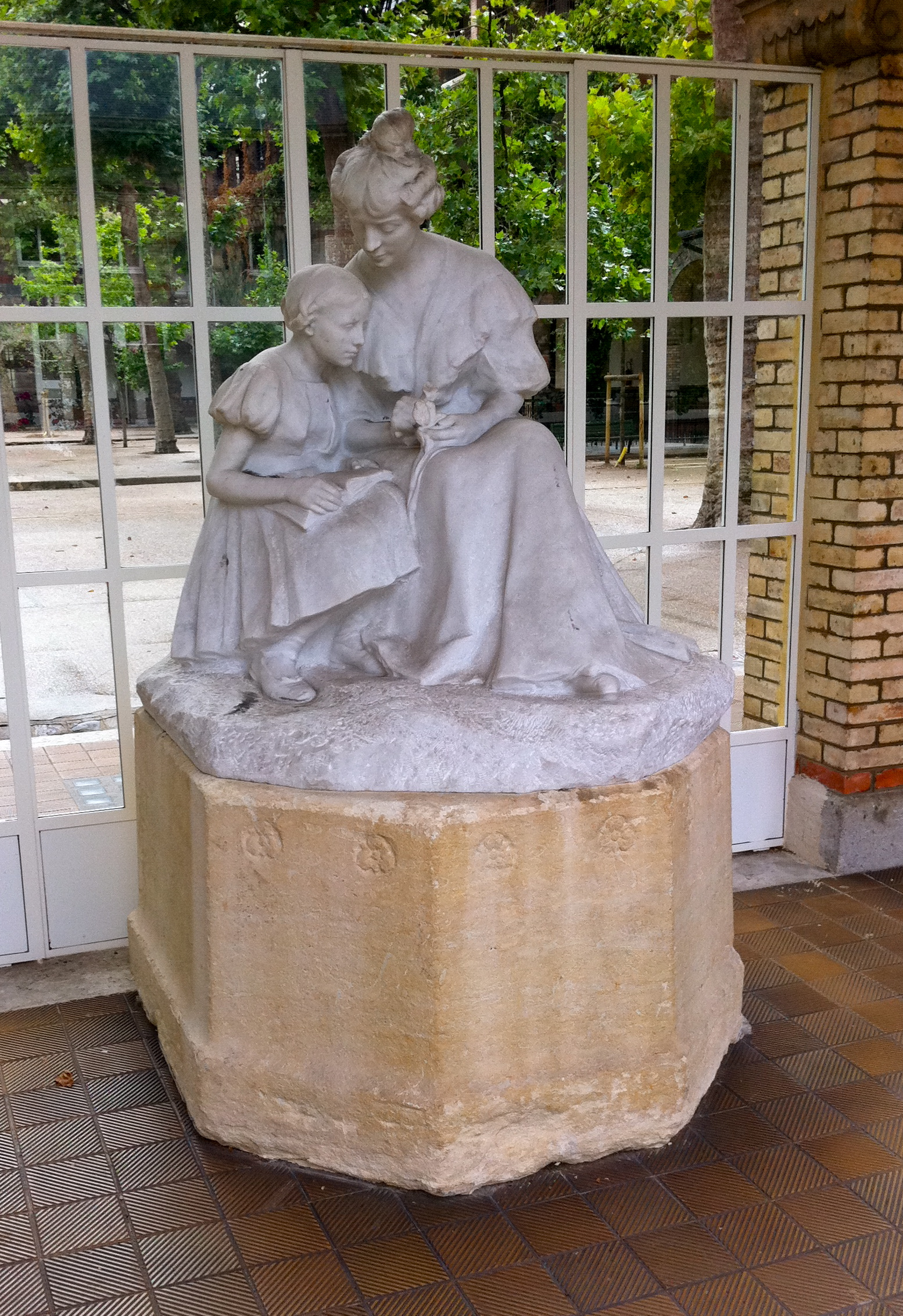
Moria's statue at the Lycée Molière, Paris, depicting a history lesson

Blanche Adèle Moria (1859–1926) was a French sculptor, medallist, educator and feminist. A designer of busts, medals and monuments, she exhibited in various salons from 1883 and received many commissions from the State. As a feminist, Moria fought for women's rights, especially better access for women to education, jobs and politics. As a member of the Ligue Française pour le Droit des Femmes (French League for Women's Rights), in 1921 she contributed an article on women artists to the collection Cinquante ans de féminisme.
