= Anaïs Ségalas =

French playwright, poet and novelist (1811-1893)

- Anne Caroline Menard
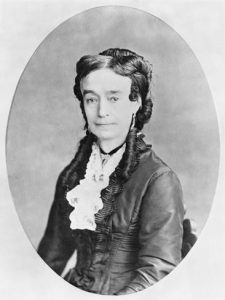
- Born: 24 September 1811; Paris, France
- Died: 31 August 1893 (aged 81); Paris, France
- Resting place: Pere-Lashaise
- Spouse: Jean Victor Ségalas
- Writing career
- Genres: Plays, novels, poetry

Anaïs Ségalas (24 September 1811, Paris – 31 August 1893, Paris), born Anne Caroline Ménard, was a French playwright, poet, and novelist. She was a member of the Société La Voix des Femmes in Paris in 1848 and of other Parisian feminist organizations.

== Life ==
Anne Caroline Ménard was born on 24 September 1811 in the former 6th arrondissement of Paris. She was the only daughter of Charles Ménard and Anne Bonne Portier, a Creole from Santo Domingo. Her father, Charles Ménard, was a vegetarian, an activist for animal welfare, and a misanthrope. When he died, Ménard was 11 years old.

Ménard became acquainted with the neighbor, Jean Victor Ségalas, a lawyer at the Royal Court and got married on 17 January 1827. She took the name Anaïs Ségalas and made her husband promise never to oppose her passion for writing. Ségalas’ first poems were published in 1827. In 1829, La Psyché published her first essays, and in 1831, eight poems Les Algériennes appeared in La Gazette littéraire. In the mid-1830s, Ségalas collaborated with a Christian newspaper Le Journal des Femmes.

On 15 December 1838, Ségalas gave birth to her daughter Bertile Claire Gabrielle, to whom she dedicated the volume Enfantines published in 1844. In 1847, Ségalas published a collection of moralizing and didactic poems on various aspects of women's lives titled La Femme. The next year, in 1848, she became a member of Société La Voix des Femmes in Paris and of other Parisian feminist organizations.

In the 1840s, Ségalas started to write theater plays. In 1847, her first play La Loge de l'Opéra, a drama in 3 acts, was performed at the Odeon Theater. In the following years, her plays Le Trembleur, Les Deux Amoureux de la grand’mère and Les Absents ont raison were staged in Paris theaters.

In 1861, she published a collection of poetry, Idéal et Réalités.

Aged 81, Ségalas wrote her last comedy in 1 act Deux passions which had a world success.

Anaïs Ségalas died on 31 August 1893 in Paris. In 1917, the French Academy created the Anaïs Ségalas Prize for Literature and Philosophy, intended to reward the work of talented women. The last prize was awarded in 1989.

== Works ==
- Les Algériennes, poésies, 1831
- Les Oiseaux de passage, poésies, 1837
- Enfantines, poésies à ma fille, 1844
- Poésies, 1844
- La Femme, poésies, 1847
- Contes du nouveau Palais de Cristal, 1855
- Nos bons Parisiens, poésies, 1864
- La Semaine de la marquise, 1865
- Les Mystères de la maison, 1865
- La Dette du cœur, poésies, 1869
- La Vie de feu, 1875
- Les Mariages dangereux, 1878
- Les Rieurs de Paris, 1880
- Les Romans du wagon. Le Duel des femmes. Le Bois de la Soufrière. Un roman de famille. Le Figurant, 1884
- Le Livre des vacances. L'Oncle d'Amérique et le neveu de France. Zozo, Polyte et Marmichet. Une rencontre sur la neige, 1885
- Récits des Antilles. Le Bois de la Soufrière, 1885
- Les Deux Fils, 1886
- Poésies pour tous, 1886
- Le Compagnon invisible, 1888

== Theater plays ==
- La Loge de l’Opér, 1847
- Le Trembleur, 1849
- Les Deux Amoureux de la grand’mère, 1850
- Les Absents ont raison, 1852
- Les Inconvénients de la sympathie, 1854
- Deux passions, 1893

== Bibliography ==
- Albistur, Maïté and Daniel Armogathe. History of French feminism from the Middle Ages to the present day. 2 flights, Paris: Des Femmes, 1977.
- Beaunier, André. Faces of women. 5th ed. Paris: Plon-Nourrit, 1913.
- Cooper, Barbara T. "Race, Gender, and Colonialism in Anaïs Ségalas’s Stories from the West Indies: Le Bois de la Soufrière." In "Engendering Race: Romantic-Era Women and French Colonial Memory," edited by Adrianna M. Paliyenko, special issue, L'Esprit Créateur 47, no. 4 (Winter 2007): 118–29.
- Czyba, Luce, “Anaïs Ségalas (1814-1893)". In Women poets of the nineteenth century: An anthology, edited by Christine Planté.185-92. 2nd ed. Lyon: University Press of Lyon, 2010.
- Delaville, Camille Chartier. My contemporaries. 1st ser. Paris: P. Sévin, 1887.
- Desplantes, François, and Paul Pouthier. Women of letters in France 1890. Geneva: Slatkine Reprints, 1970.
- Jacob, Paul. “Mrs. Ségalas". In Biography of Women Authors, edited by Alfred de Montferrand, 37–47. Paris: Armand-Aubrée, 1836.
- Moulin, Jeanine. “Female poetry from the 12th to the 19th century". Paris: Seghers, 1966.
- Dried, Alphonse. The French muses: Anthology of women poets from the eighteenth to the twentieth, 2 vols. Paris: Louis Michaud, 1908–1909.
- Sullerot, Evelyne. History of the women's press in France from its origins to 1848 . Paris: Armand Colin, 1966.
