= Nantes slave trade =

A slave slave taking place onboard the Nantes slave ship Marie Séraphique in 1773

The Nantes slave trade was the purchase of more than 500,000 black African slaves in Africa and the transportation of them to the Americas, using ships originating from the port of Nantes. They were generally sold into French ownership, mainly in the Antilles. The trade lasted from the late 17th to the beginning of the 19th century. With 1,744 slave voyages, Nantes, France, was the principal French slave-trading port for the duration of this period.

The slave trade was explicitly encouraged by the royal family and described by the church as an "ordinary occupation." The town was the last centre for the slave trade in France, until its abolition in 1831.

== Context ==
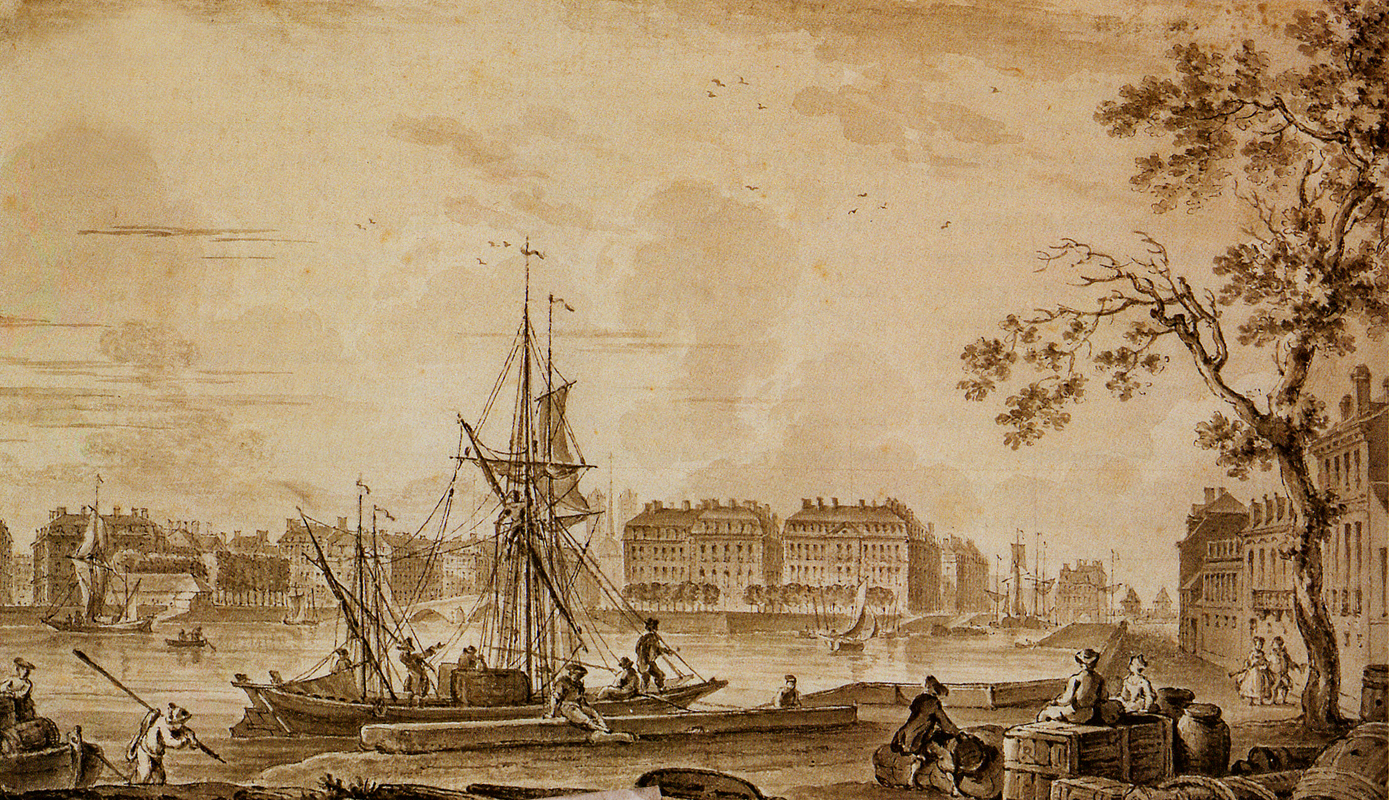
18th century view of Nantes port from l'île Gloriette, attributed to Nicolas Ozanne.

The transatlantic slave trade, between Europe and America, transported 12 to 13 million Africans to the New World, the majority of those from the end of the 17th century onwards. In 1997, the historian Hugh Thomas claimed that 13,000,000 slaves left Africa as a result of the slave trade, of which 11,328,000 arrived at their destination, over 54,200 voyages. The larger part of the trade was carried out by ships with their home port in the Americas. Within Europe, every large European port was involved in the slave trade, although to varying degrees. English ports were at the forefront; with 4,894 expeditions departing from Liverpool and 2,704 from London.

Metropolitan France launched around 4,200 slave-ships and finds itself third place amongst slave-trading nations, after Great Britain and Portugal. The town of Nantes alone organised 1,744 expeditions, or 41.3% of the total for France. The following towns, in order of importance, together made up 33.5% of French slave voyages: Bordeaux, La Rochelle and Le Havre.

The importance of Nantes in the slave trade can be explained as very important: the town benefits from its proximity with Lorient, the home of the French East India Company, which allowed the supply of Indiennes and money cowries, which were highly appreciated by slave merchants. This situation compensated for the shallow draft of the Loire estuary, which was limited to eleven feet and so allowed only for ships at a maximum of 150–170 tonnes in fully loaded conditions to reach Nantes. The Gironde estuary, however, had a draft of 14 to 16 feet, as a result of which 250 vessels could reach Bordeaux, a port situated far from the major routes between London and the Po Valley, capable of exporting the riches offered by the Aquitaine Basin. Nantes entered the slave trade relatively late, in 1707. The ship-owners found the triangular trade much more profitable than direct trade, which consisted in undertaking journeys between Europe and the Americas, as at the turn of the 17th century the port dealt mainly in interregional and European trade (encompassing the Iberian Peninsula, the British Isles and the North Sea), of which the majority of the traffic dealt in traditional commerce, in use since the medieval period, with products such as flour, wine and salt.

== Timeline of the slave trade in Nantes ==
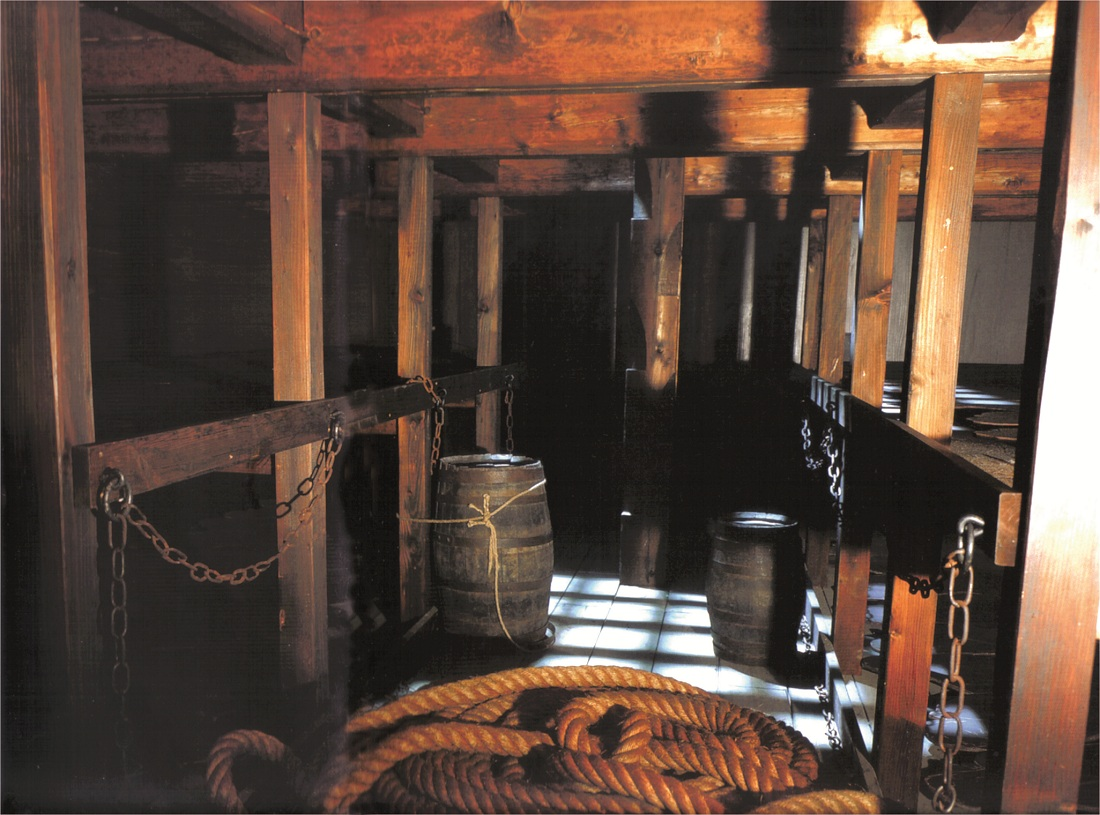
Reconstruction of the steerage of a slave-ship featured in the "Les Anneaux de la Mémoire" exhibition at the Château des ducs de Bretagne in Nantes (1992–1994).

=== Beginning ===
The first ship in Nantes to be utilised in the slave trade was most likely the Hercule in 1707, launched by the compagnie du Sénégal and belonging to the Montaudouin family.

Then, after a 4-year pause (between 1707 and 1711), traffic began again in 1712 with 7 ships. Over the following 15 years the number of slave-ships launched increased:

Annual number of slave-ships launched from Nantes

| 1713 | 1715 | 1716 | 1717 | 1718 | 1719 | 1720 | 1721 | 1722 | 1723 | 1727 | 1728 |
|---|---|---|---|---|---|---|---|---|---|---|---|
| 14 | 20 | 2 | 11 | 12 | 9 | 20 | 16 | 11 | 24 | 6 | 10 |

From the 1730s onwards, the tonnage of Nantes slave-ships was constantly growing, going from a little over 1,000 tonnes in 1735 to 6,000 tonnes in 1740.

=== 1740 to 1752 ===
The years which followed were much more chaotic: the War of the Austrian Succession, in which France participated, hindered maritime commerce – which was, at the time, the main battleground for the Anglo-French rivalry. Therefore, the tonnage of slave-ships in Nantes was extremely low, never surpassing 500 tonnes, during the three years of the conflict (1745, 1746 and 1747). The Treaty of Aix-la-Chapelle, signed in 1748, allowed a gradual increase in commercial activity again, with more than 1,000 tonnes passing through the port. The following year, however, this tonnage reached a record number of 9,000 tonnes.

The years 1750 and 1751 saw a lull in activity, due notably to the fact that ship-owners in Nantes were waiting to discover the results of their post-war investments. A slave-ship's voyage through a system of triangular trade between Europe, Africa and the Americas generally took between 14 and 18 months.

=== 1752 to 1763 ===
As reassured Nantes ship-owners saw, over the years 1752, 1753 and 1754 their tonnage surpassed 5,000 tonnes. This was considered a period of strong commercial activity, as from 1735 to 1759 this number would only be exceeded five times. In 1755, trade slowed and reached only 3,000 tonnes, before completely crashing between 1756 and 1763 as a result of the Seven Years' War, during which the British captured the French possessions of Gorée and Saint-Louis in Senegal, both of which were major players in the French slave trade; the French colony of Guadeloupe fell in 1759.

=== 1763 to 1793 ===
The signing of the Treaty of Paris in 1763 allowed trade in Nantes to re-establish itself to a high level of activity, even if the 699 expeditions organised during the following 30 years would represent less than half of the French slave trade as a whole during this period, whereas Nantes had accounted for over 50% before the conflict. From then on until the first abolition of slavery in 1793, this share would continue to fall.

Nantes' share of traffic in the French slave trade
| Period | Percentage of trade from Nantes |
|---|---|
| 1763–1766 | 49.3% |
| 1767–1771 | 42.5% |
| 1772–1778 | 34.4% |
| 1783–1789 | 34.3% |
| 1789–1793 | 36.1% |

This loss of market-share is explained by several factors, notably:

- by the loss of the exclusive privilege in the trade of slaves from the African coast which had been held by the French East India Company to encourage their participation in the trade, until 31 July 1767. On 30 September 1767, Channel ports (Saint-Malo, Le Havre and Honfleur) were granted exemption from the tax of 10 livres tournois per slave sold in the Antilles. The exemption was extended to La Rochelle on 4 February 1768 and to Bordeaux on 21 March of the same year.
- by the change of business by ship owners in La Rochelle into the slave trade, seeking to compensate for the fall in fur trade as France lost control of Canada, and so went into competition with their Loire counterparts.

However, even if the number of slave voyages fell from an average of 29 per year (between 1763 and 1766), to 22.2 (between 1767 and 1771) and 20.6 (between 1772 and 1778, i.e. the beginning of the American Revolutionary War), the overall tonnage fell more slowly (from an average of 3,954 tonnes per year between 1763 and 1766, to 3,556 tonnes between 1772 and 1778), which means that while ship-owners in Nantes deployed less ships, they used vessels with a greater capacity. The average capacity of a slave-ship went from 140 tonnes after the Seven Years' War, to 175.5 tonnes between 1772 and 1778.

After American independence, 32 ships were launched on average per year between 1783 and 1788, making 193 ships departing from Nantes during this period, against 116 from Bordeaux, 111 from Le Havre and 75 from La Rochelle. During the first two years of the French Revolution, 89 slave-ships were launched from Nantes (46 in 1789 and 43 in 1790). Between 1789 and 1793, the port of Nantes accounted for 36.1% of slave trade traffic with 152 ships: as much as the output of their main rivals, Bordeaux and Le Havre, put together.

During the same period, the number of slaves transported by Nantes ships numbered 200,000. These slaves were taken mainly from the Gulf of Guinea (principally the region of Calabar, on the south east coast of what is now Nigeria) and the "Angola coast" (now part of Angola and the Republic of the Congo), numbered as follows :

Number of slaves transported by Nantes slave-ships
| Period | Number of slaves |
|---|---|
| 1763–1766 | 32,300 |
| 1767–1771 | 33,854 |
| 1772–1778 | 35,161 |
| 1783–1788 | 55,932 |
| 1789–1793 | 38,361 |

Nantes traders were not only capable of adapting to market conditions in both America and Africa, but were also capable of changing the point of sale according to competition. It was, nevertheless, in Saint-Domingue that they sold the majority of their human cargo. Making use of a network of relations across the island, it became the exclusive domain of Loire slave traders. Cap Français (now Cap-Haïtien) and Port-au-Prince were the main points of sale and welcomed, respectively, 30 and 25% of Nantes slave-ships. The latter dealt with 46.8% of the supply of provisions to Port-au-Prince, 60.7% in Léogâne, 64.7% in Cayes and 81.6% in Saint-Marc.

The August 1793 decree for the abolition of slavery put an end to all slave trade activity across all French territory for nine years.

=== 1802 to 1830 ===
The re-establishment of slavery by Napoléon Bonaparte in 1802, revived slave trade activity for 15 years (accounting for 70% of national trade, with more than 300 expeditions), however, this was achieved illegally, as the French Royal Navy fought successfully against illegal traffickers throughout the 1820s until the prohibition of the trade in 1831 which eventually led to the definitive abolition of slavery instigated by Victor Schlœlcher on 27 April 1848.

== Economic effect ==
The 18th century undeniably marked the peak of Nantes trade and the town's development which saw its population double, rising from 40,000 to 80,000 inhabitants over the course of the century

=== Maritime trade ===
Naturally, the trade's greatest impact was on port activity, even if transatlantic ships (including not only slave-ships, but those involved in direct trade with the American isles, and Privateers) never accounted for more than 25.4% of the total tonnage entering Nantes port in 1772.

Triangular trade also stimulated the rise of "direct" trade between Nantes and the islands, as at the end of their circuit the slave traders themselves only brought back the commodities derived from the sale of slaves in "plantation colonies", such as sugar and coffee, therefore requiring other ships to come from Nantes and load up the surplus.

Commodities brought back to Nantes port from the colonies were varied: sugar, coffee, cotton and indigo were unloaded on the new Fosse quay which from then on took over the majority of port-activity from the former "port au Vin" (now the Place du Commerce). These products were resold with substantial profits, whether to fuel the interior French market or to supply the burgeoning local industry. Sugar (mainly raw or brown sugar, destined for the national market) was, by far, the most greatly imported product in Nantes, amounting to 22,605,000 lbs in 1786, making up 60.8% of the total value of imported merchandise.

The commercial activity produced by triangular trade generated the success of maritime commerce within the kingdom of France and with the rest of the European continent. As a result, the tonnage directed towards foreign ports increased from 8,352 tx in 1702, to 30,428 tx in 1772 (a ratio of 1:3.6), while the tonnage delivered to French ports during the same period passed from 32,276 tx to 61,686 tx (1:1.9), making Nantes therefore the first port of French commerce.

=== Industry ===
The slave trade increased the wealth of great merchant and ship-owning families, which they invested in as much in agricultural land, in property (in hôtels particuliers or Lustschloss), as in the growing industry which developed alongside traditional artisanal industry. As a result, in 1775, no less than 17 factories were in business in the city.

Triangular trade throughout the 18th century also benefited the development of Shipbuilding. The 18th century was marked by notable growth in the size of Nantes boatyards, which expanded from 3,230 m^{2} (34,800 sq ft) at the turn of the century, to 50,067 m^{2} (538,920 sq ft) in 1780, as these became the first French merchant ship builders.

== Memorial ==
A memorial to acknowledge the role of France in the New World slave trade was dedicated in Nantes in 2012.

== See also ==
- Bristol slave trade

== Bibliography ==
- Leroux, Émilienne (1984). Histoire d'une ville et ses habitants - Nantes - Des origines à 1914. ACL. ISBN 2-86723-000-4.
- Meyer, Jean (1977). Histoire de Nantes (in French). Toulouse. ISBN 2-7089-4717-6.
- Michon, Bernard (2007). "La traite négrière nantaise au milieu du s-XVIII (1748-1751" (PDF). Centre national de la recherche scientifique. Les Cahiers des Anneaux de la Mémoire, n° 10 : Les Ports et la traite négrière, Nantes, p. 34-63 (in French). Archived from the original (PDF) on 14 September 2011.
- Michon, Bernhard (2008). "Nantes au temps de l'apogée négrier : la place de la traite dans le commerce nantais" (PDF). Le Boucan (in French).
- Weber, Jacques. "La traite négrière nantaise de 1763 à 1793" (PDF). Centre national de la recherche scientifique (in French). Archived from the original (PDF) on 14 September 2011.
