= Jardin des plantes de Nantes =

Municipal botanical garden in Loire-Atlantique, Pays de la Loire, France

Coordinates: 47°13′10″N 1°32′34″W

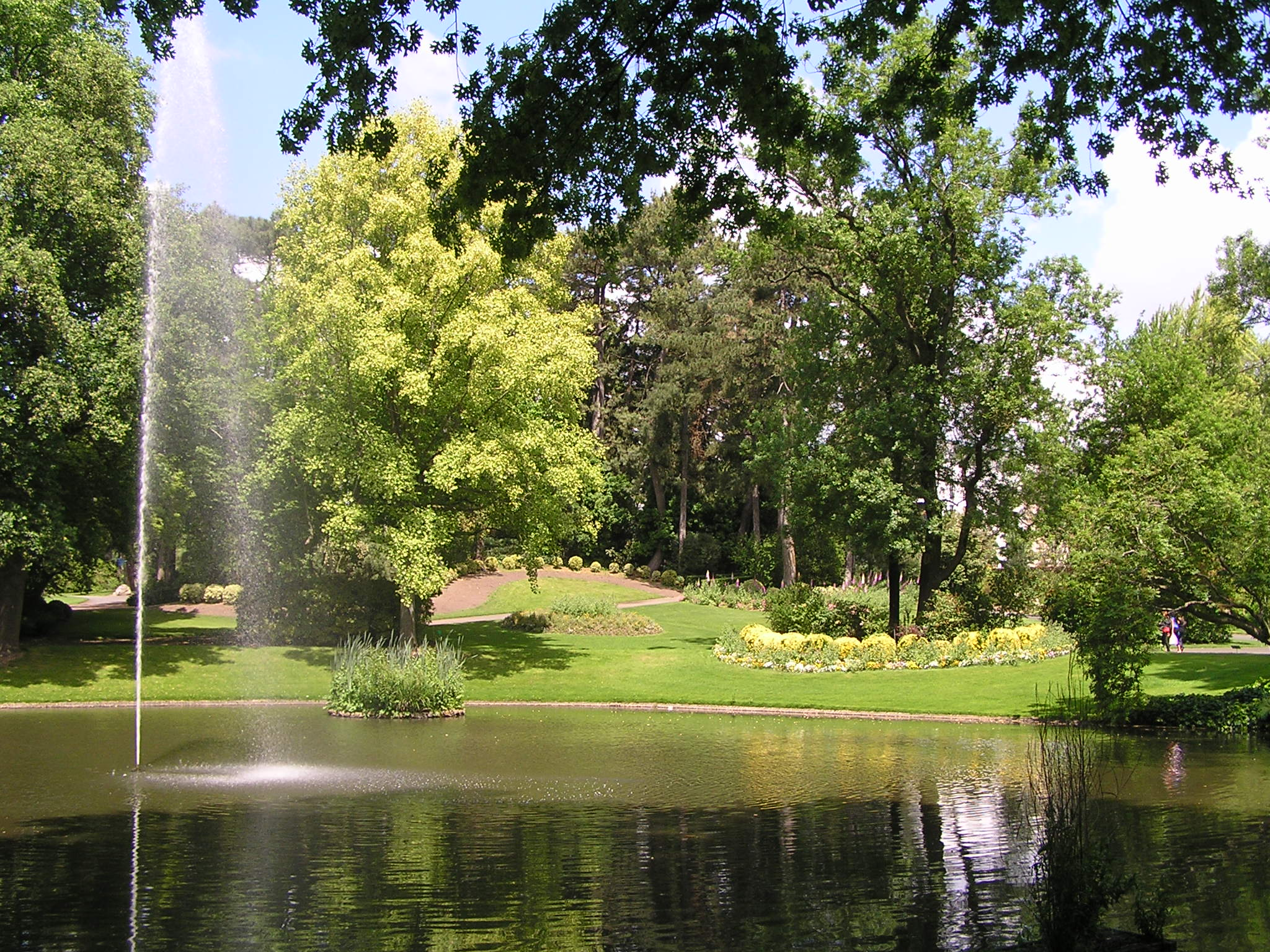
Jardin des plantes de Nantes

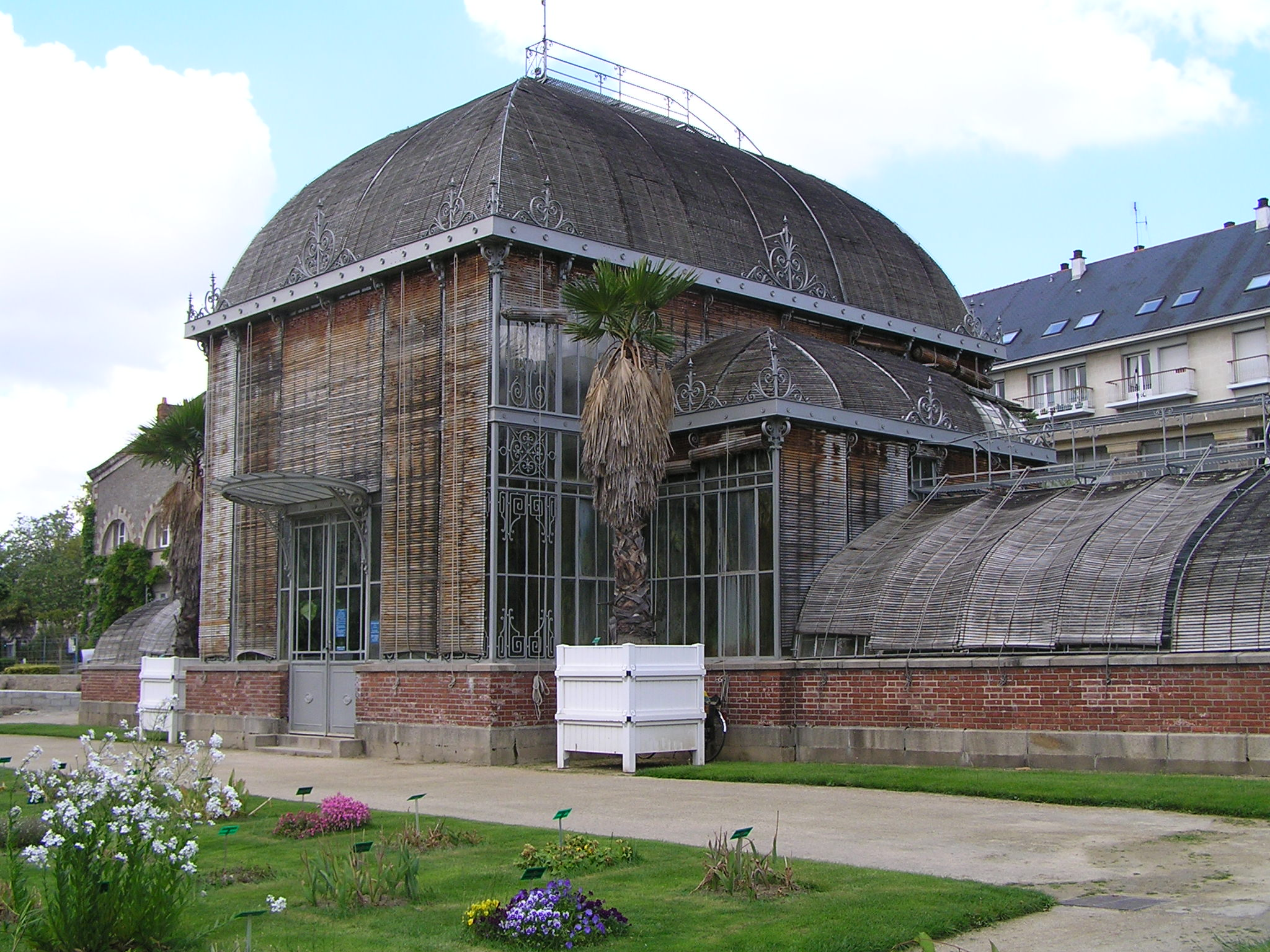
Palm house

The Jardin des plantes de Nantes (73,280 m^{2})(Breton: Liorzh louzawouriezh Naoned) is a municipal botanical garden located on Rue Stanislas Baudry, Nantes, Loire-Atlantique, Pays de la Loire, France. It is open daily without charge, but a fee is charged for the greenhouses.

The city's earliest botanical garden dated to 1688 as a small medicinal plant collection outside the city walls, near today's Rue Paré. It subsequently fell into disuse but in 1726 was revived as a Royal Garden for exotic plants. By 1790 the garden contained more than 600 species but by 1795 the garden had dwindled to fewer than 150 exotic plants; it again reverted to a medicinal garden, and slowly declined until its demise in 1877.

The current garden was first established in 1806 under the leadership of Jean Alexandre Hectot, and by 1807 contained a magnificent magnolia which still endures (the Magnolia d'Hectot, 16 years old when transplanted). It became a municipal garden in 1820 and opened to the public in 1829. Under director Jean Marie Ecorchard, it was restyled as an English park containing some 2500 species. In 1840 it contained 12 camellia varieties, 4 peony varieties, 202 chrysanthemum varieties, a good rose garden, and an enormous Yulan Magnolia that took four men a full day to plant. A second section was added in the 1840s with greenhouse built in 1845 and ponds and an artificial "mountain" added several years later. The last section was created in the 1850s, including a remarkable fountain (1859) that operated for 130 years without maintenance or repair. Unfortunately, the disastrously cold December 1879 caused extensive destruction, including the loss of 245 trees and 600 shrubs; most of the existing magnolia collection, with the exception of its oldest specimens, were lost. After more than a decade of neglect, active restoration began in the early 1890s under the leadership of Paul Marmy, who built the garden's palm house 1895-1898 and orangery in 1899. By 1900 the garden was substantially complete in its current form.

Today the garden contains about 11,000 species planted within a web of ponds, waterways, and paths, with an artificial "mountain" and fine collection of statues, as well as pavilions, fountains, and cascades. It features an excellent collection of camellias (600 cultivars), mature specimens of Magnolia grandiflora (219 years old), Liriodendron tulipifera (150 years), Sequoiadendron giganteum (150 years), and Sequoia sempervirens (150 years), Aesculus hippocastanum (140 years), Platanus × hispanica (140 years), as well as fine specimens of Arbutus unedo, Carpinus betulus, Ginkgo biloba, Liquidambar styraciflua, Pterocarya caucasica, and Quercus mirbeckii.

The garden's palm house and greenhouses (800 m^{2}) are also notable. East and west wings contain an exceptional collection of epiphytes, including orchids of the African lowlands and Asian mountains respectively. The taller central pavilion (10 meters) houses plants of tropical America. The Orangerie shelters citrus trees during the winter, and the dry greenhouse contains a good cactus collection, said to be one of the best in France.

== Notable people ==
- Paul Marmy (1851–1897), Jardin director around 1890

== See also ==
- List of botanical gardens in France
