= Carmelite convent, Nantes =

Catholic convent in France, 1318–1790

Former Carmelite Convent at Nantes
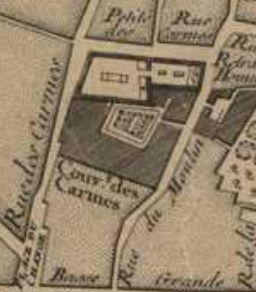
- Detail of a map of Nantes, France, drawn by François Cacault in 1756–1757. This section shows the site of the former Carmes convent.
- Interactive map of Former Carmelite Convent at Nantes
- Location: Nantes, Kingdom of France
- Coordinates: 47°13′00″N 1°33′17″W
- Type: Convent
- Completion date: 14th century
- Dismantled date: 1790

The Carmelite convent at Nantes was a convent of the Carmelite Order established in 1318 in Nantes, France, then situated within the Duchy of Brittany. The convent was gradually destroyed beginning with the French Revolution.

== Location ==
In the extant urban configuration, the convent was established between Rue des Carmes and Rue du Moulin, at the level of Rue des Trois-Croissants, in an area traversed by Rue des Bons-Français.

== History ==
=== Foundation ===
In 1318, Thibaut II de Rochefort (circa 1260–after 1327), Viscount of Donges, an officer of the Duke of Brittany in Nantes (and perhaps governor of the city), established a Carmelite convent. He adhered to a prevalent tradition during that era, whereby dominant noble families selected a congregation to house their family tombs, enhancing their prestige. The Rochefort family was subsequently regarded as "one of the oldest houses of Breton aristocracy."

Thibaut II requested the assistance of six monks from the Ploërmel establishment, the inaugural Carmelite convent in Brittany, established in 1273 by his former overlord, Duke John II (1239–1305). He sought their collaboration in establishing a convent, which he initially situated in the "Hôtel de Rochefort." This substantial building and its surrounding land were at the intersection of the present-day Rue Saint-Vincent and Rue Fénelon. Thibaut de Rochefort commissioned the construction of an oratory, and the inaugural prior was named Jean de Paris.

However, the Cordeliers, who had established themselves not far from there to the northeast, invoked a privilege granted to them by Pope Clement IV. This privilege, as recorded in various sources, permitted the Cordeliers to prevent the establishment of any other religious order within a distance of 140 canes (approximately 210 meters or 310 meters, depending on the sources) of one of their establishments. Subsequently, the Carmelite convent was relocated to the Hôtel de Rougé, located between the current Rue des Carmes and Rue du Moulin, between 1325 and 1327. In addition to the fact that the building had previously been used as a tavern, a public bordello was located on the opposite side of Rue de Verdun, which allowed those opposed to the Carmelites to disparage the new establishment. Nevertheless, the order settled there. The original building was large, with the great hall becoming the base of the nave of the future church.

The Cordeliers, with the support of the Jacobins, continued to protest against this establishment until 1345, but their efforts were ultimately unsuccessful. In 1348, in exchange for the foundation of two masses, the knight Alain de Saffré transferred ownership of a house to the convent.

=== Expansion under John IV of Brittany ===
The development of the convent encountered a significant challenge: the establishment's enclosure was traversed by the Gallo-Roman wall, which was under the ownership of the duke. It was only after the War of the Breton Succession that the situation transformed. The victory of John IV over Charles of Blois benefited the Carmelites, as the Franciscans of the Cordeliers Convent had supported the defeated side. Upon the entry of the new duke into the city, two miracles were purported to have occurred after invoking the Virgin of the altar of Our Lady of the Carmelites, situated in the Carmelite oratory. John IV, presumably desirous of garnering the favor of the citizens of Nantes to reinforce his recent triumph, resolved to bestow upon the Carmelites the portion of the wall that traversed the convent, the residence designated as "Tour-neuve," and an adjacent dwelling. The newly acquired properties enabled the establishment of a substantial garden area to the south of the convent. Additionally, the duke provided the requisite wood for the construction of the planned Carmelite church. The Carmelite chapel (also referred to as a church) was constructed between 1365 and 1372. The building of the convent itself spanned from 1369 to 1384. A final acquisition, situated close to Rue de Verdun, permitted the erection of a structure that housed the chapter room, with a refectory above, where a dormitory was arranged.

=== Expansion under John V of Brittany ===
In 1420, Duke John V of Brittany provided the financial resources necessary for expanding the establishment. During his captivity by Marguerite de Clisson at the Château de Champtoceaux in May of that year, he made a vow to donate his weight in gold to the convent should he succeed in escaping. Upon his release, the duke honored his pledge, presenting a collection of jewelry, coins, and goldsmith's work, valued at the time at a considerable sum, to the establishment (the inventory of which has been preserved). He made this donation while wearing his war harness. Subsequently, the duke and his successors reclaimed a portion of this treasure. Nevertheless, the duke's magnanimity enabled the monks to procure land and expand the convent between 1421 and 1488. They constructed edifices along Rue des Carmes and an infirmary along Rue de Verdun, among other structures.

=== Tomb of Francis II of Brittany ===
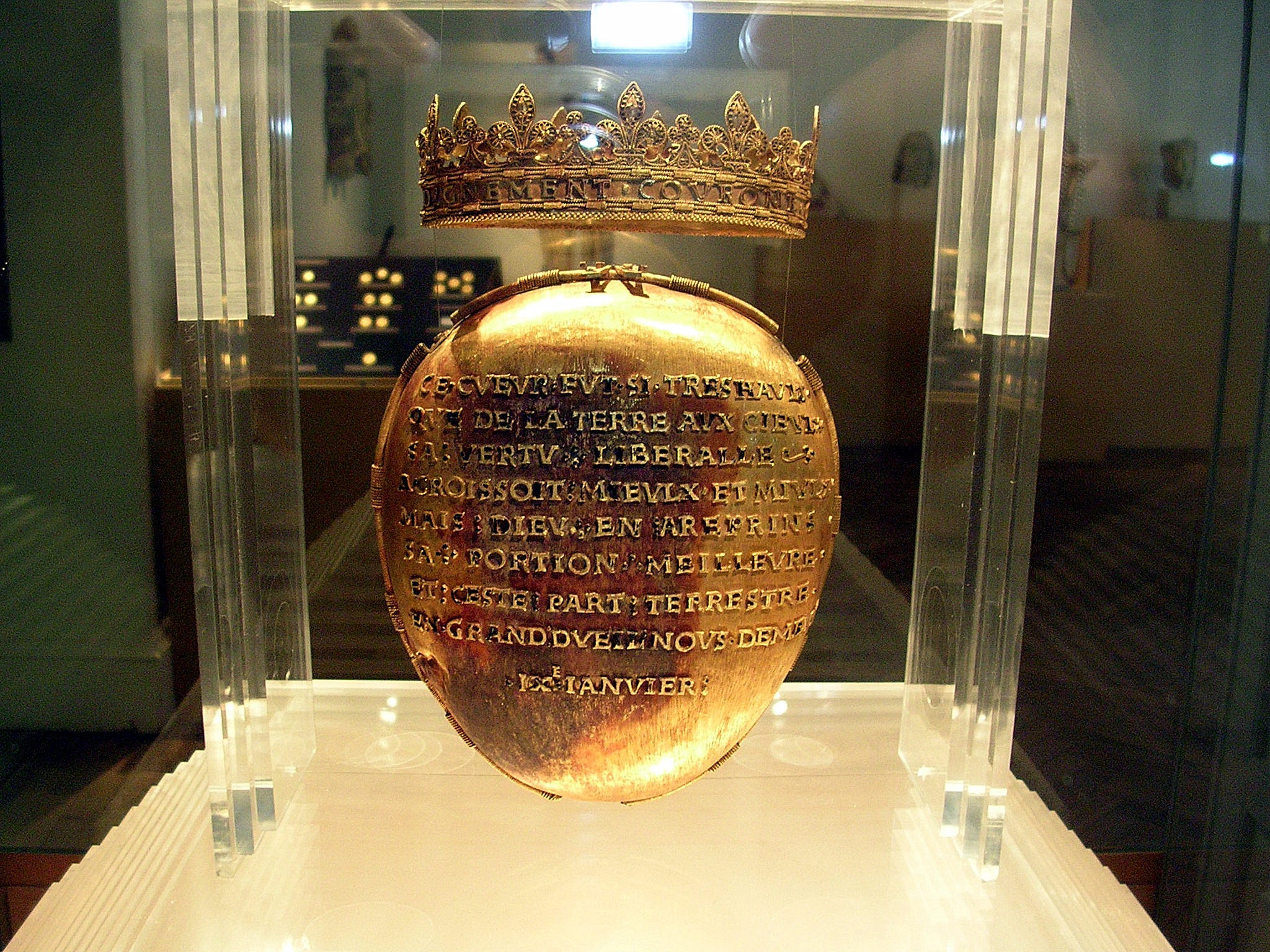
The heart of Anne of Brittany.

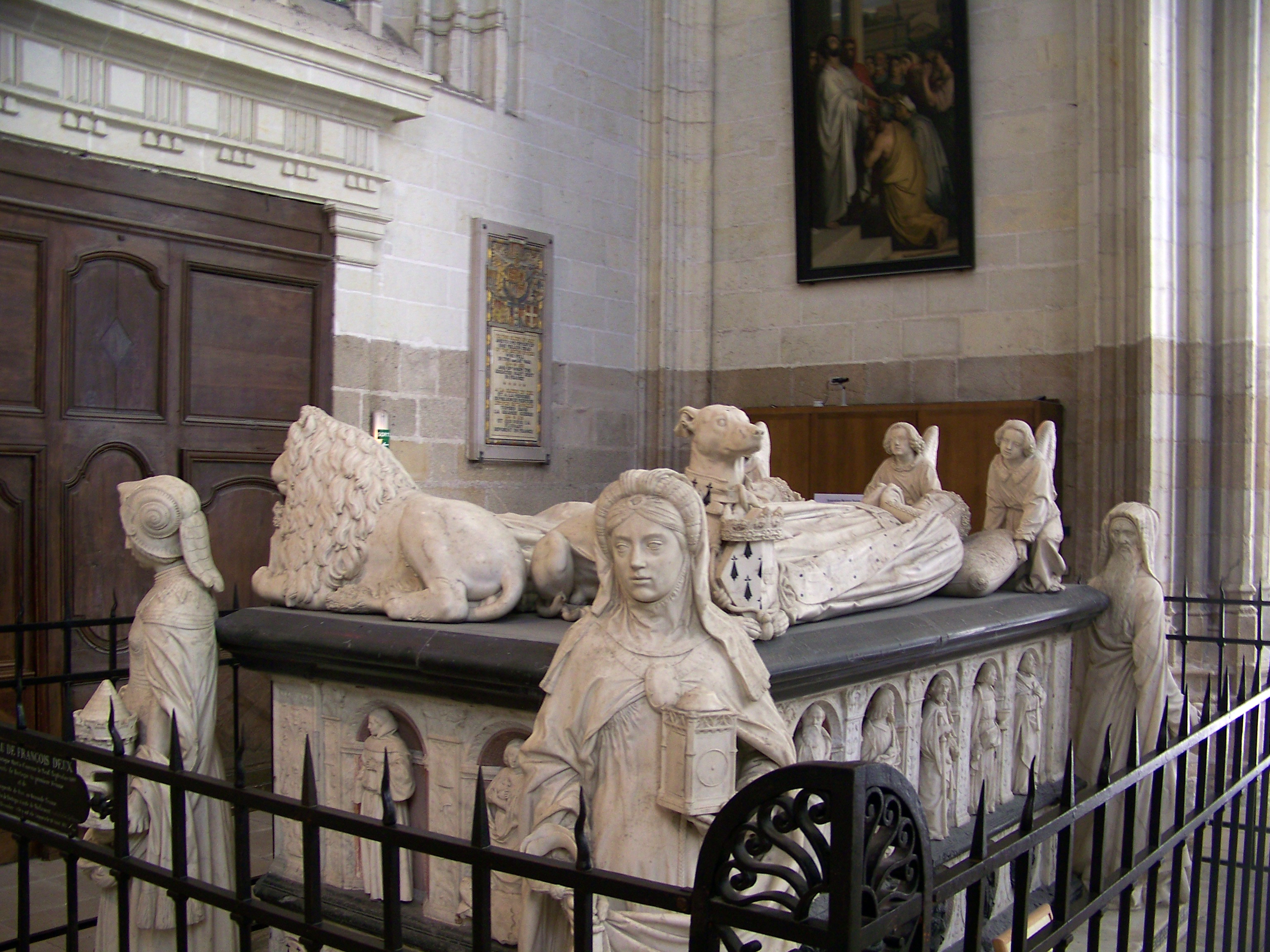
Tomb of François II of Brittany, completed in 1507 in the chapel of the Carmes, from which it was removed in 1792 and transferred in 1817 to the Cathedral of St. Pierre and St. Paul in Nantes.

In 1499, Anne of Brittany initiated the project to create a tomb adorned with sculptures, including the recumbent figures of her parents, Francis II of Brittany and Marguerite of Foix. This monumental work was designed by the painter Jehan Perréal and executed by the sculptor Michel Colombe between 1502 and 1507. Francis was interred in the Carmelite chapel, alongside his first wife, Marguerite of Brittany. In 1506, the Duchess and Queen of France obtained authorization to transfer the remains of her mother and her father's second wife, Marguerite of Foix, to the Carmelite church, where the tomb was completed. Upon the interment of the body in 1507, the tomb contained three remains. Following her demise in 1514, Anne of Brittany was laid to rest in the Basilica of Saint-Denis, by the tradition observed for Capetian monarchs. However, her heart, placed in a golden casket (or reliquary), was interred in the family tomb.

=== From the 16th century to the Revolution ===
In the 16th century, the establishment experienced a surge of enthusiasm characteristic of all religious brotherhoods. During the years 1532–1533, the Carmelites had a membership of 435. The establishment served as the venue for the meetings of the city's consular judges. During one of these meetings, which took place in 1577 and 1578, the windows of the hall in which they were held were repaired.

In the aftermath of the 1590 flood of the Loire, the reliquary containing the heart of Anne of Brittany was exhumed for inspection.

Following the conclusion of the Wars of Religion in the 17th century, the chapel was remodeled to address the deterioration of the convent buildings that had resulted from the conflict. In 1605–1608, the master painter and sculptor Antoine Blassel was commissioned to create a tabernacle for the high altar. Subsequently, in 1617, Guillaume Belliard was remunerated by the municipality with 71 livres and 6 sous for the altar arrangement. Furthermore, the municipal authorities provided financial assistance in that same year for the closure of the choir. Indeed, the entire convent underwent a comprehensive renovation program starting in 1622. A new building, constructed to the east of the establishment, was inaugurated on 22 November. The Estates of Brittany were held at the Carmelite Convent in 1636 and 1638.

In 1727, Gérard Mellier, then mayor of Nantes, once again exhumed the casket containing Anne of Brittany's heart, citing concerns that the monks had melted down the gold within.

=== Dismantling ===
Towards the conclusion of 1789, during the French Revolution, a decision was made to designate certain properties as national assets. In May 1790, the decision was made to proceed with the sale of the Carmelite Convent. In the period between 22 and 22 November 1790, the architects Julien-François Douillard and Robert Seheult (father of François-Léonard Seheult) produced a plan of the establishment and provided an estimated valuation of 114,880 livres. In 1791, the monks were dispersed. An initial sale, held on 1 December 1790, was unsuccessful. It was not until 16 December that Julien Gaudin, a merchant from Rue de Richebourg, purchased the Carmelite Convent.

It should be noted, however, that the aforementioned sale pertained exclusively to the walls. The liturgical furnishings were to be sold separately. The sale included some items, including the organ, balustrades, marble columns that comprised the high altar, the figure of Christ that was situated above it, paintings, tapestries, a gilded tabernacle, and nine substantial church books, some of which were parchments. All items were stored on the premises until the sale was concluded. The new proprietor of the walls was inconvenienced by this arrangement, as the furnishings were situated in the nave, which he intended to demolish. The administration relocated the items to the choir of the church, which contained the tombs and was sealed to prevent intrusions. An inventory was prepared for the sale on 11 April 1792. The entire collection was placed under the supervision of the porter of the Notre-Dame Collegiate Church, which was also closed, and subsequently relocated to the church of the Cordeliers Convent. On 24 September 1793, a sale of furniture removed from closed churches was held at this location; however, it is uncertain whether the objects removed from the Carmelites were included in this sale.

In 1791, the tomb of François II was relocated to the cathedral, where it was subsequently concealed to prevent its destruction. The reliquary of Anne of Brittany was dispatched to the Monnaie de Paris in 1793, where it was melted down. Neglected and forgotten, it was subsequently recovered in a damaged state and transported to Nantes in 1852. Since then, it has been preserved by the Dobrée Museum.

In 1802, the former nave was transformed into a performance hall, the "Théâtre des Variétés," which was initially managed by the widow Charles "et Compagnie," and subsequently by individuals named Ferville and Potier. At the beginning of the 20th century, vestiges of the arcades and vaults were still visible at No. 3 Rue des Bons-Français and at Nos. 16 and 18 Rue des Carmes. By 1975, however, these structures had been entirely demolished.

== Income and properties ==
In the 17th century, the establishment derived its income from diverse sources, including "land rents, established rents, property rents, preaching fees, as well as casual earnings from the sacristy, not to mention alms and collections." An income report established in 1669 indicates that "casual earnings," defined as revenue derived from the provision of religious services, constituted 6,000 livres, or approximately 73% of the total resources, out of 8,000 livres. Another notable source of revenue was the rental of buildings or rooms. Between 1752 and 1790, the proportion of income derived from casual earnings ranged from a low of 15% in 1790 to a high of 53% in 1781, with an average of approximately 30%.

== Architecture ==
The architectural design of the convent is not well documented. The only surviving graphic elements are the plans, which were drafted by two architects, Julien-François Douillard and François-Léonard Seheult. In 1790, Prior Eloi de la Bellangerie was obliged to submit a report on the establishment's status. Although this report was probably drafted to emphasize the poverty of the Carmelites, it nevertheless allows us to gain insight into the distribution of the buildings at that time. The convent complex comprised three buildings situated around the cloister, with the northern section adjoining the church (or chapel). The eastern wing, situated along Rue du Moulin, was occupied by commercial establishments and the sacristy on the ground floor. The first floor was occupied by a room designated for university assemblies and the prior's chamber. The second floor was used as a dormitory for young religious members, while the third floor was designated for the library. The east wing of the cloister was formed by adjoining this building. On this side, the gallery was topped by a dormitory. The north wing ran along the church. The west wing bordered a building that housed a store on the ground floor, a refectory and a large room on the first floor, guest rooms and the infirmary on the second floor, and servants' quarters on the third floor. Finally, the south wing had a gallery topped by religious chambers.

The chapel, regarded as one of the most aesthetically pleasing ecclesiastical structures in the Duchy of Brittany after the Middle Ages, featured a single nave and a choir that was as lengthy but more confined in width than the nave. The sculptor Michel Colombe created two statues representing Saint Francis and Saint Margaret, as well as the crucifix located on the main altar. The choir, enclosed by a rood screen constructed from tuff and marble columns, was created in 1631 by Guillaume Belliard (who also constructed the rood screen of Nantes Cathedral), Michel Poirier, René Lemeunier, and directed by Jacques Corbineau. It was financed by a legacy from Jean de Rieux, Marquis of Assérac, and also housed the tomb of François II of Brittany and that of the Lords of Rieux.

== Remains ==
Some elements of the library have been preserved. In addition to the tomb of François II and the reliquary of Anne of Brittany's heart, almost no ornamentation or sculpture was preserved during the destruction of the convent during the revolutionary period.

=== Printed works ===
The Nantes media library preserves several works that were previously held by the Carmelite convent, including an incomplete copy of Saint Augustine's Enarrationes on Psalms 1 to 50. The library at Princeton University also holds the Carmelite Missal, a work that intertwines the history of the convent with that of the Montfort house.

=== Statuary ===
==== Discovery ====
It was not until 1863 that the proprietor of the edifice situated at Nos. 18 and 20 Rue des Carmes, Frédéric Mahaud, unearthed many statue fragments within the courtyard of his property. In 1867, he elected to donate his discoveries to the Dobrée Museum. This information was subsequently published by Stéphane de La Nicollière-Teijeiro, the city archivist, in the Bulletin archéologique de Nantes et de la Loire-Inférieure. However, the attribution of these works to the Carmelite convent is based solely on the location of their unearthing, as no documents have been preserved regarding the building. No inventory was conducted during the revolutionary period that would have mentioned these fragments. They were likely found because, during the 17th century, the chapel underwent a renovation, which included the renewal of the statuary. The medieval works were probably discarded and buried during the refurbishment, which would explain how they escaped the destruction and dispersal associated with the French Revolution. Once assembled, the remains allowed the reconstruction of nine statues, eight of which were complete.

==== Inventory ====
The sculptures whose provenance appears to be the former convent include those of Saint Mark, Saint Adrian (which may have originated from the Saint-Germain chapel, situated in proximity to the west gate of the church), Saint Matthew (the identification of the sculpted figure as this saint is a matter of contention), a bishop, and a deacon, which were discovered within the confines of the church. A comparative study indicates that the sculptures were produced by the same workshops that contributed to the cathedral's decoration over time. It can be reasonably deduced that the Carmelite statues were initially crafted by artists hailing from the Duchy of Brittany (the statue of Saint Mark, created circa 1420), followed by others from the Tours region (the remaining four statues, which were likely commissioned by Duke François II, circa 1460). Other statues listed include those of the Holy Trinity, Saint James, and an unidentified saint (the latter of which dates from the 16th century, in contrast to the others). Additionally, there is a fragment, a woman's head, which has been preserved since 1867 at the Thomas-Dobrée departmental museum.

Seven statues preserved by the Dobrée Museum

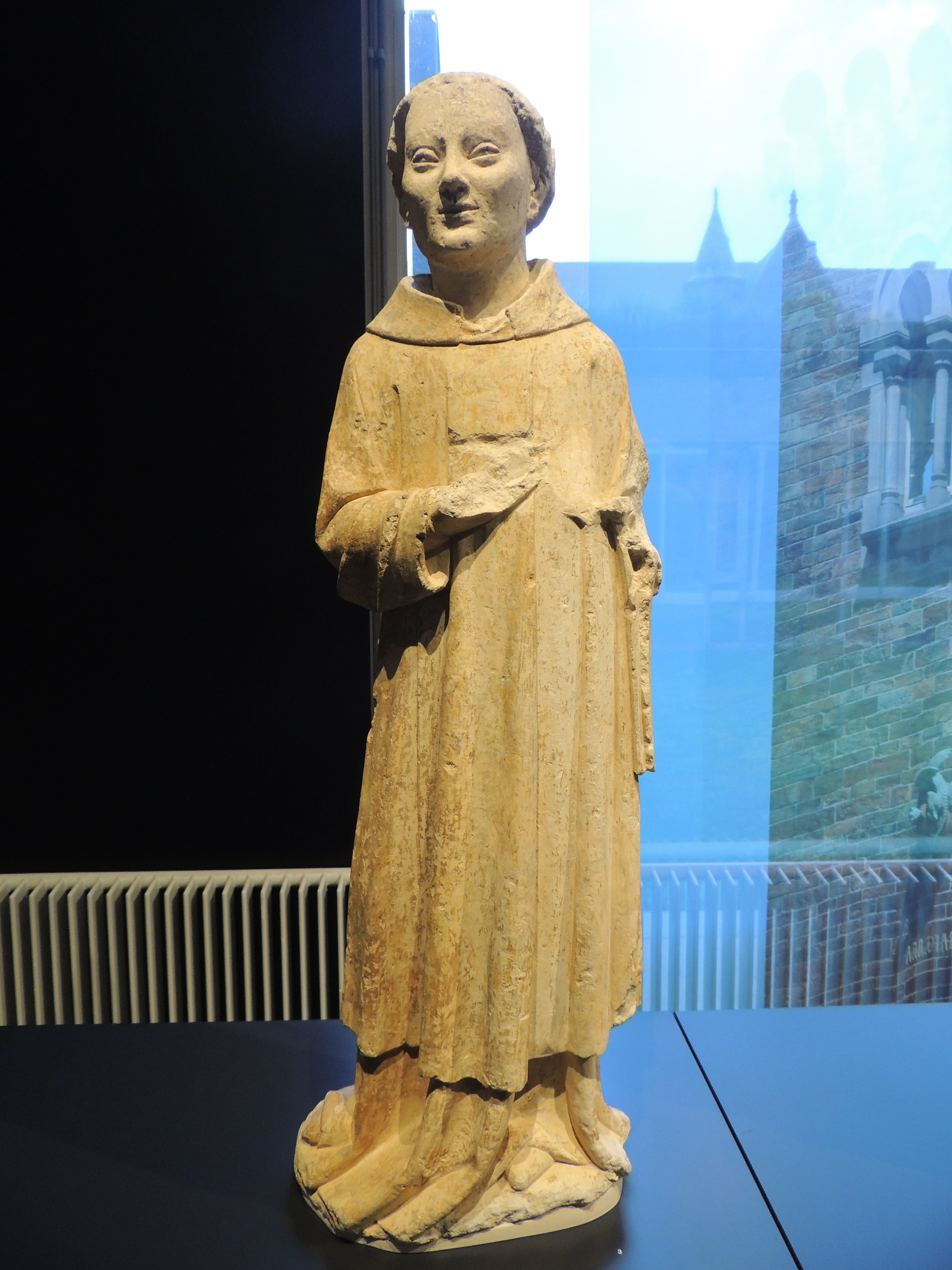
A deacon.

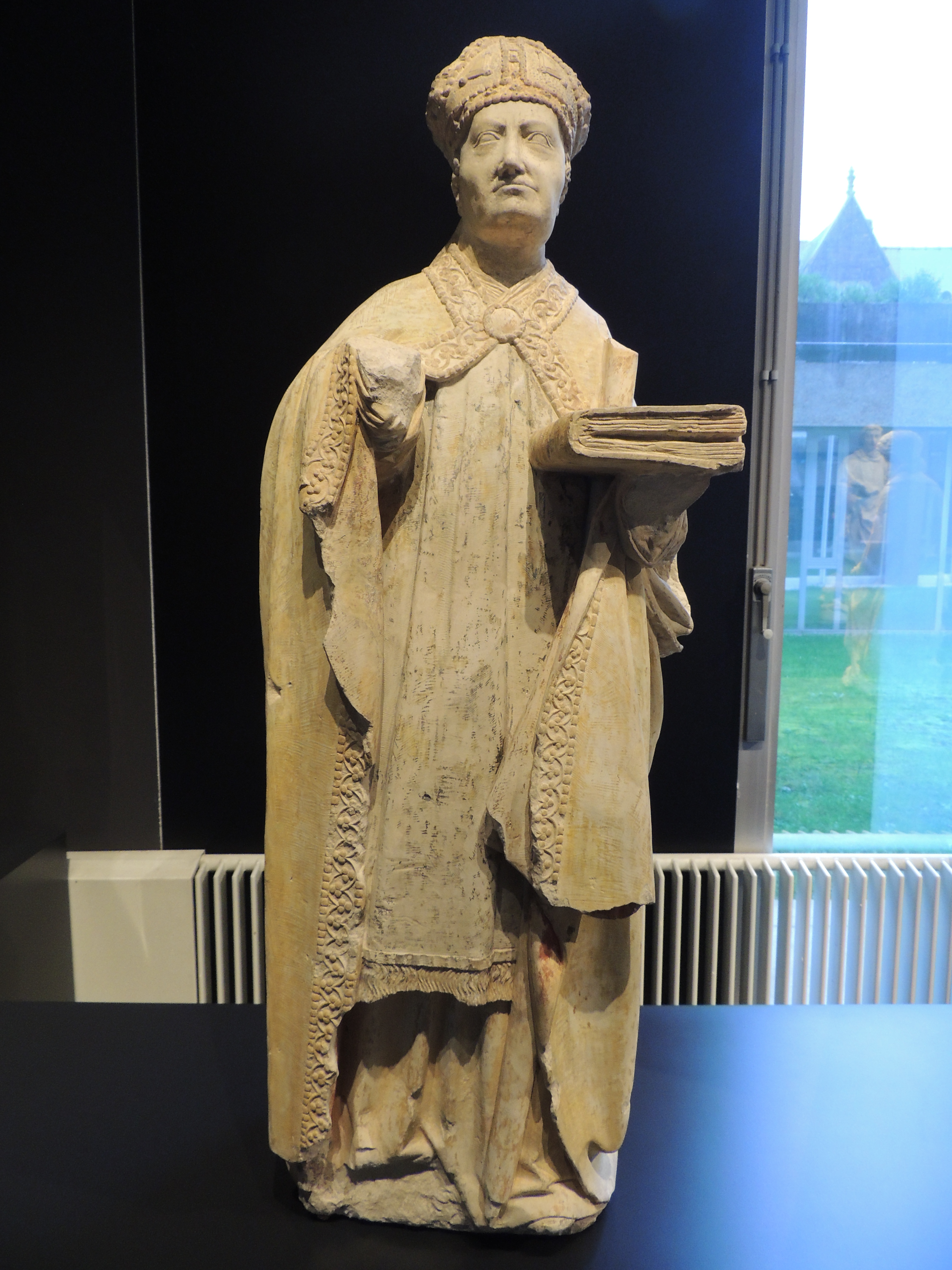
A bishop.

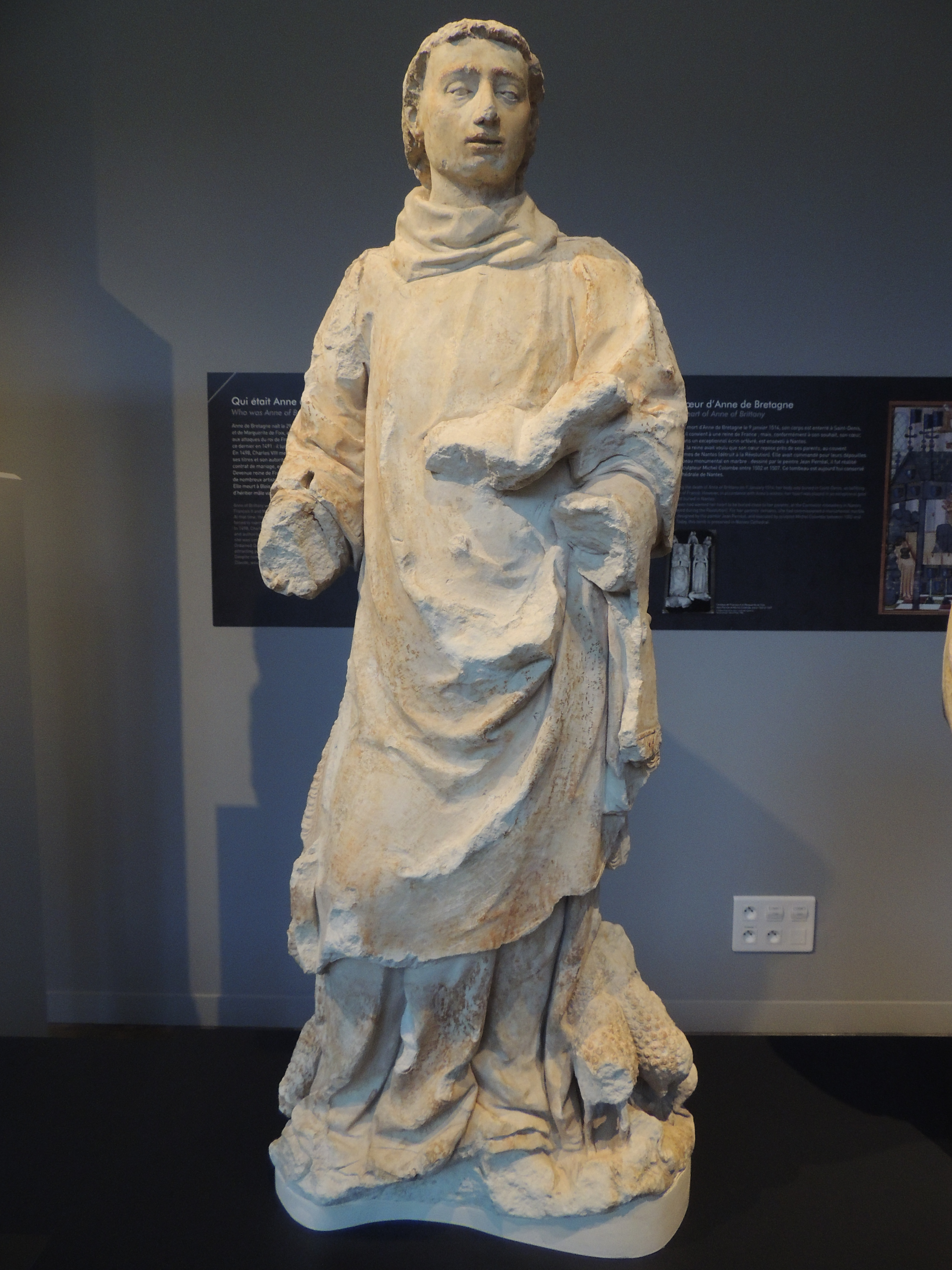
A saint.

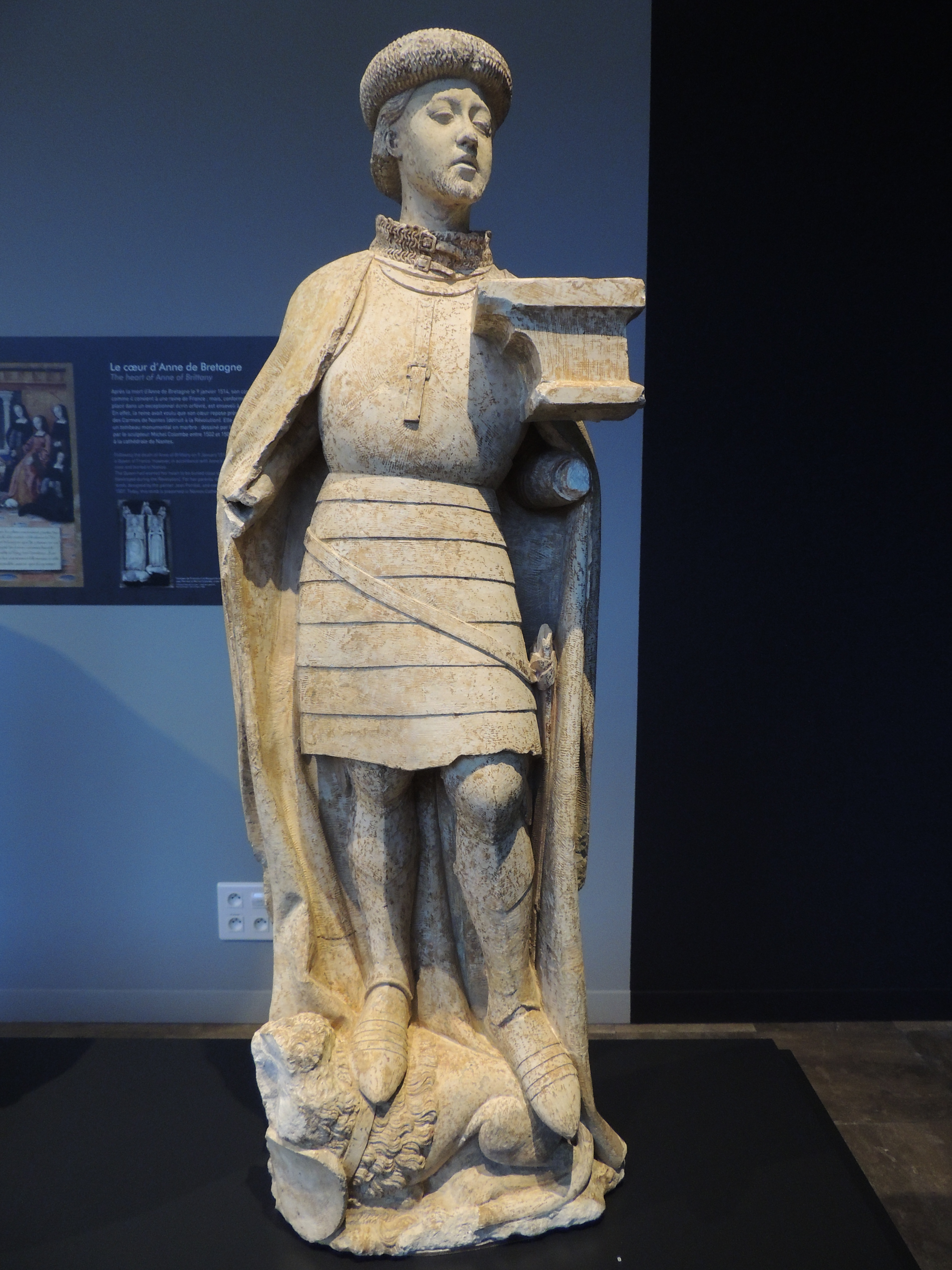
Saint Adrian.

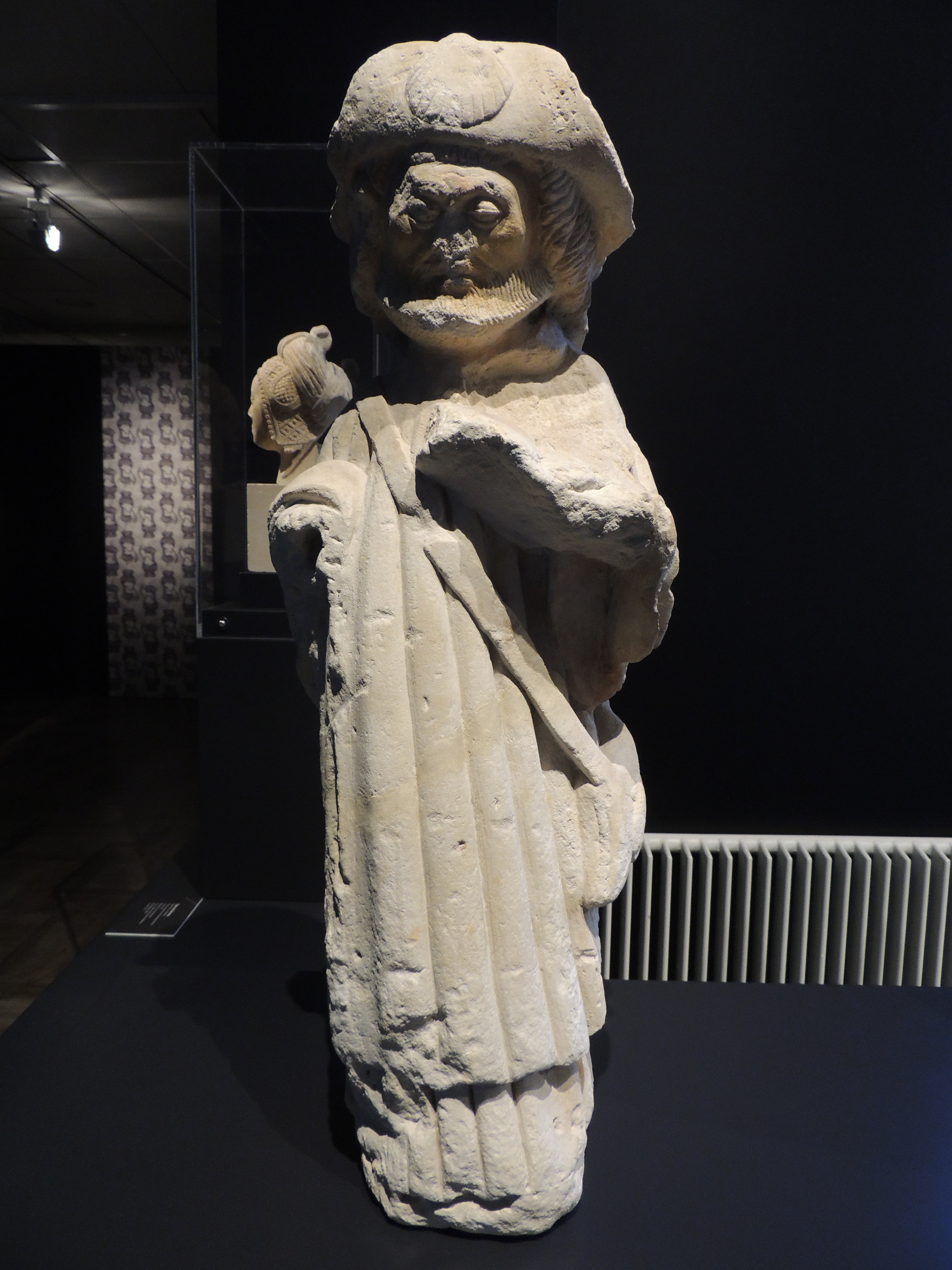
Saint James.

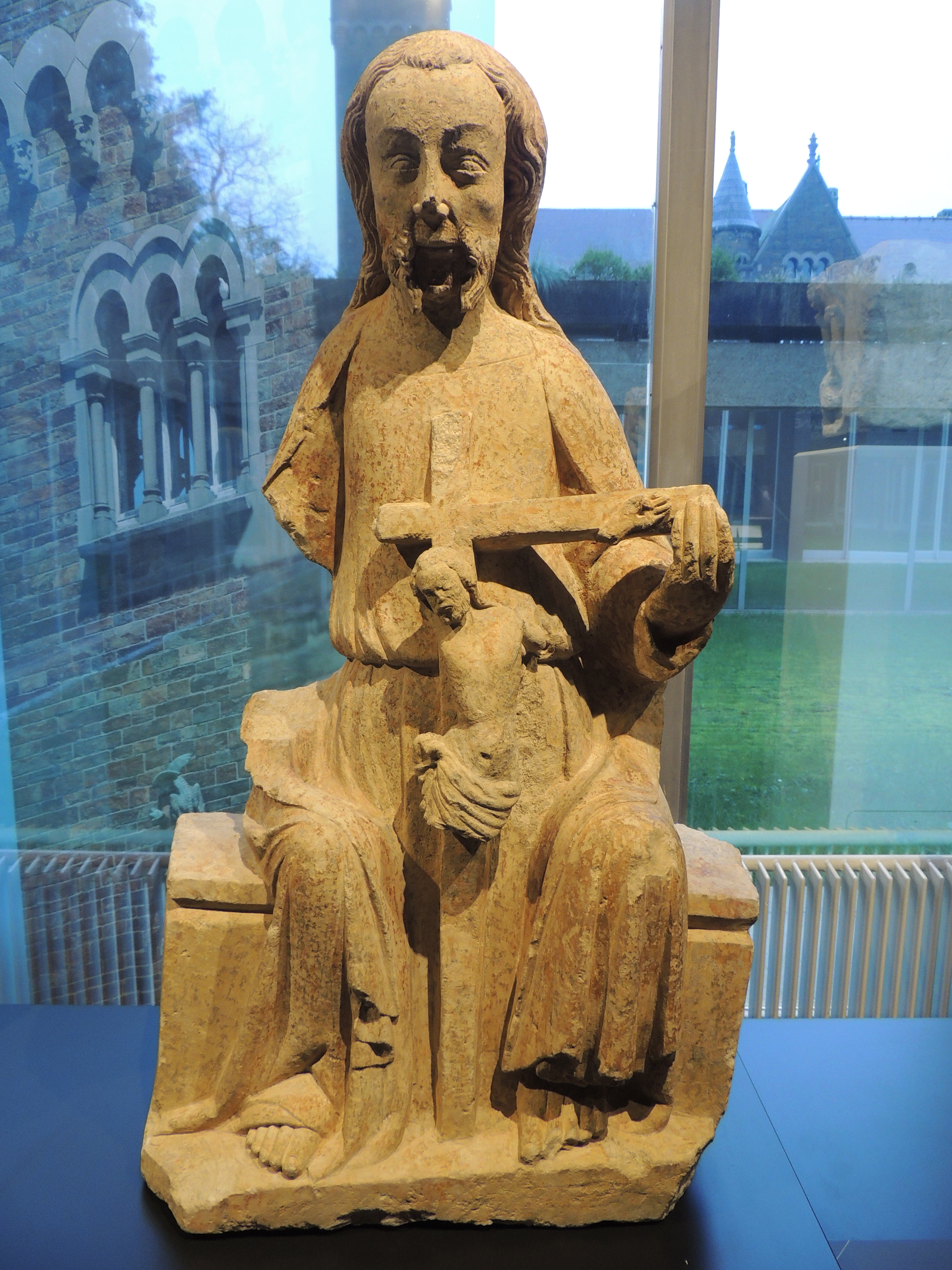
Holy Trinity.

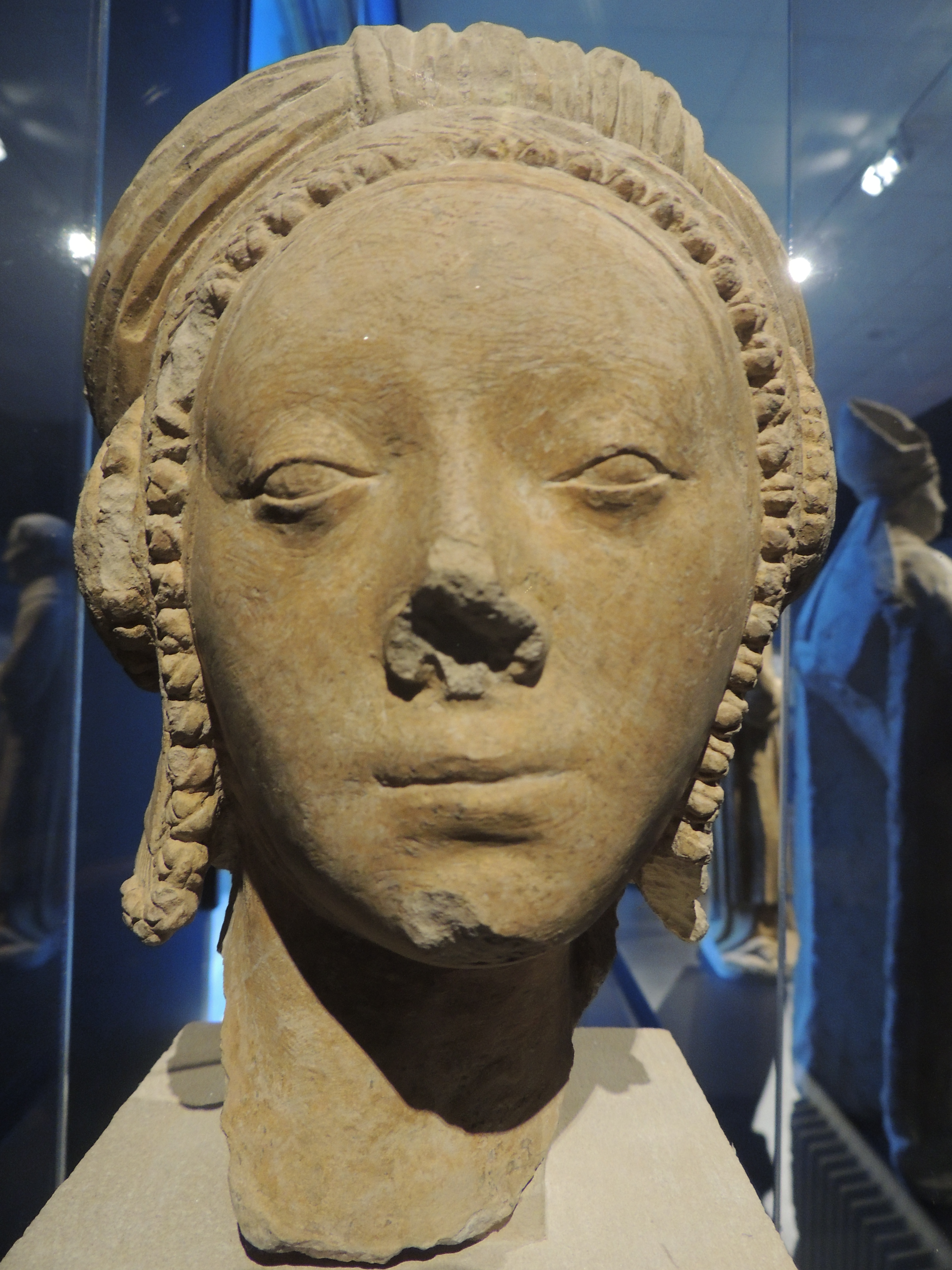
Vestige of a statue: a woman's head.

==== Statue of Saint Mark ====
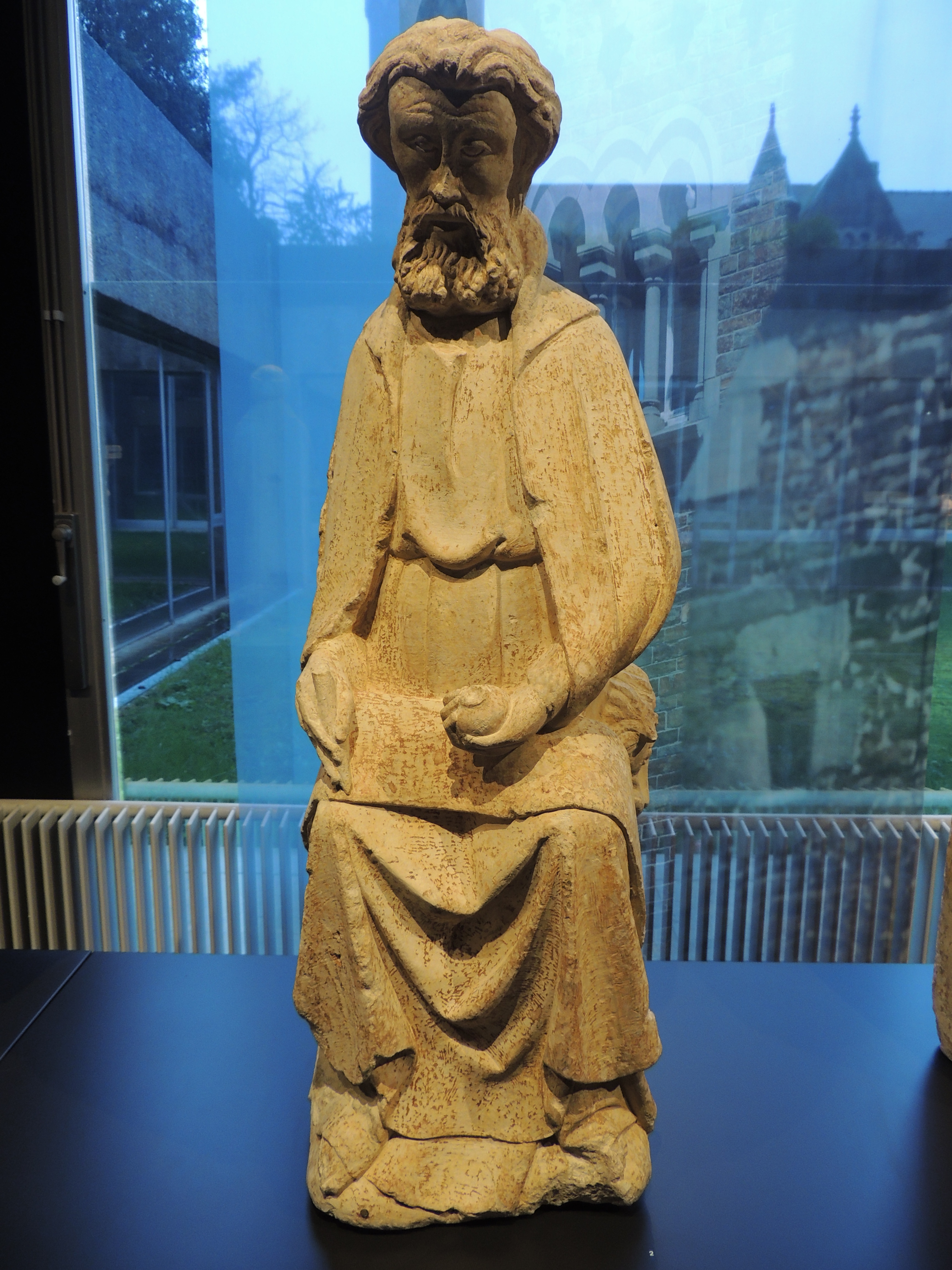
Statue of Saint Mark.

The statue of Saint Mark is now the oldest of those held by the museum. It was created around 1420, likely thanks to a donation from Duke John V made after his captivity at Château-Renaud. Although crafted by Breton artisans, the statue evinces a clear stylistic affinity with the artistic traditions of the Loire Valley. The quality of the craftsmanship is comparable to that of four statues from the early 15th century, which were situated at the base of the cathedral's crossing tower. Following the refurbishment of the choir, these statues were transferred to the Dobrée Museum. Saint Mark is depicted as an evangelist. The facial features are rendered with remarkable precision, in stark contrast to the somewhat lacklustre quality of the garment's craftsmanship. The statue is flanked by a winged lion, which serves as a symbol of Mark. The animal supports the saint, and a scroll extends from between its paws to the ground. The limestone sculpture has a height of 93 cm, a width of 30 cm, and a depth of 30 cm. The paint or whitewash that originally adorned the sculpture has been erased by the time. The composition suggests that the sculpture was placed at a height and not against a wall. The head is tilted and disproportionate, and the cord holding the garment does not encircle the waist but is placed higher on the torso, indicating that the artist tried to mitigate the effects of perspective.

==== Statue of Saint Matthew ====
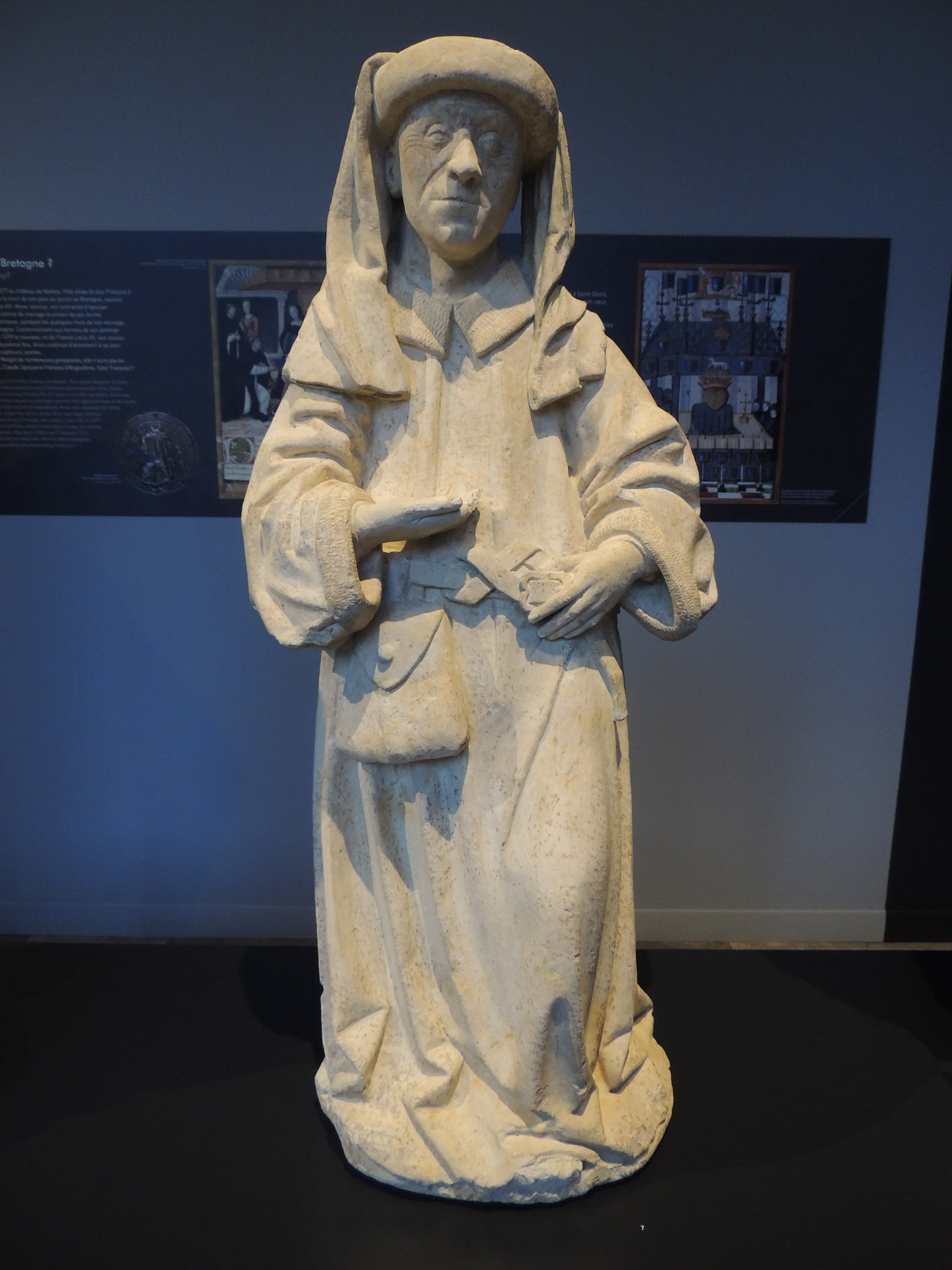
Statue of Saint Matthew (?).

Matthew is also depicted as an evangelist, but in this instance, he is shown as a tax collector. He is wearing a tax collector's purse, which is the antithesis of an alms bag, and he is extending his hand to receive money. This was indeed his profession before he met Jesus of Nazareth. The face appears to be a portrait made from a model and is not stylized like that of Saint Mark.

== Notable figures buried in the establishment ==
The following notable individuals were buried in the convent:

- Gilles de Rais (1405–1440) was a companion-in-arms of Joan of Arc and Marshal of France during the Hundred Years' War. He gained notoriety due to the alleged crimes he committed against children. Following his execution, his rank permitted his family to circumvent the customary practice of burning his body, as he had requested in his last will, and instead inter him in the Carmelite chapel.
- Marguerite of Brittany (1443–1469), Duchess of Brittany; the tomb was transferred to Nantes Cathedral in 1817.
- François II of Brittany (1433–1488), Duke of Brittany; the tomb was transferred to Nantes Cathedral in 1817.
- Jean Meschinot (circa 1420–1491), poet.
- Marguerite of Foix (circa 1458–1486), Duchess of Brittany, was buried in 1486 in Nantes Cathedral. In 1507, her remains were transferred to the Carmelite convent by her daughter, Anne of Brittany, to be interred in a tomb with those of her husband, François II of Brittany. This tomb was subsequently transferred to Nantes Cathedral in 1817.
- The heart of Anne of Brittany (1477–1514), Duchess of Brittany and Queen of France; now in the possession of the Thomas-Dobrée departmental museum.
- Pontcallec, Du Couëdic, Montlouis, and Talhouët, were sentenced to death in 1720 for their participation in the Pontcallec conspiracy.
- Gérard Mellier (1674–1729), Mayor of Nantes.

== See also ==
- Carmelites
- Jacobins Convent, Nantes

== Bibliography ==
- de Berranger, Henri (1975). Évocation du vieux Nantes (in French) (2nd ed.). Paris: Les Éditions de Minuit. ISBN 2-7073-0061-6. OCLC 312748431.
- Bois, Paul (1977). Histoire de Nantes, Toulouse. Univers de la France et des pays francophones (in French). Vol. 39. Toulouse: Éditions Privat. ISBN 2-7089-4717-6.
- Durand, Yves (1997). Les Grands carmes de Nantes : un couvent dans la ville : 1318-1790, Rome. Textus et studia historica carmelitana (in French). Vol. 23. Rome: Édition carmelitane. ISBN 88-7288-046-7.
- Guillouët, Jean-Marie (2006). "La sculpture du XVe siècle provenant de l'église du couvent des Carmes à Nantes". Bulletin Monumental (in French). 164 (2): 163–177. doi:10.3406/bulmo.2006.1349.
- Guillouët, Jean-Marie (2008). "Les chantiers de sculpture à Nantes au XVe siècle : transferts et perméabilité". Nantes religieuse, de l'Antiquité chrétienne à nos jours : actes du colloque organisé à l'université de Nantes (19–20 octobre 2006) (PDF). Bulletin de la Société archéologique et historique de Nantes et de la Loire-Atlantique (in French). Département d'histoire et d'archéologie de l'université de Nantes. ISSN 1283-8454. Archived from the original (PDF) on 22 August 2024.
- Pied, Édouard (1906). Notices sur les rues de Nantes (in French). A. Dugas. pp. 53–54.
