= Anne of Brittany's heart jewel case =

Reliquary

- fr: Écrin du cœur d'Anne de Bretagne
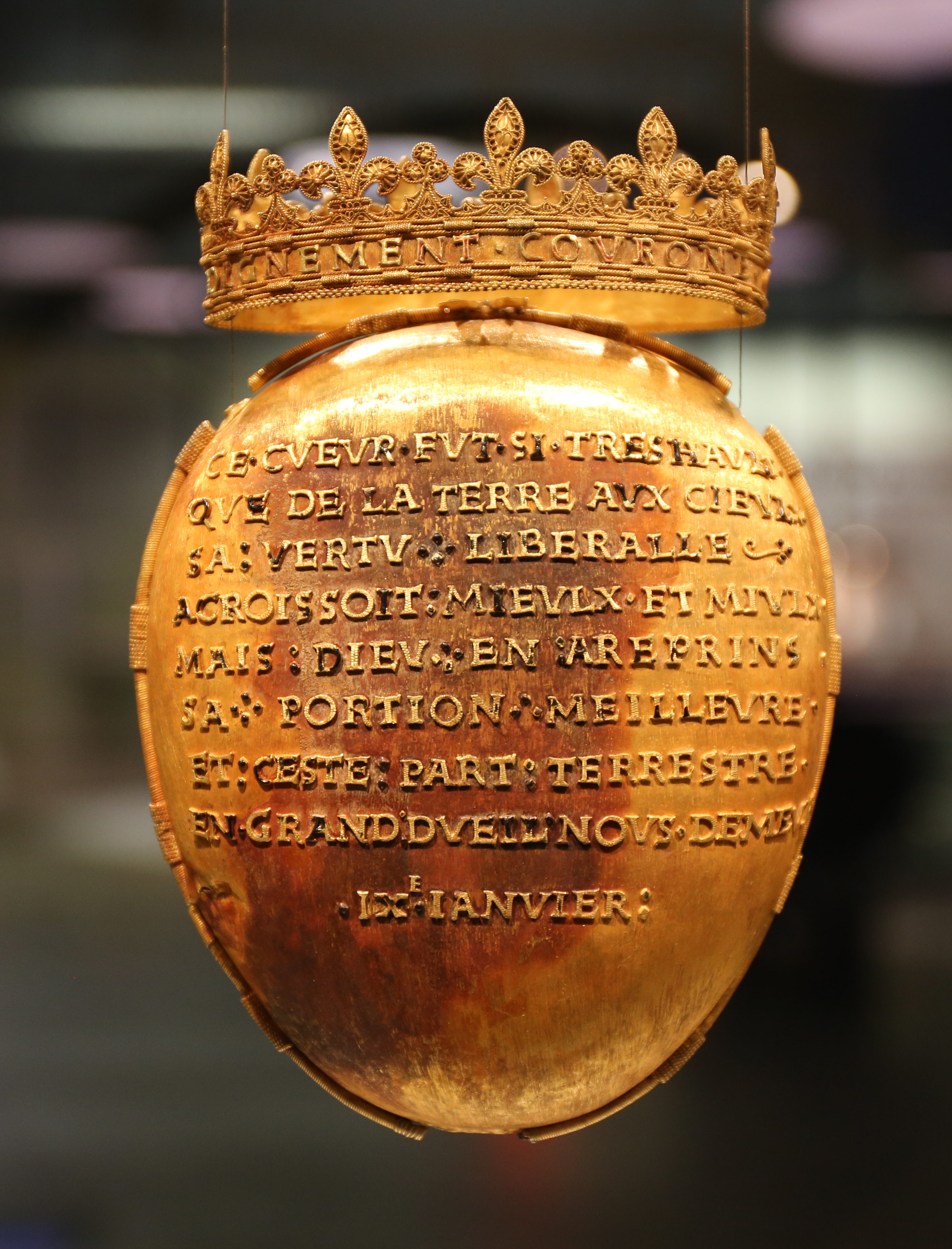
- Reliquary presented at the Musée de Bretagne in 2014.
- Artist: anonymous goldsmith of the court of Blois and perhaps designed by Jean Perréal
- Year: early 16th century
- Catalogue: D. 886-1-1
- Medium: goldsmithing, guilloché, and chasing
- Owner: under court supervision, Nantes (France)

The Anne of Brittany heart jewel case, often referred to as the Anne of Brittany heart reliquary, is a gold funerary object made in the early 16th century to house the heart of Duchess Anne of Brittany (1477-1514), Queen of France. It has been kept at the Musée Départemental Thomas-Dobrée in Nantes since 1896.

Stolen during the night of 13–14 April 2018, the jewel case was found by police on 21 April near Saint-Nazaire and returned to the museum in September of the same year.

== Description ==
The makers of the jewel case are unknown: it may have been designed by Jean Perréal and perhaps executed by an anonymous goldsmith from the court of Blois. However, these are assumptions made in relation to the work carried out for the queen's burial, which is detailed in known archives, unlike the ceremonies for the transfer of her heart. In addition, the absence of a hallmark prevents any attribution.

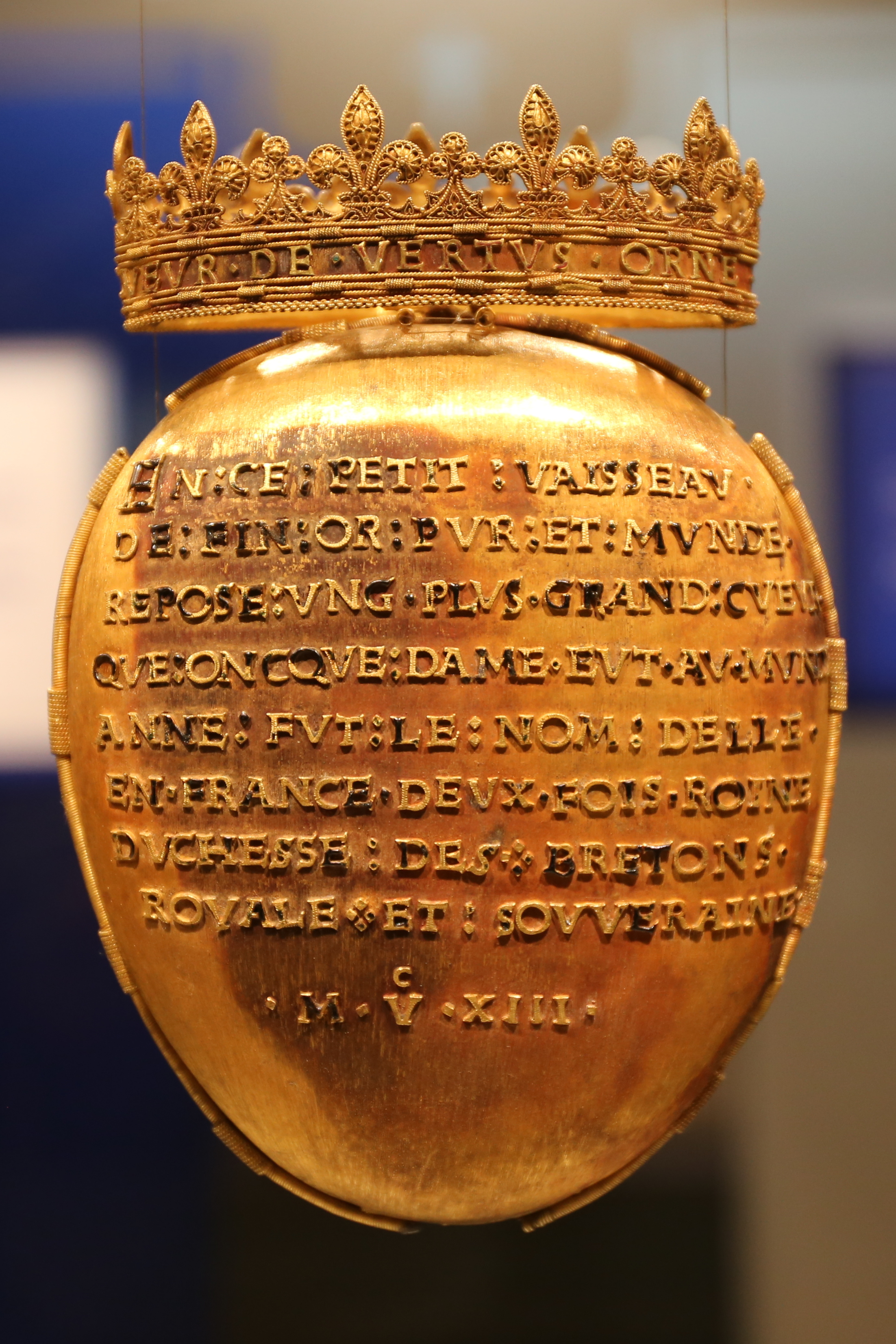
The other side of the cardiotaph. The dark stain is due to the transfer of iron and lead from the metal cans that contained it.

The jewel case (or reliquary) for the heart (known as a cardiotaphe of Duchess Anne of Brittany is an oval, bivalve-shaped box in embossed and guilloché gold plate, hinged by a hinge and edged with a gold chain. It has a satin finish. It is encircled by inscriptions in gold letters enhanced with green, blue and red enamel, in praise of Anne's heart. These inscriptions can be seen on both hulls: (Note: Inside the two white enamel shells (composed of lead glass opacified by tin oxide), the circular inscription appears on the edges: O. CVEVR. CASTE. ET. PUDIQUE. O. IUSTE. ET. BE(NOIST). CVEVR. CVEVR. MAGNANIME. ET. FRANC. DE. ALL. VICE. VAINCQVEVR. CVEVR. DIGNE. BETWEEN. TOVS. DE. COVRONNE. CELESTE. ORE. EST. TON. CLER. SPIRIT. OUT. FROM. PAIN. AND. MOLESTE.)

On one of the outer faces:	On the other:
« En ce petit vaisseau De fin or pur et munde Repose ung plus grand cueur Que oncque dame eut au munde Anne fut le nom delle En France deux fois royne Duchesse des Bretons Royale et Souveraine. M XIII »	« Ce cueur fut si très hault Que de la terre aux cieulx Sa vertu libéralle Accroissoit mieulx et miulx Mais Dieu en a reprins Sa portion meilleure Et ceste part terrestre En grand dueil nous demeur. » IX^{e} Ianvier
On one side of the white enamel inner lining:	On the other side:
« O cueur caste et pudicque O juste et benoît cueur Cueur magnanime et franc De tout vice vainqueur. »	« Cueur digne entre tous De couronne céleste Ore est ton cler esprit Hord de paine et moleste. »

The year shown is in Roman numerals, in abbreviated form. The full entry would be “MCCCCCXIII”, but the “C” above the “V” stands for “five (V) cents (C)”. The year of the Duchess's death has, for several centuries, been established as 1514, but it predates the 1563-1564 calendar reform by Charles IX, before which the year began at Easter, i.e. 16 April in 1514.

Above the jewel case is a clasp in the shape of a dark green enamelled letter “M”. Under the jewel case, a letter in the shape of a Roman “S” would have been present to conceal the lower hinge. Together with the “M” above, these letters would have formed a monogram dedicated to “Mater Salvatoris”, “Mother of the Savior”.

The jewel case is surmounted by a crown, topped by nine fleur-de-lis alternating with nine ermines (sometimes described as shamrocks) adorned with filigree. The crown features the text “cvevr. de. vertvs. orne. dignement. couronne.” (heart of virtue crowned with dignity), whose letters, underlined by seven rows of chains, were enamelled in green and the words separated by a dot in red enamel. The crown conceals the upper clasp.

According to old observations, the crown is suspended above the jewel case by a chain.

It weighs 470 grams.

The set is damaged, probably due to successive manipulations since the first exhumation ordered by Gérard Mellier in 1727. Dark stains, visible on the sides of the jewel case, are due to the transfer of iron and lead from the metal boxes that contained it.

== History ==
=== Death of the queen and transportation of the heart to Nantes ===
Anne of Brittany, Queen of France, is buried in the Basilica of Saint-Denis. The queen had expressed the wish that her heart should rest beside her parents in Nantes. Philippe de Montauban, a faithful advisor, was entrusted with the transfer: he sealed the jewel case and took charge of bringing it back to Nantes.

Coat of arms of Philippe de Montauban

The cardiotaph was placed in three boxes (from the inside out, according to the 1727 description):

- a lead case directly enclosing the jewel case, protected by a cloth scapular;
- then an iron box “in the shape of a bahu”, with an iron handle on top and a lock;
- finally, a sealed lead box with no lock, featuring two lead handles and eight ermines in relief. Above each handle are the arms of Philippe de Montauban.

The set was transported to Nantes with great fanfare. On 19 March 1514, it was placed by Montauban, assisted by Bretaigne, Anne of Brittany's herald, in the tomb of Francis II of Brittany (then in the Carmelite convent at Nantes), on a slate stone between the two coffins of the duchess's parents.

=== Exhumation and exposition ===
In 1727, Gérard Mellier, then mayor of Nantes, had the jewel case exhumed, fearing that the monks had melted the gold. The box was empty, as the heart had probably disintegrated.

On 25 December 1793, in response to an instruction from the National Convention, the reliquary was once again exhumed, emptied and seized as part of the collection of precious metals belonging to the churches, and sent to the Nantes Mint to be melted down. Recognized as a “monument to science and the arts”, it was preserved and transferred to the Cabinet des Médailles of the Bibliothèque nationale de France. On 25 September 1819, it was returned to the Loire-Inférieure departmental museums in Nantes for exhibition, then to the Musée d'archéologie de l'Oratoire from 25 June 1886, and to the Musée Dobrée from 18 April 1896.

Because of its fragility and heritage value, it is rarely loaned out. A police escort accompanied it when it was loaned to the Château des ducs de Bretagne in 2007 for an exhibition entitled Anne de Bretagne, une Histoire, un mythe. To mark the 500th anniversary of Anne of Brittany's death in 2014, the Musée Dobrée organized the exhibition “Le cœur d'Anne de Bretagne” at the Château de Châteaubriant. For the same occasion, the jewel case is loaned to the Château of Blois, the Château of Nantes and the Museum of Brittany in Rennes. Also on this occasion, the jewel case was digitized in 3D and analyzed by X-ray fluorescence spectrometry at the Archeosciences laboratory of University of Rennes. This analysis revealed that the two shells were almost 90% gold, the letters 85%, the cordelière 85% and its knots 80%, with silver and copper completing the alloy to reduce the object's malleability.

A faithful replica of this jewel case was made in 1991 by a German jeweller, Jürgen Abeler (1933-2010), from Wuppertal. It was acquired by the Musée du Château des Ducs de Bretagne, which also lends it out for exhibitions. The work was created for the exhibition La Bretagne au temps des ducs, held at Daoulas Abbey (Finistère) from 15 June 1991 to 6 October 1991.

The original jewel case had been insured in the past at a cost of five million euros.

=== Theft ===
The jewel case was stolen during the night of Friday 13 April to Saturday 14 April 2018 from the Museum Dobrée, where it was on display in the Voltaire building as part of an exhibition entitled “Voyage dans les collections”.

According to video footage and information supplied by investigators, the theft was committed by four individuals wearing helmets who broke into the museum. The alarm sounded at around 3:30 am. A security company was dispatched to the site but did not notice anything out of the ordinary. According to the daily newspaper Ouest-France, a guard was present the night the reliquary was stolen. The theft was discovered when the museum employees took up their duties at 9 a.m., and was not reported to the authorities until around 11:30 a.m. A gilded Hindu statue dating from the late 19th or early 20th century was also stolen, as well as some 50 medieval gold coins of the kings of France and the dukes of Brittany, including a copy of Anne of Brittany's cadiere. Details of the stolen works have been posted online by the Musée Dobrée.

The security of the Musée Dobrée was immediately called into question, including by the “Association Historique du Pays de Campbon”. Faced with this criticism, the museum's director, Julie Pellegrin, stated that her mission was not to keep the cardiotaph in a safe but to exhibit it. Appeals were made to the holders of the jewel case to dissuade them from melting it down to recover its gold.

On 20 April 2018, three men were taken into custody on the premises of the Nantes judicial police and were due to be presented to an examining magistrate the following morning, with a view to a possible indictment. Aged 23 and 25 and originally from the department - one was arrested in Saint-Nazaire, while the other, already known to the law for theft, presented himself to the police - these two suspects do not appear to be part of an organized group, accustomed to this type of operation. Investigators are now focusing on ordinary crime. The third suspect, a minor, has been released.

The reliquary and other stolen objects were found by police on 21 April, “apparently in good condition” according to the Nantes public prosecutor, buried in a wooded area of Saint-Marc-sur-Mer in the commune of Saint-Nazaire.

After three weeks in custody, one of the two suspects, who helped recover the stolen items, was released on 14 May 2018 and placed under house arrest at his home under an electronic anklet. But since 4 July, he has been imprisoned once again in La Roche-sur-Yon, for violating the conditions of his house arrest.

The reliquary was returned to the Musée Dobrée at the end of September 2018. The museum curator reports that it is “in good condition”. However, the reliquary will be entrusted to a restoration company. Its presentation in the museum was scheduled for 2022, after the restoration of the building.

== Controversy over ownership of the reliquary ==
The theft of the jewel case rekindled a dispute that began in 2007 over the ownership of the precious object. Based on a legal study commissioned by the city of Nantes in 2006, Alain Croix, professor of modern history, and Jean-Louis Jossic, former deputy mayor of Nantes, argued that the precious reliquary belonged to the commune of Nantes and not to the Loire-Atlantique departmental council. Nevertheless, the jewel case was finally returned to the Musée Dobrée, its last owner, in September 2018.

== See also ==
- Anne of Brittany
- Tomb of Francis II, Duke of Brittany
- Nantes

== Bibliography ==
- Barthet, Laure; Broucke, Camille, eds. (2014). Le cœur d'Anne de Bretagne [The heart of Anne of Brittany] (in French). Milan: Silvana Editoriale. ISBN 978-88-366-2847-6.
- Girault, Pierre-Gilles (2014). Les funérailles d'Anne de Bretagne, reine de France : l'hermine regrettée [The funeral of Anne of Brittany, Queen of France: the mourned ermine] (in French). Montreuil: Gourcuff-Gradenigo. ISBN 978-2-35340-175-8.
- Leguay, Jean-Pierre (2006). "Un acte de foi et de fidélité post mortem : l'inhumation du cœur de la duchesse Anne, reine de France, dans sa bonne ville de Nantes en 1514" [An act of faith and loyalty post mortem: the burial of the heart of Duchess Anne, Queen of France, in her beloved city of Nantes in 1514]. In Thélamon, Françoise; Boudon, Jacques-Olivier (eds.). Les Chrétiens dans la ville [Christians in the city] (in French). Mont-Saint-Aignan: Presses universitaires de Rouen et du Havre. ISBN 979-10-240-1036-6.
