= Emmanuel Debarre =

French sculptor (1948–2020)

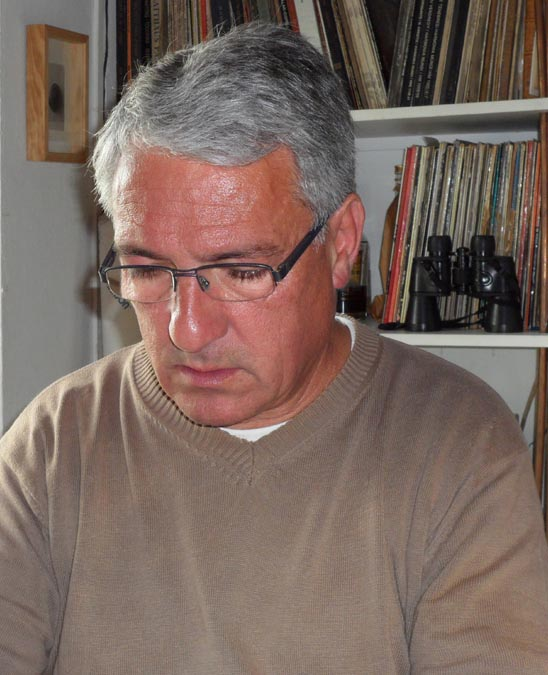
- Born: 9 November 1948; Les Sables-d'Olonne, France
- Died: 28 February 2020 (aged 71); La Roche-sur-Yon, France
- Occupation: Sculptor

Emmanuel Debarre (9 November 1948 – 28 February 2020) was a French sculptor. He focused mostly on abstract art.

== Biography ==
In 1965, Debarre decided to devote his life to sculpture and drawing after a meeting with Alberto Giacometti. He studied mathematics at the Lycée Georges Clemenceau in Nantes. After graduation, Debarre moved to Nice and first studied primary colors. He then relocated to Paris in 1973 and began a series of blue monochromes, which he exhibited the following year at the Museum of the Holy Cross Abbey in Les Sables-d'Olonne. At this exhibition, Italian sculptor Antonino Virduzzo invited Debarre to one of his workshops in Rome.

Debarre primarily used black marble from Belgium and blue granite from Brazil for his sculptures. He also worked with a contemporary material, called altuglas.

== Permanent sculptures ==
Debarre erected the bronze statue at the location of the film Les Vacances de Monsieur Hulot in Saint-Marc-sur-Mer.

- Répons, Larvik, Norway (1987)
- Répons, Angers, France (1989)
