= Rue des Carmes (Nantes) =

French street

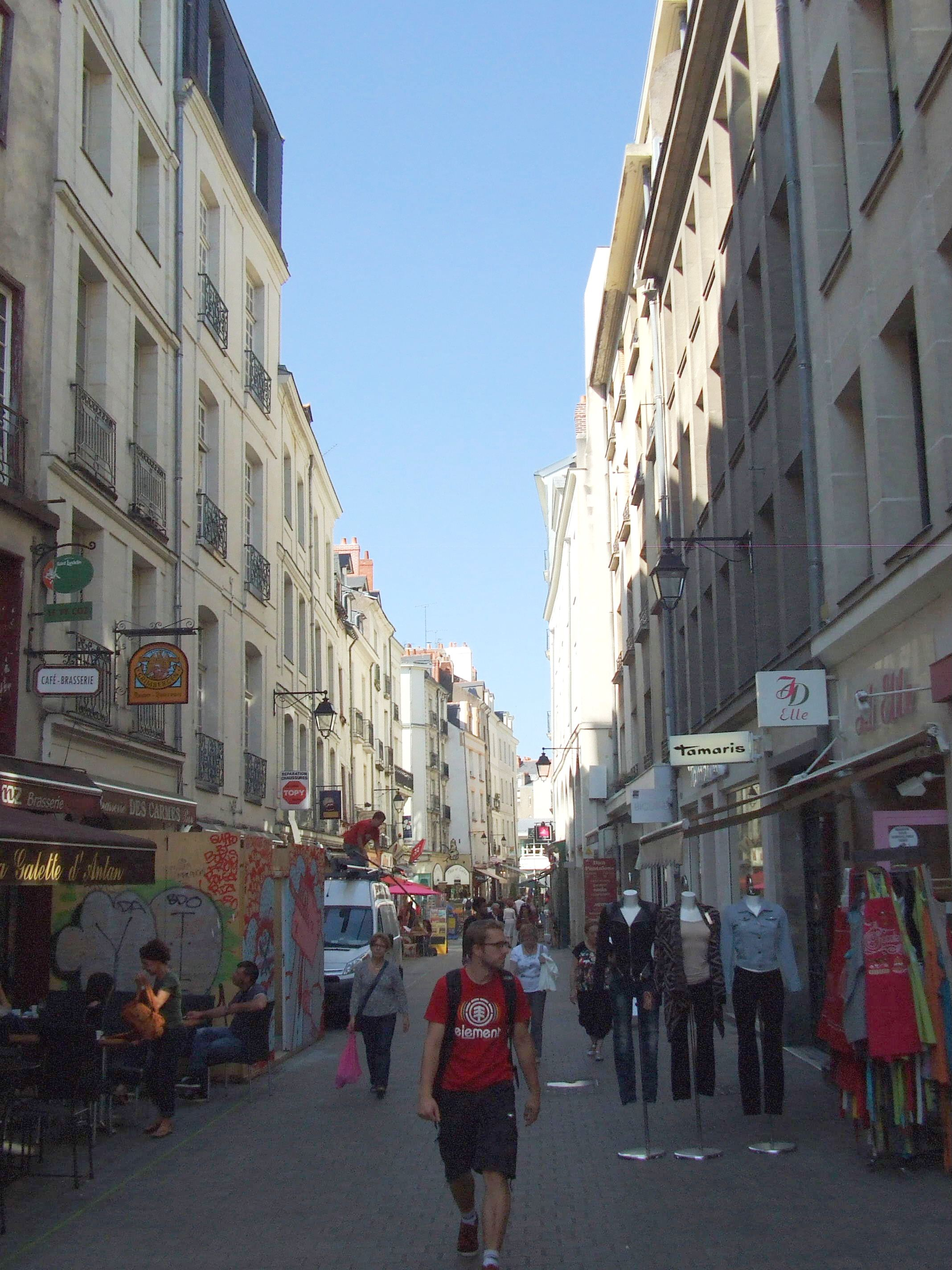
- Rue des Carmes seen from its southern end.
- Interactive map of Rue des Carmes
- Former name(s): Rue de l'Échellerie; Rue Fontenelle
- Type: Street
- Quarter: Bouffay (Centre-ville)
- Coordinates: 47°12′58″N 1°33′19″W

Rue des Carmes is a pedestrian street in Nantes, France.

== Location and access ==
Located in the Bouffay district, in the city center of Nantes, it extends from Rue Saint-Léonard and ends at Place du Change.

== Name ==
It is named in memory of the Carmelite religious order, who owned a convent on this street.

== History ==
During the construction of the Gallo-Roman walls surrounding the city of the Namnètes, the Erdre River had a wider bed than it does today. The area corresponding to the present-day Rue des Carmes marked the eastern limit of the river.

Over time, the city gradually expanded beyond its walls. In the 11th century, a moat was excavated at the base of the walls to enhance the defensive system, although certain parts of the city remained unprotected, including Rue de l'Échellerie, the Place du Change, the river port, and the Bourgneuf district on the right bank of the Erdre (now the Saint-Nicolas district). In the 13th century, Peter Mauclerc initiated the construction of new walls that accommodated the city’s expansion.

The Carmelite order was established around 1318 by Thibaut de Rochefort, Viscount of Donges, in the Hôtel de Rochefort. Around 1325, the order relocated to a building at the corner of Rue des Carmes. Their church, with an apse facing Rue du Moulin, was rebuilt between 1365 and 1372, and the convent was reconstructed between 1369 and 1384. The complex was later expanded after 1420 through the patronage of John V and rebuilt in 1622. The Estates of Brittany were held at the convent in 1636 and 1638.

The Dukes of Brittany maintained close ties with the convent, including Jean V, François II, and Duchess Anne. The tomb of François II of Brittany was initially placed in the Carmelite chapel before being moved to the cathedral. The convent also contained the tombs of Gilles de Rais and Gérard Mellier, as well as the reliquary of the heart of Anne of Brittany.

The street was originally called Rue de l'Échellerie, extending from Port Communeau to Place des Changes, a name derived from the nearby former Porte de l'Échellerie. It later became Rue des Carmes and was temporarily renamed Rue Fontenelle during the French Revolution before reverting to its previous name. It is distinct from Rue des Carmélites in the Château district.

The Carmelite community was dispersed in 1791, and the convent’s furniture, from which valuable objects had been removed, was sold. In 1792, the purchaser of the church proposed demolishing the nave and requested the removal of the organs, tombs, and statues. In 1802, the nave was converted into the Variétés Theatre, managed successively by Veuve Charles and Company, then Ferville and Potier. By the early 20th century, only a few arches and well-preserved vaults remained, visible at No. 3 Rue des Bons-Français and at Nos. 16 and 18 Rue des Carmes.

== Buildings and places ==
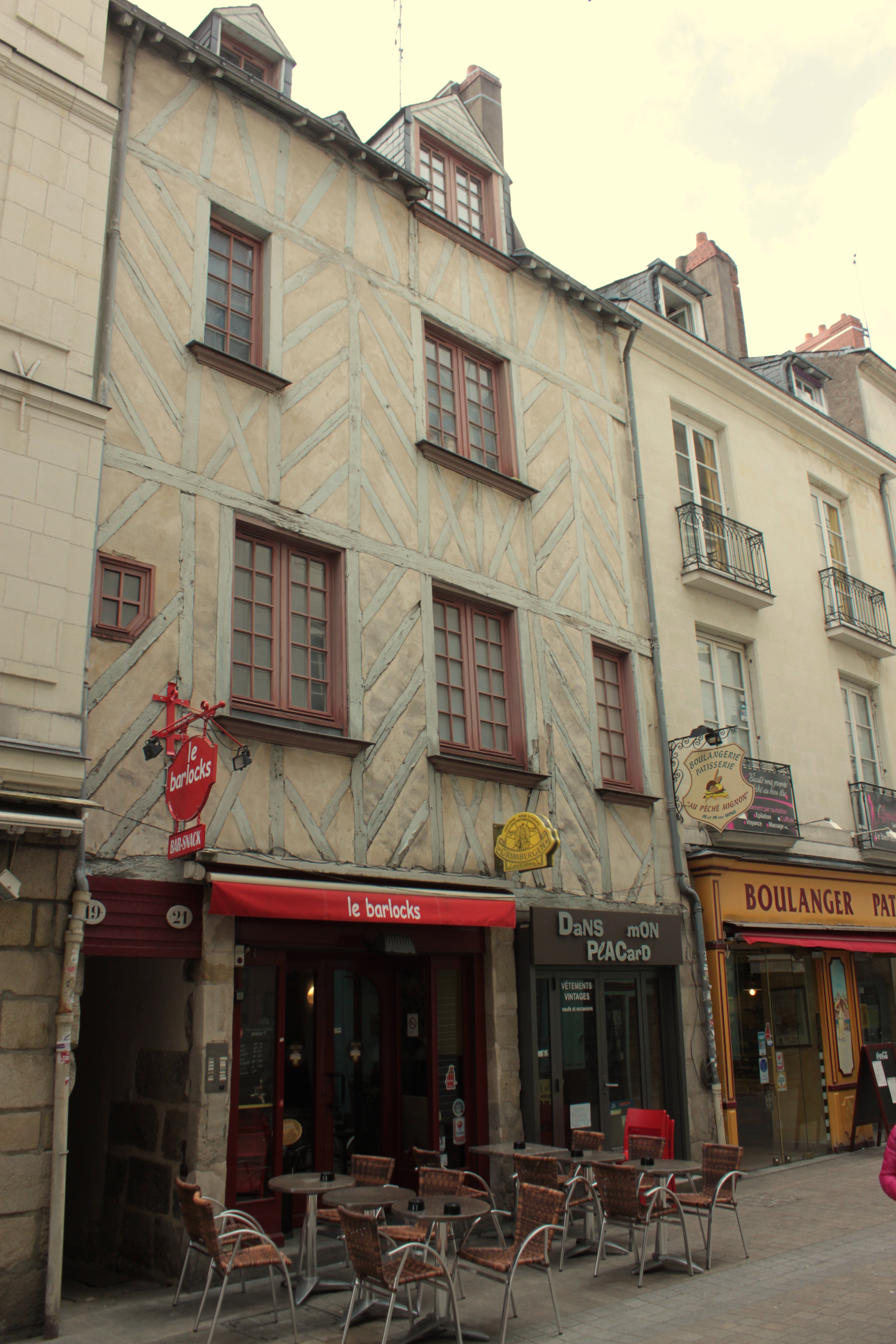
A half-timbered house at No. 19.

- Near Place des Changes, the first known printing press in Nantes operated in 1493 under Étienne Larcher, who published Les Lunettes des Princes.
- The building at No. 2, located at the southern end of the street opening onto Place du Change, dates from the 15th century and is one of the city’s finest half-timbered houses. Historically known as the House of the Apothecaries or the House of the Exchange, it was classified as a historic monument on January 4, 1922. The building has housed the tourist office, a restaurant, and later a café-exhibition space and an association venue.
- At No. 15 was the Cour Gaillard. At the end of a corridor in the second section of this courtyard, which connected with Rue des Halles, Édouard Pied recorded in 1906 a wooden statue embedded in the wall of an old house. Covered with whitewash, the statue represented the Virgin and was known as Notre-Dame-de-la-Délivrance. According to local tradition, the statue was particularly venerated by women in certain life circumstances, notably for successful childbirth. As of 1906, small remnants of burnt wax were often visible around the pedestal supporting it. The statue is believed to be a reproduction of another noted as early as the 16th century. After the destruction of World War II, the buildings along the south side of Cour Gaillard were rebuilt, and Rue des Halles was widened; the courtyard may have been altered since Édouard Pied’s observations.
- Other courtyards existed at the beginning of the 20th century at Nos. 19, 23, and 25 of this street.

== See also ==
- Carmelite convent, Nantes

== Bibliography ==
- de Berranger, Henri (1975). Évocation du vieux Nantes [Evocation of old Nantes] (in French) (2nd ed.). Paris: Les Éditions de Minuit. ISBN 2-7073-0061-6. OCLC 312748431.
- Pied, Édouard (1906). Notices sur les rues de Nantes [Information about the streets of Nantes] (in French). A. Dugas.
