= Cordeliers Cloister (Saint-Emilion) =

Cloister located in Gironde, France

Coordinates: 44.8939°N 0.1567°W

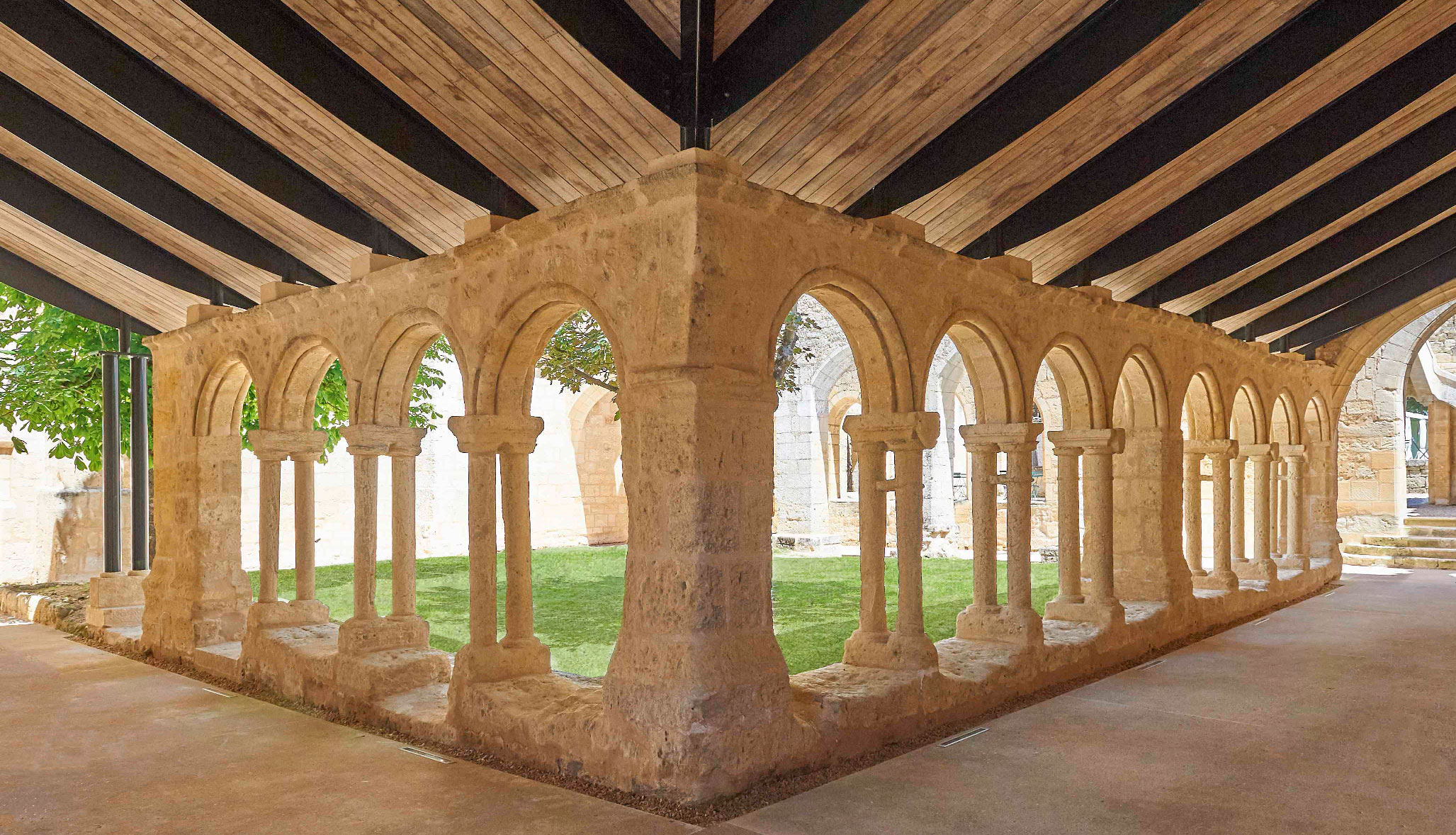
The Cordeliers cloister

The Cloître des Cordeliers is located in the heart of the medieval town of Saint-Émilion, in Gironde (France). It is one of the city’s most iconic and picturesque landmarks, along with the monolithic church. Listed as a historical monument and recognized as a UNESCO World Heritage Site, the site also houses underground cellars where sparkling wines are crafted.

== History ==
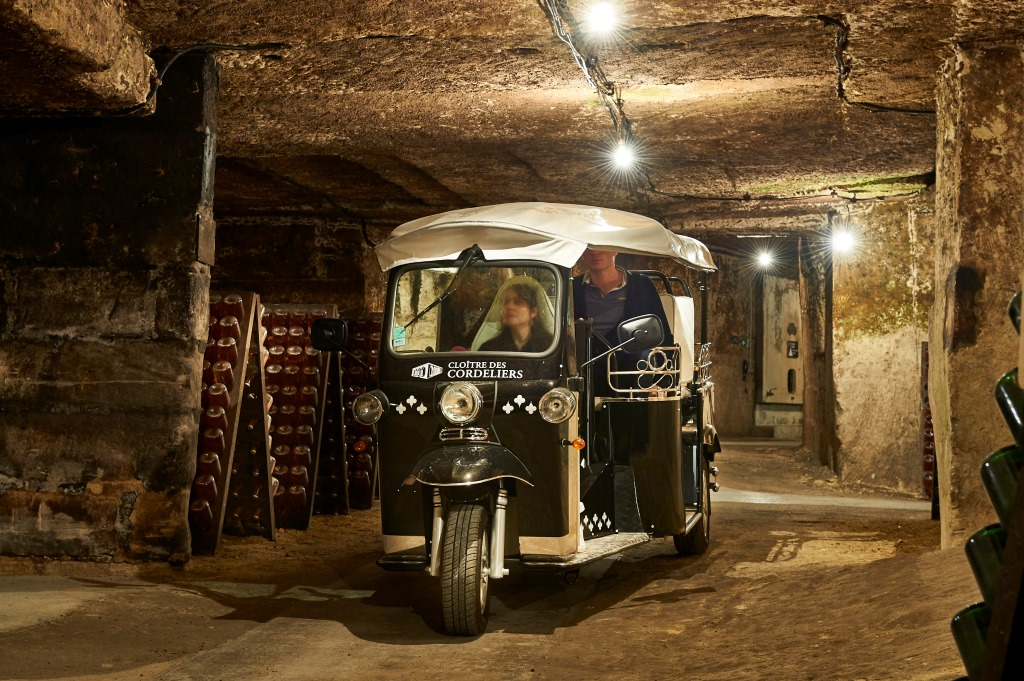
Underground cellars

=== The Cordeliers before their arrival at the cloister ===
The name “Cordeliers” comes from the site’s original occupants, the Cordeliers, Franciscan friars who followed the precepts developed by Francis of Assisi in 1210. They were given this name by Jean de Beauffort during the Seventh Crusade, due to their garments made of thick brown or grey cloth, tied with a rope belt. Before settling in the current cloister, the Cordeliers monks most likely resided in the area known as “Les Menuts,” outside the town walls. Prior to the advent of mechanical plowing, remains of the old Cordeliers church could still be found on the land now occupied by the Clos des Menuts. In Gascon, the word “menut” means “small” or “detail.” At that time, it was also a nickname commonly given to the Cordeliers.

=== The 14th century: Construction ===
In the 14th century numerous battles between the Kings of France and the Dukes of Aquitaine brought unrest to the region. The monastery was pillaged in 1337 during clashes between the Lords of Guyenne and the Counts of Eu and Guinness. To protect themselves against future attacks, the Cordeliers asked to move within the Saint-Émilion walls. They were granted permission in 1338 and immediately began construction work on their chapel. In 1343 they obtained permission from the Pope to establish their monastery within the town, prompting construction of the cloister and part of the monastery building. A few years later the Cordeliers undertook work to convert the chapel into a church, which is still visible today. The rest of the buildings were enclosed inside the walls. In 1383 the King of England finally gave the monks a plot of building land right next to their old home but this time on the right side of the wall.

=== The French Revolution: Abandonment ===
The Cordeliers occupied these sites for the four centuries leading up to the French Revolution in 1789. During this period the monastery consisted of a church, an entrance courtyard, a winery, a vat room, a cellar, a garden and a dormitory building with six bedrooms. The revolution threw the life of the cloister into turmoil and the order was banned. All 284 monasteries occupied by the Cordeliers monks in France were closed down. The building became national property and its occupants were dispersed. The Cordeliers order was finally authorised again in 1850, but no-one came to claim the Saint-Émilion monastery. The cloister was then left abandoned and nature took its course. Ivy invaded the alleyways and climbed over the buildings. The spot became a favourite haunt for lovers, eccentrics, romantics and even goths. In the 19th century the writer Maurice Graterrole described the unusual ambience of the location:

"A heavy, almost frightening silence weights on its pious ruins, now home only to night owls. These crumbling walls, these broken and mossy stones, this fickle and wild vegetation forming a dome above the cloister which is almost impenetrable to sunlight all gradually grip your heart despite itself and you are seized with such melancholy sadness, as if you were suddenly transported into the solitude so mournfully sung by the prophet of the Lamentations. And yet, an infinite poetry lies behind it all!"

=== Today: Winery ===
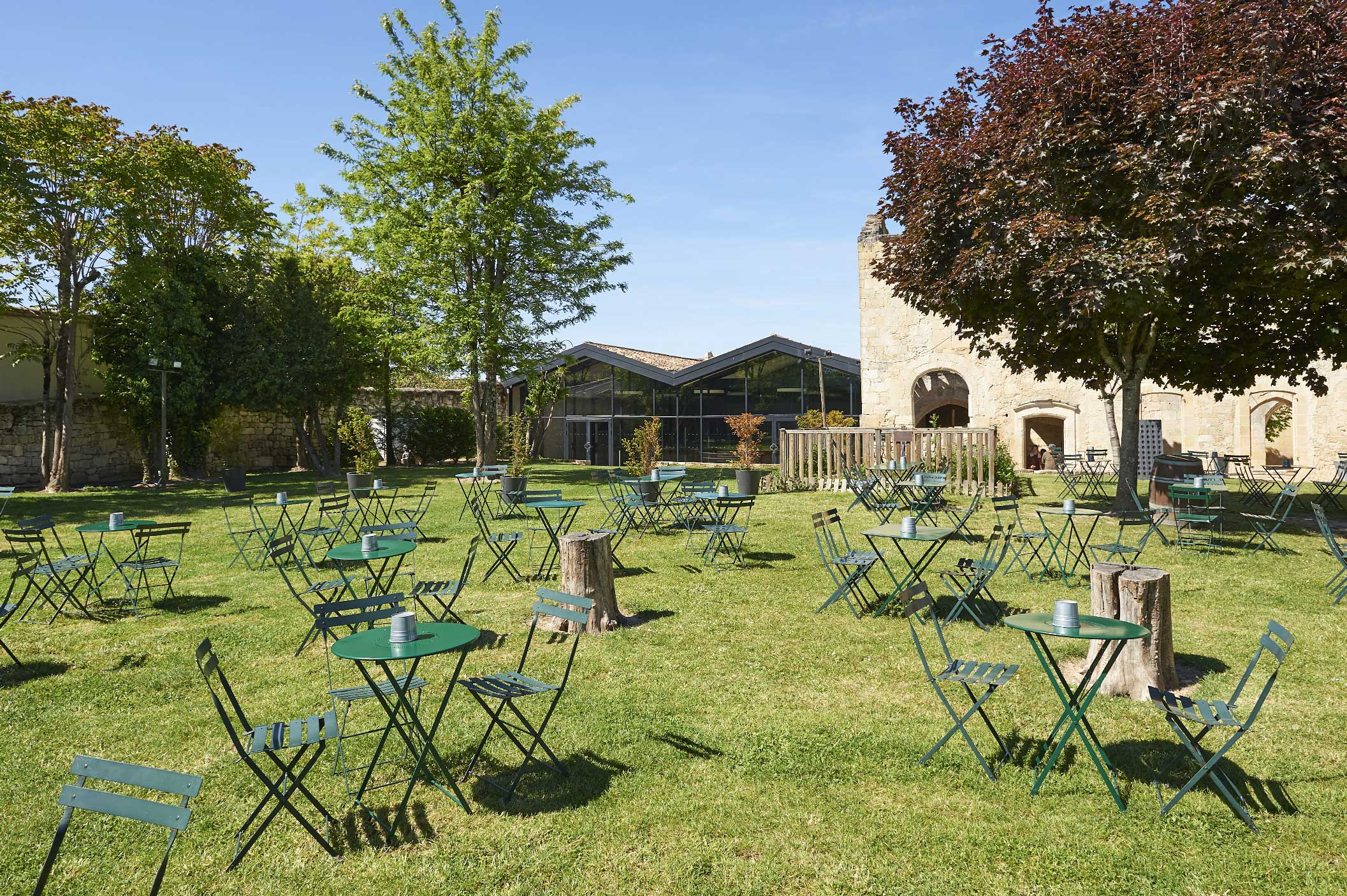
Jardin du Cloître des Cordeliers

In the late 19th century the new owners had idea of using the basements and underground cellars to make and age sparkling wines under the name ‘MM.G.MEYNOT et Compagnie’. Since then various owners have come and gone, each adding their own ideas and expertise and drawing on many years of Cordeliers history. This tradition is still continued today in the manufacture of a legendary sparkling wine.

The Cordeliers cloister has a network of cellars and tunnels stretching for three kilometres beneath the village of Saint-Émilion. The constant temperature of 12 °C and total darkness they provide ensure perfect conditions for fermenting wines. Les Cordeliers produce around ten different white and rosé sparkling wines, both brut and demi-sec. They are made from the most famous grape varieties of the Bordeaux region including Merlot, Sémillon, Cabernet Franc and Sauvignon.

== In popular culture ==
The cloister's existence has been punctuated with periods of slaughter and of peace, making it a place charged with history. This resulted in appearances in the art and culture of various different periods, giving the Cordeliers cloister a firm place in the imagination. For example, in 1839 the cloister’s decoration was reproduced at the Opéra de Paris for a production of 'Robert le Diable' by Giacomo Meyerbeer. Pierre Gaspard-Huit also came to the cloister to film scenes for his film La mariée était trop belle with Brigitte Bardot and Micheline Presle.

== Architecture ==
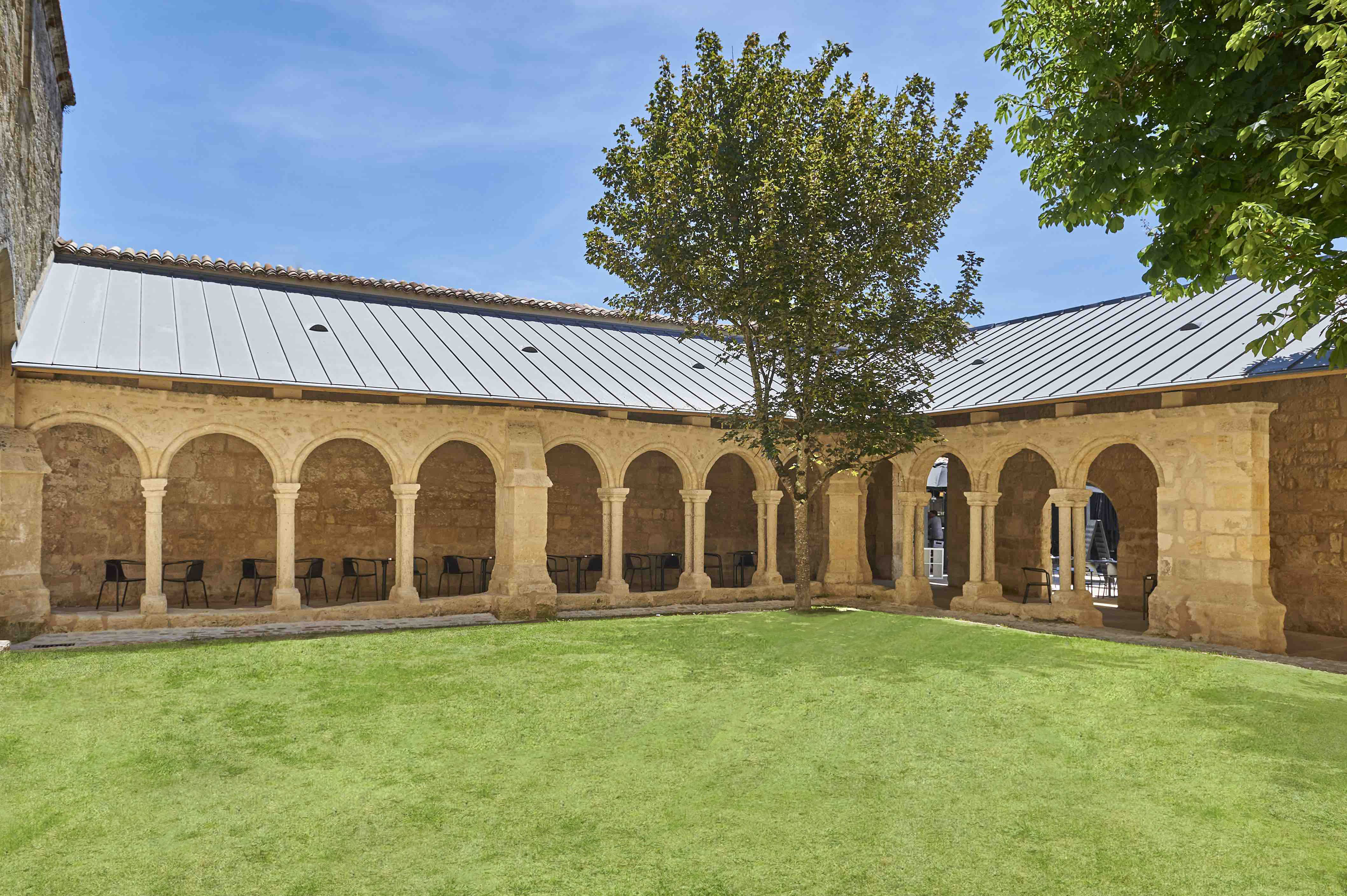
The Romanesque architectural style of the Cloître des Cordeliers.

Cordeliers Cloister

The cloister was made from limestone which is prevalent in the Saint-Émilion area. Its architecture is Romanesque in style, rubbing shoulders with the old Gothic-style chapel and church. Its columns are monolithic, in other words cut from a single stone from the base to the capital. Small crests are hidden in the abacuses. The Romanesque rounded arches were built in the 14th century and stand near additional Gothic pointed arches in the background. Other visible elements include a small tower which is the remains of the church tower, a very simple sweeping arc spanning the church from one wall to the other, columns without capitals, and windows.

== See also ==
- Cremant
