= Saint-Marc-sur-Mer =

- Town
- Location within France
- Coordinates: 47.240055°N 2.2783327°W
- Country: France
- Region: Pays de la Loire
- Department: Loire-Atlantique
- Arrondissement: Saint-Nazaire
- Commune: Saint-Nazaire

Saint-Marc-sur-Mer is a seaside resort in France, situated in the commune of Saint-Nazaire (principal place of the arrondissement of Saint-Nazaire, in the department of Loire-Atlantique, region of Pays de la Loire). It is located 6 kilometres (3.7 mi) to the west of the center of the town of Saint-Nazaire, of which it is a district. Originally named Crépelet, at the end of the 19th century it was given the name of the saint to whom its chapel was dedicated.

== The birthplace of "Monsieur Hulot" ==
From the summer to autumn of 1951, the town's beach was the filming location for the exterior scenes of Jacques Tati's comedic film Monsieur Hulot's Holiday. Tati spent weeks searching for a suitable location, and upon discovering Saint-Marc wrote that it was "the little corner I have been dreaming of". The Hôtel de la Plage, which appeared as the holiday residence of the titular Monsieur Hulot, still exists, and was renovated in 2010. Some scenes were shot in studios, notably those set in the hotel's restaurant; but many key scenes were shot on location, such as the tennis match, which took place in the garden of the Château de Saint-Marc, and the beach scenes, at Saint-Marc's beach.

The beach is now known as la Plage de M Hulot ("Monsieur Hulot's Beach"). In 1999, at the request of Tati's daughter, a statue of Tati as Monsieur Hulot by sculptor Emmanuel Debarre was erected on the seafront. It originally included Hulot's signature pipe, which was removed by vandals not long after its unveiling.

== Coastline and beaches ==
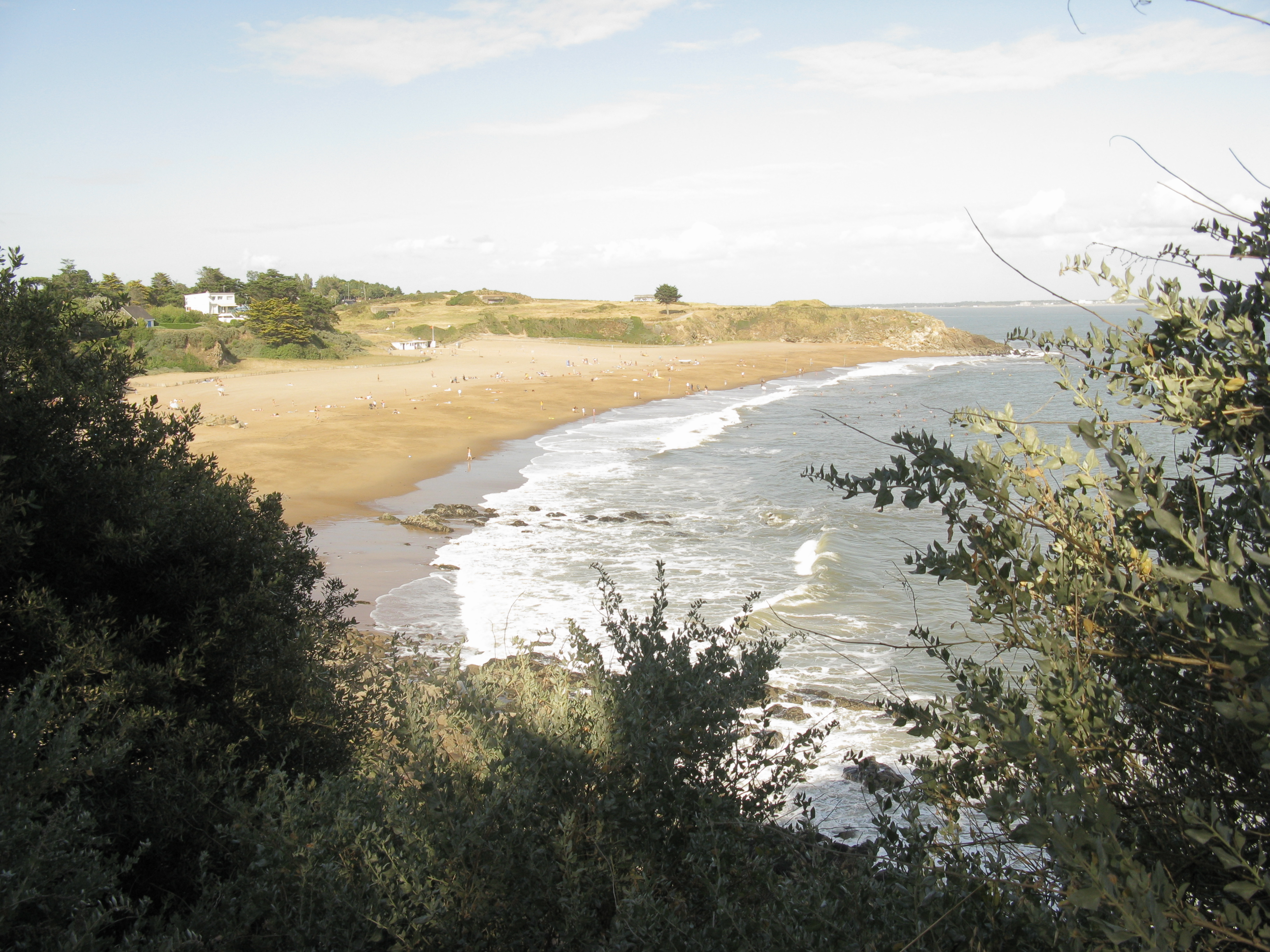
The Plage de la Courance.

From the Pointe de l'Ève to the Pointe de la Lande, the boundary between Saint-Nazaire and Pornichet, the coast measures a little more than 3 kilometres (1.9 mi). It has numerous southeast-facing beaches, including:

- the beach of Fort de L'Ève, with a large campsite
- the beach of la Courance (lifeguard-supervised in summer), renowned as a location for bodyboarding and skimboarding
- the beach of Saint-Marc (lifeguard-supervised in summer)
- the beach of Saint-Eugène
- the beach of Grand Traict, known among surfers for its surf spots
- the beach and manor of Géorama
- the beach of the Petite Vallée, partly naturist.

The pointe de Chémoulin, the boundary between the Loire estuary and the Atlantic Ocean, is the site of the Fort de Chemoulin, occupied by the French Navy, who manage Chemoulin's semaphore watchtower and control maritime traffic into the entrance of the estuary. The fort is also a centre régional opérationnel de surveillance et de sauvetage coastal monitoring station.

Beyond Chemoulin, the coast is oriented to the southwest and includes:

- the beach of Jaunais cove, sometimes called Chemoulin cove, well protected from the wind by high cliffs, a naturist beach
- the beach of Jaunais (lifeguard-supervised in summer) is the final beach of Saint-Marc, at the boundary of the town of Pornichet.

== Citations ==
- Davies, Lizzy (6 July 2009). "In search of Monsieur Hulot's holiday". The Guardian.
- "Le château de Saint-Marc". Chroniques de Saint-Nazaire (in French). 17 August 2012.
- "Histoire du Château de Saint Marc sur Mer". Château de Saint-Marc. 2012. Archived from the original on 16 September 2012.

== Bibliography ==
- Stéphane Pajot, Les Vacances de Monsieur Tati: Hulot à Saint-Marc-sur-Mer. Éditions d'Orbestier, Le Château d'Olonne, 2003.
