= Musée Dobrée =

Archeology museum in Nantes, France

Coordinates: 47°12′44″N 1°34′01″W

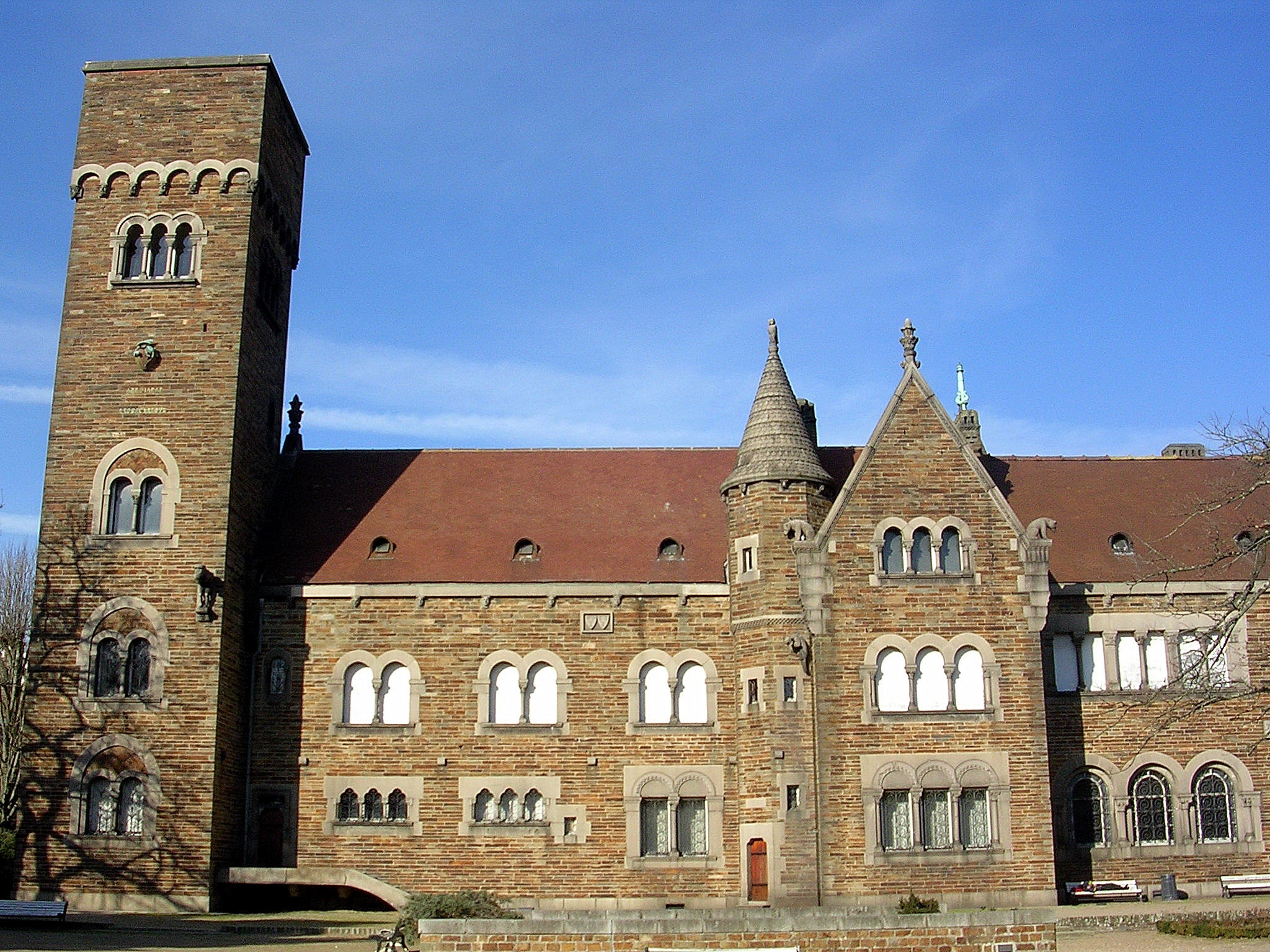
The Musée Dobrée

The Musée Dobrée (Breton: Mirdi Dobrée) is an archeology museum in Nantes, in the quartier Graslin in the immediate outskirts of the city centre and very close to the city's Natural History Museum. It was given to the city by Thomas Dobrée (13 August 1810 – 1895) and now belongs to the Conseil général de la Loire-Atlantique. In January 2010, the Conseil général began a project to restructure and modernise the museum, which was completed in 2024.

== The Palais Dobrée ==
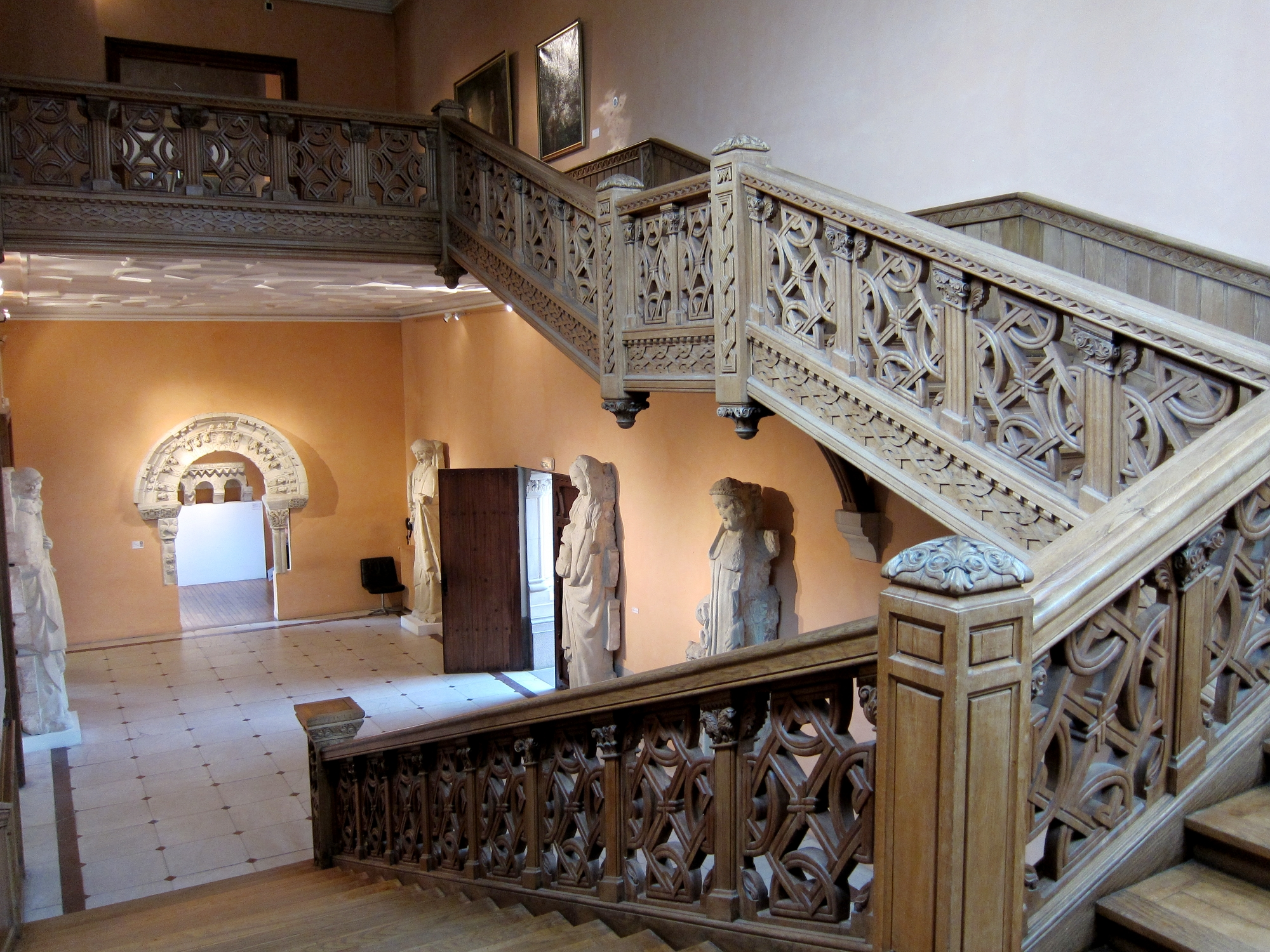
Entrance to the Palais Dobrée

From an old Huguenot family which had originated in Normandy before moving to Guernsey in the 16th century, whose other members became businessmen and arms-bearers in Nantes, Thomas Dobrée found himself with a large fortune at a young age. He then abandoned business aged 28 to collect artworks for 64 years of his life. From 1862, he devoted himself to building his 'palais', to house the over 10,000 objets d'art which he had spent his life collecting. His collections were particularly rich in precious books such as incunables and old Breton printed books, along with miniature paintings on manuscripts, autographs, coins, medals and the other graphic arts (notably German and Dutch engravings). His collection also included important holdings of sculpture, paintings and decorative art objects from the Middle Ages to the end of the 19th century.

Built in the immediate outskirts of the 15th-century manor of John V, Duke of Brittany, the palais Dobrée was in the Romanesque Revival style dear to Viollet-le-Duc, although it was a joint work by the architects Simon, Boismen, Chenantais and Le Diberder, who were constantly troubled by their patron regarding it. Its form was inspired by the designs on the Saint Calminius Reliquary, which was part of the collection. In total Dobrée spent 100,000 francs (254,000 Euros) a year over 34 years, though he never lived there and it was only completed after his death.

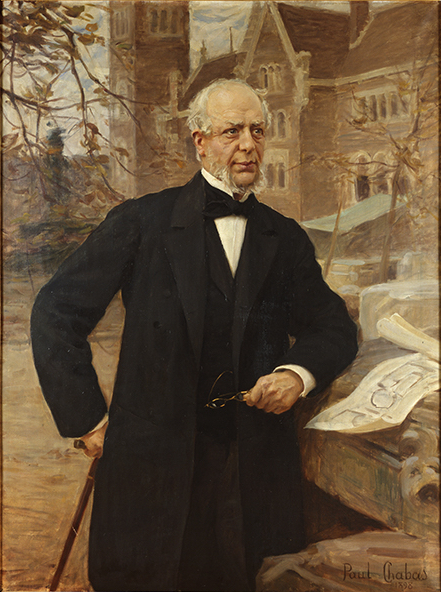
Thomas II Dobrée (1810-1895)

By a deed witnessed by a notary on 8 August 1894, Thomas Dobrée left the palais and his collections to the Département de Loire-Inférieure – the bequest planned that the Départemenat would be able to transfer its archaeological museum into the manoir de la Touche, but stipulated that Dobrée's collections had to be kept separate from the archaeological collections, as is still the case. The conseil général accepted the bequest and decided to name the museum the Musée Thomas Dobrée. In 1896, the archaeological collections were moved in and in 1899, the museum opened its doors to the public. In 1974, an extension was built and a modern building constructed in a corner of the palais' garden – it was there that the old archaeological museum's collections (notably the Egyptian antiquities) were displayed, with the palais itself given over entirely to Dobrée's collection.

== Restoration ==
After restoring and expanding the Nantes Museum of Arts, teams from Bouygues Bâtiment Grand Ouest are currently in charge of restructuring and transforming the Dobrée Museum, in the historic heart of the city of Nantes. The Dobrée museum project reconciles the architectural ambition of a 21st century museum while respecting all of the existing built heritage. Respectful of its history, the project reveals the unique identity of the site, organizes and facilitates circulation in its urban environment, offering a museum on a human scale.

=== First project ===
In January 2010, a project to restructure and modernise the museum was adopted by the Conseil général. The architect Dominique Perrault was selected to carry out the project, which consisted in particular of the construction of new underground exhibition spaces under the gardens, which would house the reception area, educational workshops, a 200-seat auditorium and temporary exhibition rooms (a total of 700 m²). The 4,200 m² of the Palais Dobrée and the 950 m² of the Manoir de la Touche were to be completely renovated and brought up to public access standards. As for the extension built in 1974, in one of the corners of the estate, rue Voltaire, it was planned to partially demolish it, then rebuild it and clad it in a stone similar to that of the historic buildings; this building was to be devoted to conservation and research activities – with the installation of reserves, a museum library and a documentation centre. Finally, the 8,000 m² of gardens were to be reorganised with the creation of a medieval garden, an orchard, and the evocation of a moor, to the detriment of the hundred-year-old listed lime trees. On 16 July 2012, by retaining four of the “seven or eight” technical and legal elements submitted by the Nantes Patrimoine association on the basis of the town planning code, arguments taken up and presented by the public rapporteur, the Administrative Court rejected the project, which had risen from €26 million to €47 million in three years, even though the Conseil général’s website still presents the Perrault project as it stands, since the departmental assembly is considering appealing against this judgement. It became certain that the museum extension project would not be carried out as is in February 2014, when the Nantes Administrative Court of Appeal confirmed the cancellation of the building permit.

=== Second project ===
On 4 July 2017, a second project was selected by the departmental council and presented by a multidisciplinary team made up of architects Jacques Pajot and Marc Iseppi (from the Parisian firm Atelier Novembre), landscape architect Pierre Sarrien and scenographer Adeline Rispal (Studio Adeline Rispal). It plans to retain the three existing buildings, each of which will have its own function: the Voltaire building, which houses the archaeology museum, will be upgraded to accommodate the main public reception area, as well as a shop, educational rooms and a restaurant; the Palais Dobrée will be dedicated to the permanent collections; the Touche manor will house temporary exhibitions. A modern extension, made of metal and glass, will be added to the west gable in order to install a lift and staircases, thus keeping the interior of the building intact.

Outside, access to the museum complex will be via a mineral forecourt overlooking Rue Voltaire created in front of the reception building. A sloping ramp will lead visitors to a second space, the “museum garden” located in the centre of the plot. A third green space to the north of the Palais Dobrée, overlooking Rue Montesquieu, will act as a neighbourhood square, offering relaxation areas and games .According to the departmental council’s forecasts, construction could begin in the autumn of 2019, with delivery scheduled for 2021. Its cost is estimated at 25 million euros (including 15 million for the works) compared to the 47 million of the first project.

== The Archaeological Collections ==
As early as the 19th century, members of the Archaeological and Historical Society of Nantes and Loire-Atlantique collected Egyptian, Etruscan and Greek objects. Various donors completed this first collection. The collection was then enriched by deposits from national museums such as the Louvre. Mediterranean archaeology brings together nearly 2,000 pieces and is one of the ten departments that make up the museum’s conservation division. Most of the Egyptian collections come from the collection of the traveller and mineralogist Frédéric Cailliaud (1787–1869) from Nantes. The Greek and Etruscan civilisations are mainly represented by ceramics.The national archaeology department holds more than 25,000 objects, making it one of the richest collections in western France.

== Gallery ==
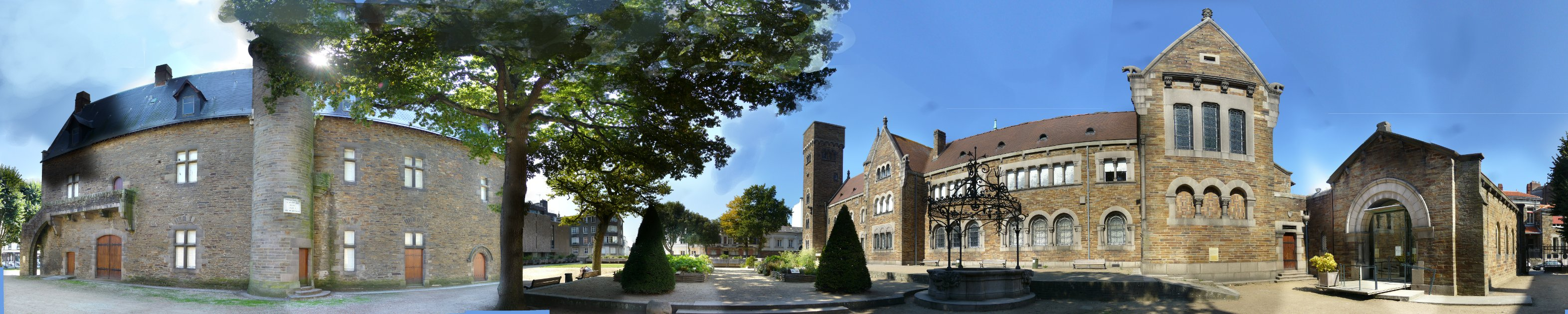
The Manoir Jean V, to the left, and the Musée Dobrée, to the right.

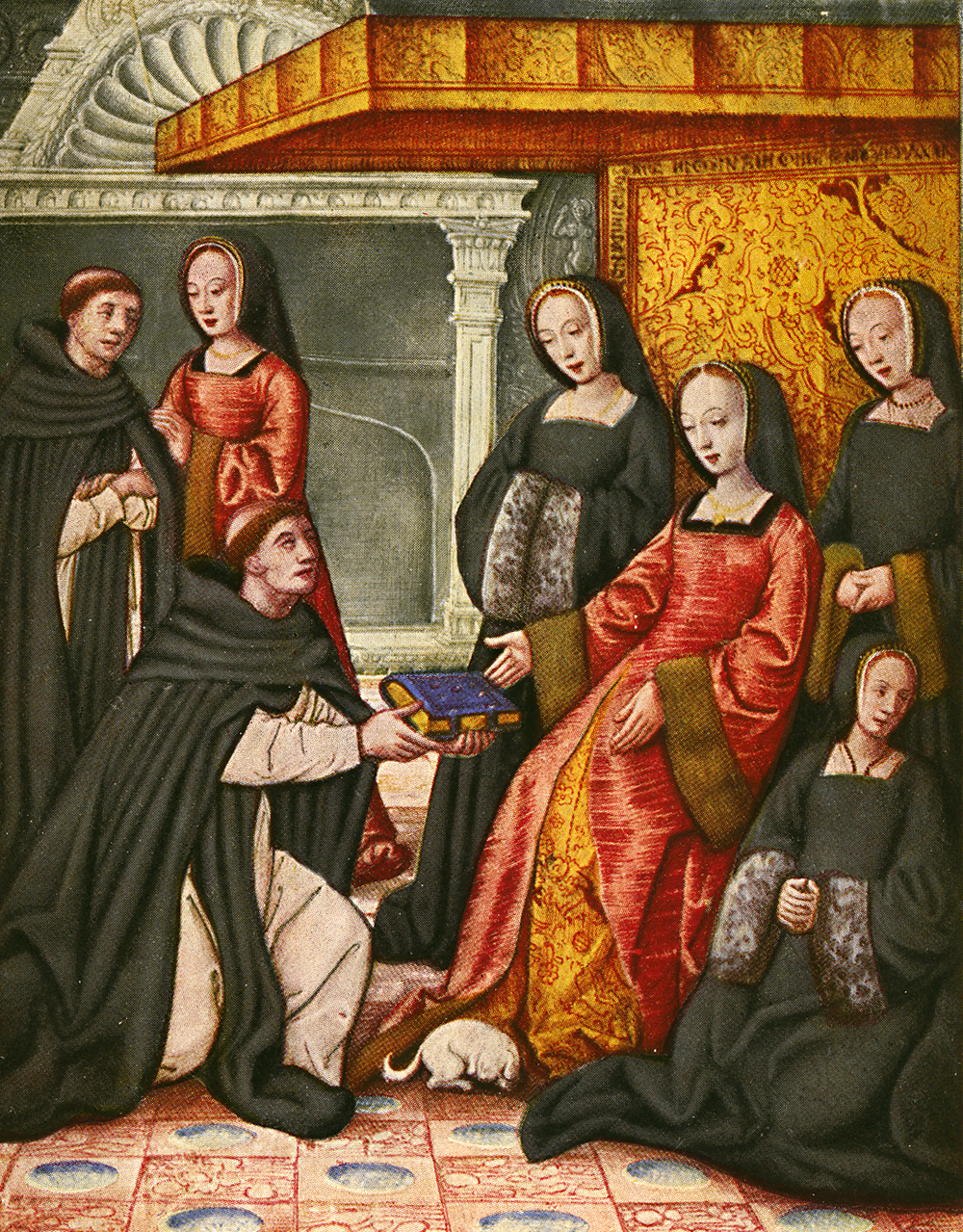
Anne of Brittany

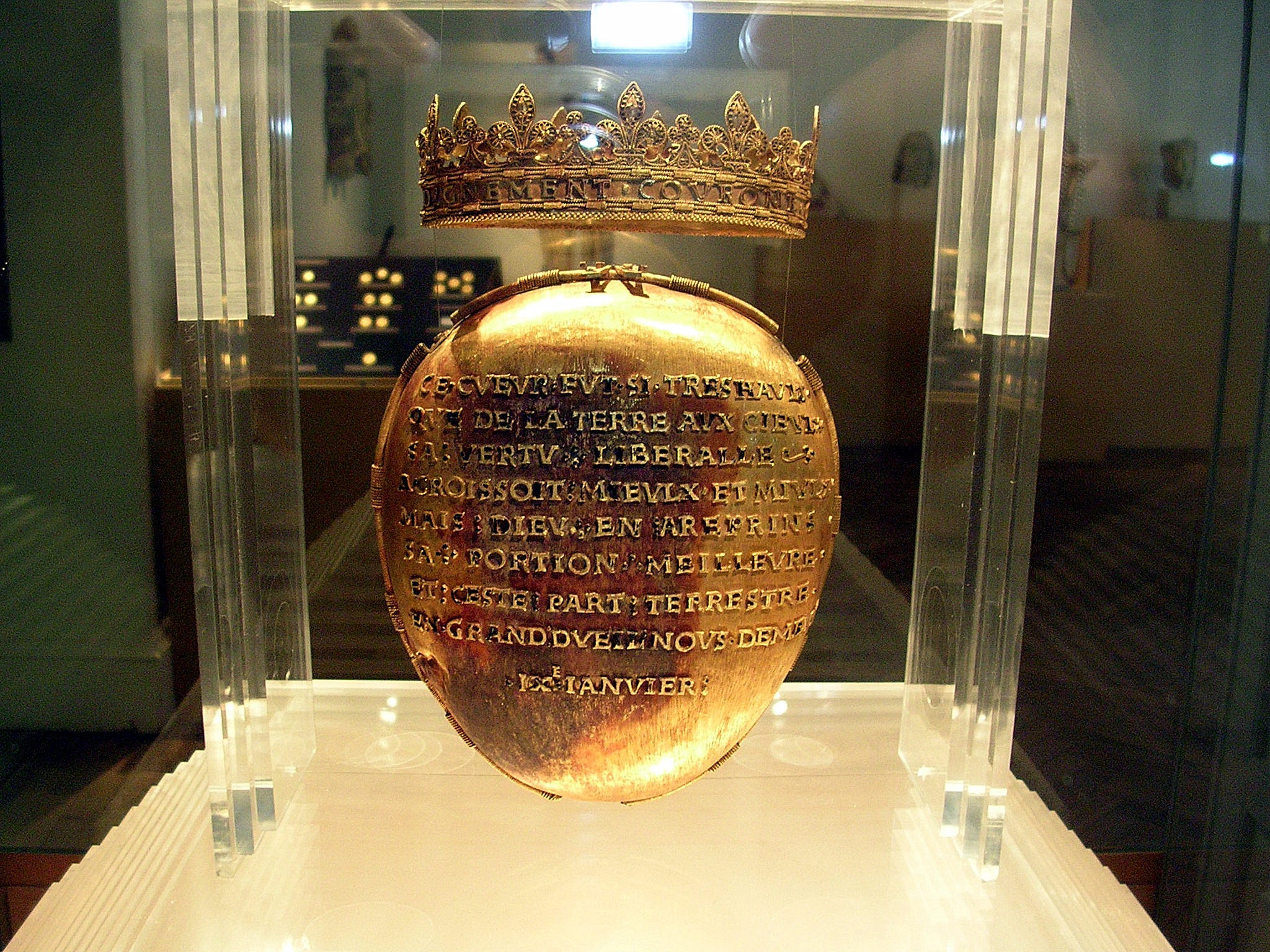
Anne's heart

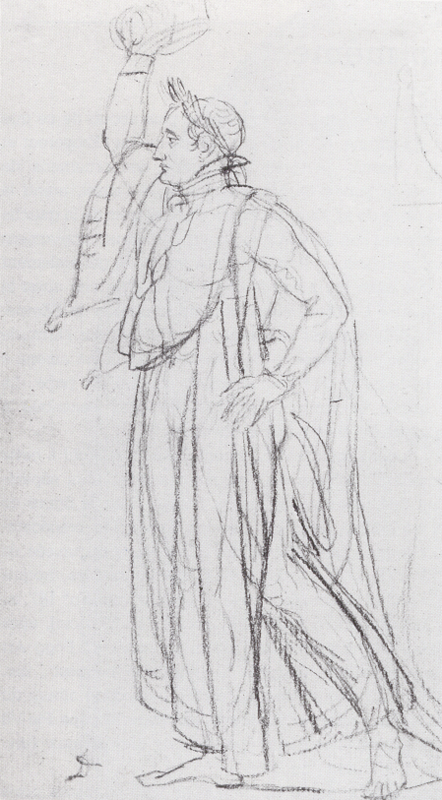
Study for Napoleon's Coronation

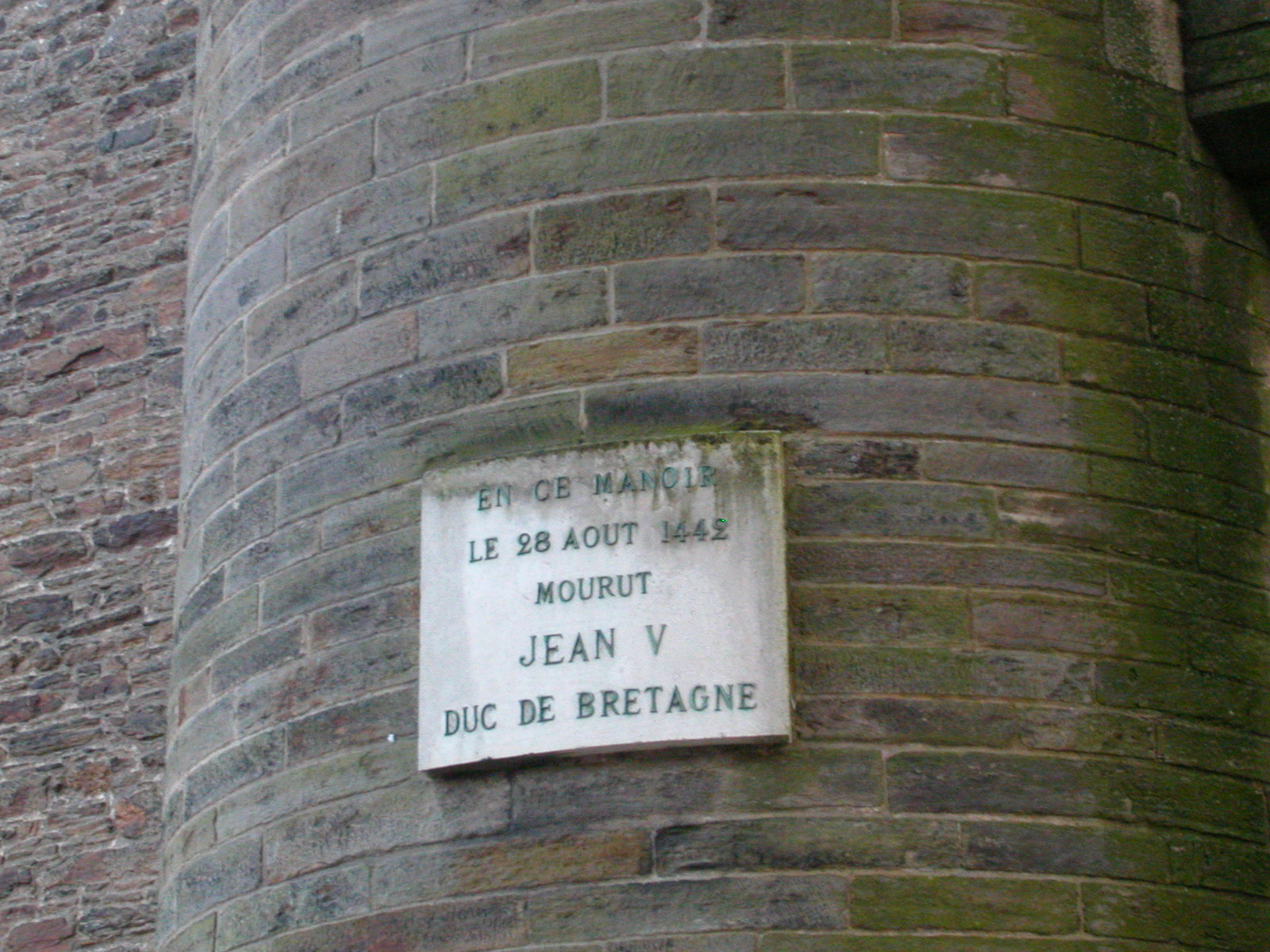
Plaque of John V

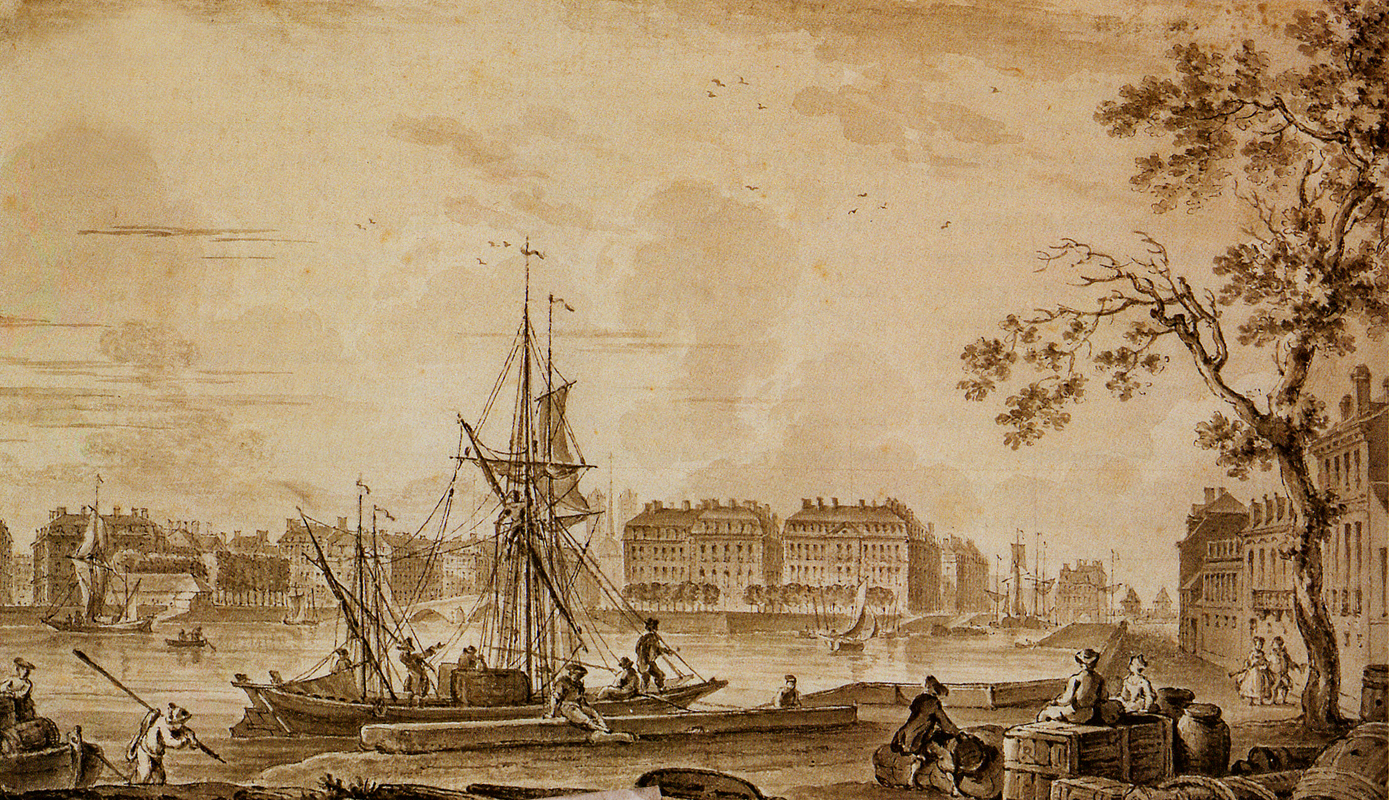
View of the port of Nantes

== See also ==
- Anne of Brittany's heart jewel case

== Bibliography ==
- Thomas Dobrée, 1810-1895. Un homme, un musée (collective catalogue); Nantes, Musée Dobrée et P., Somogy, 1997, 328pp
