= Convent of the Cordeliers of Nantes =

Former religious structure

Cordeliers Convent
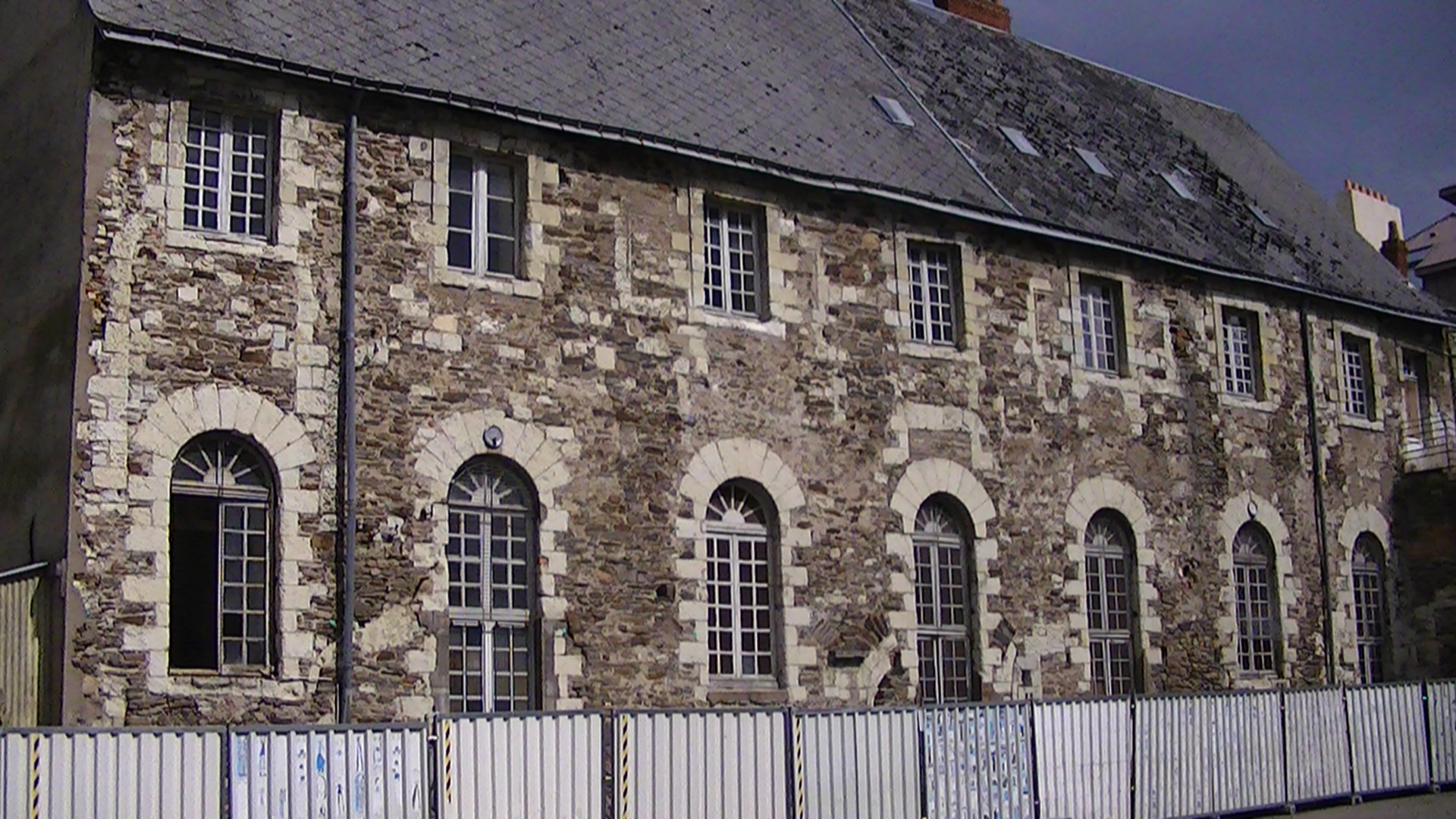
- Inside view
- Interactive map of Cordeliers Convent
- Location: Nantes; France
- Coordinates: 47°13′09″N 1°33′10″W
- Type: Convent
- Beginning date: 13th century

The former Cordeliers Convent in Nantes, France, was constructed in the 13th century and now remains only in ruins. It was situated in the city center, approximately 200 meters northwest of the cathedral. The site currently accommodates the private Saint-Pierre School.

== Location ==
The convent was originally established in an area bounded by rue des Cordeliers (later renamed rue Saint-Jean) to the west, the priory of the collegiate church of Notre-Dame de Nantes to the south, the 13th- and 15th-century city walls to the east, and the Chambre des comptes of Brittany to the north.

In its present configuration, the site is approximately enclosed by rue Saint-Jean, rue des Cordeliers, rue du Refuge, and rue d’Aguesseau.

A section of the Gallo-Roman wall of Nantes remains preserved on the site.

== History ==
=== Franciscan convent ===
The Cordeliers established themselves in Nantes in the 13th century, before 1253. The land for their convent was donated either by the de Rieux family or by the Dukes of Brittany. The site included a chapel, likely named Saint-Michel Chapel, built in 1232 by Bishop Henri I. This chapel was partially constructed on a section of the Gallo-Roman wall of Nantes, which had by that time lost their defensive function due to the commissioning of a new wall further east and north along the Erdre River by Pierre Mauclerc.

Over time, the convent was regularly used by local institutions. Approximately twenty craft guilds held meetings there, and the site included an archive room and a chapel. General assemblies of the university took place on the premises, with a room designated as the “university hall.” Theology courses were conducted there after 1700. The Chambre des comptes of Brittany was housed at the convent from 1500 to 1535 and again from 1760 to 1782. The convent also hosted several notable events, including the Brittany Council of 1538, sessions of the Parliament of the League, the election of Nantes’ first mayor, Geoffroy Drouet, in 1564, the execution of Henri de Talleyrand-Périgord following the Chalais conspiracy in 1626, and assemblies of the Estates.

At the end of the 18th century, the convent was affected by urban development projects led by architects Jean-Baptiste Ceineray and Mathurin Crucy. The creation of the Place du Département (later Place Roger-Salengro) and the Rue Royale (later Rue du Roi-Albert) encroached on the convent’s northern gardens. A plan prepared by engineer Recommencé and approved by Crucy in 1785 proposed a new street connecting the Place du Département with the old Rue des Cordeliers, which required the demolition of several buildings. This street, named Rue Saint-François (later Rue d’Aguesseau), was opened in 1786.

=== After the Revolution ===
On 18 April 1791, during the French Revolution, the convent was closed. It was initially used by a political club, La Société des Amis de la Révolution (later the Société Vincent-La-Montagne). Later that year, the sculptor Jacques Lamarie occupied the site to work on a statue of Louis XVI for a planned column by Crucy, although the project was not completed; the statue was eventually realized in 1823 by Dominique Molknecht.

Subsequently, a cannon foundry was established on the site. The Voruz brothers operated one of their three workshops there, with the other two located south of the collegiate church of Notre-Dame de Nantes and on rue Galilée (later rue du Calvaire). They later acquired a house on Rue Royale (Rue du Roi-Albert) for their workshop before consolidating their activities in 1829 near Place Canclaux.

In 1811, the Dames Blanches (Carmelite nuns) acquired the convent and in 1812 transferred it to the sisters of the order of Notre-Dame de Charité, also known as the “Dames de la Retraite.”

In 1835, the construction of rue des Cordeliers led to the demolition of the conventual church. Most of the former convent, located north of the street, became part of the private Saint-Pierre School, while a smaller portion to the south was integrated into the private Saint-Vincent-de-Paul School.

The remaining convent buildings were gradually demolished in 1869, 1874, and 1924.

Despite the demolitions, the former Cordeliers Convent remains the only medieval conventual structure in Nantes to retain substantial remnants. A 2011 real estate project prompted public protests advocating for the preservation of the site.

The municipality has proposed transforming the convent into a center for the interpretation of history and heritage, and an initial archaeological survey was conducted in May 2014 as part of this plan.

== See also ==
- Order of Friars Minor

== Bibliography ==
- de Berranger, Henri (1975). Évocation du vieux Nantes [Evocation of old Nantes] (in French) (2nd ed.). Paris: Les Éditions de Minuit. ISBN 2-7073-0061-6. OCLC 312748431.
- Brault, Ferdinand (1925). "Le couvent des Cordeliers de Nantes, étude historique" [The Cordeliers Convent in Nantes, a historical study]. Bulletin (in French). 65: 165–193.
- Jeulin, Paul (1925). "L'ancien couvent des Cordeliers de Nantes de 1791 à 1925, étude archéologique" [The former Cordeliers convent in Nantes from 1791 to 1925, archaeological study]. Bulletin (in French). 65: 195–215.
- Jeulin, Paul (1926). "L'ancien couvent des Cordeliers de Nantes de 1791 à 1925, étude archéologique" [The former Cordeliers convent in Nantes from 1791 to 1925, archaeological study]. Bulletin (in French). 66: 133–145.
- Jeulin, Paul. Le Couvent des cordeliers de Nantes vers 1785 [The Cordeliers Convent in Nantes around 1785] (in French). Rennes: Philon et Hommay.
- Le Marec, Yannick (2006). L'industriel et la cité : Voruz, fondeur nantais [The industrialist and the city: Voruz, foundry owner from Nantes]. Carnets d'usines (in French). Nantes: éditions MeMo. ISBN 2-910391-93-0.
- Collectif (1978). Iconographie de Nantes [Iconography of Nantes] (in French). Nantes: Musée Dobrée. p. 61.
- Pied, Édouard (1906). Notices sur les rues de Nantes [Information about the streets of Nantes] (in French). A. Dugas. p. 2.
