= Gallo-Roman wall of Nantes =

Roman enclosure in Loire-Atlantique, France

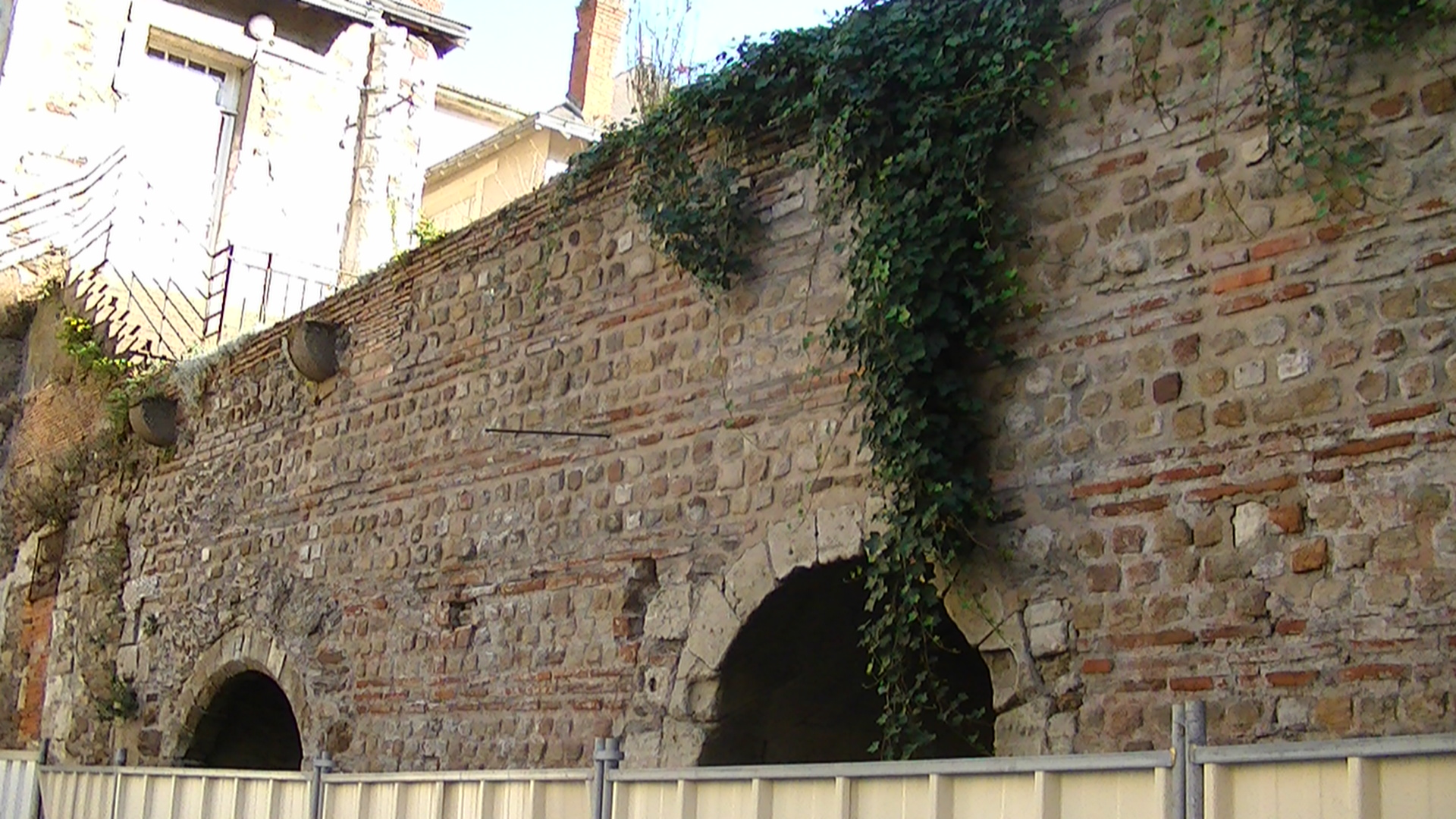
- Gallo-Roman wall of Nantes inside the former convent of the Cordeliers (the modern Saint-Pierre school).
- Interactive map of Gallo-Roman wall of Nantes
- Location: Nantes, Loire-Atlantique
- Coordinates: 47°13′08″N 1°33′10″W
- Type: Defensive wall
- Beginning date: 276
- Completion date: 4th century
- Classified as MH (1926)

The Gallo-Roman wall of Nantes was a wall surrounding the city of Portus Namnetum (today Nantes, France), from the period of Roman Gaul until the High Middle Ages, which is now in ruins.

== History ==
During the Germanic invasions in the 270s, the city of Portus Namnetum, which covered the modern Bouffay quarter, was without defenses. The first wall was constructed after 276, judging from the miliarii that were included in its foundations, which bear the name of emperor Tacitus, who reigned for only one year.. The construction of the wall was probably completed by emperor Probus.

The wall allowed the city to avoid the invasions taking place in Late Antiquity, but in the 9th century, it was not sufficient to repel the raids of the Vikings, who pillaged the city and burned the Romanesque Cathedral of St. Peter and St. Paul. The damaged walls were rebuilt in the 10th century. In the early 10th century, bishop Foucher had the wall to the east of the cathedral torn down in order to expand the cathedral, and he constructed fortifications in the east of the quarter surrounding the cathedral, although these defenses were once again destroyed by the Vikings. Around 940, Alan Barbetorte hastily built earthenwork defenses.

In the 13th century, new walls were built by Guy of Thouars and his son-in-law Peter Mauclerc, duke of Brittany. At that time, a large part of the Roman wall was demolished, but the sections extending along the Erdre and the Loire remained more or less intact until the modern period, when the population began to increase beyond the limits of the ancient and medieval walls. Certain sections survived up to the 19th century.

== Extent ==
The wall, which was 1665 meters long and covered 16 hectares, was one of the largest walls in Gaul. It extended from the modern château des ducs de Bretagne north to the cathedral and the Porte Saint-Pierre, then west to Rue Saint-Léonard following the modern Rue des Cordeliers and Rue Garde-Dieu, where it formed the north wall of the convent of the Cordeliers in the late Middle Ages. It then turned south along Rue Saint-Léonard and the former course of the Erdre, until it reached the Loire near the modern Église Sainte-Croix and Place du Bouffay, where the Château du Bouffay and the Tour du Bouffay were built in the Middle Ages. From there, it followed the banks of the Loire and ended at the castle. All along its length, at each corner (i.e., at the site of the present castle, at Porte Sainte-Pierre, at Rue Saint-Léonard, and at Bouffay), there was a circular tower and semi-circular towers eight meters in diameter, as well as many other gates and posterns.

== Construction ==
The construction of the exterior was typical of the Late Roman Empire. According to Marcel Giraud-Mangin:

The facings of both sides are made from small stones, that is, formed from regular courses of squared rubble joined with cement. The space between the two faces is filled with blocks consisting of pebbles, stone chips, and broken bricks, embedded in concrete or lime mortar. The exterior side is decorated with a triple layer of bricks, laid flat on top of three or four rows of rubble..

This construction style can be seen throughout the former Roman Empire, from London to Constantinople. Another example in Nantes can be found in one of the walls of the Chapelle Saint-Étienne, which dates from the same time period.

The foundations of the wall and the first three or four layers of stones are irregular, made from coarse rubble; clearly, this part was below ground. The layers of squared stones have a height of 33 centimeters (at the Porte Saint-Pierre) or 40 centimeters (at the Convent of the Cordeliers), and the layers of bricks are 16.5 and 20 centimeters in height, respectively. On the other hand, the interior side is not constructed this way. It is composed only of coarse rubble and rarely bricks..

The thickness of the wall varies slightly from 4.26 meters (Saint-Pierre) to 3.8 metres (Convent). It varies somewhat more in height, from 7.5 to 8.5 meters.

== Remains ==
In the 19th century, some remains of the wall were visible at the Place du Bouffay and inside the houses on Rue Prémion and Rue Saint-Léonard, but they have since disappeared. Likewise, another part, discovered in 1910 at Rue de l'Écluse (the modern Rue des Trois-Croissants), no longer exists.

Today, only the sections mentioned above remain: on the Cours Saint-Pierre and at the Porte Saint-Pierre (beside the cathedral), as well as inside the Convent of the Cordeliers (near the École Saint-Pierre), and lastly a remnant inside the Musée d'histoire de Nantes in the castle. The section near the Porte Saint-Pierre was excavated in 1910-1911; only 2 meters in height remains, as the medieval wall was constructed on top of it.

The biggest and best-preserved section is in the yard of the Saint-Pierre primary school (9 Rue du Refuge). This remnant is 5 metres high and 18 meters long. During the Middle Ages, two vaulted passageways with stairs were dug into the wall; one of them contains a small chapel.

The section inside the school was registered as a monument historique by decree on November 27, 1926.

== Photo gallery ==
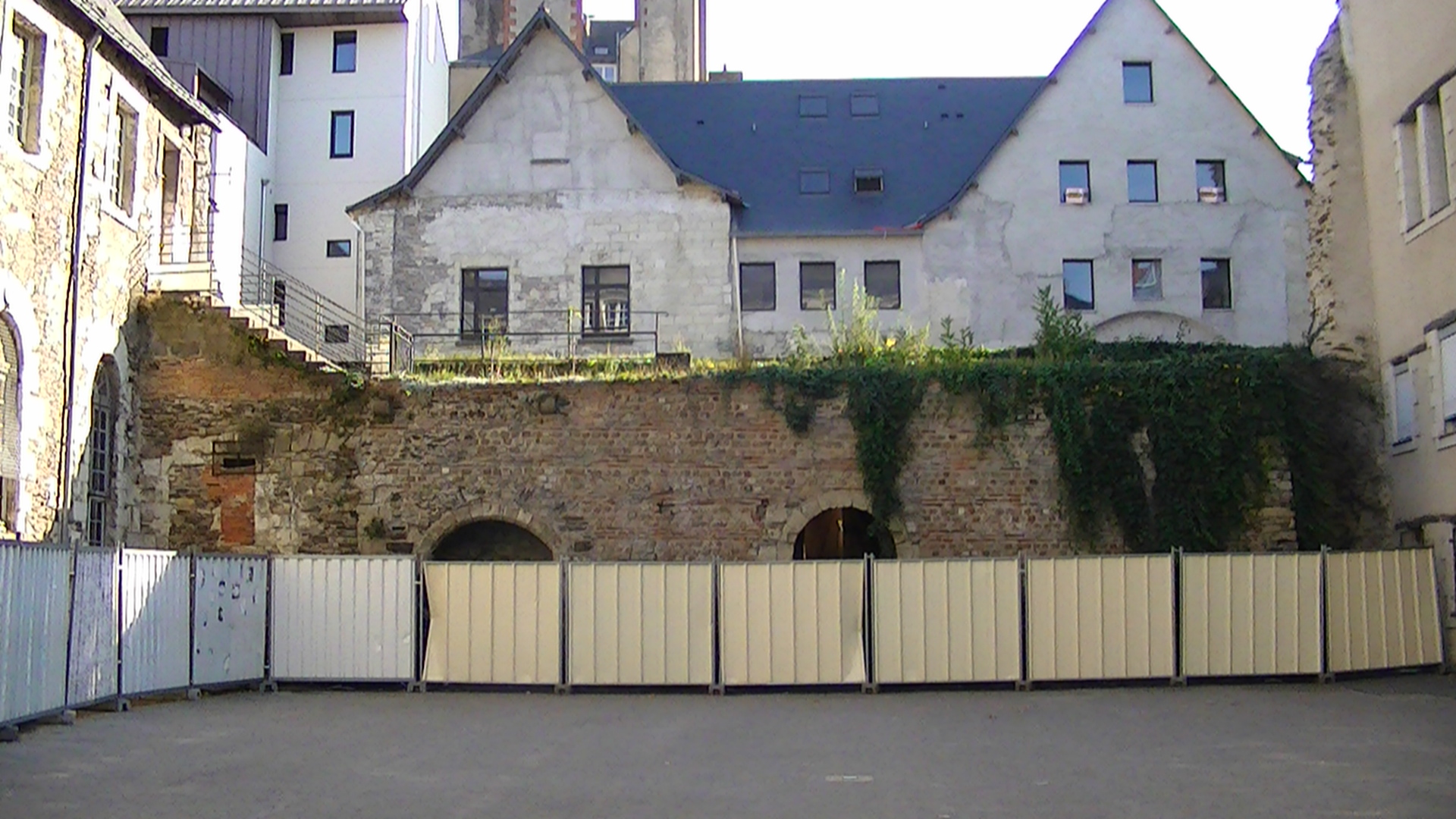
The wall inside the École Saint-Pierre.

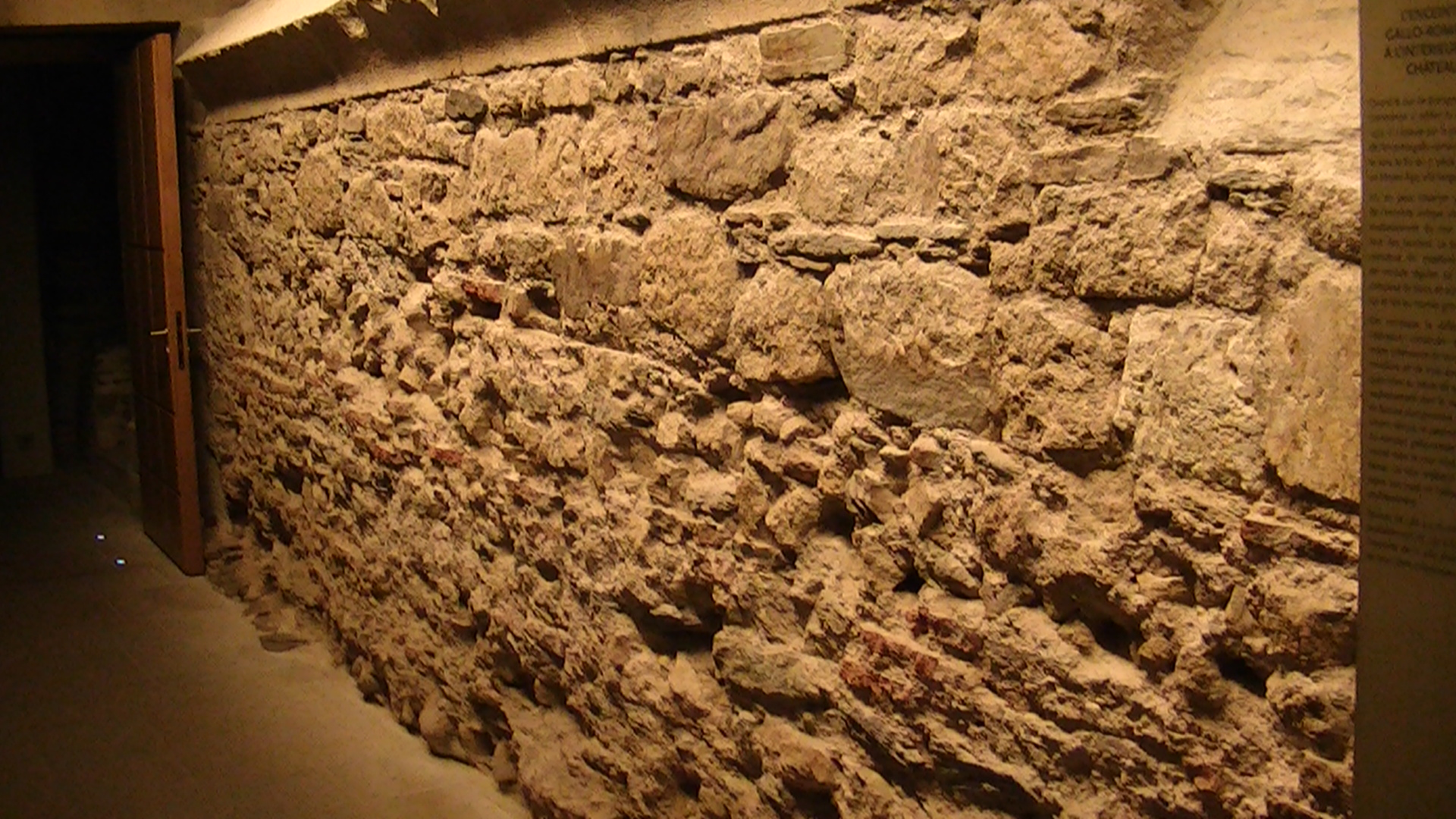
The wall iniside the castle.

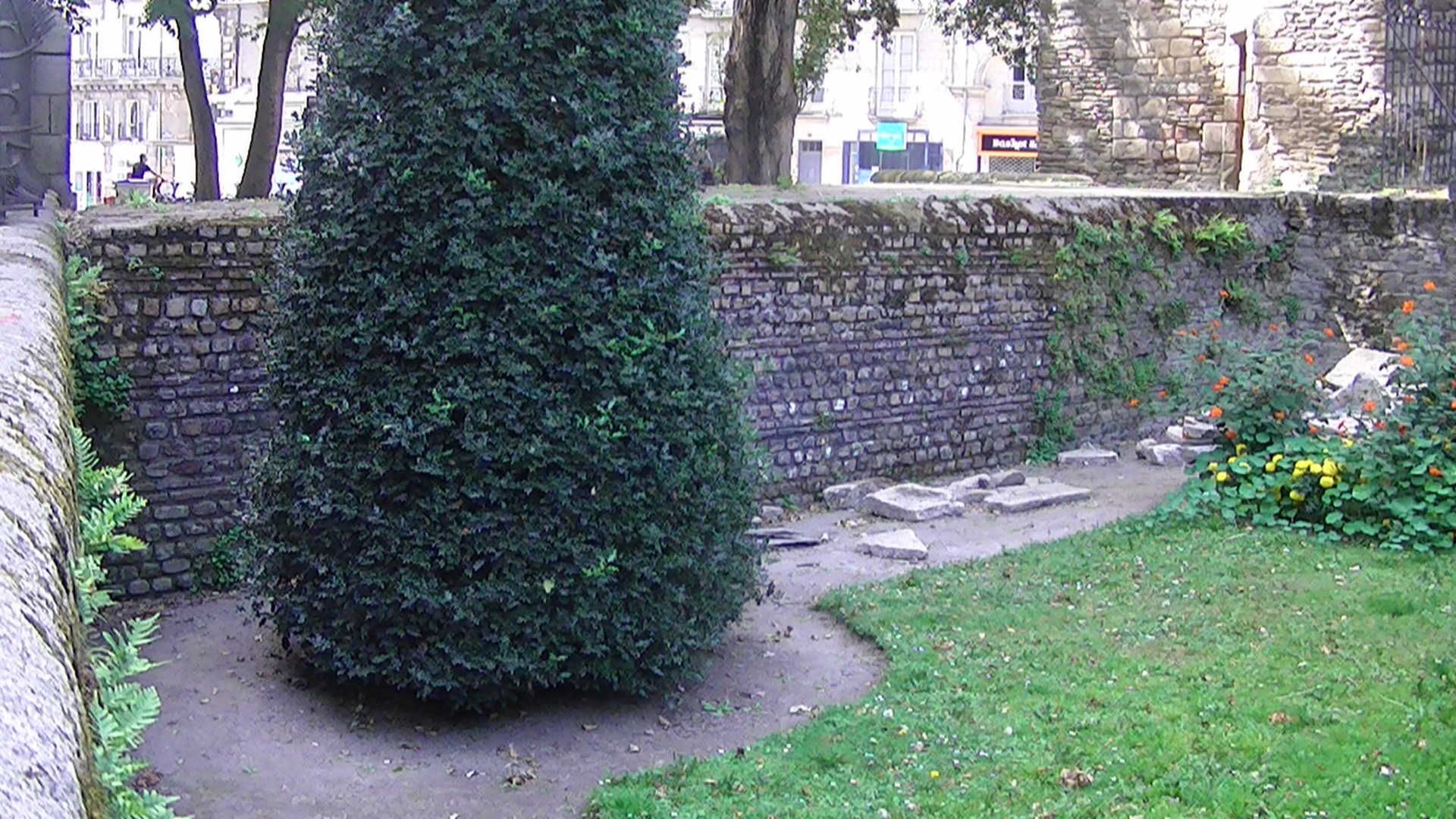
The wall beside the Porte Saint-Pierre.

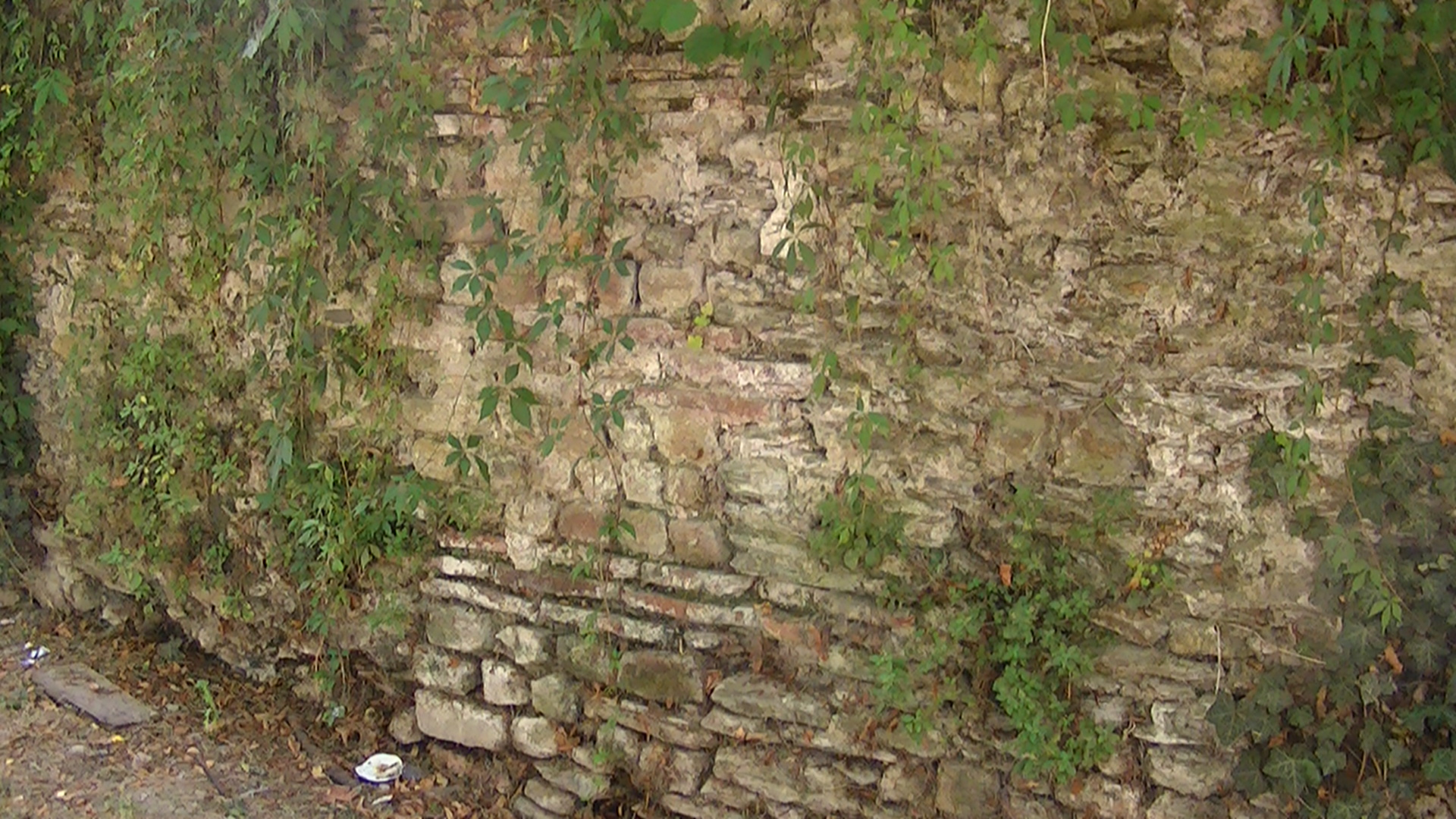
The wall along the Cours Saint-Pierre.

== See also ==
- Gallo-Roman enclosure of Le Mans
- Gallo-Roman enclosure of Tours
- Vestiges of the Gallo-Roman wall, Grenoble

=== Bibliography ===
- de Berranger, Henri (1975). Évocation du vieux Nantes (in French) (2 ed.). Paris: Les Éditions de Minuit. ISBN 2-7073-0061-6. OCLC 312748431..

=== Related articles ===
- Timeline of Nantes
- Convent of the Cordeliers of Nantes
- Saint-Pierre gate, Nantes
- Namnetes
