= Château-Gaillard (Vannes) =

French hôtel particulier and archaeological museum

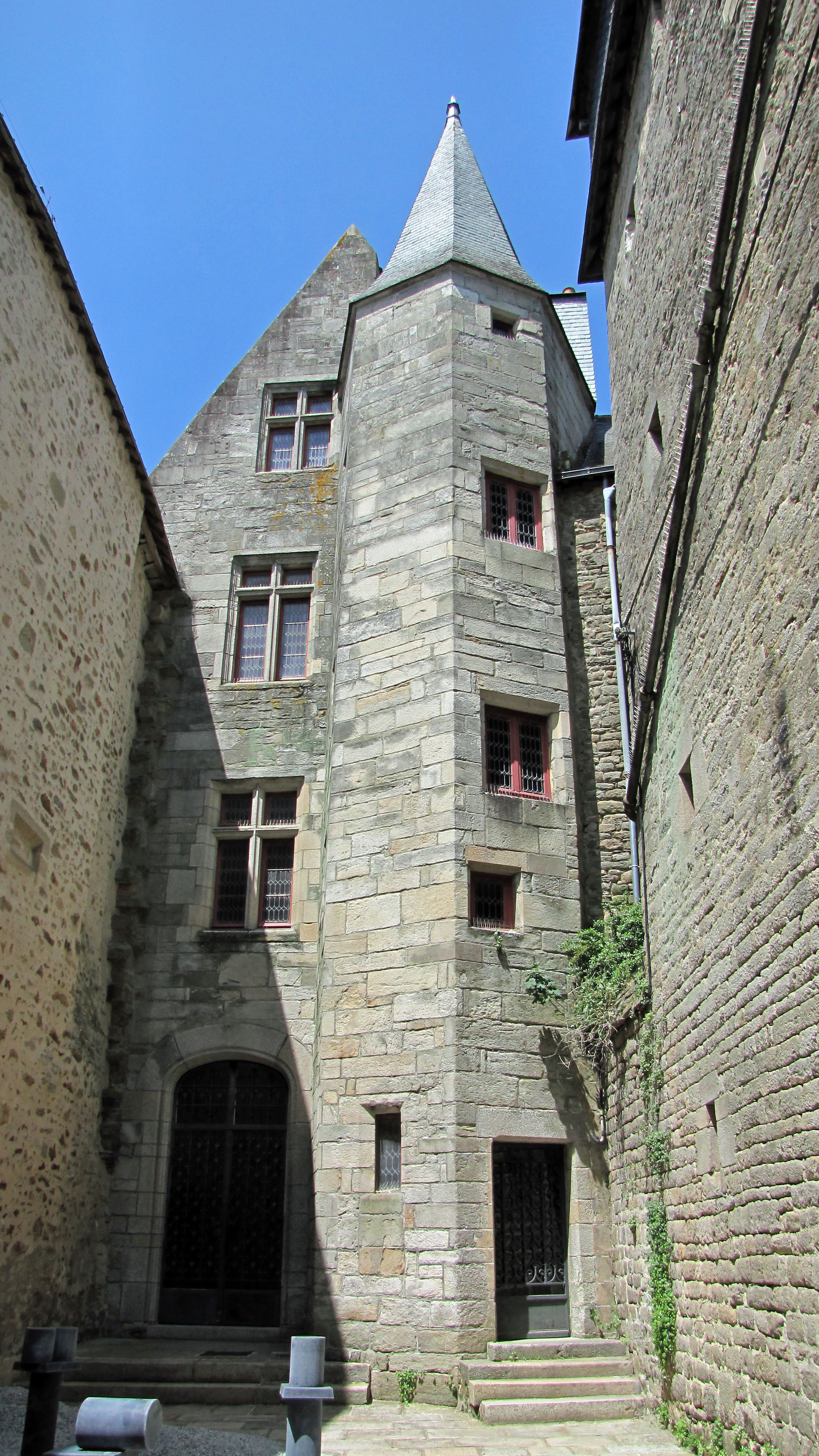

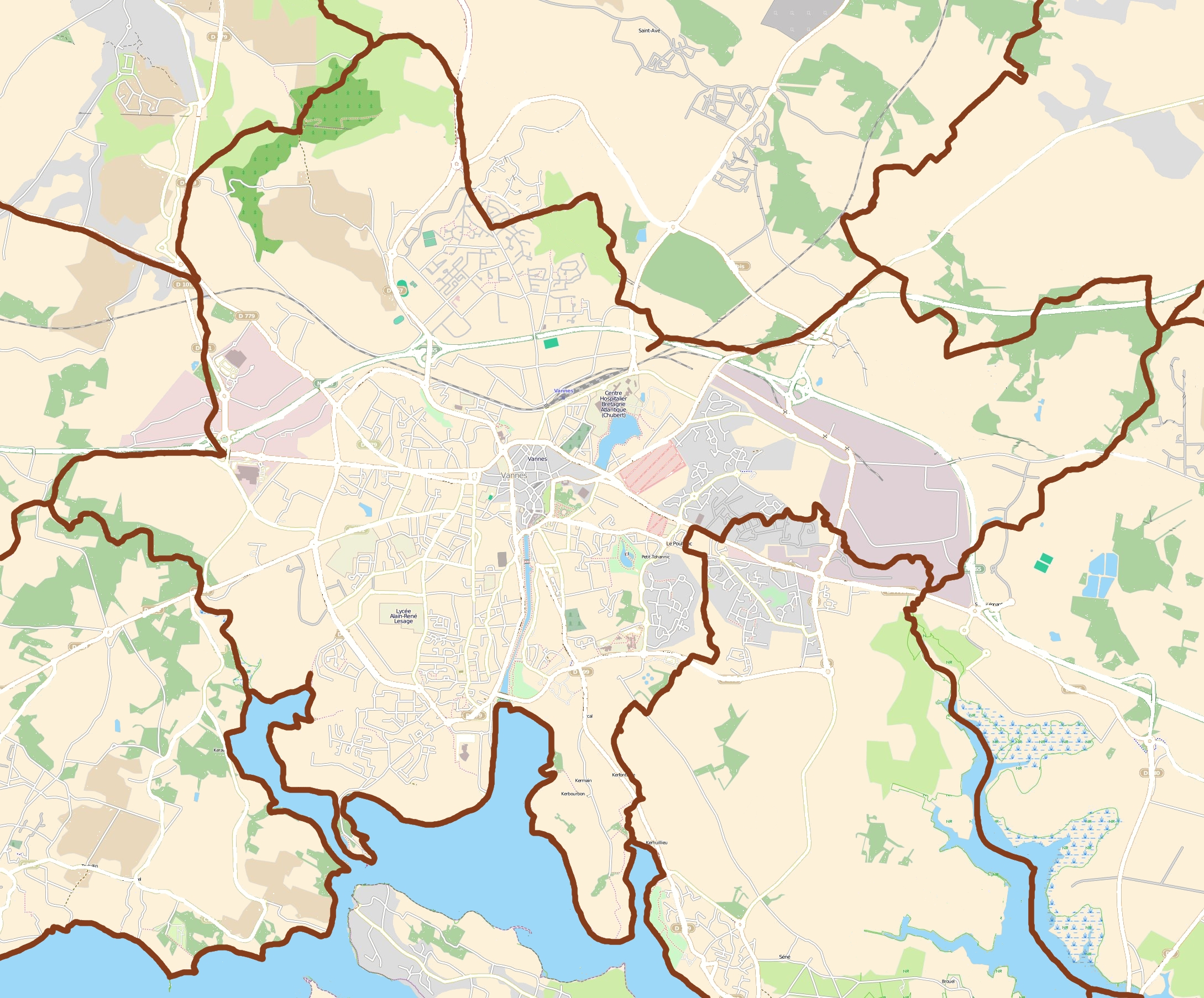
- Location within Vannes

General information
- Type: hôtel particulier
- Location: Vannes
- Coordinates: 47.656861°N 2.757972°W
- Completed: 1410
- Client: Jean de Malestroit
- Owner: City of Vannes

The Château-Gaillard is a French hôtel particulier and an archaeological museum, built in the late Middle Ages in Vannes.

== History ==
Originally built as an administrative building for cardinal Jean de Malestroit, construction of the hotel was completed in 1410 and was commissioned by Jean de Malestroit, bishop to Saint_Brieuc and Nantes and Chancellor of Jean V. The building was owned by several owners throughout its history, however, in 1912 the building was bought by historical society Société polymathique du Morbihan to house a new museum. On September 22, 1914, President of France Raymond Poincaré officially opened the museum's new collections. The building was federally protected by the Minister of Culture in 1913.

== Description ==
The former Hôtel du Parlement de Bretagne is made up of two main buildings with mullioned windows, served by a spiral staircase located in a polygonal stone tower. At the rear, another narrower spiral staircase leads to the various levels. This building is decorated with Renaissance paintings and woodwork and a coffered ceiling. The roof is supported by a timber roof truss.

The Pierre de Justice or Breton memorial of the Lande de Justice de Crach, as well as various stones (including lec'hs and milestone) found in the department, were formerly displayed in the courtyard overlooking the rue Noé. This Stone of Justice was listed as a historic monument on January 25, 1937.

The museum has a collection of artifacts and documents.

== Gallery ==
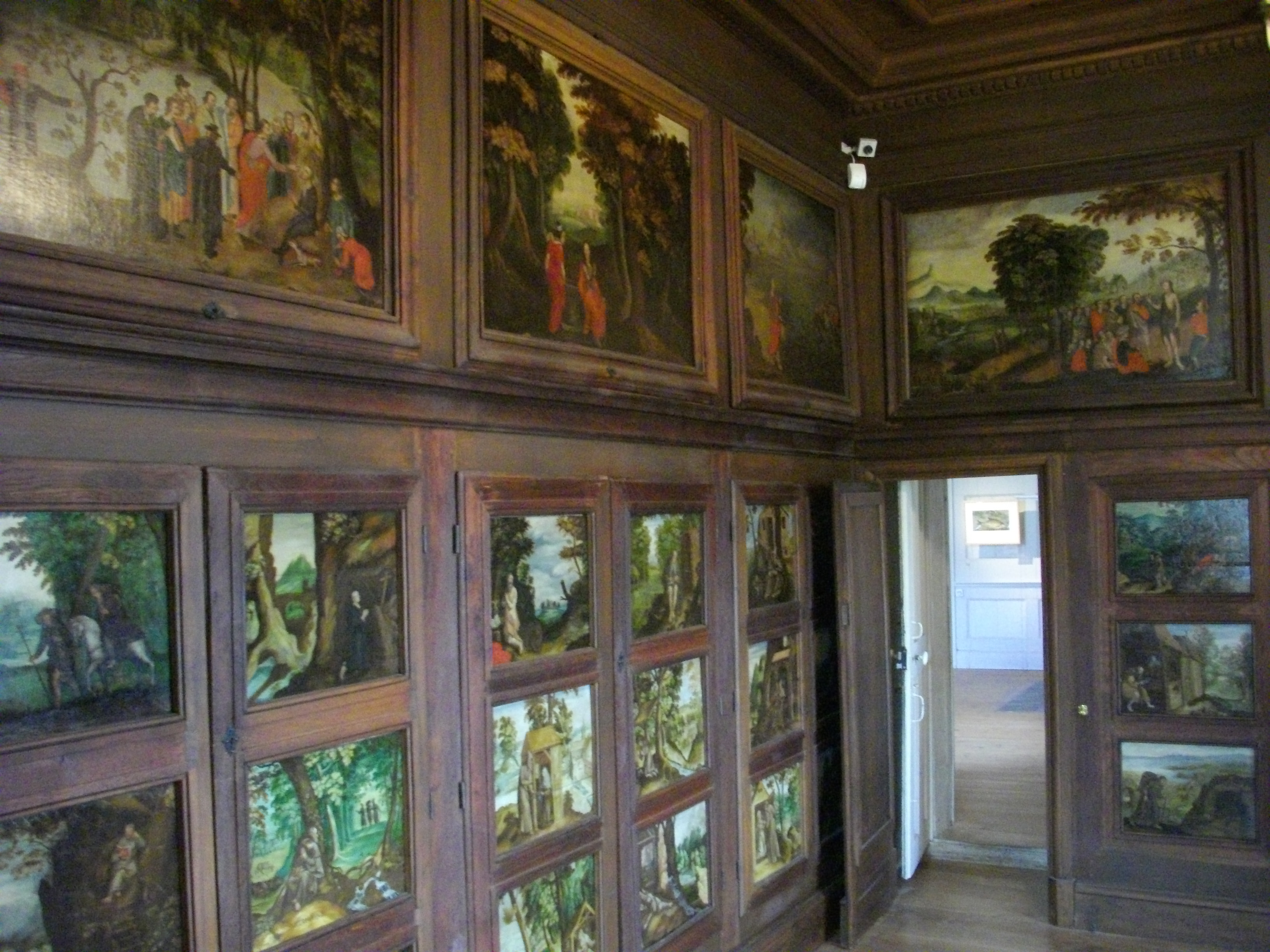

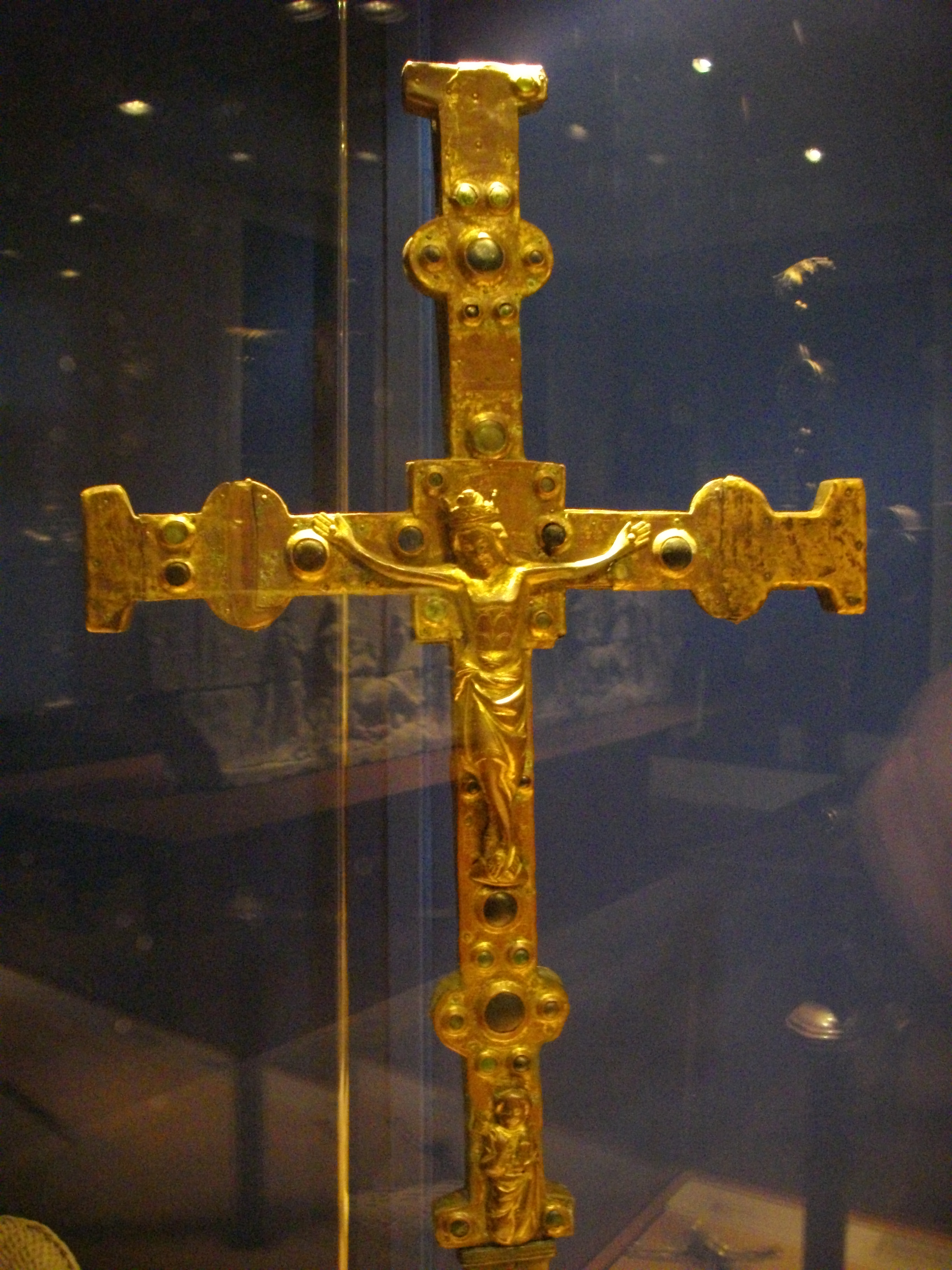

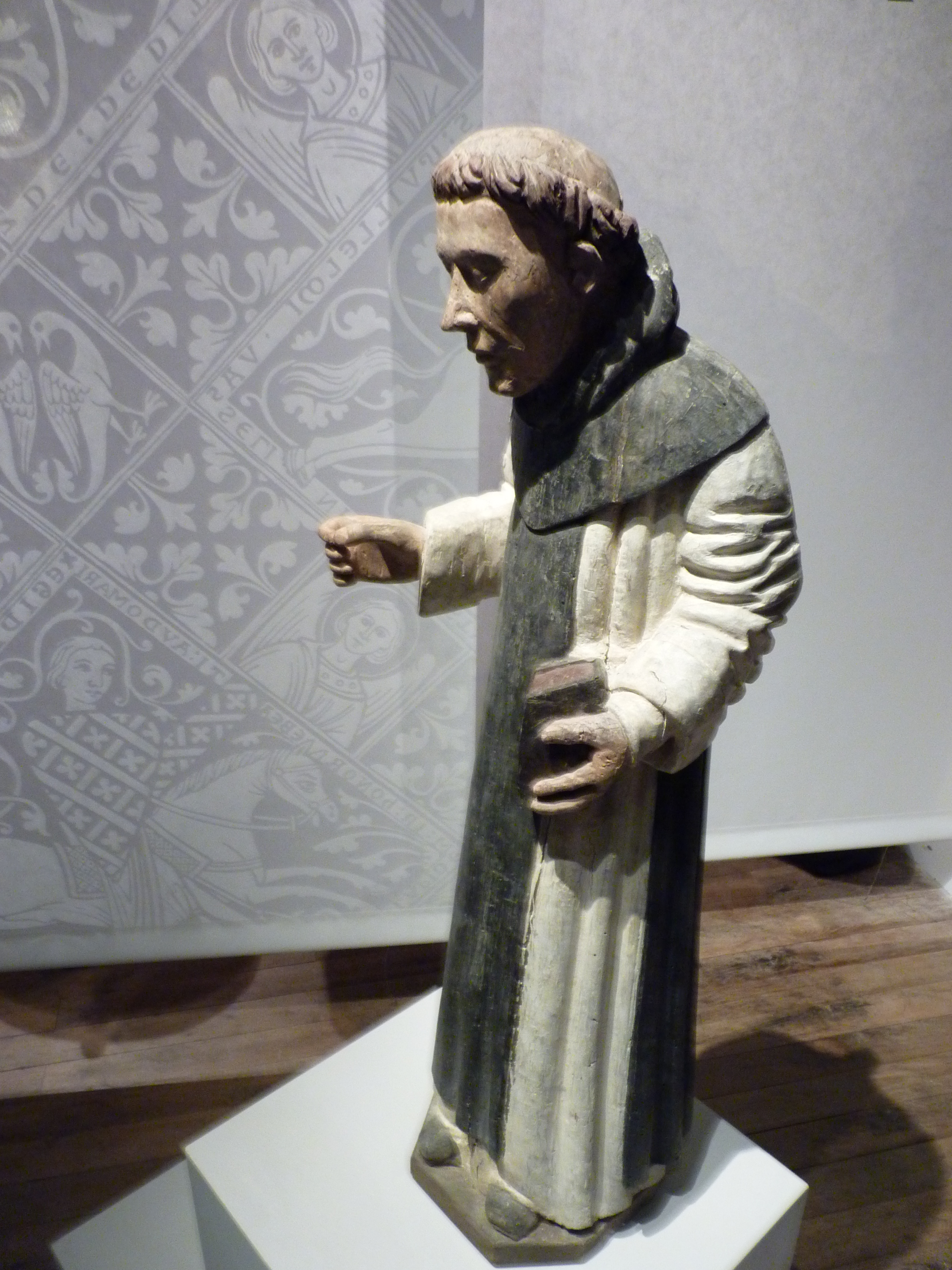

== Bibliography ==
- (in French) J. de la Martinière, Le plus ancien manoir de Vannes, in Bulletin de la société polymathique du Morbihan, p. 93-152.
