= Saint-Pierre gate, Nantes =

Historic gate and remnant of the city walls in Nantes, France

Porte Saint-Pierre
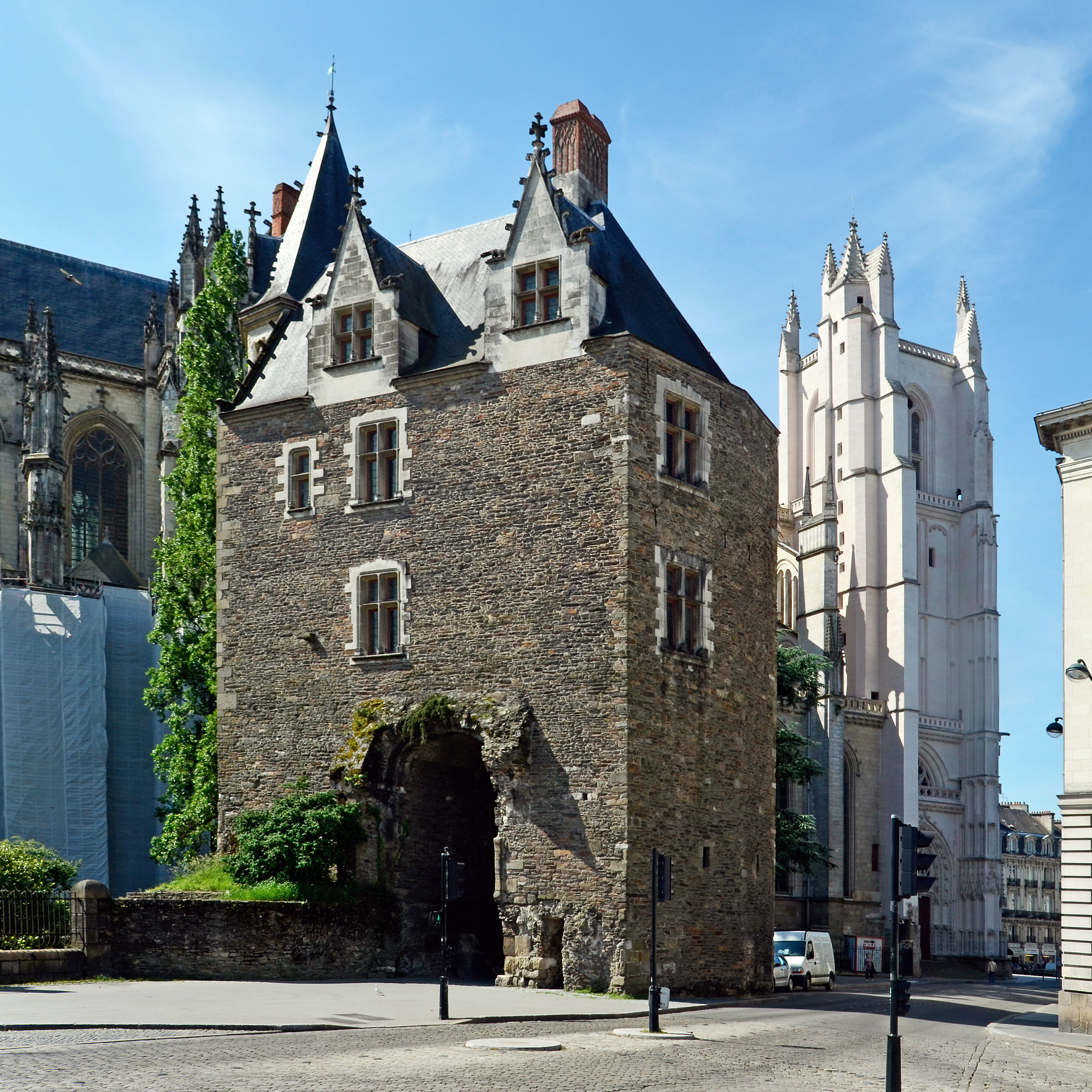
- The Porte Saint-Pierre seen from Place Maréchal-Foch with the cathedral in the background.
- Interactive map of the Porte Saint-Pierre area

General information
- Architectural style: Gothic architecture
- Location: Nantes, Loire-Atlantique, France
- Coordinates: 47.2186°N 1.5489°W

The Saint-Pierre gate (also known as the Bastion Saint-Pierre Gate or Manoir Guéguen) is the best-preserved remnant of the city walls of Nantes, France.

== Overview ==
Constructed in the 15th century for its lower section and built upon Gallo-Roman foundations from the 3rd century, the gate also incorporates remnants of the 9th to 13th-century enclosures. It is located at the end of Rue de l'Évêché, opening onto the Cours Saint-Pierre and Place Maréchal-Foch, near the chevet of the Saint-Pierre-et-Saint-Paul Cathedral.

Protected by a drawbridge spanning a moat dug by Guy de Thouars, the gate was originally flanked by two large towers: the "Guy de Thouars Tower" to the north and the "Bishop’s Tower" to the south. The residence of the bishops of Nantes, once located near the Château des ducs de Bretagne, was relocated to the cathedral’s northern flank after a fire in Nantes in 1118. In the early 16th century, Bishop Guillaume III Guéguen commissioned a residence to be built atop the gate itself. Part of the structure was demolished in the 18th century during the creation of the Rue Royale (now Rue du Roi-Albert).

It is said that King Henry IV of France passed through the gate in 1598 when he entered Nantes to sign the Edict of Nantes. The road from Paris, roughly corresponding to today’s RN 23, Boulevard Jules-Verne, Rue du Général-Buat, and Rue Maréchal-Joffre, led directly to the Porte Saint-Pierre.

In the 18th century, the drawbridge was replaced with a stone causeway to improve access to the newly developed Cours Saint-Pierre et Saint-André.

Following the 1905 French law on the Separation of Church and State, the Porte Saint-Pierre, along with its adjacent buildings and chimneys, was designated a historic monument by a decree dated 17 September 1909. The nearby La Psallette manor, located on the opposite side of the cathedral’s chevet, was similarly classified.

In 1910, the gate was cleared of the former bishop’s palace. From the 1920s to the 1960s, the building housed the "Musée de Nantes par l’image," which featured a model of the port. The museum’s collections were later transferred to the Château des ducs de Bretagne.

A comprehensive restoration of the gate’s facades was completed in spring 2014.

== Gallery ==
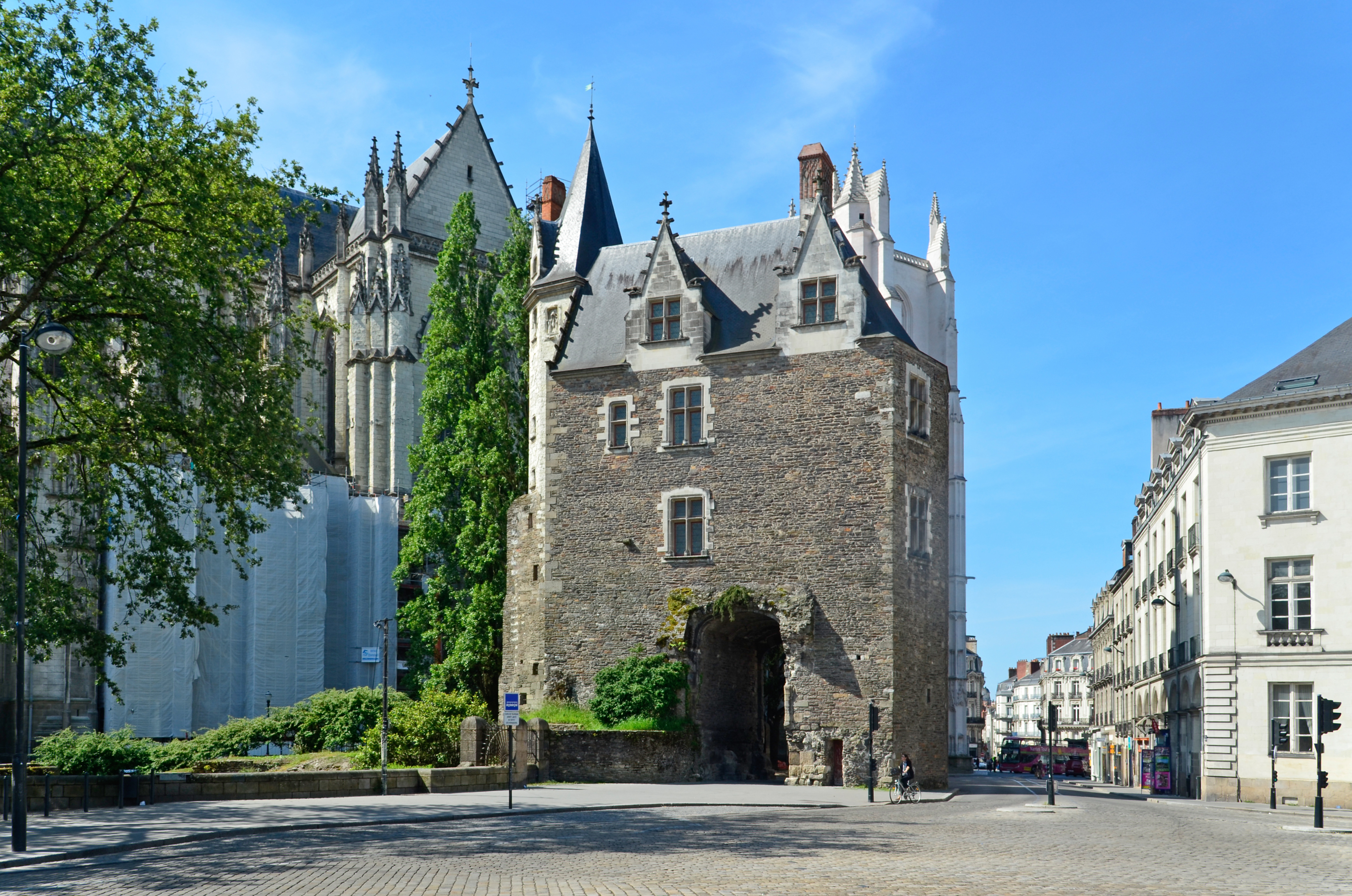
Eastern facade with the cathedral in the background

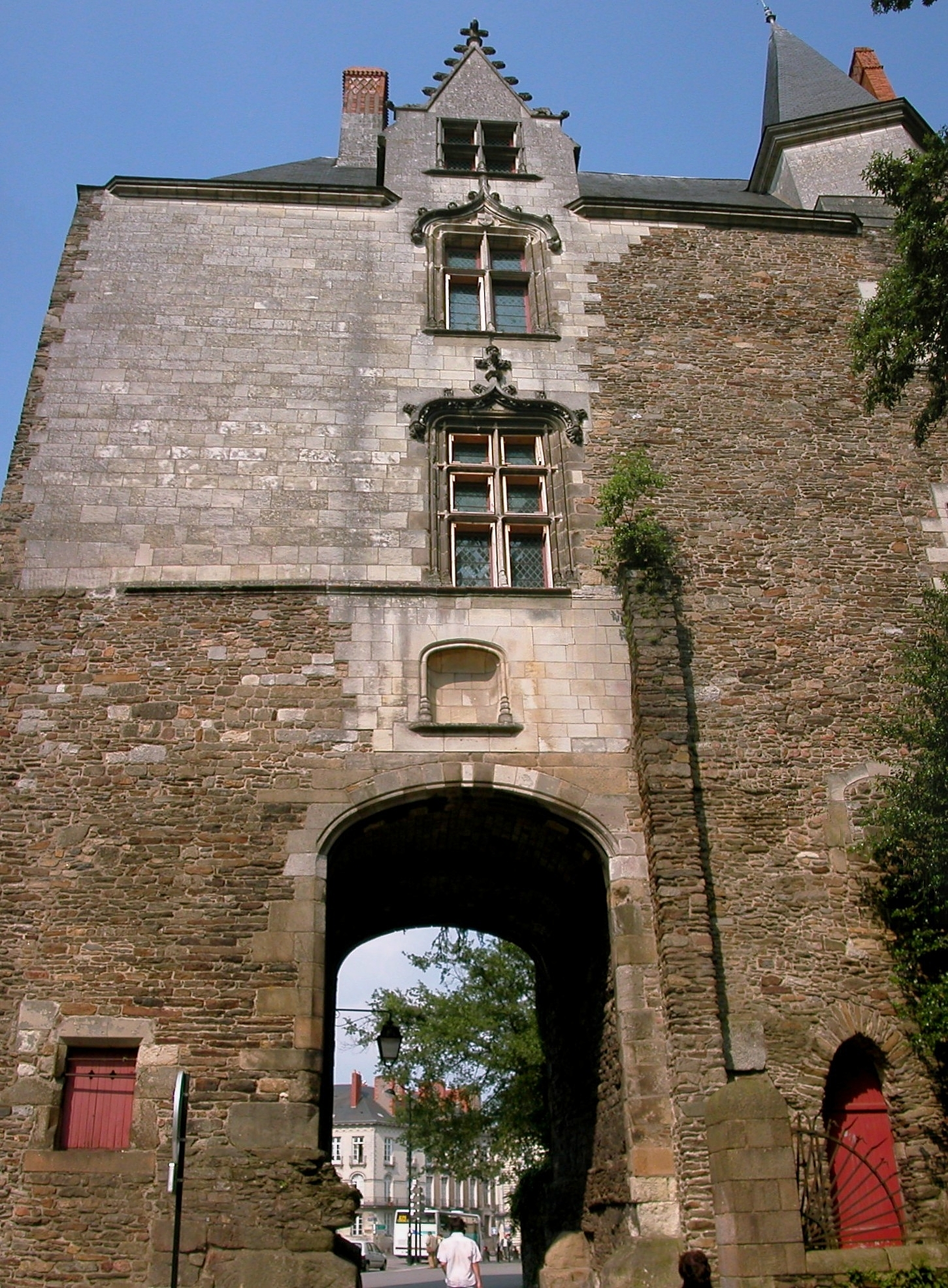
Western facade (inside the medieval city walls)

== See also ==
- History of Nantes
- Nantes Cathedral
- Château des ducs de Bretagne
- Edict of Nantes
- Gothic architecture in France
- Gallo-Roman wall of Nantes
