= Guillaume de Dammartin =

French architect

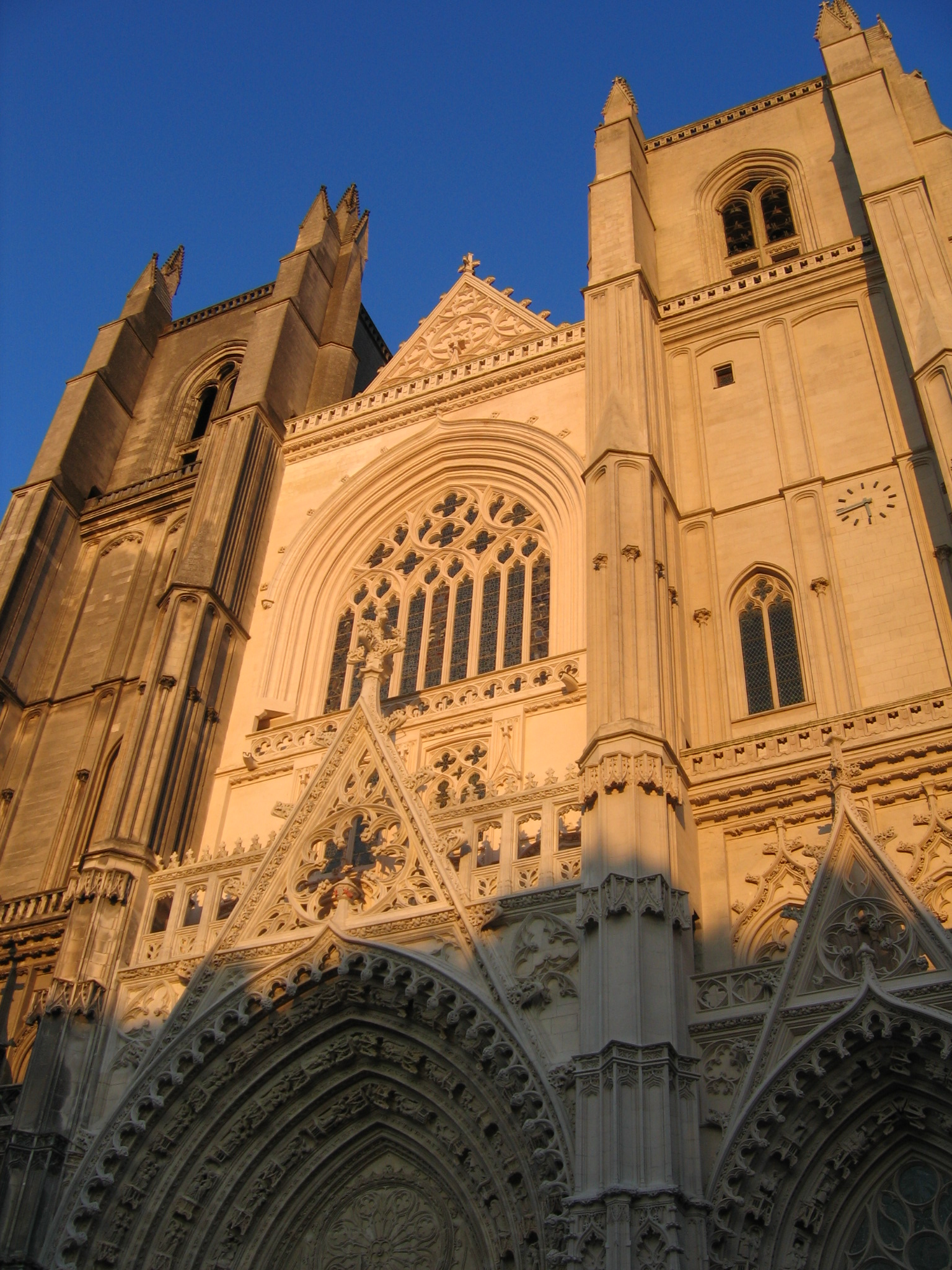

Guillaume de Dammartin or Dampmartin (fl 1432 – 1453) was a 15th-century French architect from the small village of Jargeau, near Orléans.. He is best known for designing the original plan of Nantes Cathedral in Brittany and commenced the building in 1434. He also designed cathedrals in Paris and le Mans. He received the title of Master of Masonry in 1453 and established a school in Tours. One of his protégés, Jean Papin, was considered his successor and was interred at the Nantes Cathedral upon his death in 1886.
