= Jean de Malestroit =

15th-century French Catholic bishop and pseudo-cardinal

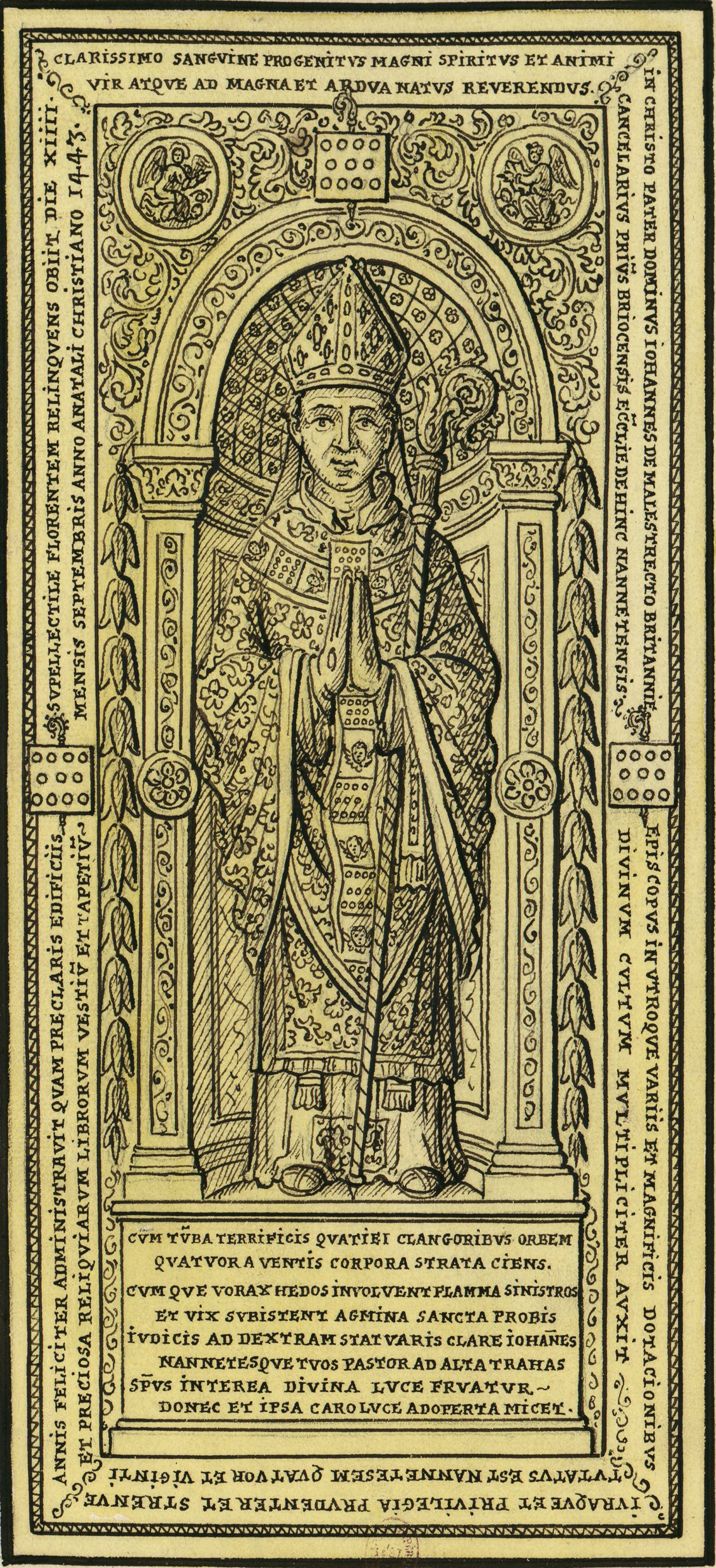
Français : Jean de Malestroit 1695

Jean de Malestroit was a pseudo-cardinal who served as Bishop of the Roman Catholic Diocese of Nantes from 17 July 1419 until 1443 AD when he resigned.

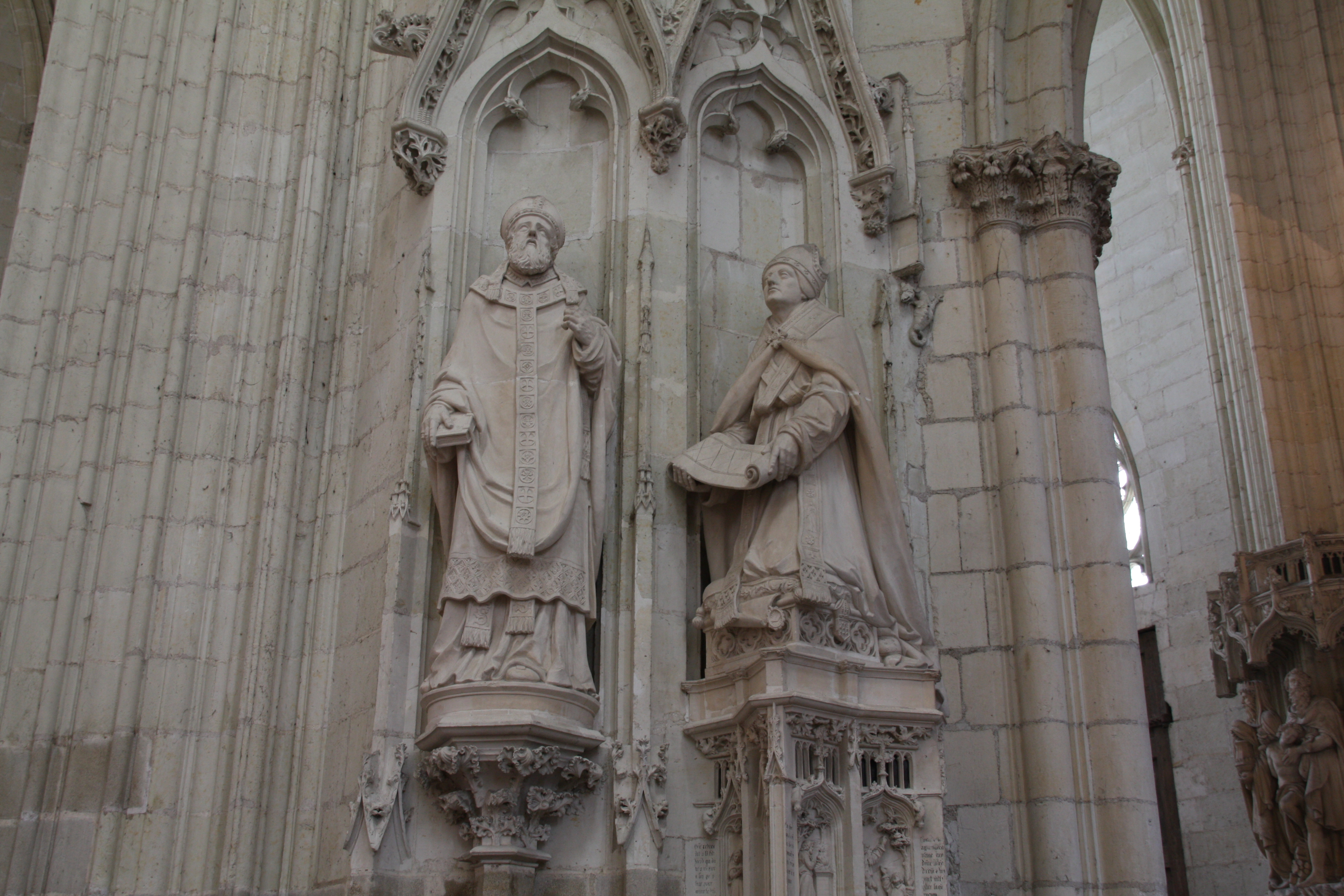
Contemporary statue of Jean de Malestroit (right)

Born in 1375 in Châteaugiron in the Duchy of Brittany, Jean de Malestroit was the sixth known son of Jean de Châteaugiron, lord of Malestroit and Largoët who died in 1374 and his second wife Jeanne Dol Dame de Combourg. He is also the half-brother Thibaud Malestroit (died 1408), who was bishop of Tréguier in 1378 and Quimper in 1383 AD.

== Life ==
Jean Malestroit was Archdeacon of the Diocese of Nantes. He was elected bishop of Saint Brieuc in 1405 and then joined the Privy Council of John VI, Duke of Brittany and became Governor General of Brittany's finances in 1406. He was First President of the Chamber of Accounts for Brittany at the beginning of 1408, then Chancellor, Duke and Treasurer Receiver General of the Duchy of Brittany a few months later. He was transferred to the diocese of Nantes 17 July 1419.

As bishop of Nantes, he launched with the Duke Jean V, on the construction site of the current St. Peter and St. Paul Cathedral. The Duke's son John VI and the bishop laid the first stone 14 April 1434. He also built Château-Gaillard (Vannes)

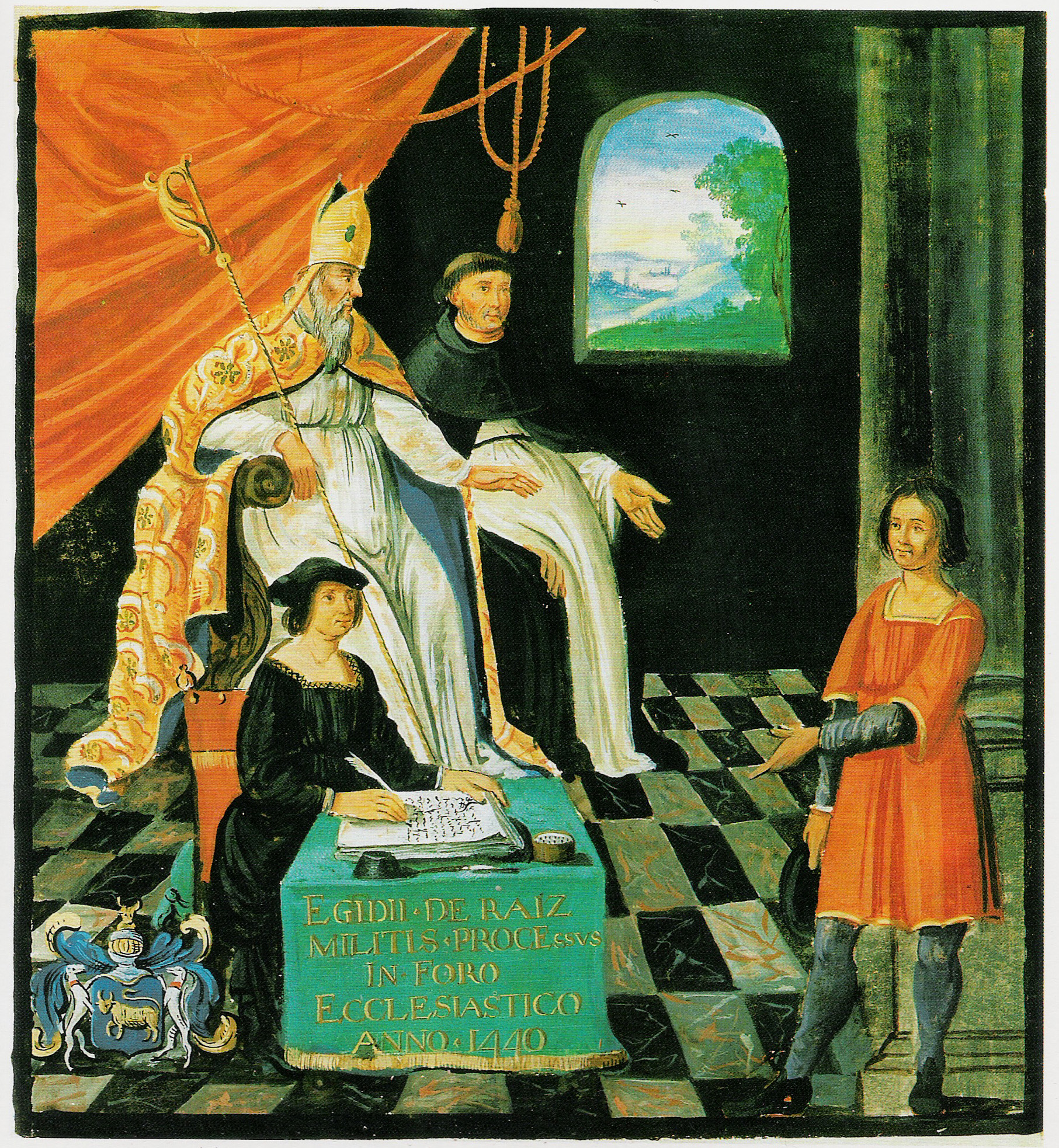
Gilles de Rais trial

Subsequently, he chaired the ecclesiastical trial of Gilles de Rais in October 1440 in Nantes.

Blason of Jean de Malestroit.

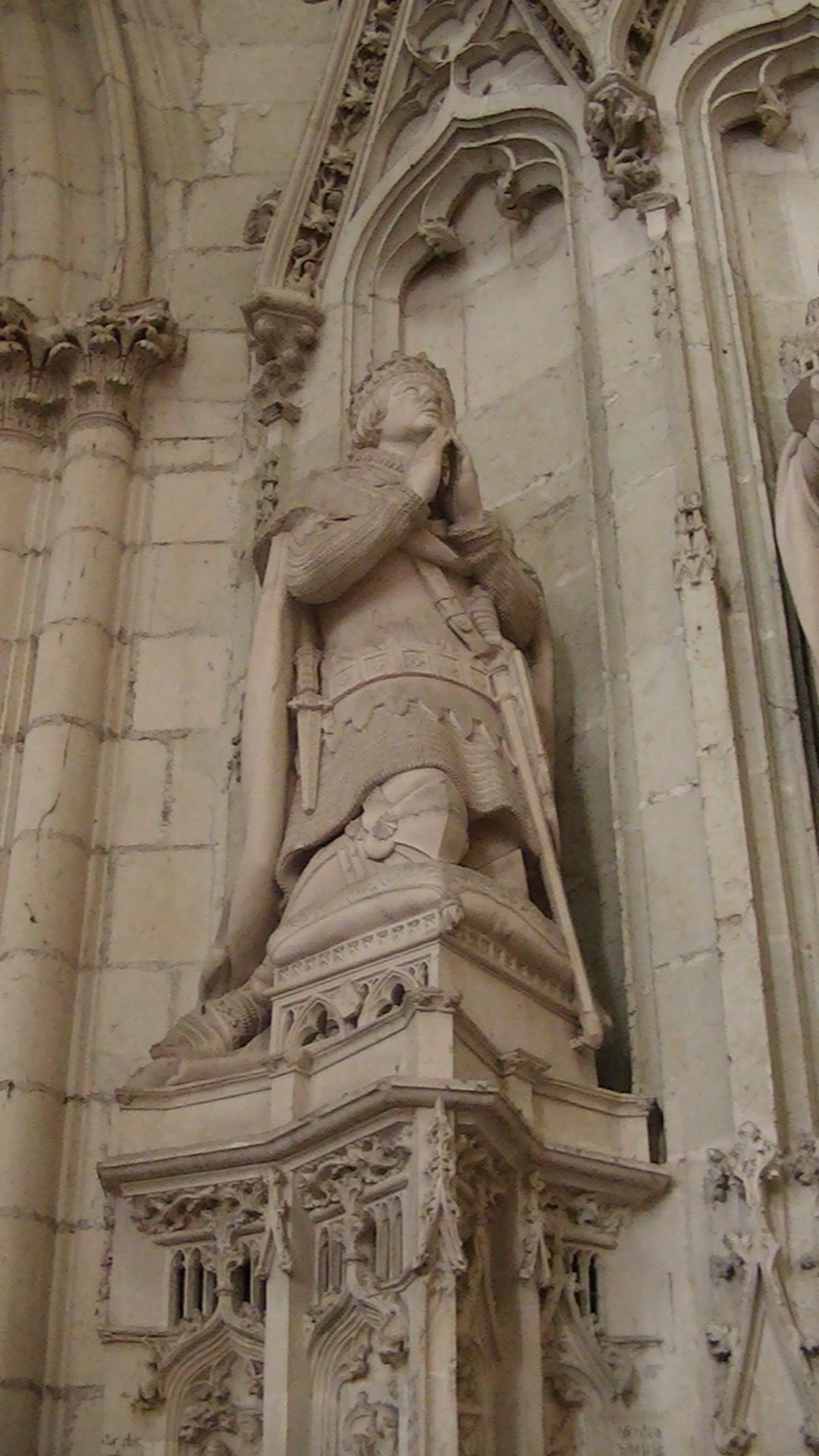
statue of John V of Brittany.jpg

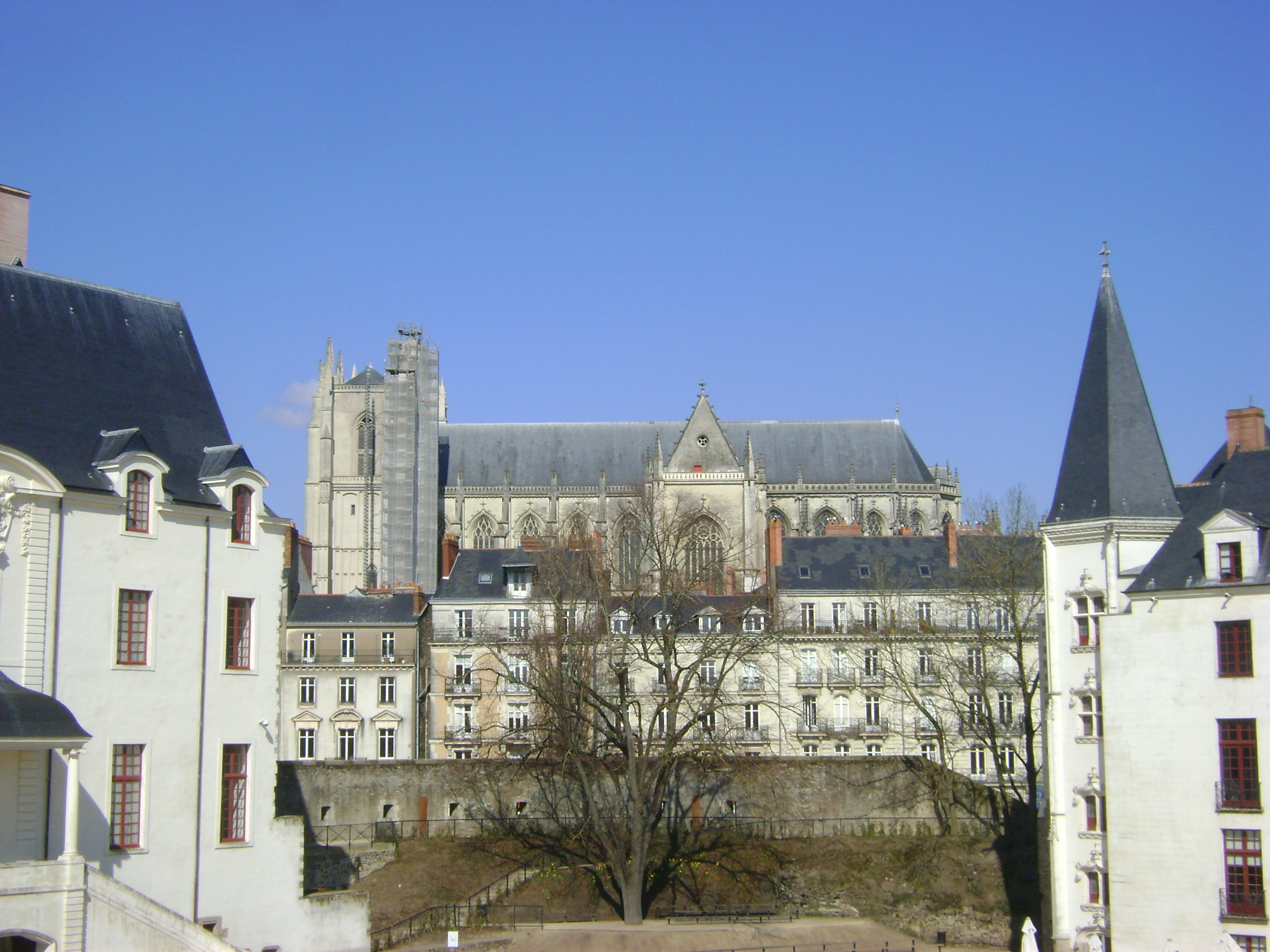
Cathédrale de Nantes.

== Cardinal of Felix V ==
The antipope Felix V created him a cardinal on 12 November 1440 and he died on 13 September 1443.

== Successor ==
He was succeeded by his nephew William, who was bishop from 14 June 1443 till 1461. William was the son of Jean's brother William of Malestroit and his wife Margaret of Quintin. William had been dean of Saint-Malo, when he succeeded his uncle but was considered authoritarian and awkward. He resigned his post at the end of the year 1461 and became Archbishop of Thessalonica, due it is claimed to his refusal to make the oath of allegiance to the Duke. He died on 17 August 1491.
