= Mathurin Rodier =

Mathurin Rodier or Mathelin Rodier was a French architect born around 1410 and died around 1484. He was the architect of the Saint-Pierre-et-Saint-Paul of Nantes Cathedral for at least 36 years, starting no later than 1444 and ending no earlier than 1480.

== Biography ==
The information regarding Mathurin Rodier (also known as Mathelin Rodier) is fragmentary. We know he was coming to Nantes from Tours, where he had a brother, Jean Rodier, and that in 1484, he was married to Édeline Ponset

Il travaille sur le chantier de la cathédrale Saint-Gatien de Tours under the direction of Jean de Dammartin between 1431 and 1434, to a position equivalent to that of Jean Benoist and Huguet of Dammartin, son of Jean. Before 1444 he went to Nantes, where he took charge of several building sites, on the Saint-Nicolas gate, the Basilique Saint-Nicolas de Nantes, the cathedral, the Château des ducs de Bretagne, the Collégiale Notre-Dame de Nantes.

The presence of Mathurin Rodier at the head of the Nantes cathedral site is attested in 1444, with the charge of maistre masson. Most of the few writings concerning him still preserved relate to his emoluments. While managing the site, he was obliged to perform periods of city guard (according to a 1468 text), an obligation instituted by the municipality. A document from 1477 shows that Rodier was exempted from this charge in return for payment.

In 1480 the canons in charge of supervising the building site decided to add Jean Le Maître to Mathurin Rodier, then approximately 70 years old. His ageing is undoubtedly the cause of this novelty, and in the same year the load of the building site was withdrawn, at the end of a remarkably long period for the time. The last written record of Rodier is of an anniversary he and his wife celebrated at Saint-Laurent Church on August 6 or 9, 1484. So he died after that date, most likely in Nantes.

== Works ==
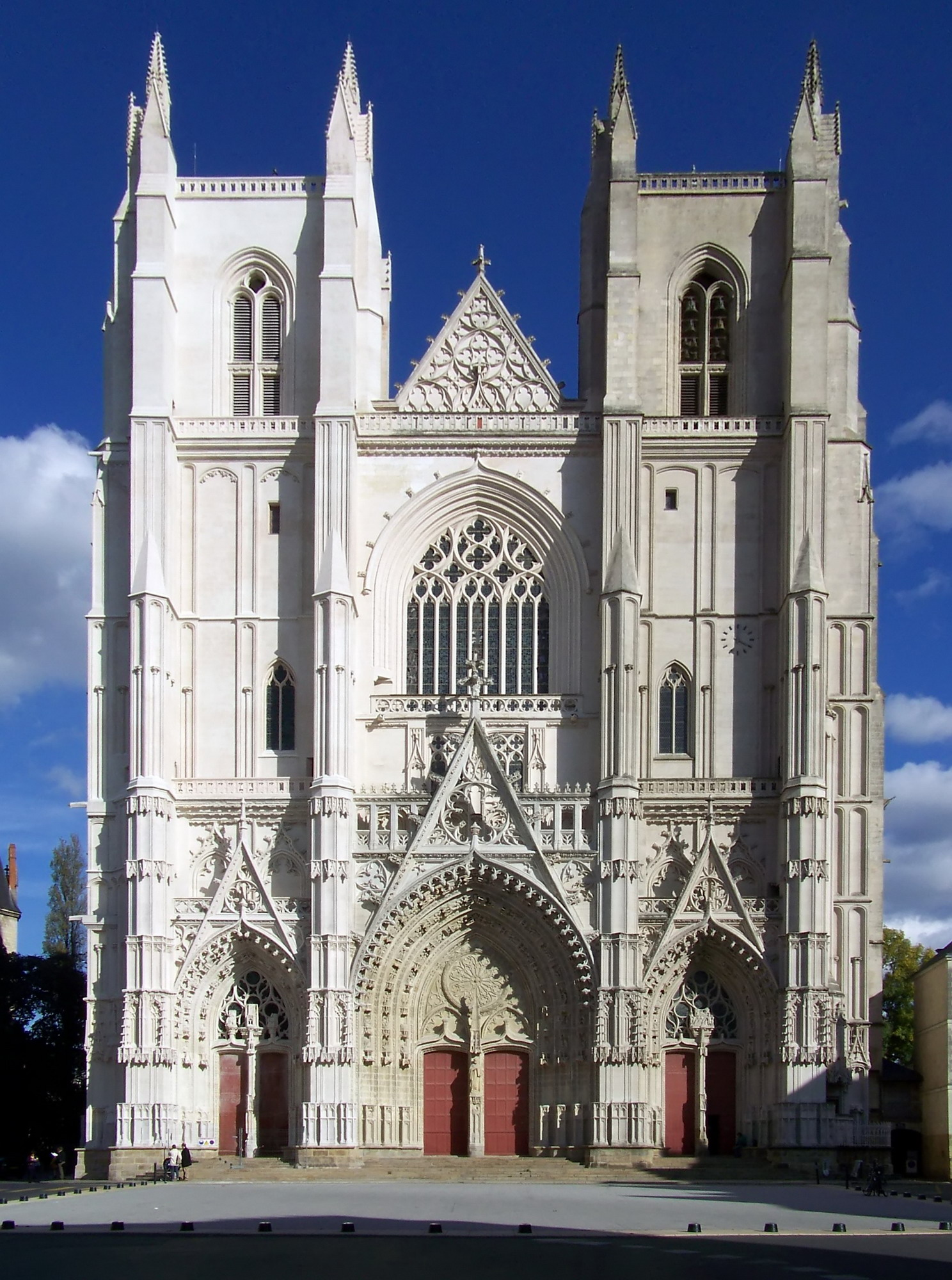
The façade of Nantes cathedral. The towers were not completed when Rodier ceased to practice.

As main contractor:

- Nantes Cathedral

Other participations:

- Cathédrale Saint-Gatien of Tours
- Château des ducs de Bretagne
- Porte Saint-Nicolas (Nantes)
- Basilique Saint-Nicolas de Nantes
- Collégiale Notre-Dame de Nantes

== Bibliography ==
- Guillouët, Jean-Marie (2003). Les Portails de la cathédrale de Nantes; un grand programme sculpté du XVe et son public. Art et société (in French). Rennes: Presses Universitaires de Rennes. p. 303. ISBN 2-86847-791-7.

== See also ==
- Gothic architecture
