= Société populaire de Nantes =

The Sociétés populaires de Nantes were bodies established in Nantes during the French Revolution, equivalent to political parties, in support of the revolution.

The most important was the Club de la Halle, which was linked to the Jacobin Club in Paris.

They ceased to exist during the Directory
