= Nantes Cathedral =

Cathedral located in Loire-Atlantique, in France

Cathedral of Saint Pierre and Saint Paul Cathédrale Saint-Pierre-et-Saint-Paul
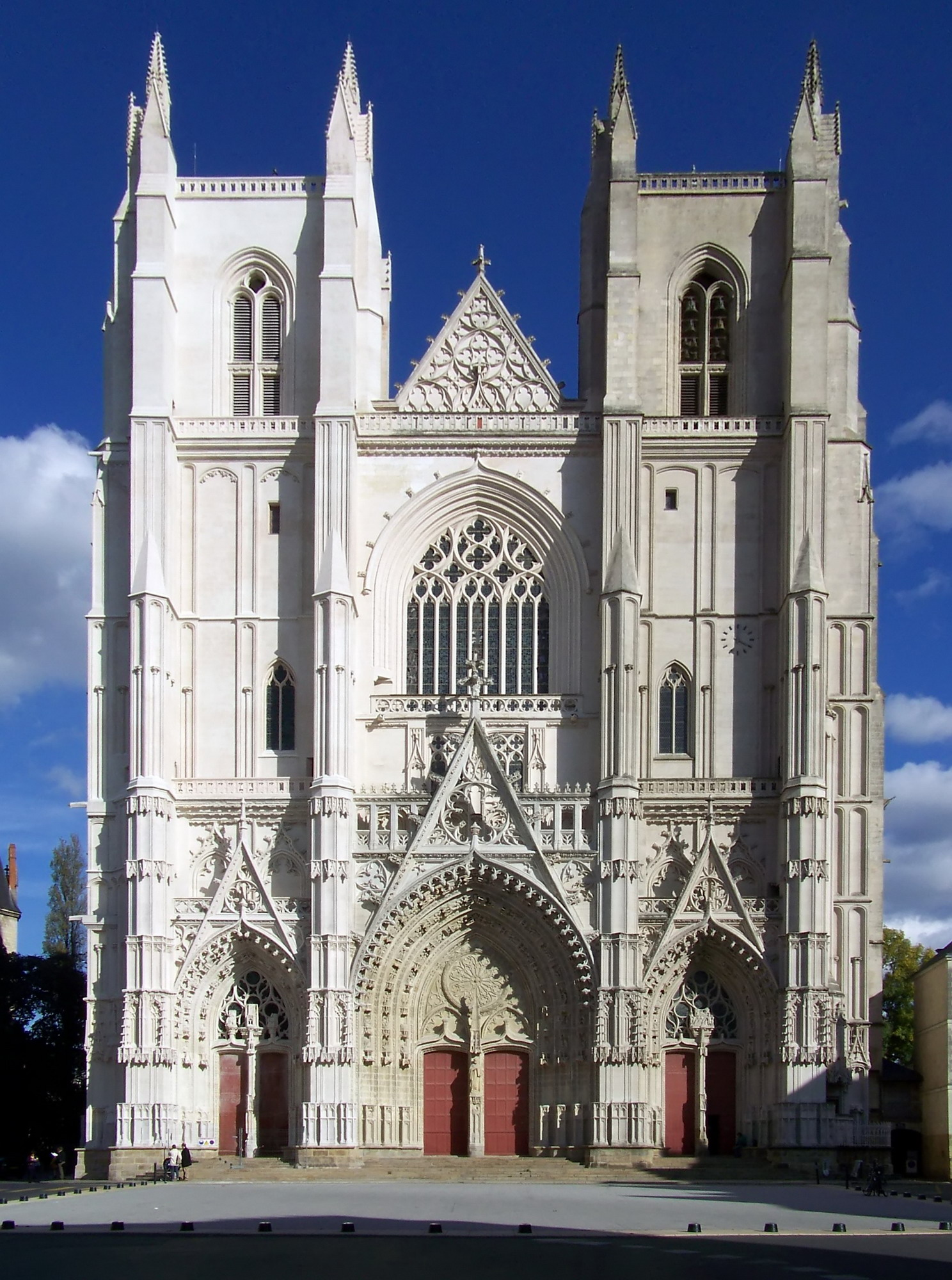
- Nantes Cathedral

Religion
- Affiliation: Roman Catholic Church
- Province: Diocese of Nantes
- Rite: Roman
- Ecclesiastical or organisational status: Cathedral
- Status: Completed

Location
- Location: Nantes, France
- Interactive map of Cathedral of Saint Pierre and Saint Paul; Cathédrale Saint-Pierre-et-Saint-Paul
- Coordinates: 47.2180°N 1.5508°W

Architecture
- Type: Church
- Style: Gothic (Late Gothic Flamboyant), Romanesque
- Groundbreaking: 1434
- Completed: 1891

Nantes Cathedral, or the Cathedral of St. Peter and St. Paul of Nantes (French: Cathédrale Saint-Pierre-et-Saint-Paul de Nantes; Breton: Iliz-veur Sant Pêr ha Sant Paol Naoned), is a Roman Catholic Gothic cathedral located in Nantes, Pays de la Loire, France. Construction began in 1434, on the site of a Romanesque cathedral, and took 457 years to finish in 1891. It has been listed since 1862 as a monument historique by the French Ministry of Culture.

== Background ==
The reconstruction of the cathedral commenced in the early to mid-15th century at a time when Nantes and Brittany were commercially prosperous, initiating such large-scale architectural projects on a wide scale, partly owing to the opportunist and skilful diplomatic policy of John V, Duke of Brittany in a period of political turmoil and conflict with England.

== History ==
The cathedral's foundation stone was laid on 14 April 1434, by John V, Duke of Brittany and Jean de Malestroit, Bishop of Nantes (1417–1443). The first architect in charge was Guillaume de Dammartin who was later replaced by Mathurin Rodier. The construction began with the west façade, the aisles of the nave and its lateral chapels.

Leniaud et al. divide the building process in five phases. The first phase took place between c. 1434 and c. 1470. In this period the west façade and the tower bay were built, as were the south aisle of the nave with its chapels, and the south arcade pillars. The bases of those pillars resemble the ones of the choir of Mont-Saint-Michel, which was begun after 1444. The arms of Duke John, who died in 1442, were placed in the staircase to the balcony, above the ducal portal, on the south side of the southern tower bay. The vaults in the belfry of that tower were decorated with the arms of Bishop Guillaume de Malestroit (1443–1462). The triforium of the tower bay was constructed in an earlier and different style (Late Gothic Flamboyant, with a network of reticulated tracery) than the style of the nave proper. Bronze decoration of the central portal's doors was undertaken in 1482.

The second phase took place from c. 1470 to c. 1490. During this time the nave, the north aisle and its chapels were built. They were completed by 1485 or slightly later. The west wall of the north transept and the north-west crossing pier, perhaps up to capital height, were also constructed in this period.

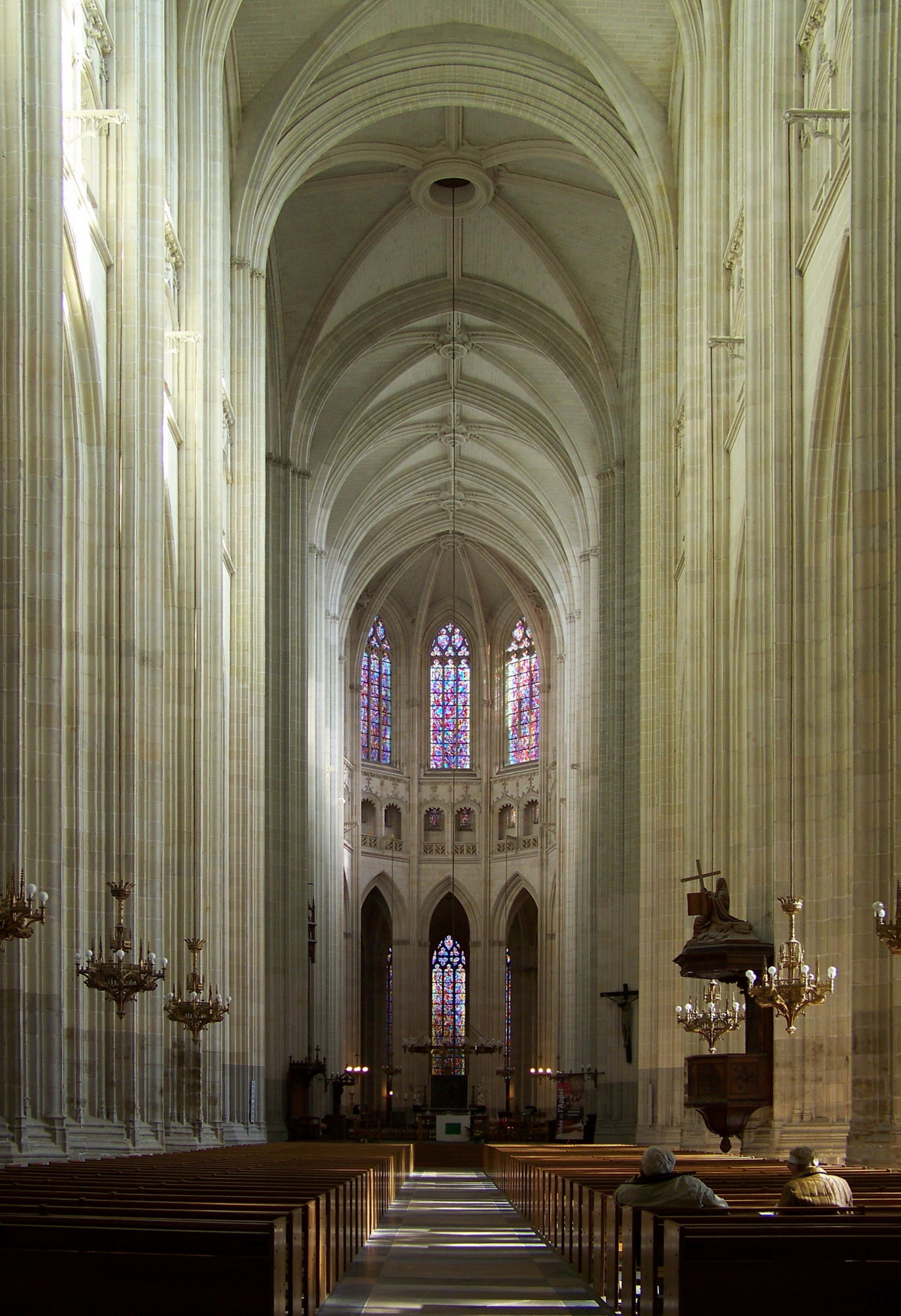
The nave

In the third phase, c. 1500–1516, the glass in the great west window was installed (1498), as a gift from Queen Anne. In 1500 took place the vaulting of the first bay of the nave. From 1508 to 1516 the eastern bay of the south aisle of the nave and its chapel was completed and vaulted; the south transept was begun, finishing most of the upper parts of its western wall by 1519–1520. The financial support came from Bishop Guillaume Guegen and the architect was Jacques Drouet.

The last phase is the post-medieval one. It spanned from c. 1626 to 1630 and led to the completion of the nave high vaulting (four eastern bays) and the construction of the nave flyers. The south transept was completed sometime between 1631 and 1637 or perhaps later, in a sympathetic Gothic style. Louis Le Vau recommended to the Chapter at Nantes, in about 1650, to build the choir in a Gothic style.

The rest of the north transept and the choir, under the direction of St. Felix Seheult (city architect), were finished between 1840 and 1891, at a time of keen revival of the Catholic faith. The long wait was also due to the fact that the former Romanesque church was standing right next to the city's protective walls, which had to be taken down before completing the choir, while destroying the remains of the previous cathedral as it was covered by the larger, new one.

The edifice was damaged by Allied bombing during World War II, on 15 June 1944. On 28 January 1972, a gigantic fire started on the roof, believed to have been caused by a workman's blow torch. Firemen managed to bring it under control, but the timber frame was severely damaged and many other damages were inflicted. This event led to a complete interior restoration of a cathedral.

The elevation and the regularity of the plan of the cathedral are French. Still the majority of the details are Late Gothic, e.g., the absence of capitals, the plinths with concave sides and separated bases for the shafts, the Flamboyant tracery, and the masking of the piers by shafts.

=== 2020 fire ===
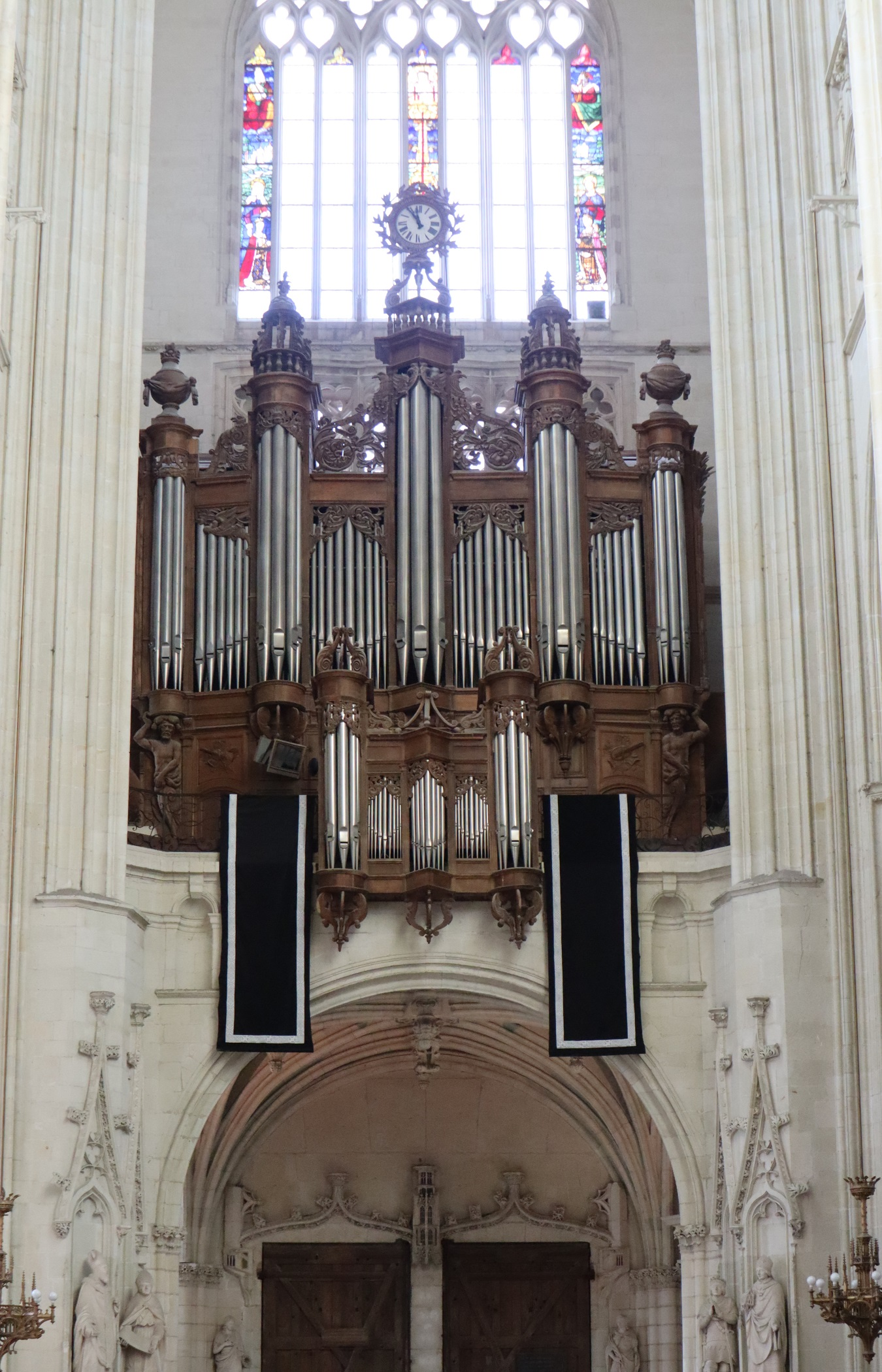
The main cathedral organ and stained glass, both destroyed by the 2020 fire

In the early hours of 18 July 2020, a fire broke out in three parts of the cathedral, one concentrated on the main organ (grand orgue) at the west end, originally built by Jacques Girardet in 1621, which was destroyed, a second near a smaller organ to the left of the altar and the third to the right of the altar. Around 100 firefighters tackled the blaze. Police investigated the incident as a possible act of arson. Fire Chief Laurent Ferlay reported that the cathedral sustained less damage than Notre-Dame de Paris did in its 2019 fire.

After the fire, a 39-year-old church volunteer, Emmanuel Abayisenga, a Rwandan illegal immigrant who had lived in France since 2012, was detained for questioning but released without charge. However, he was later re-arrested and confessed to setting the fire; he was charged with arson. His lawyer told a newspaper that his client "bitterly regrets" his actions.

On 9 August 2021, Abayisenga murdered 60-year-old priest Olivier Maire in Saint-Laurent-sur-Sèvre, and was again arrested after surrendering himself at a local police station. He was being housed by the priest at the time of the murder, and for several months previously. The French Bishops' Conference issued a statement, in which they stated “The author of this killing, who handed himself in to the gendarmes, was being sheltered by Fr Maire”. Maire was the provincial superior of a religious order, the Company of Mary, and was housing the arson suspect in the community's mission house at the time of the murder.

== Architecture ==
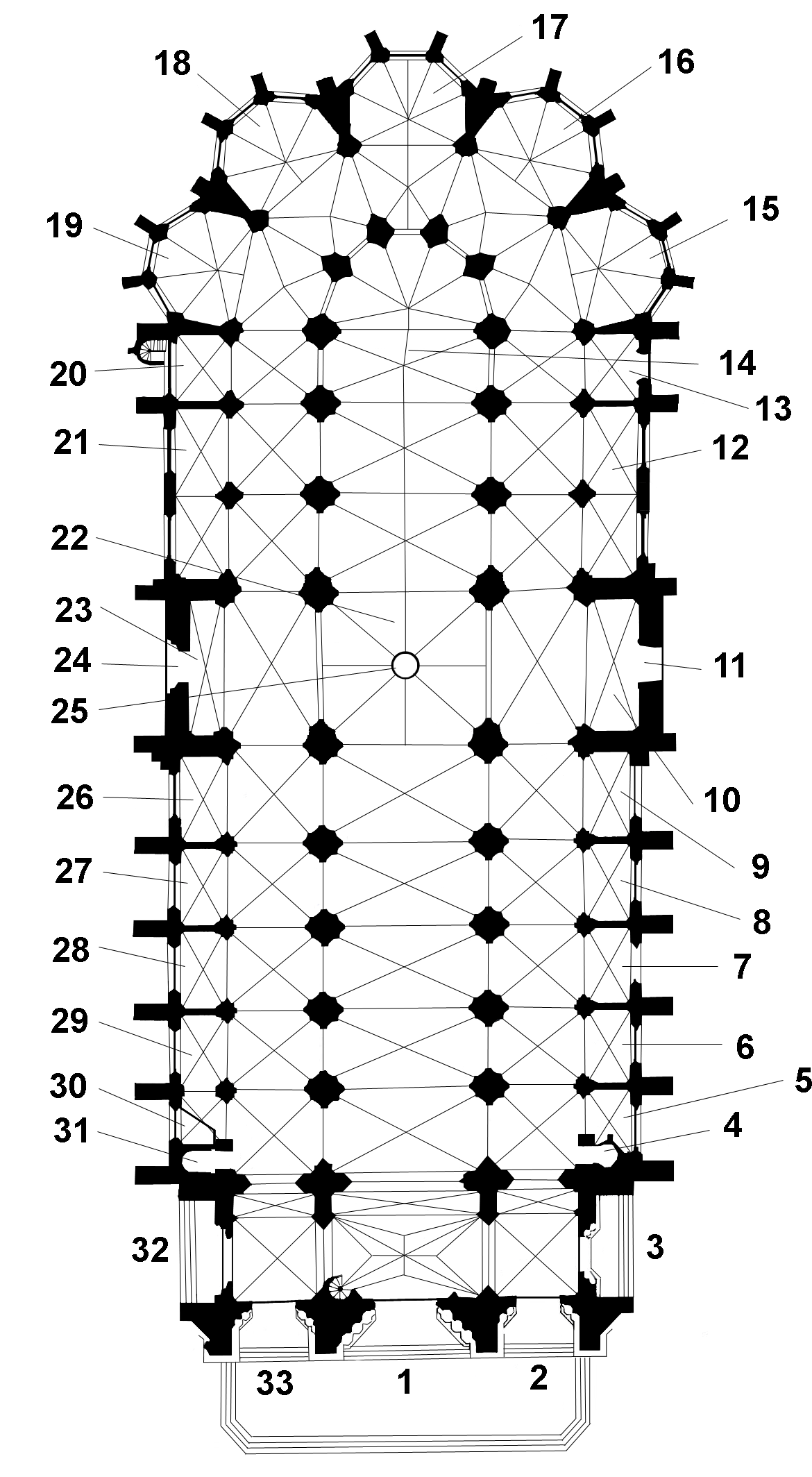
Ground plan of the cathedral

=== Dimensions ===
- Height of the towers – 63 m (192 ft)
- Height of the roof – 49 m (149 ft)
- Height of nave – 37.5 m (114 ft)
- Interior width – 38.5 m (117 ft)
- Interior length – 103 m (335 ft)
- Length of the chancel – 30 m (91 ft)

=== Exterior ===
The facade of the Cathedral of Nantes is dominated by two large towers, stretching up above the top terrace. It presents several remarkable characteristics, e.g., (1) the presence of an external pulpit, designed to preach to the crowd assembled on the square, and (2) the presence of five richly decorated gates, three of them on the façade and two to the sides (see Ground plan, positions 1 – Main Gate, 2 – Gate of St. Paul, 3 – Gate of St. Yves, 32 – Gate of St. Donatien and St. Rogatien and 33 – Gate of St. Peter).

=== Interior ===
The plain façade is largely compensated for by the polish of the interior of the building. The whiteness of the stone, accentuated by recent restoration work, the imposing dimensions of the nave and the aisles and the effect of the immense inner column create a Gothic atmosphere inside the cathedral.

Inside the cathedral are the tomb of Francis II, Duke of Brittany (position 10) and of his wife Marguerite de Foix, the (parents of Anne of Brittany), made at the beginning of the 16th century by Michel Colombe and Jean Perréal. The cathedral also houses the cenotaph of General de Lamoricière (position 23), a monument set up in 1878 in papal homage to him.

== Gallery ==
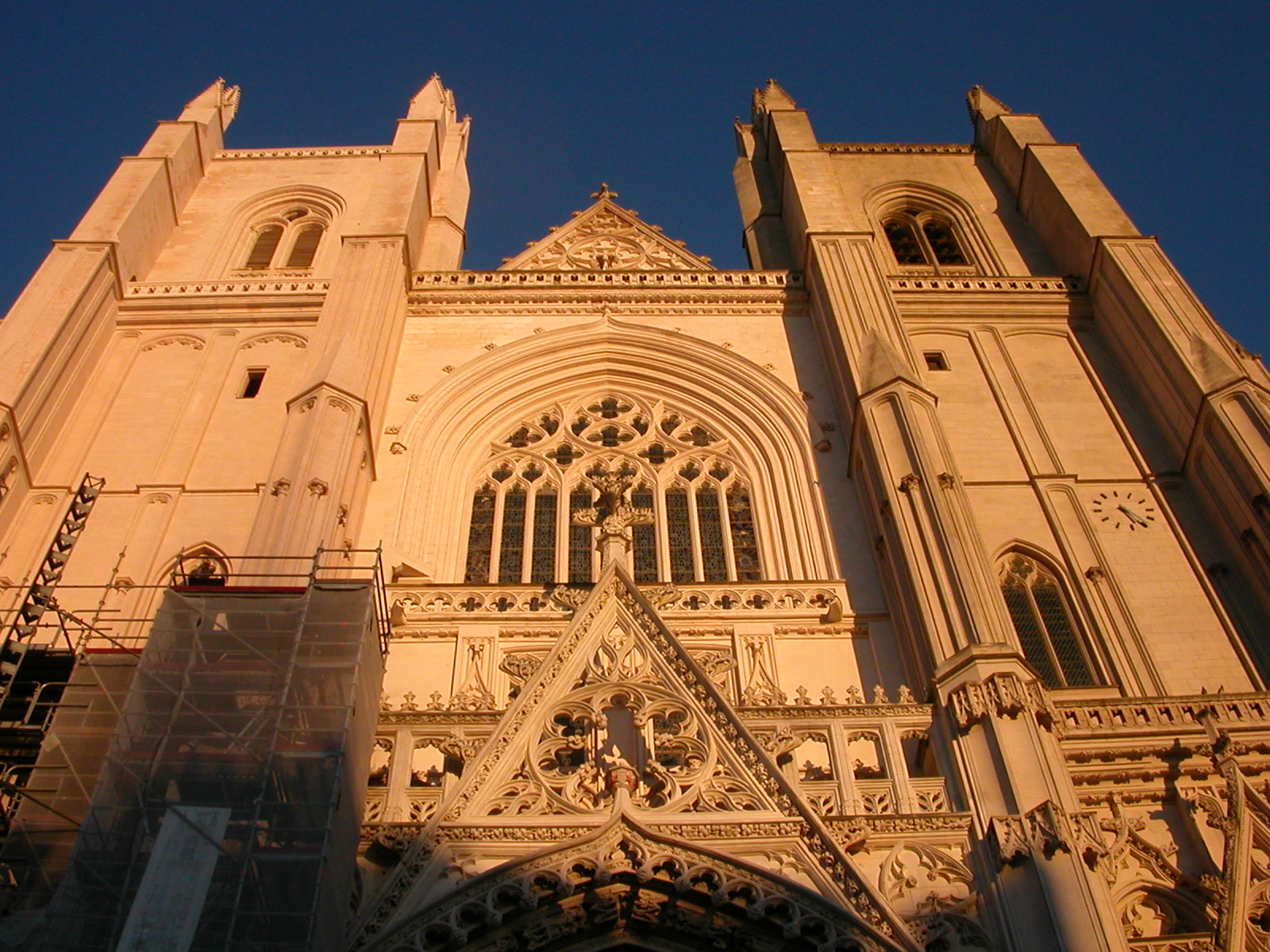
Façade of Nantes Cathedral (January 2008). The north tower is a different colour because of the restoration work in process.

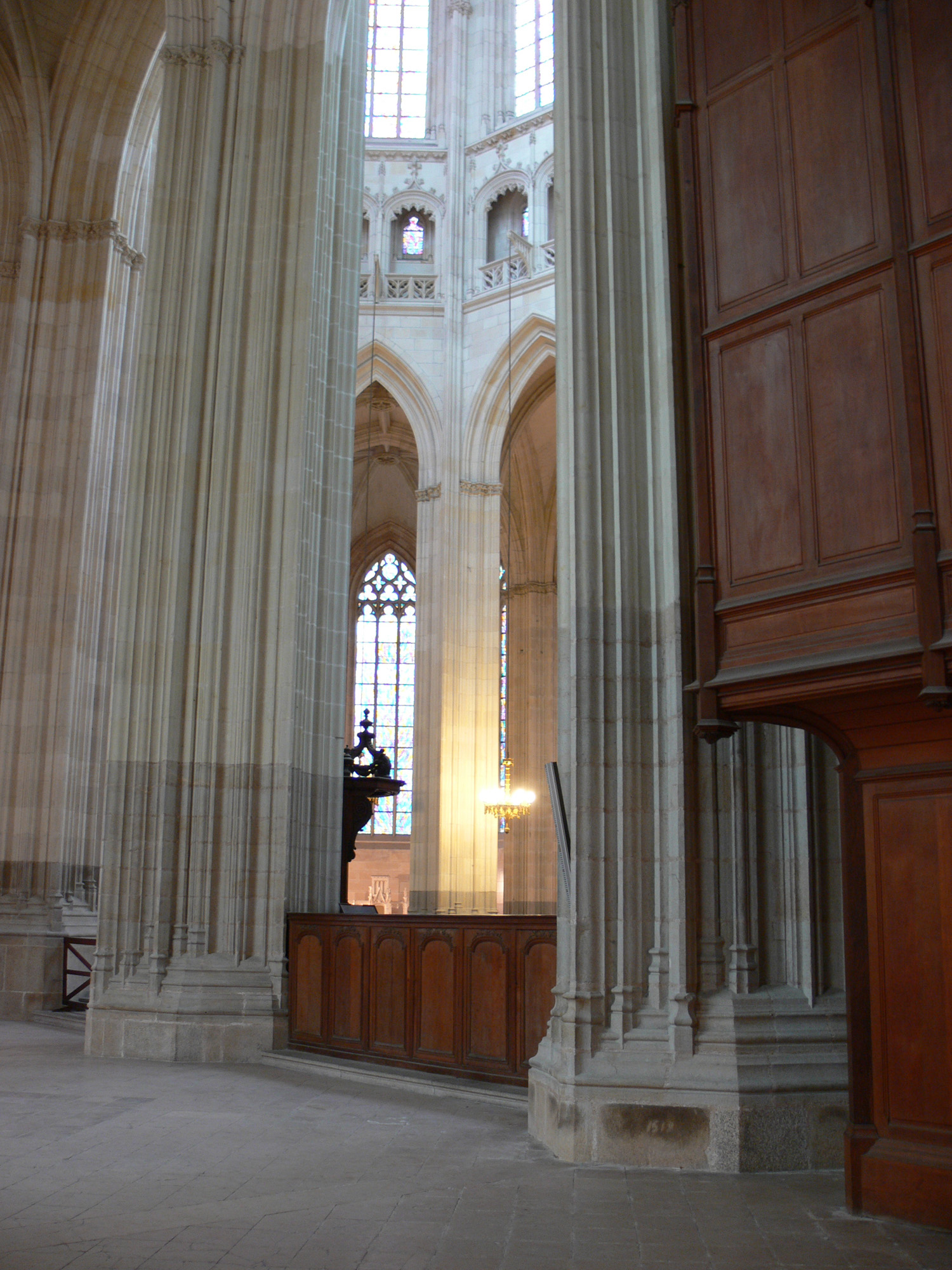
Nantes Cathedral. The column bases show the typical features of the late Gothic period.

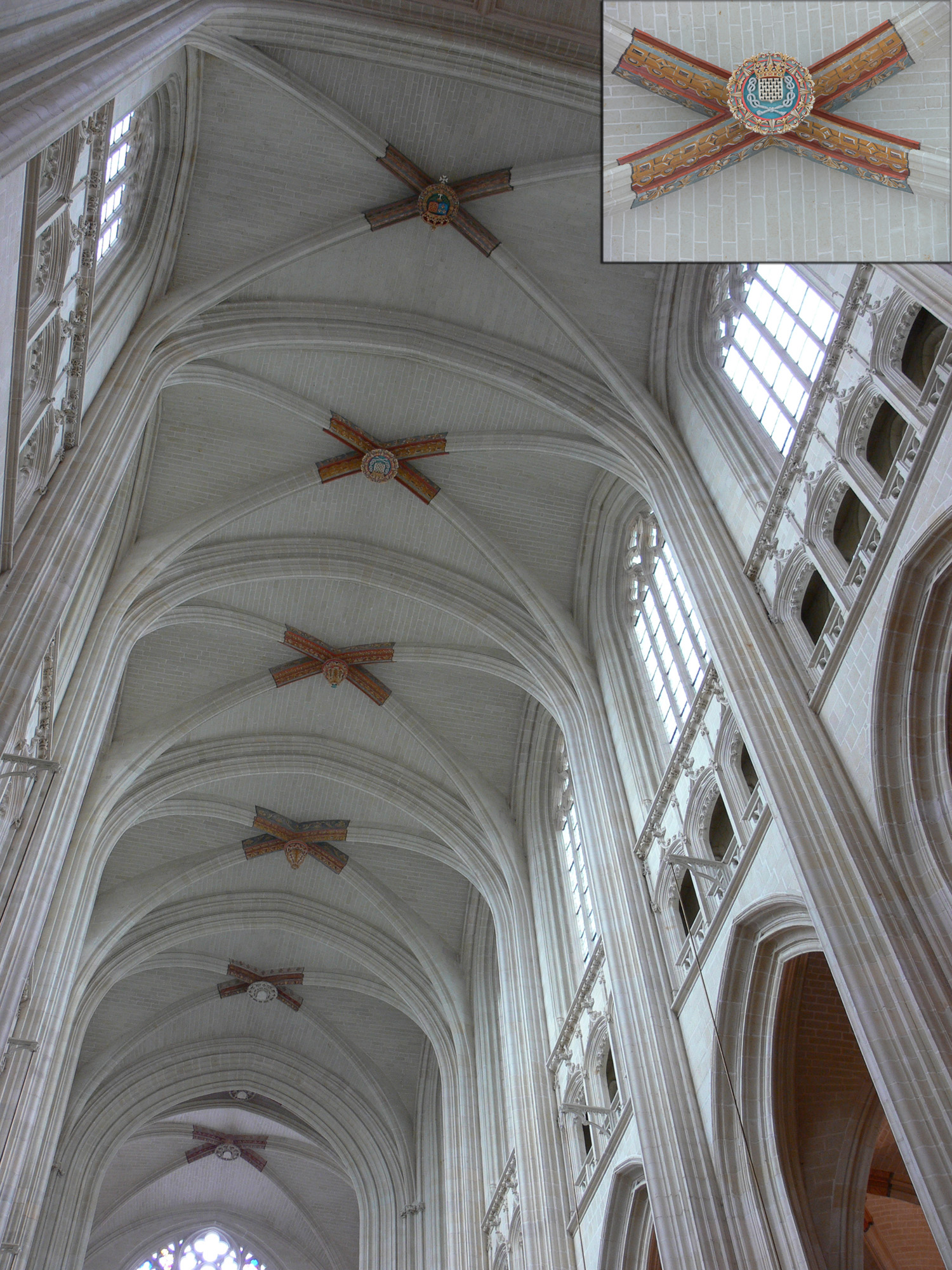
Nantes Cathedral, ornaments on the vault of the nave

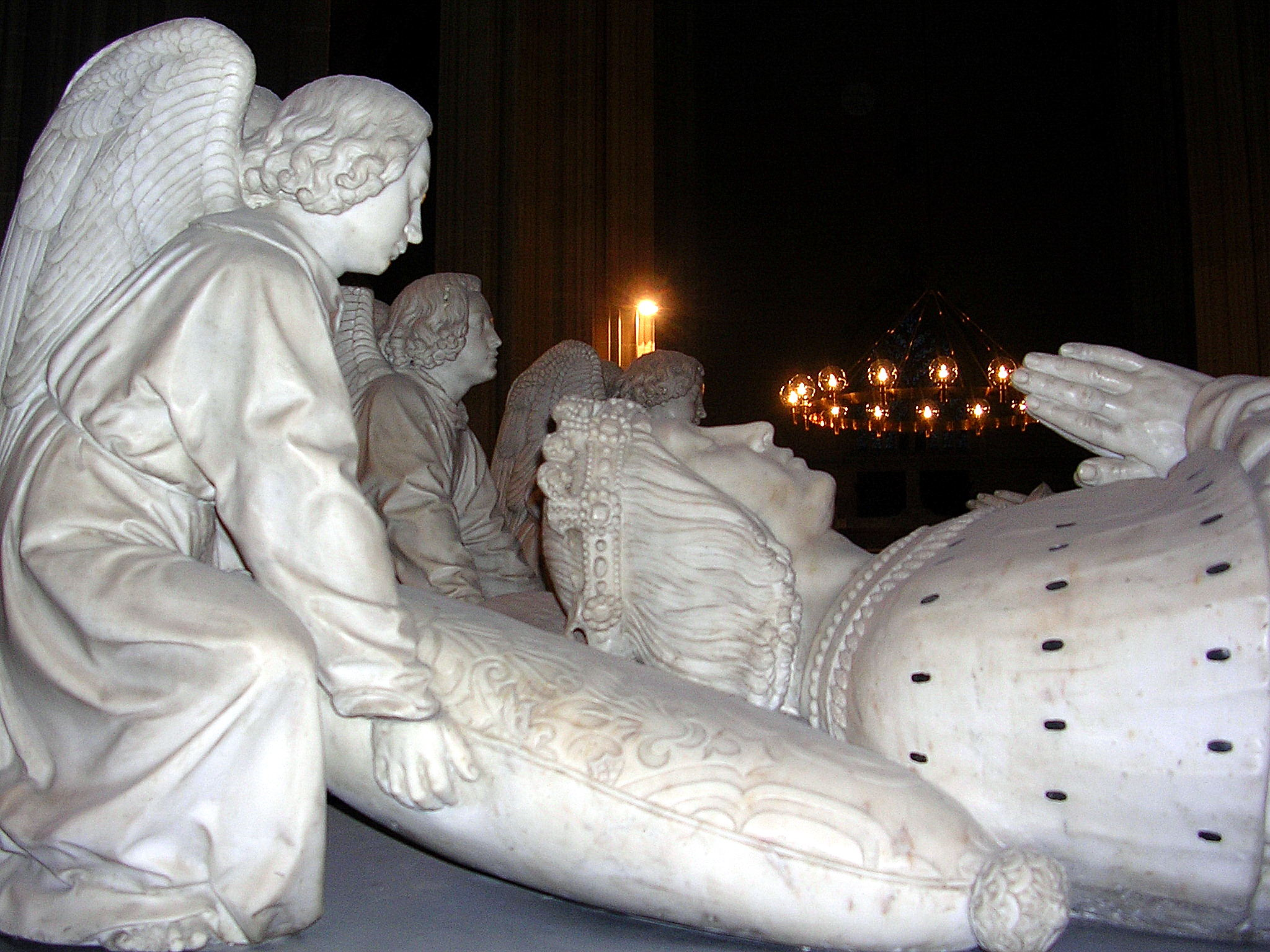
Tomb of Francis II, Duke of Brittany

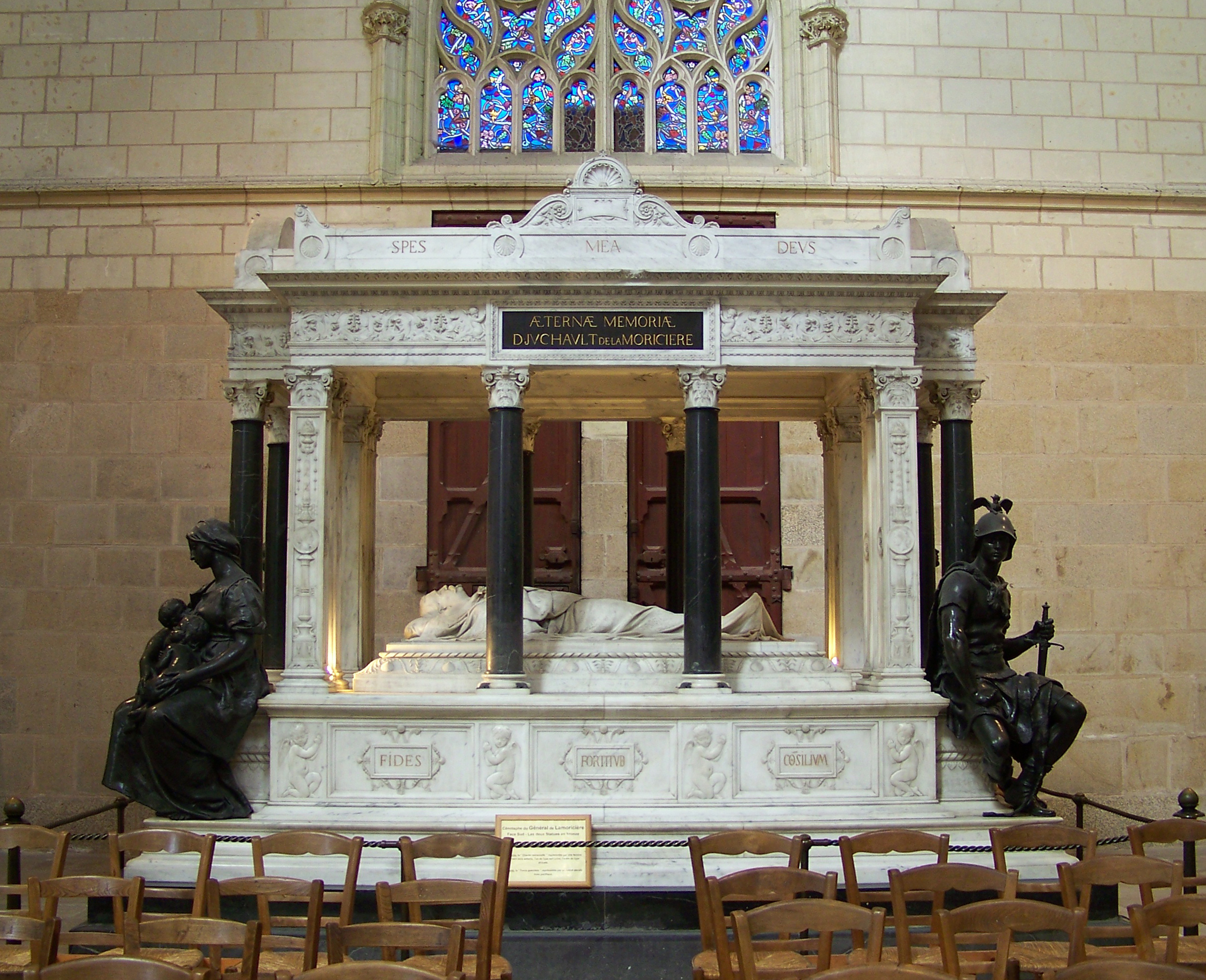
Cenotaph of the general de Lamoricière

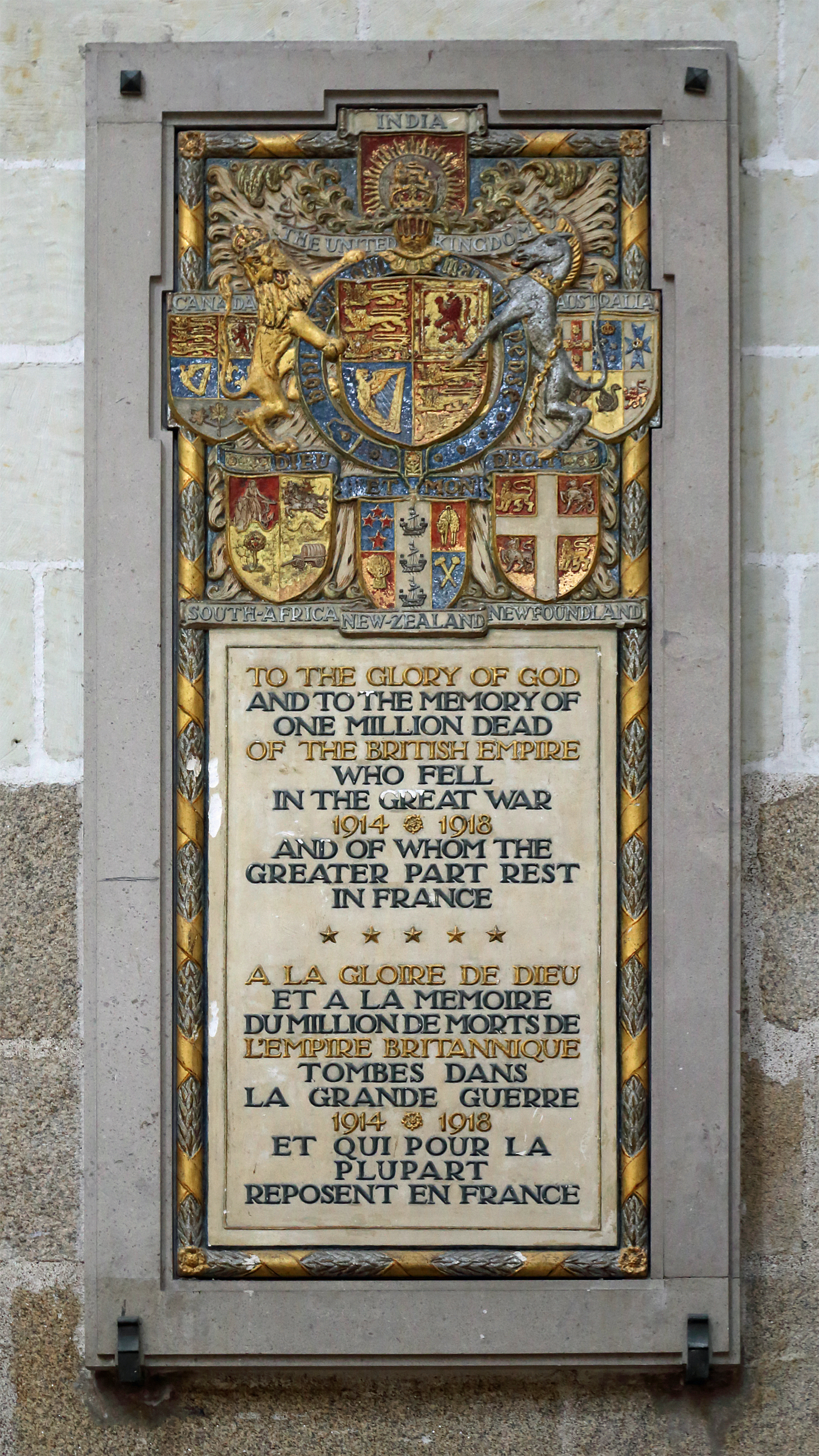
British World War I memorial tablet inside the cathedral

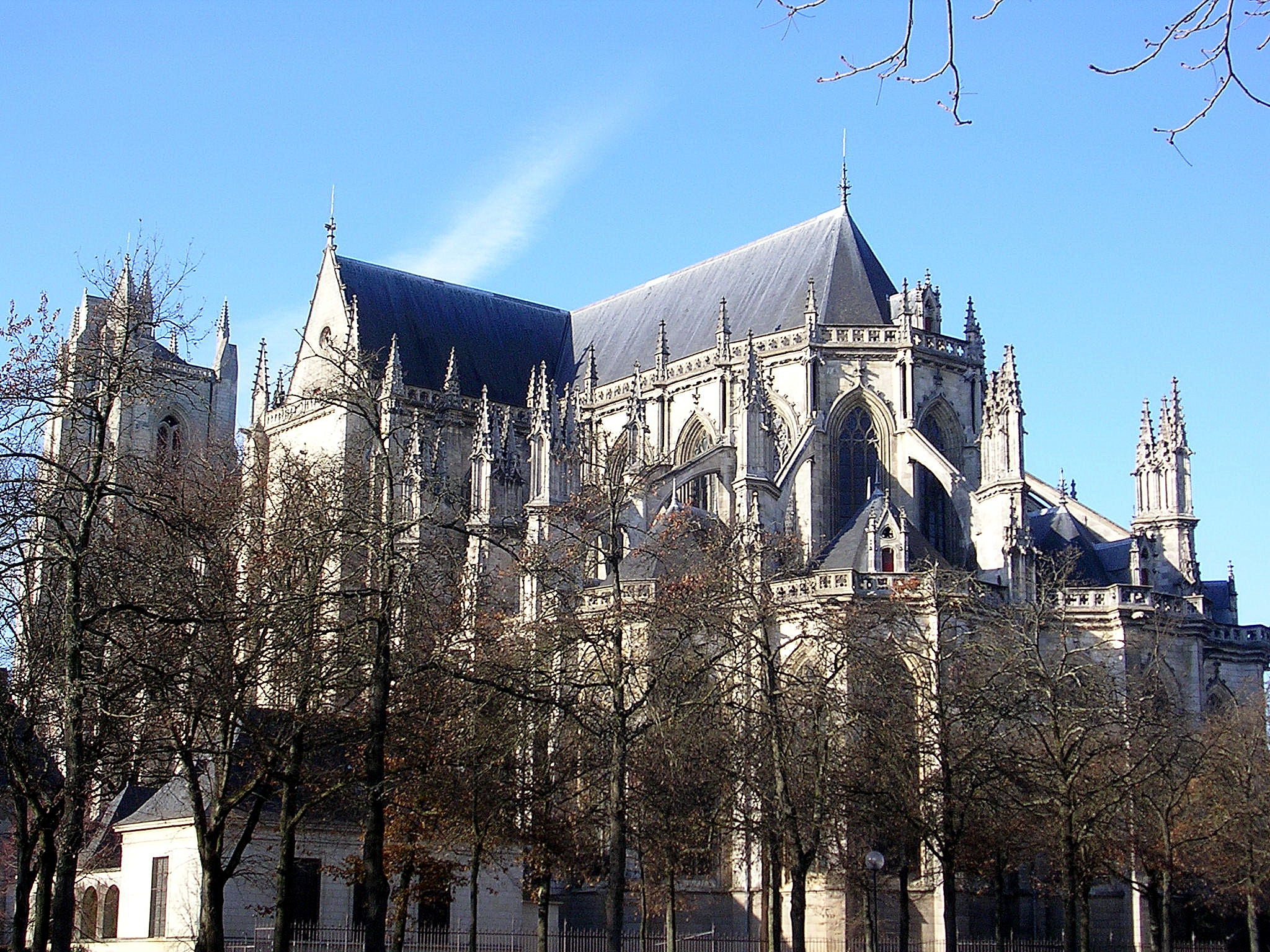
Nantes Cathedral, exterior view from the side of the choir

== See also ==
- Saint-Pierre gate, Nantes
