= Port of Nantes =

French commercial port

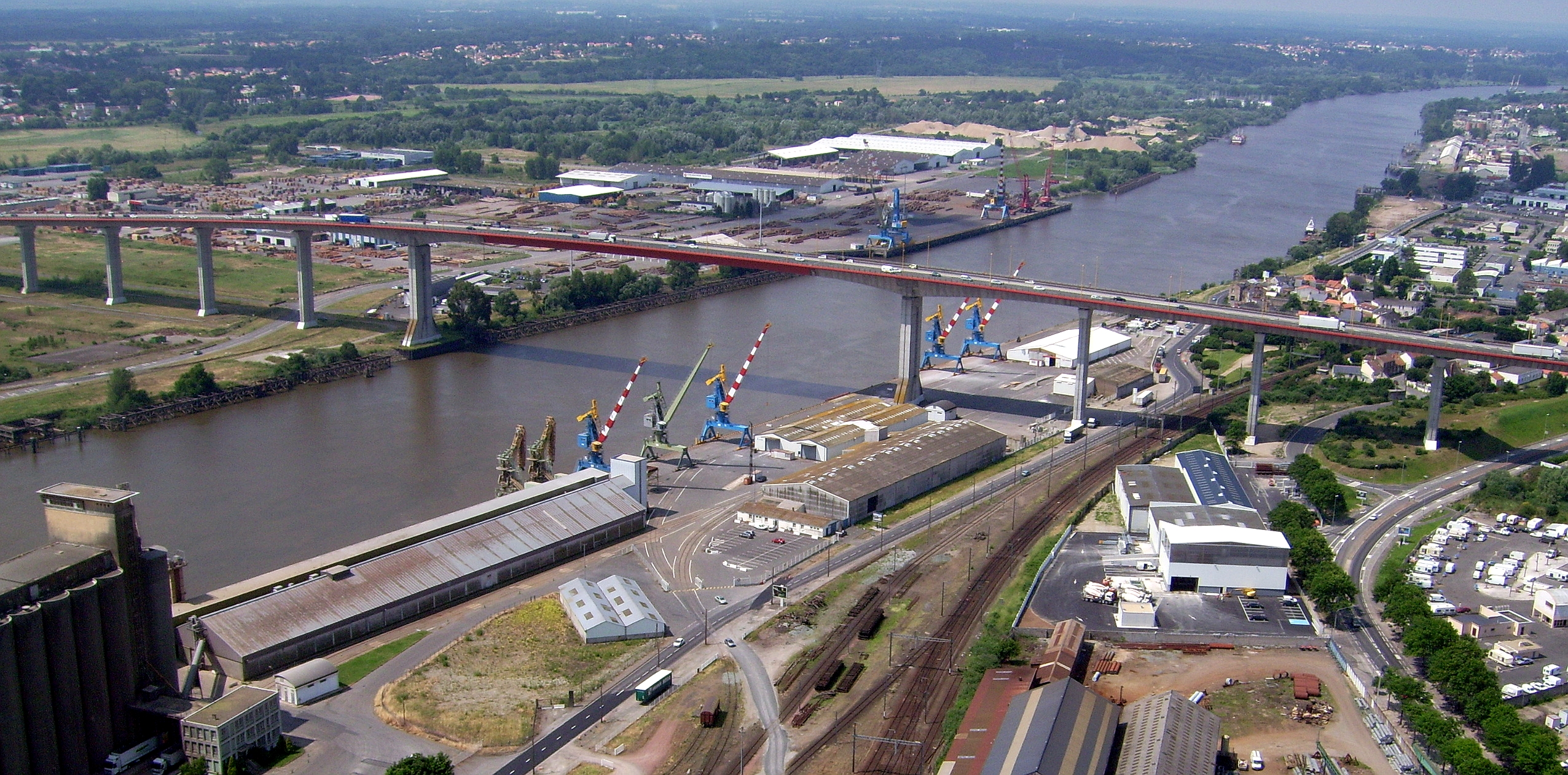
- Port terminals at Roche-Maurice (foreground) and Cheviré (background)
- Interactive map of Port of Nantes

Location
- Country: France
- Location: Nantes, Loire-Atlantique, Pays de la Loire
- Coordinates: 47°11′22″N 1°36′59″W

Details
- Type of Harbor: Port
- Status: Major seaport
- Activities: Port handling

The Port of Nantes (Breton: Porzh Naoned) is a commercial port on the innermost part of the Loire estuary. This name refers to the facilities of the Grand Port Maritime of Nantes-Saint-Nazaire that are in Nantes, in the French department of Loire-Atlantique, and are intended to receive commercial vessels for port handling operations.

== Overview ==
The two main sites of the Port of Nantes are the Cheviré terminals (a Nantes enclave on the left bank of the Loire, at the foot of the bridge bearing the same name) and the Roche-Maurice terminals on the right bank, both in the Bellevue – Chantenay – Sainte-Anne district. Relatively unknown to the general public due to their distance from downtown Nantes, these industrial-port zones nevertheless account for 10% of the traffic of the Grand Port Maritime of Nantes Saint-Nazaire, amounting to about 3 million tons of goods handled per year (wood, peat, scrap metal, sand, wine at Cheviré; cereals and fertilizers at Roche-Maurice, among others). It also includes the Émile-Cormerais quay on the right bank of the river in Saint-Herblain, mainly used for importing liquid bulk goods (oils, molasses).

=== Access conditions ===
The port facilities are served by a 60-kilometre (37 mi) maritime channel. The allowable drafts vary depending on the tidal coefficients. For 98% of tides, an allowable draft of 8.40 metres (27 ft 7 in) is available in the Nantes channel. The turning basin has a diameter of 230 m (750 ft). The air draft under the Cheviré bridge is 52 m (171 ft), which is sufficient to allow the passage of the largest commercial vessels.

=== Cheviré ===
The terminal consists of the Cheviré upstream quay, 305 m (1,001 ft) long, and the Cheviré downstream quay, 350 m (1,150 ft) long. It has two sand berths and a roll-on/roll-off (ro-ro) dock.

Cheviré is the leading hub for imported lumber in France and hosts the country's largest concentration of equipment and professionals in the timber industry. Other types of traffic are handled in this zone, such as recycling products, particularly metals. Cheviré also includes a sand terminal.

The terminal is also an urban logistics platform, next to the Nantes ring road, close to Nantes Atlantique Airport, and directly connected to the road network. It is linked to the rail network and, via the river, to the port terminals of Montoir-de-Bretagne (notably for transporting Airbus aircraft sections by barge), thanks to a ro-ro berth in operation since 2002. The Grand Port Maritime of Nantes Saint-Nazaire has been authorized to directly operate handling equipment at the Cheviré sites starting from 1 January 2023.

The Cheviré coal, gas and oil power station operated here from 1954 to 1986. A 200 MWh / 100 MW grid battery is France's largest as of 2025.

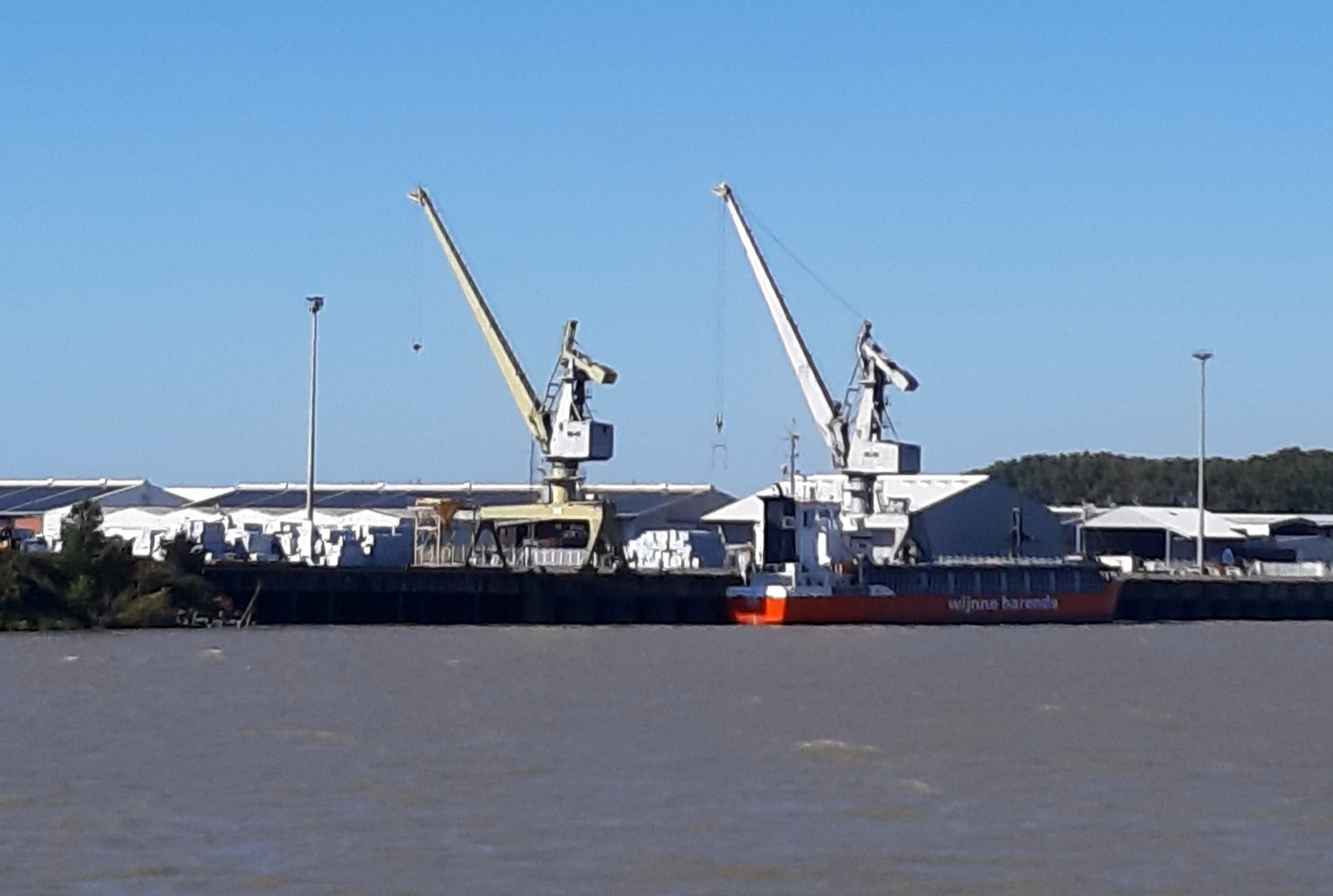
Cheviré Amont terminal, wooden boat in port.

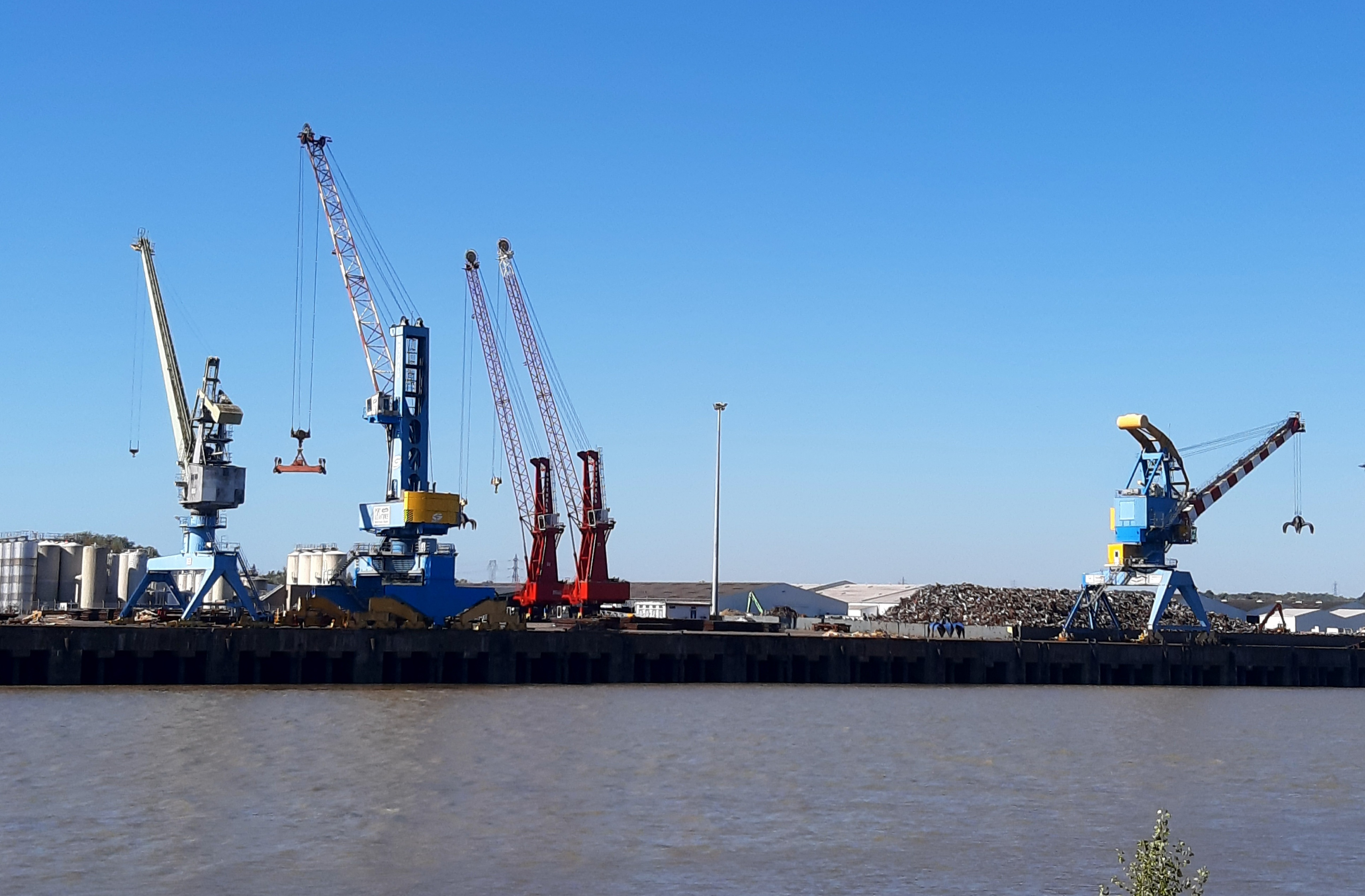
Cheviré Aval terminal.

=== Roche-Maurice ===
The Roche-Maurice terminal faces the Cheviré terminal, on the right bank of the Loire at the foot of the Cheviré bridge. At 750 m (2,460 ft) long, it is one of the main grain depots in western France. On average, just over one million tons of cereals pass through its facilities each year.

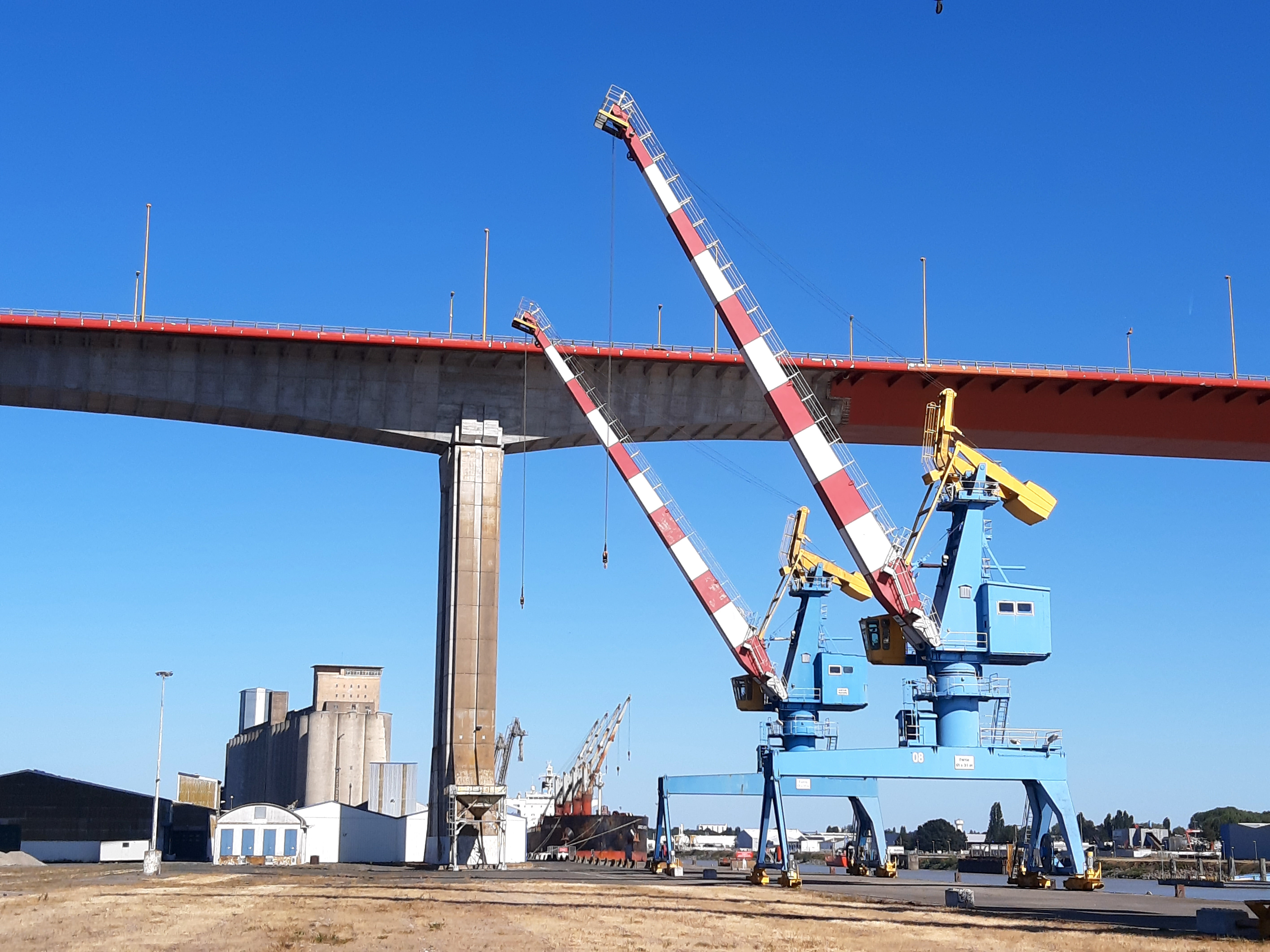
Roche-Maurice terminal, grain cargo ship in port.

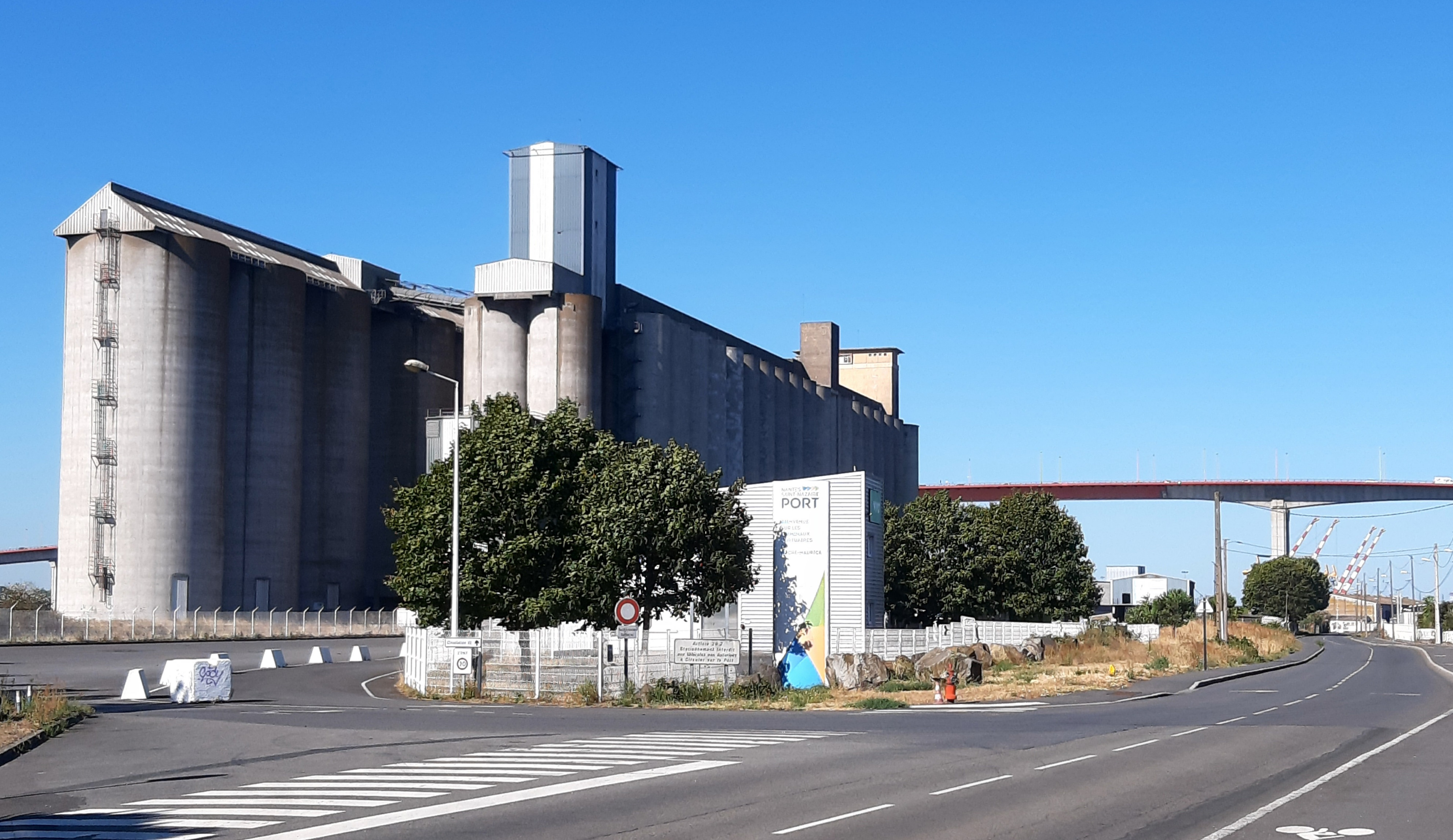
Roche-Maurice terminal, grain silo belonging to the Union Invivo company.

=== Cormerais ===
The Émile-Cormerais port site has two liquid berths that allow for the unloading and storage (behind the quay) of vegetable oil, fish oil, and molasses. It also hosts service activities related to the maritime world (shipyard).

=== Other sites ===
The Port of Nantes also includes quays closer to the city center, which are today closed to maritime traffic due to the shift in activity toward Cheviré and Roche-Maurice. Some still receive boats for various uses:

==== Right bank, upstream to downstream ====
- Fosse Wharf: a key hub of port activity in the 18th and 19th centuries, this quay, 1,100 m (3,600 ft) long (two-thirds of which still border the Loire), permanently hosts the destroyer Maillé-Brézé, and occasionally prestigious visiting ships (Belem, Hermione) or sailing races (such as the start of the Solitaire du Figaro).

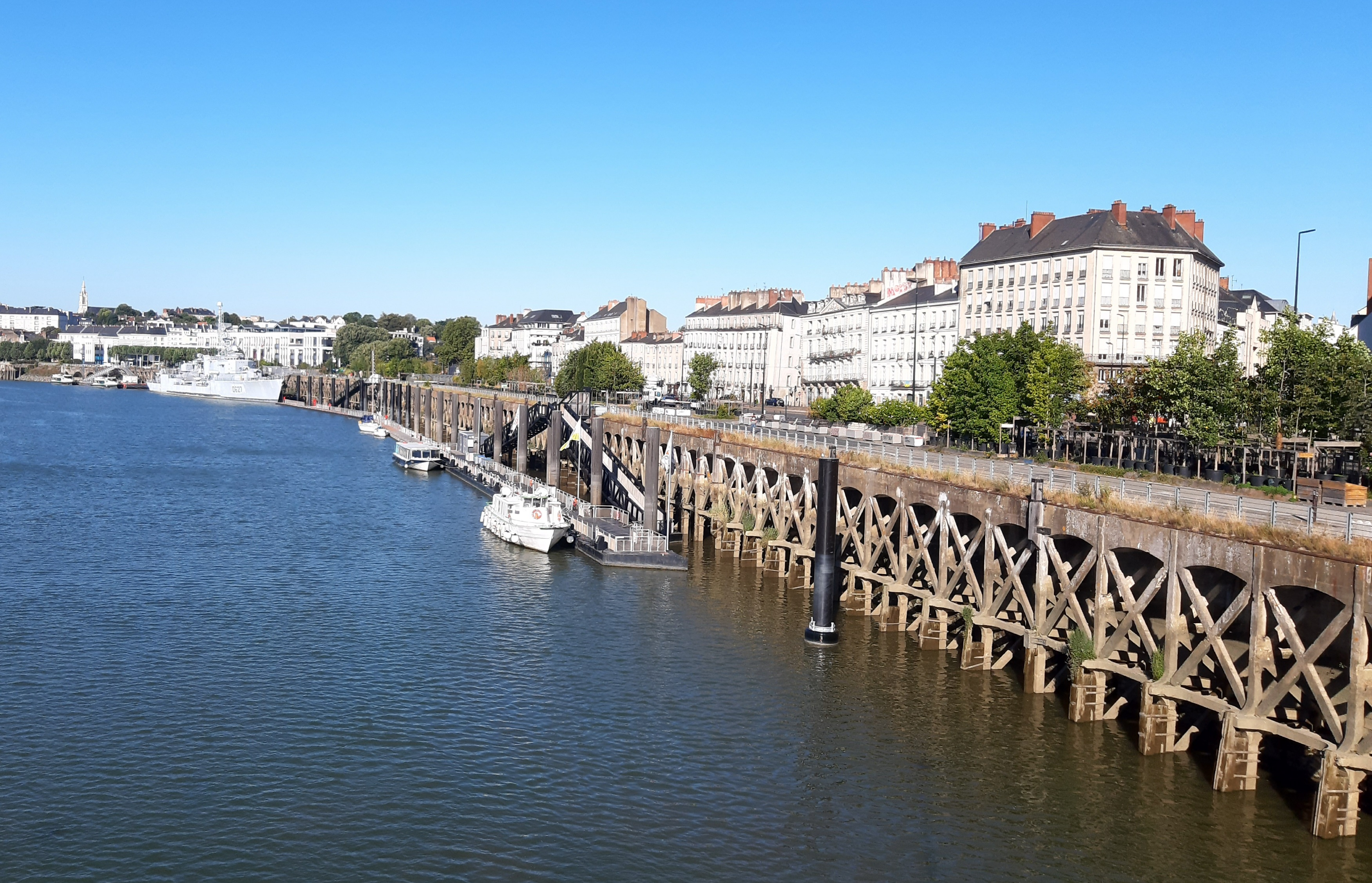
Quai de la Fosse.

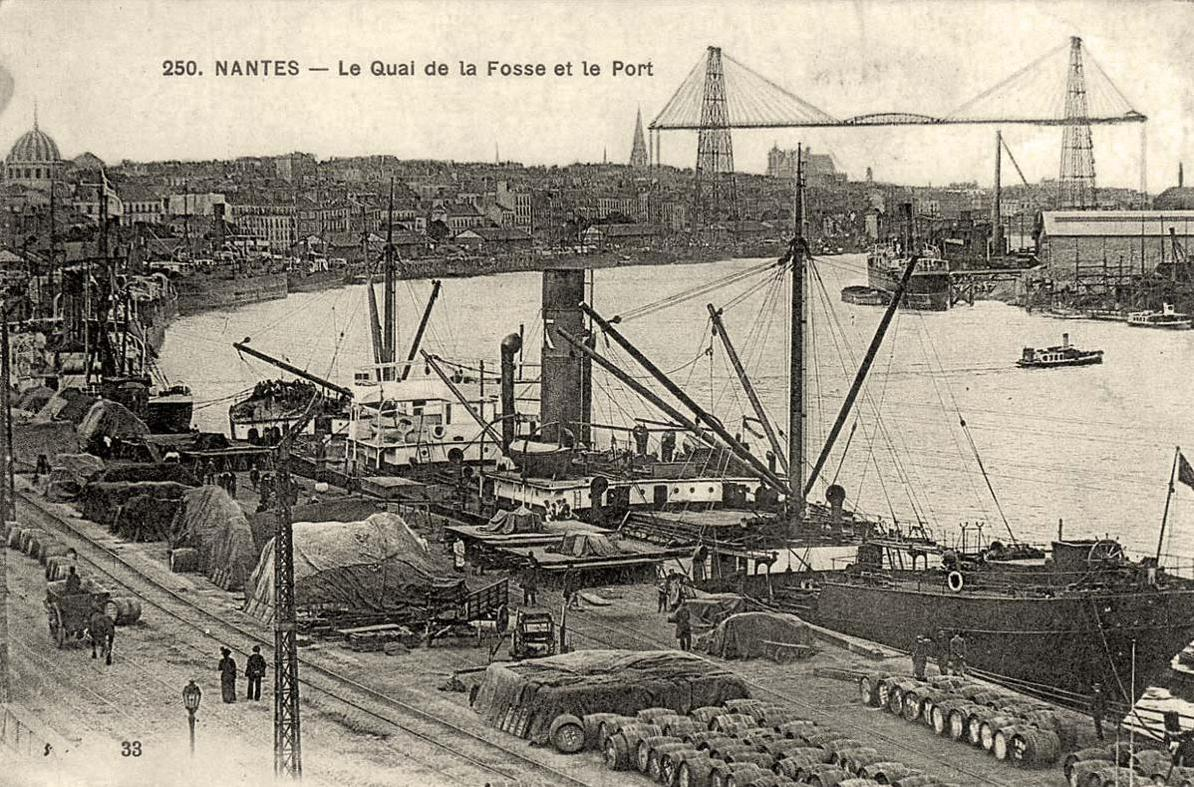
The Quai de la Fosse during its days as a port.

==== Contemporary events ====
- Ernest-Renaud Wharf: On 8 December 1986, the headquarters of the Autonomous Port of Nantes Saint-Nazaire was moved to the Salorges center, (Note: Before this date, the headquarters of the autonomous port were at Place de l'Édit de Nantes in the building now occupied by the Nantes Administrative Court of Appeal.) the result of the rehabilitation of the former hangar 11, built between 1960 and 1962, which originally connected the port warehouses with three footbridges—only one of which has been preserved. The Salorges center remains the official address of the headquarters of the Grand Maritime Port of Nantes Saint-Nazaire. The quay, 110 m (360 ft) long, also hosts the Navibus ferry terminal, providing passenger river transport, notably to Trentemoult.
- Marquis-d'Aiguillon Wharf: Measuring 755 m (2,477 ft), it no longer receives ships. Originally, in 1763, the city of Nantes decided to construct a navigable path along the Loire River to avoid the climb of the Sainte-Anne hill, and named it Marquis-d'Aiguillon Wharf. It was temporarily renamed "Palamède Quay" during the French Revolution and was widened in 1909 with a reinforced concrete jetty.
- Saint-Louis Wharf: At 380 m (1,250 ft) in length, it no longer receives boats. Initially called the Sécherie Quay, it was named after a warehouse used to steam flour and dried vegetables. In 1781, Beconnais established a flour mill there, followed in 1818 by a cane sugar refinery. Between 1825 and 1830, the refinery was taken over by the Louis Say & Company. In 1895, the flour mill was replaced by the Grands Moulins de la Loire, which supplied flour to the LU biscuit factory and many nearby bakeries. Around the same time, the quay also became a docking location for auxiliary liners of the Compagnie Générale Transatlantique.
- Cordon Bleu Wharf: It is 180 m (590 ft) long. Nearby are a Navibus terminal, a ship repair facility, and a boat wintering area for pleasure craft.

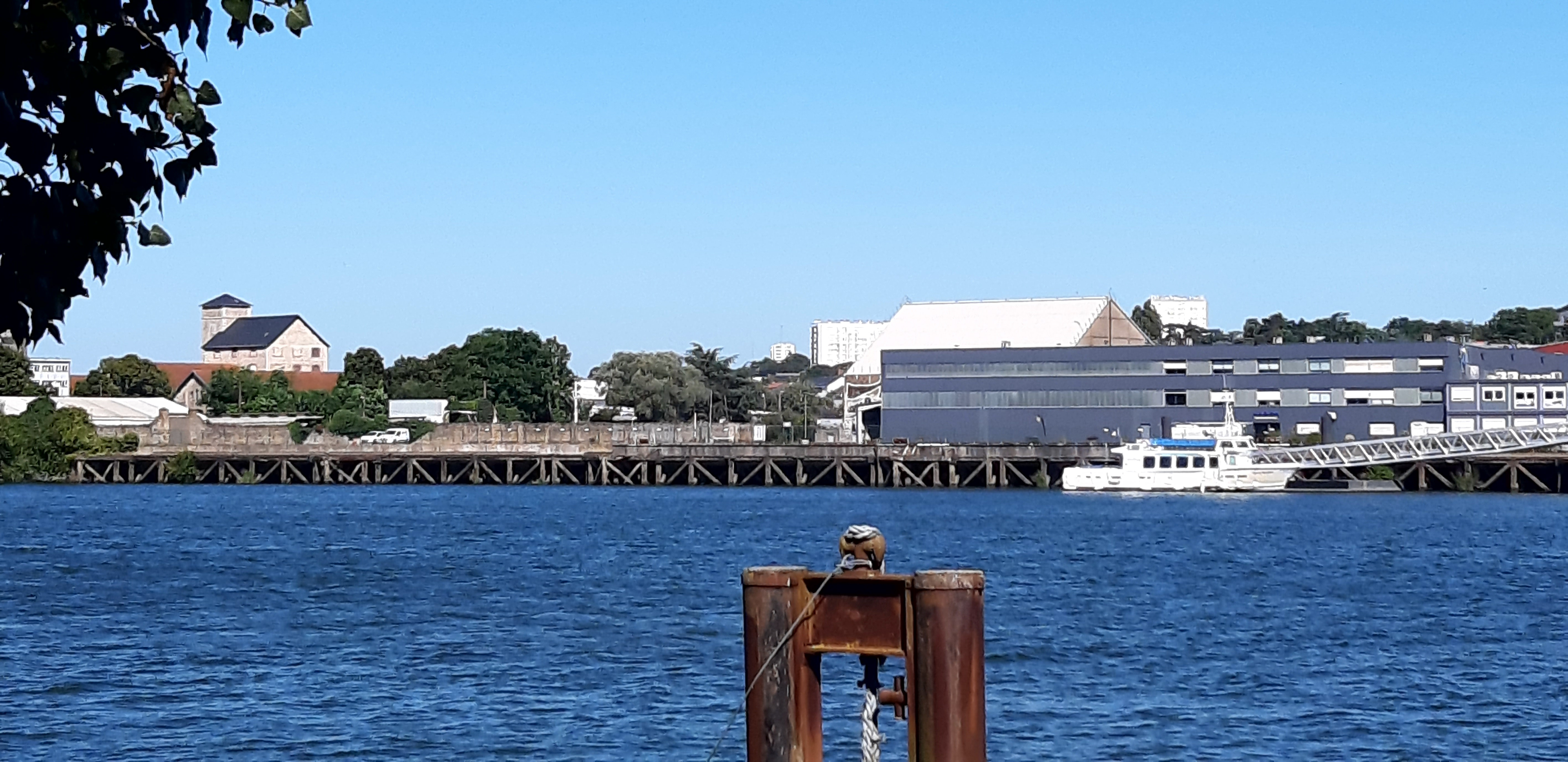
Quai du Cordon-Bleu seen from Trentemoult.

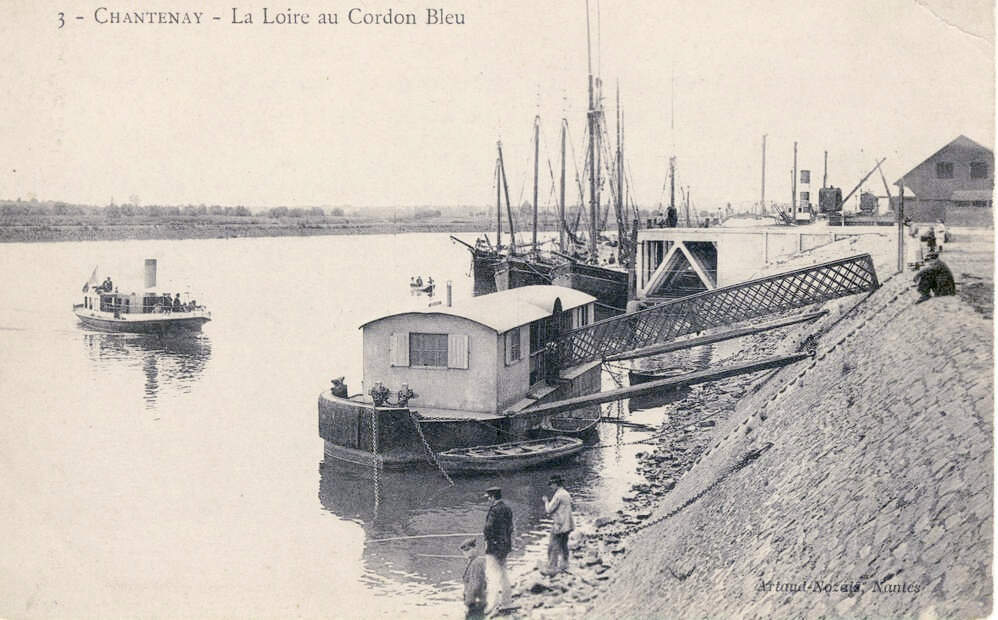
Postcard from the early 20th century showing the Cordon-Bleu in Chantenay-sur-Loire, which was an independent municipality before it was incorporated into Nantes in 1908.

==== Île de Nantes ====
- Antilles Wharf: This 755 m (2,477 ft)-long site no longer hosts ships, but a former port operations building—known as the "banana hangar"—was converted into an entertainment venue.
- Wilson Wharf: on the Île de Nantes, it was built starting in 1913 and expanded in 1928. At 930 m (3,050 ft) long, it specialized in hosting cruise ships between 2002 and 2016.

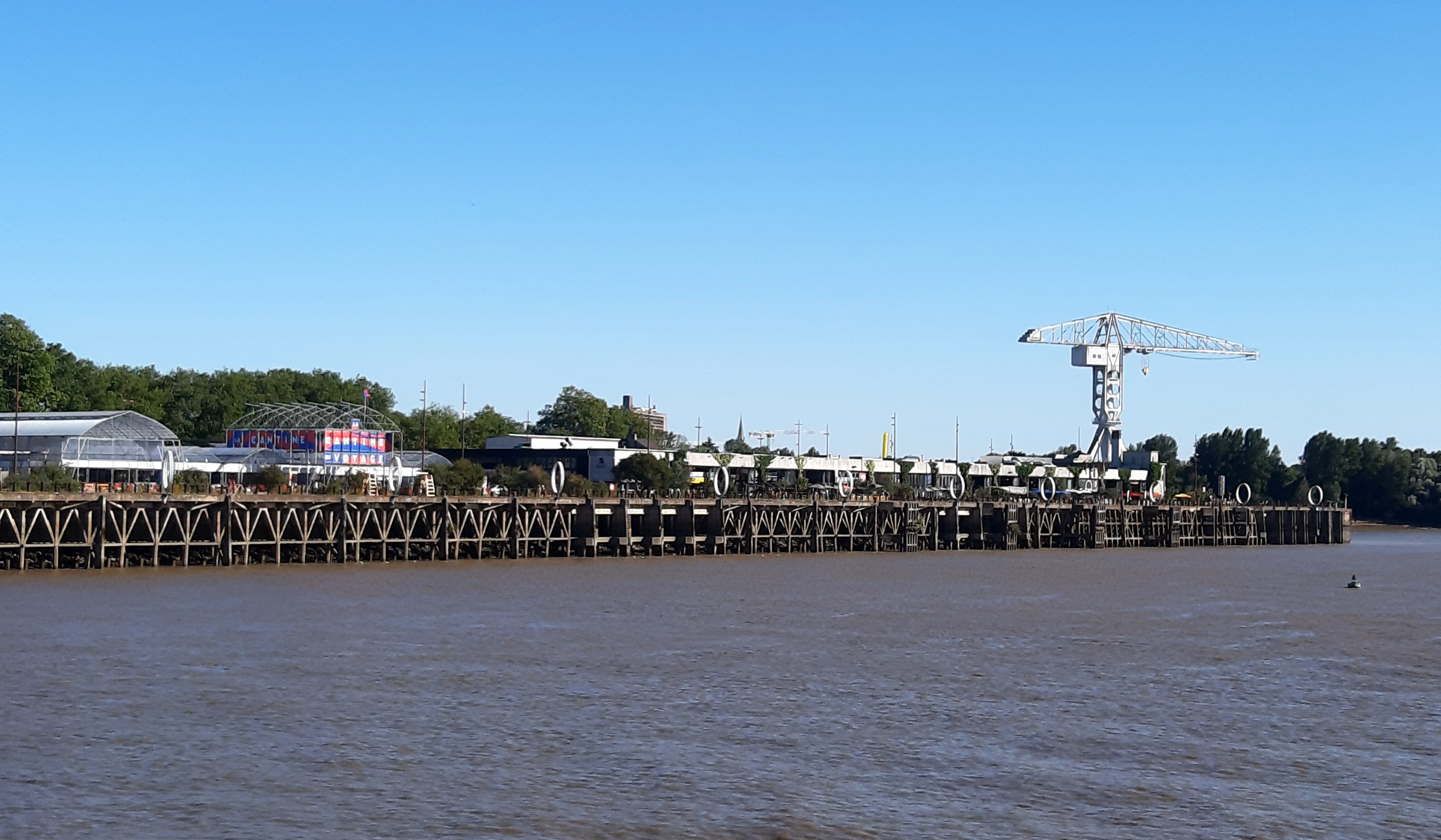
Antilles Wharf, Hangar 21, known as the "Banana Hangar", and the Titan Grise crane, were classified as a historic monument on 27 May 2005, at the downstream tip of the Île de Nantes.

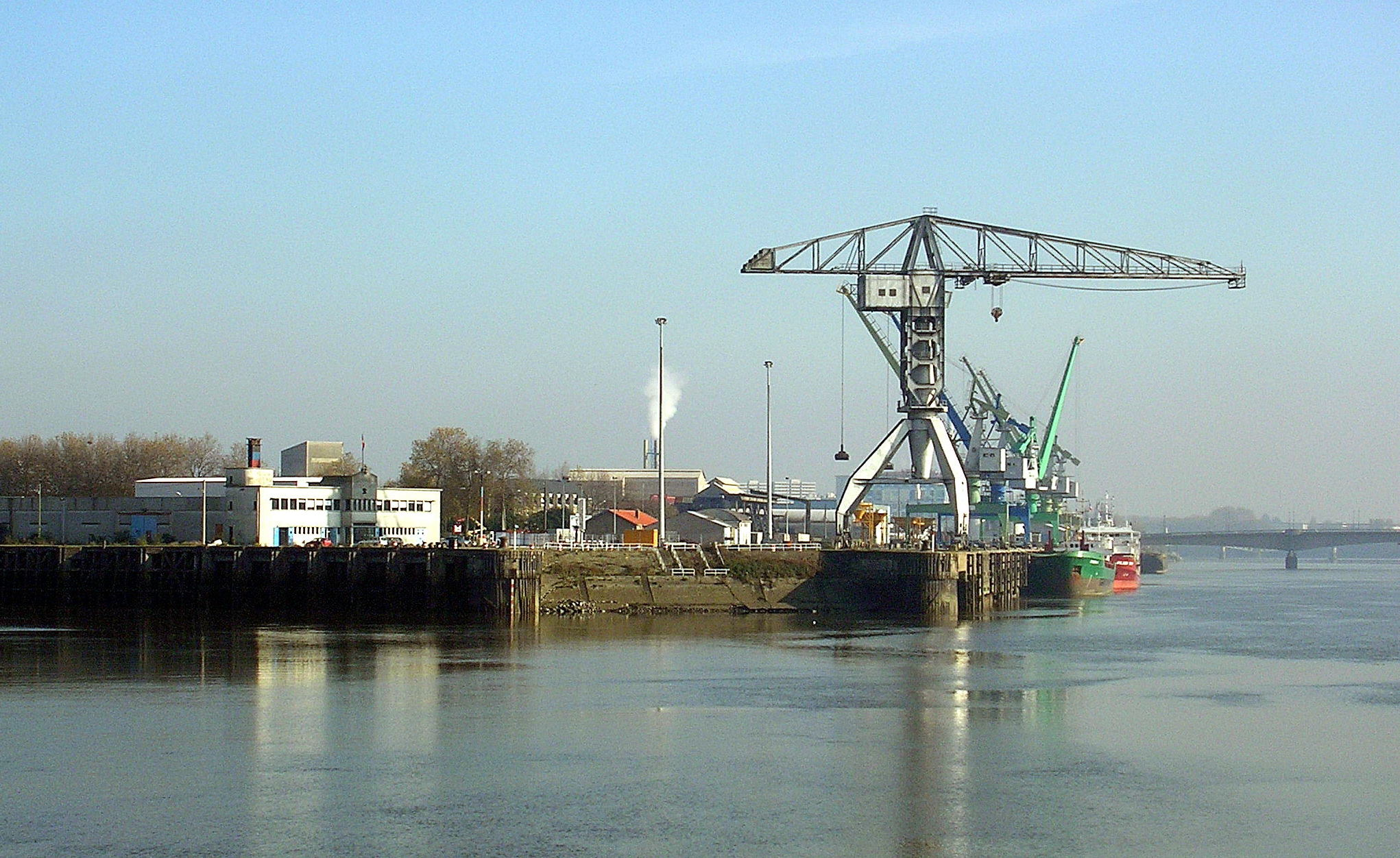
Wilson Wharf and Titan Grey crane, before the port ceased operations.

== History ==
=== Bronze Age ===
The history of the Port of Nantes predates that of the city itself. It began with the advent of bronze metallurgy—an alloy of copper and tin. Tin (cassiterite) extracted from the Nozay deposit or the Abbaretz mine was transported by barge via the Erdre River to its confluence with the Loire, where a primitive port emerged. For over a millennium, the ore thus transported—along with that from a vein formerly beneath today's François-Bruneau Street in the city center—was involved in commercial exchanges via the Loire. By the end of the Bronze Age, around 900 BCE, a local bronze industry appeared, as evidenced by traces of three foundries discovered in the Mauves plain, the Jardin des Plantes, and Croix-Bonneau. The copper needed for production was imported from Spain. Other traded goods included salt, preserved foods, leather, and cereals. The early port likely consisted of beaching areas or wooden docks stretching from the Jardin des Plantes upstream to the Chézine downstream. The port name at that time is unknown—it might have been Corbilo, a Gallic port mentioned in Greek geographic tradition as being on the Loire, though this remains unconfirmed.

=== Antiquity ===
The first Celtic groups arrived in Gaul at the end of the Bronze Age and organized locally into tribes between 500 and 100 BCE. The Namnetes occupied the north bank of the Loire (present-day Nantes), while the Pictones occupied the southern bank (present-day Rezé). During the Gallic Wars, the Pictones supported the Roman occupiers. The final battle occurred in August 56 BCE and ended with a Roman victory. This favored the Pictones and spurred the development of the port of Ratiatum, which had served as a fleet base for the victorious Roman army.

The chief town of the Namnetes (modern-day Nantes) was given the Latin name Portus Namnetum (Port of the Namnetes) and also known as Condevincum in Latinized Gaulish. It was a simple trading post (emporium) facilitating the transit of tin, marble, pottery, salt, cereals, Italian wine, and oils from the Iberian Peninsula. There were also shipyards on the Chézine and a fishing port. Goods transported via the river were partly unloaded, with the rest transshipped onto barges for further navigation to other ports along the Loire, such as Ancenis. The limits of the Gallo-Roman port extended from Rue de Richebourg (north of the current Nantes train station) upstream to Port-Maillard (between the current Château des Ducs de Bretagne and the Loire) downstream. The arrival of Roman civilization fostered the growth of a city around the port, and in 276 CE, the Gallo-Roman wall of Nantes was built to protect the city and its port from barbarian invasions. This was followed by a series of invasions and civil wars from the 4th to the 10th century, plunging the city into a dark period and causing the port's decline.

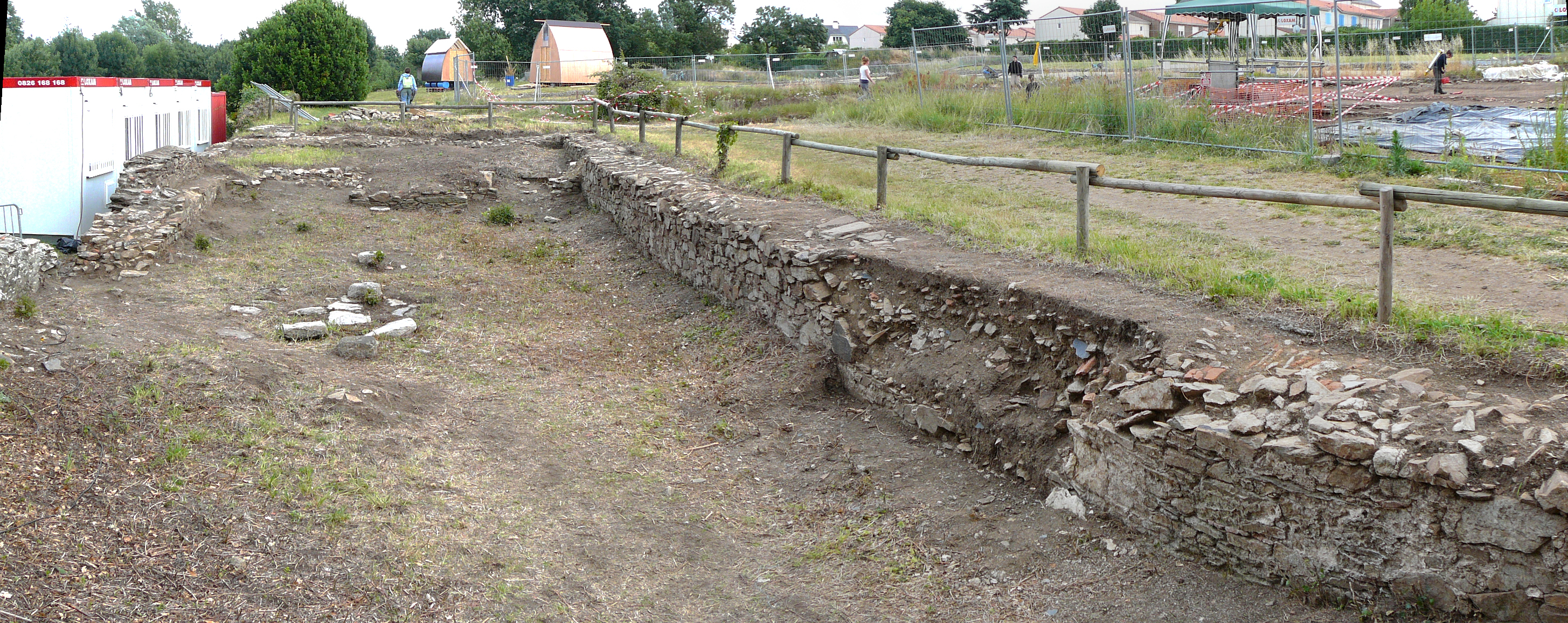
Remains of the Gallo-Roman wall of Ratiatum.

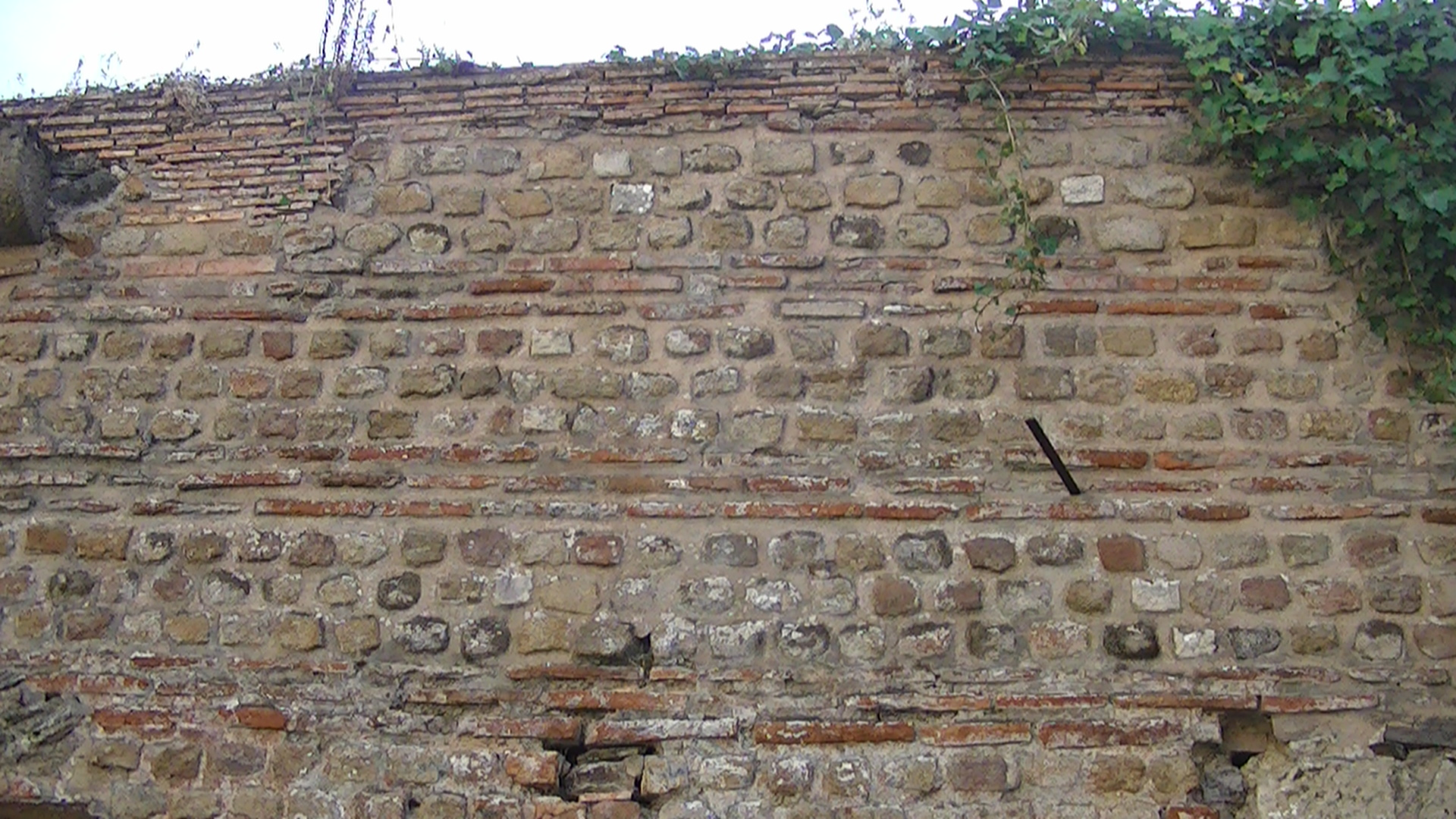
Remains of the Gallo-Roman wall of Nantes, in the former Convent of the Cordeliers of Nantes.

=== Middle Ages ===
The port was revived thanks to the trade of wine and salt. The production of salt increased due to the abandonment of the old method of ignigenous salt (obtained by evaporating brine through the action of heat) in favor of the Roman technique of salt marshes, which had the effect of concentrating production in the Guérande peninsula and the Bay of Bourgneuf. In Nantes, in the 13th century, Pierre I of Brittany redeveloped two ports on either side of the castle on ancient sites: the port of Pierre-de-France upstream and the port-Maillard downstream, named after the seneschal Briand-Maillard. Further downstream, developments at the Bouffay Wharf and the Port-au-Vin (now Place du Commerce) became essential links in Nantes' port infrastructure of the time. The port was then mainly devoted to transit, focused on French and European coastal trade. Wine from the Loire Valley was brought down to Nantes to be transshipped and sent to Breton ports and the British Isles. In the opposite direction, salt from Guérande traveled up the Loire to be transported via Nantes to the port of Orléans, destined to supply Paris. In the 14th century, trade expanded to include Spain (iron, alum, textiles) and ports of the Hanseatic League. The port slowly migrated westward: Richebourg declined in favor of Port-Maillard, and the development of the Fosse began with the construction of warehouses next to the Salorges. Beyond the city limits, outports at Port Lavigne, Couëron, and Le Pellerin allowed goods to be unloaded onto smaller vessels that in turn ascended the estuary. During the same century, Nantes became a military port to protect itself against acts of piracy, which were increasing in parallel with the growth of commercial trade.

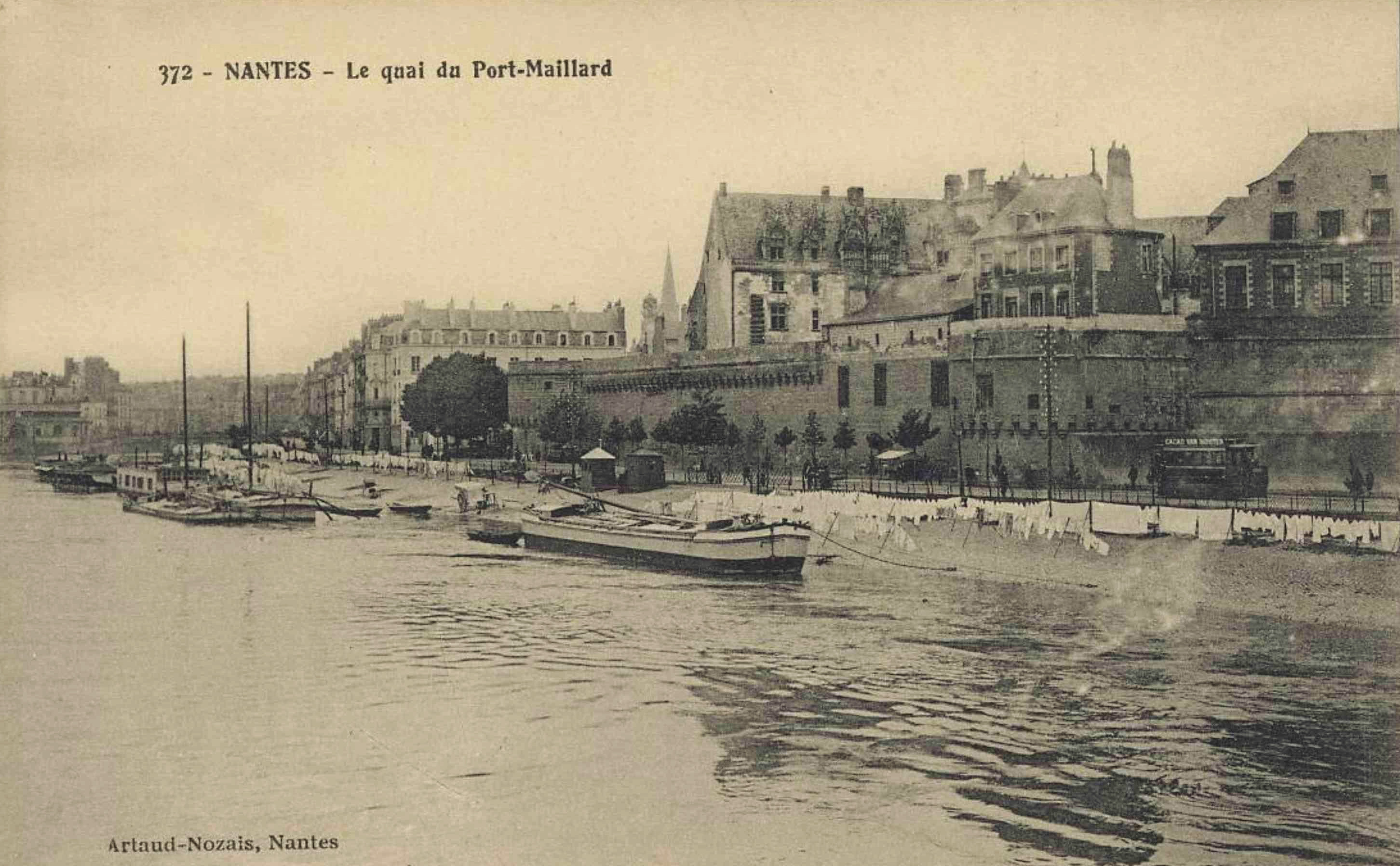
Port-Maillard Wharf (early 20th century).

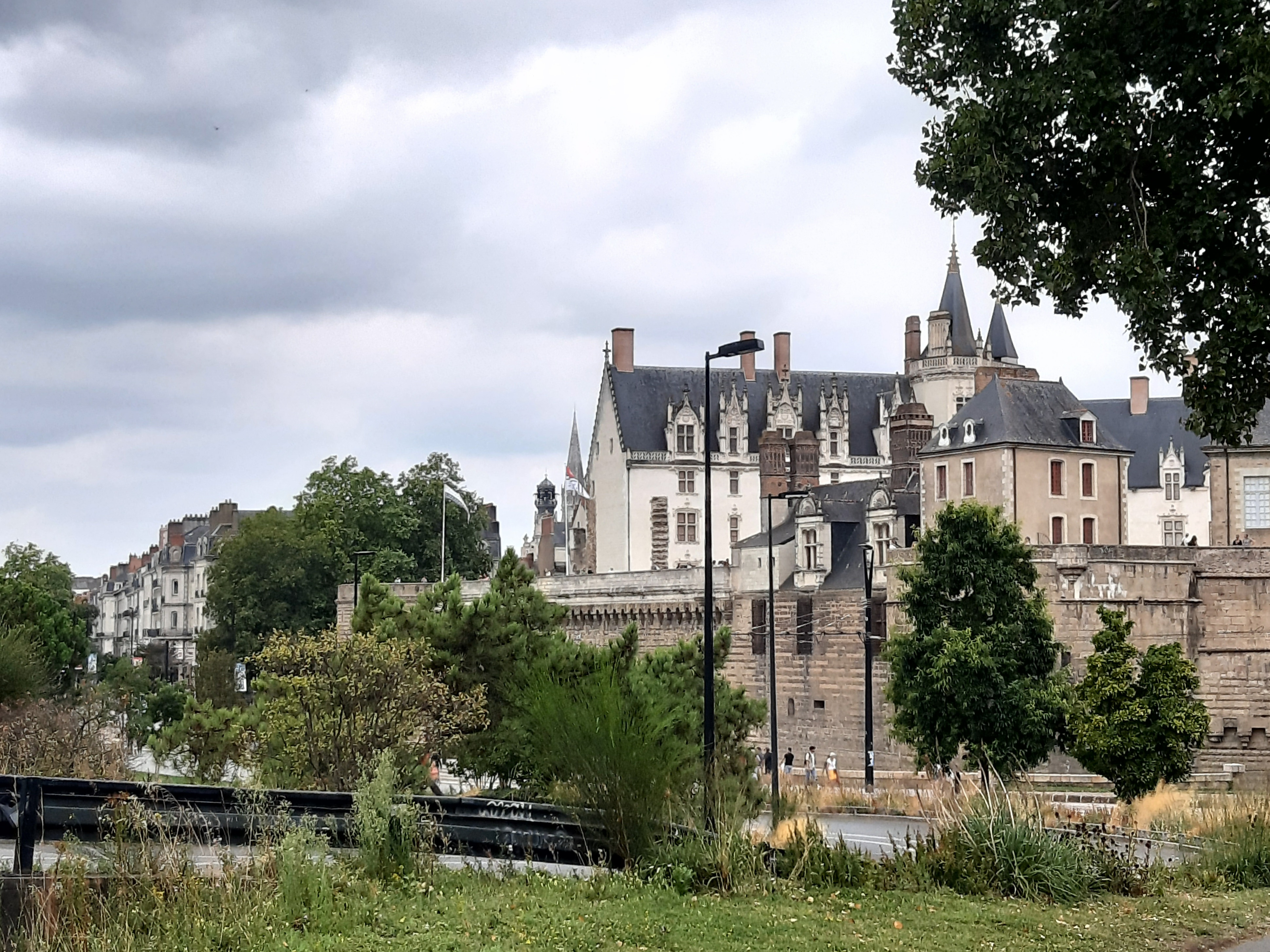
Same view a century later: since the river was filled in, the Loire no longer flows at the foot of the castle, which has undergone restoration work.

=== 16th century ===
While the Portuguese embarked on colonial ventures across the oceans, soon followed by the Dutch, the Spanish, and the English, the merchants of the port of Nantes cautiously continued their wine and salt trade throughout the 16th century. The Union of the Duchy of Brittany with the Crown of France, completed in 1532, had no significant impact on trade. The port of Nantes remained vulnerable to acts of piracy and consequently became one of the two bases for the kingdom's galleys in the Atlantic—the other being Marseille for the Mediterranean. These defensive ships were built at the Port-au-Vin shipyard before it was relocated to Île Gloriette. In 1554, the port of Nantes hosted twenty-two of the kingdom's sixty-eight royal galleys.

The French Wars of Religion (1562–1598) interrupted the country's economic growth for thirty years. The Duke of Mercœur, appointed governor of Brittany on 5 September 1582, turned Nantes into a stronghold of the Catholic League. The powerful Spanish Empire of Philip II, an ally of the League, took control of the port of Nantes, and for years, trade was conducted solely with Spain. That same year, Port-Maillard was equipped with its first wharf, strengthening its activity. The abjuration of Henry IV eventually forced Mercœur to submit, allowing the king to re-enter the city and sign the Edict of Nantes there on 13 April 1598.

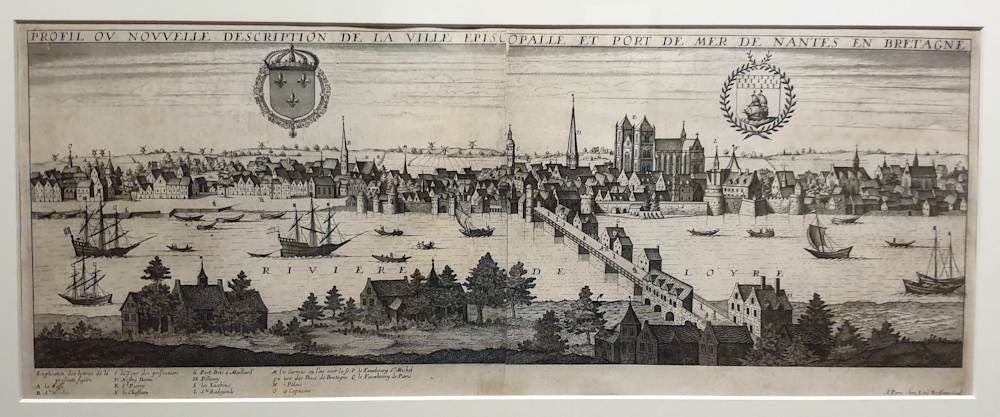
The port of Nantes as designed by Jean Boisseau in 1645, still centered on the medieval sites of Port-Maillard and Bouffay. Upstream from the Pirmil Bridge, traditional river transport continues on the Loire, while downstream, the merchant fleet begins to develop, initially from Port-au-Vin.

=== 17th century ===
The 17th century marked a turning point in the history of the port of Nantes. Traditional trades, especially in wine and salt, went through a crisis between the 1630s and 1670s, and the sites of Port-Maillard, Quai du Bouffay, and Port-au-Vin lost their leading position in the port infrastructure. On the other hand, during these years, the port of Nantes was integrated into the trade networks of the first French colonial empire. Benefiting from its geographic position on the Atlantic coast, the port expanded from a regional scope to an international dimension within just twenty years, from 1660 to 1680. This major transformation, encouraged by Colbertism, benefited the Quai de la Fosse, downstream from the city center. Used since the Middle Ages, it was developed from 1516 onward and enlarged in 1632. A sharp increase in traffic occurred in 1670, mainly driven by trade with the French West Indies. Goods essential to colonial life—wine, brandy, flour, cloth, copper, tin, oil, candles, building stones, crockery, and rifles—were shipped to the islands, initially through direct routes. In return, large quantities of cane sugar were imported to be refined. By 1671, the city had at least five sugar refineries, and by 1700, up to twelve. Other tropical products were also imported, such as tobacco, cocoa, and cotton. Following the Spanish merchants who had settled in Nantes in the 16th century and from whom they learned maritime trade techniques, the Dutch, Portuguese, and later the Irish of Nantes were succeeded in the 17th century by local shipowning families, who rose to become part of the city's economic elite. Around the mid-17th century, Paimboeuf became the main outport of Nantes, while in Nantes itself, the Quai de la Fosse—better suited to the new demands of navigation and port handling—established itself as the city's modern port, displacing the medieval port sites, which gradually lost their functions and were eventually buried, like other wharves in the city center, during the land reclamation works carried out between 1926 and 1946. The development of sugar plantations in the West Indies required labor, justifying the population policy supported by Colbert. Nantes merchants recruited young emigrants, generally aged 14 to 25, from the artisan class burdened by the guild system, landless peasants, and some younger sons from ruined families, all from western France. Required to work for three years for a planter to repay the cost of the crossing, they were then offered a small plot of land to develop and a modest amount of money.

However, this primitive system had two major drawbacks: it inadequately met the colonies' high labor needs, and there was an imbalance between outbound cargo (ships left Nantes with half-empty holds) and return cargo. To address this, the system gradually evolved into a slave trade integrated into a triangular trade system.

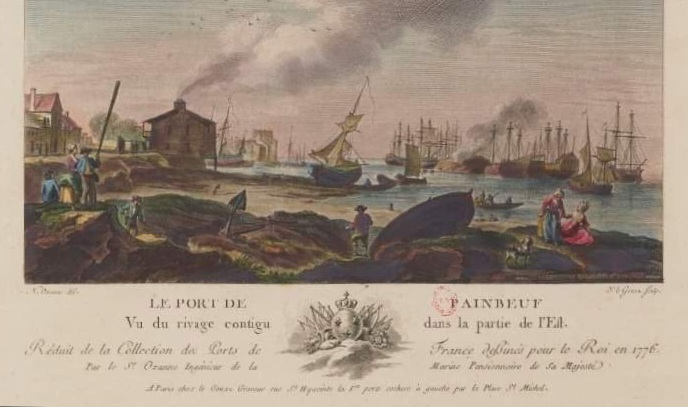
Port of Paimbœuf painted by Nicolas Ozanne in 1776.

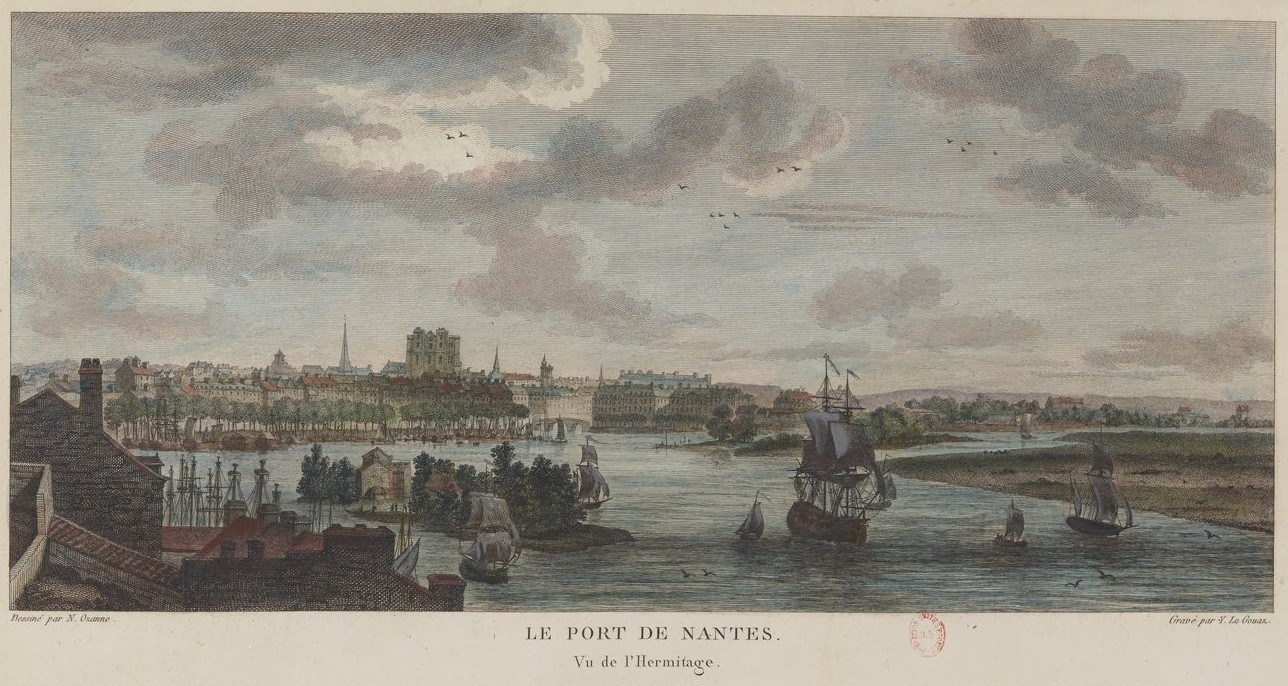
The port of Nantes seen from Sainte-Anne hill looking upstream, 1776. The center of gravity shifted towards the Fosse Wharf.

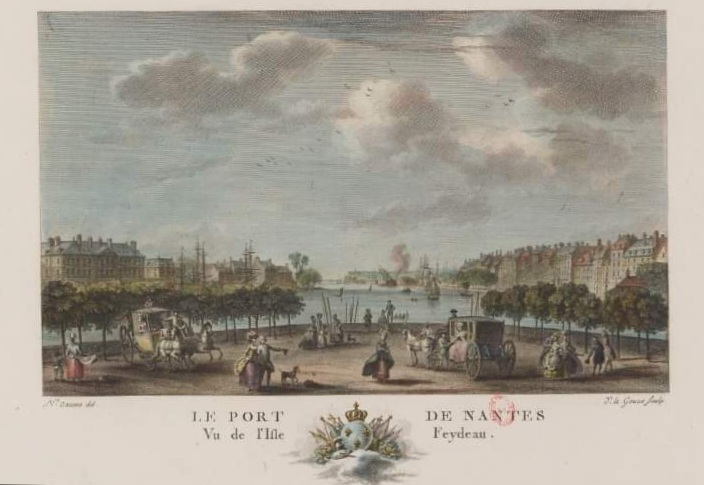
The port of Nantes seen from Île Feydeau looking downstream, 1776. Print by Nicolas Ozanne.

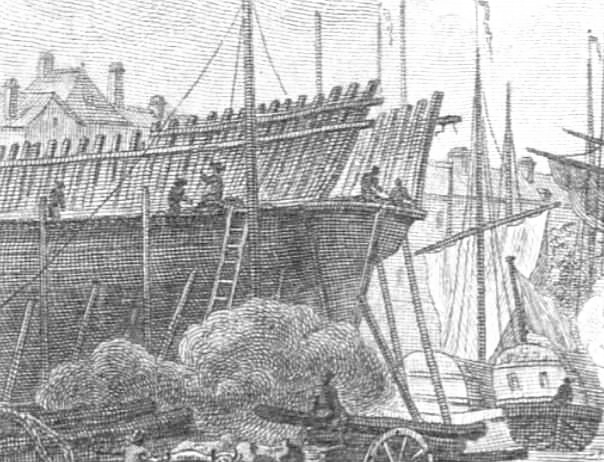
Shipyard at the Fosse Wharf in 1776.

=== 18th century ===
==== Triangular trade ====
The slave trade in Nantes began at the end of the 17th century. The first confirmed expedition from the port dates to 1688, several years after the start of the slave trade in La Rochelle (1643) and Bordeaux (1672). French merchants were following the example of the Portuguese, pioneers in the field, followed by the Spanish, Dutch, and English. In Nantes, ten expeditions took place by 1698, requiring the payment of a fee to the French East India Company, whose headquarters were at the citadel of Port-Louis. Following the principles of Colbertism, which aimed to minimize foreign expenditures, Nantes merchants loaded inexpensive trade goods ("pacotille")—glassware, printed cottons, weapons—which they exchanged in West Africa with local rulers for captives. In the West Indies, these captives were sold as slaves, and the merchants returned with ships full of tropical goods.

The triangular trade expansion in Nantes took off in 1713, following the War of Spanish Succession, leading to a significant increase in port activity. Shipbuilding in the Loire estuary became a priority, and the local industry adapted to the booming sugar cane trade. Nantes rose to become the leading French port until the mid-18th century. However, this growth was not continuous and was interrupted by periods of recession, mainly due to major conflicts such as the War of Austrian Succession and the Seven Years' War, which caused an economic collapse.

The medieval walls of Nantes were demolished to facilitate urban expansion toward the port. Wealthy shipowners involved in the slave trade constructed private mansions in the La Fosse, Île Feydeau, and Île Gloriette districts, allowing them to monitor their fleets and business operations. Additionally, they built country estates along the banks of the Erdre River.

==== French Revolution ====
During the French Revolution, particularly during the Reign of Terror, prisoners from the War in the Vendée were held in the Coffee Warehouse Prison near the port district. The fear of an epidemic led to the infamous "Drownings of Nantes" between November 1793 and February 1794. The Quai de la Sécherie (later Quai Saint-Louis) in Chantenay was the site of two mass executions by drowning in 1793:

- On the night of 16–17 November, a boat carrying around 90 refractory priests was deliberately sunk in the Loire.
- On the night of 23 December, approximately 800 people, including women and children, perished in the same manner.

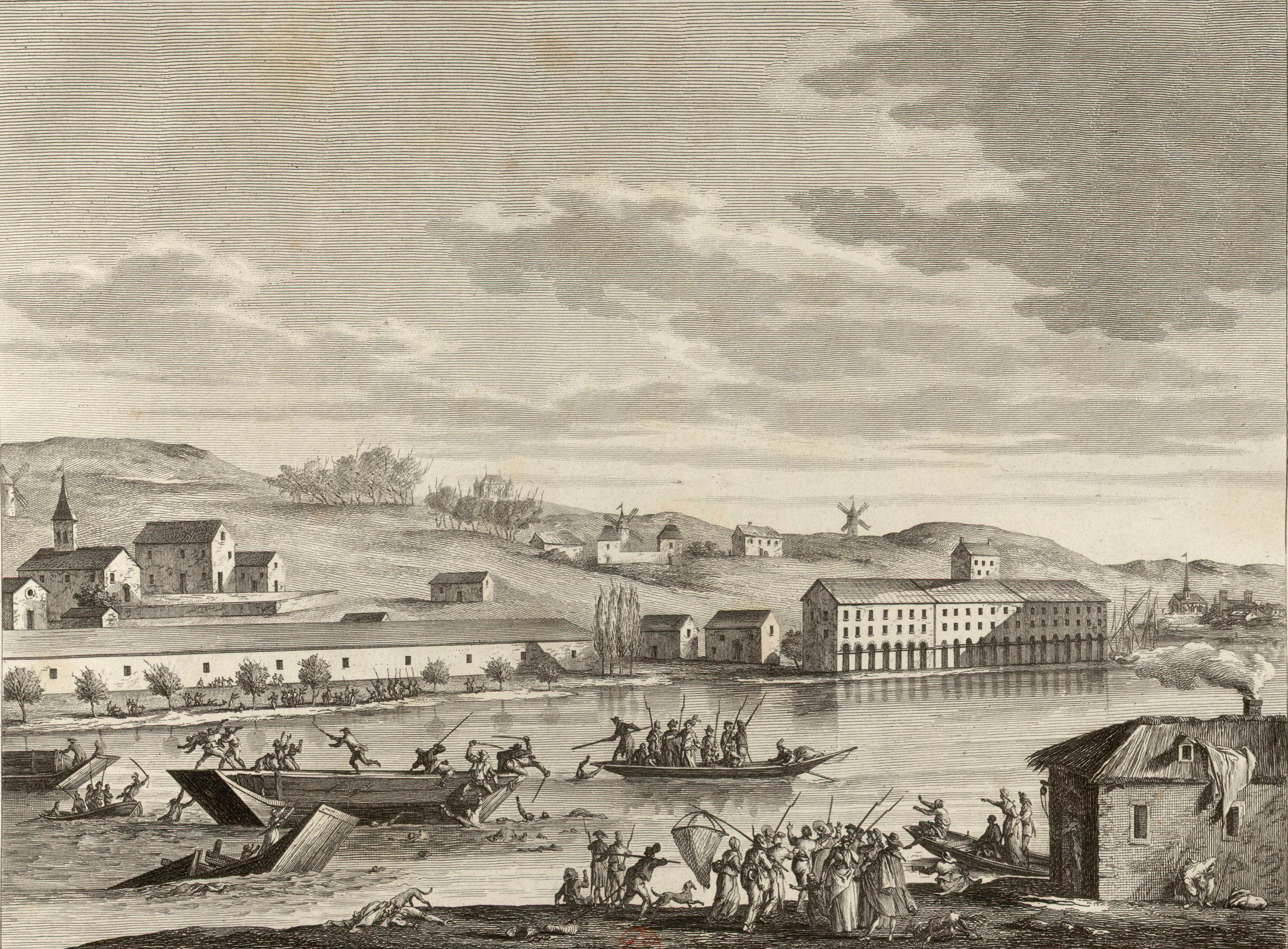
Engraving from the late 18th century entitled Drownings in the Loire by order of the ferocious Carrier.

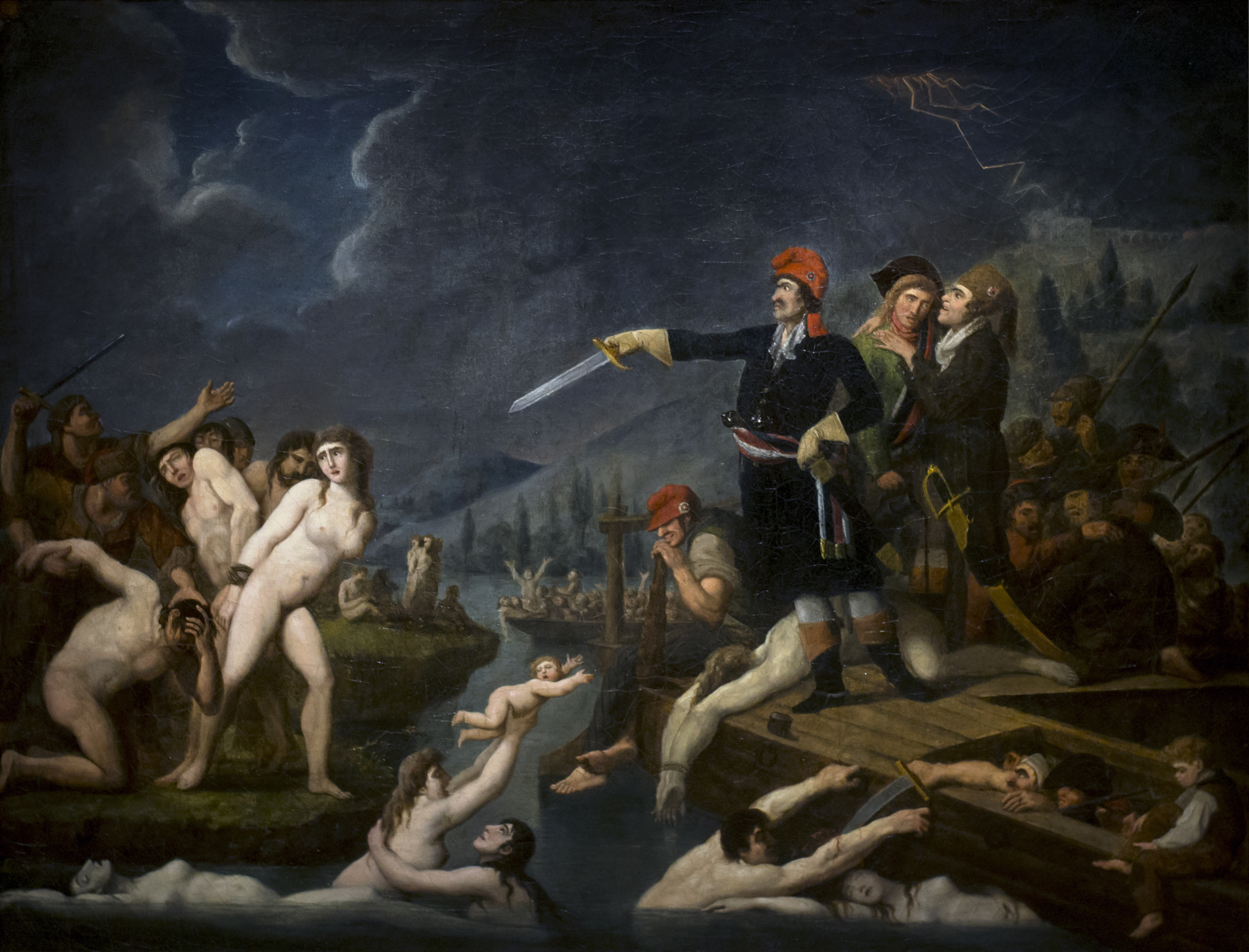
Les Noyades de Nantes, anonymous painter, Nantes History Museum.

=== 19th century ===
The last known slave ship to depart from Nantes did so in 1833. The abolition of slavery in France in 1848 and the development of the Second French Colonial Empire transformed the port, which adapted to the Industrial Revolution's shift in trade models. Port activity adjusted to supply the emerging industries with raw materials and to distribute their products to foreign markets. As a result, industrial production gradually surpassed trade, and the pace of industrial output and shipbuilding (notably at Chantiers Dubigeon and Ateliers et Chantiers de la Loire) remained strong throughout the 19th and early 20th centuries. Several industrial establishments were founded, including the forges of Basse-Indre and Brissonneau & Lotz. In the agri-food sector, sugar refineries were joined by canneries, pioneered by Pierre-Joseph Colin (1785–1848), who established the first sardine canning factory in 1824 at 9 Rue des Salorges, sourcing fish from the port of La Turballe. Similar businesses multiplied throughout the city, including Cassegrain (founded in 1856) and Saupiquet (founded in 1891 at 13 Rue Crucy). Louis Lefèvre-Utile took over the LU biscuit company from his parents in 1882, industrializing production by founding a factory on Île de la Madeleine along the Loire. Biscuiterie Nantaise (BN) was established in 1896 near Place François-II on Île de la Prairie-au-Duc by a group of local traders.

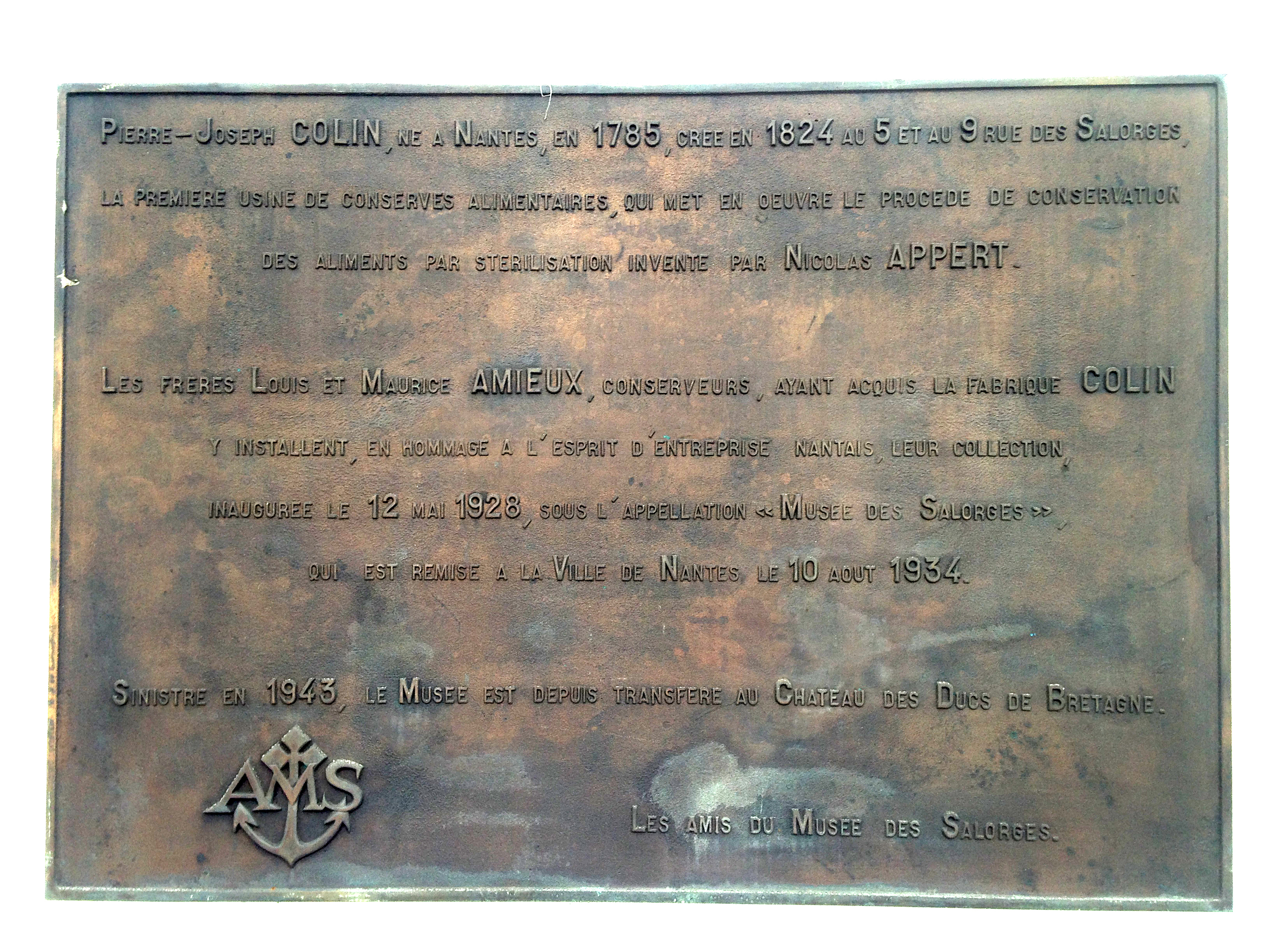
Commemorative plaque on the façade of the Centre des Salorges in memory of the beginnings of the food preservation industry.

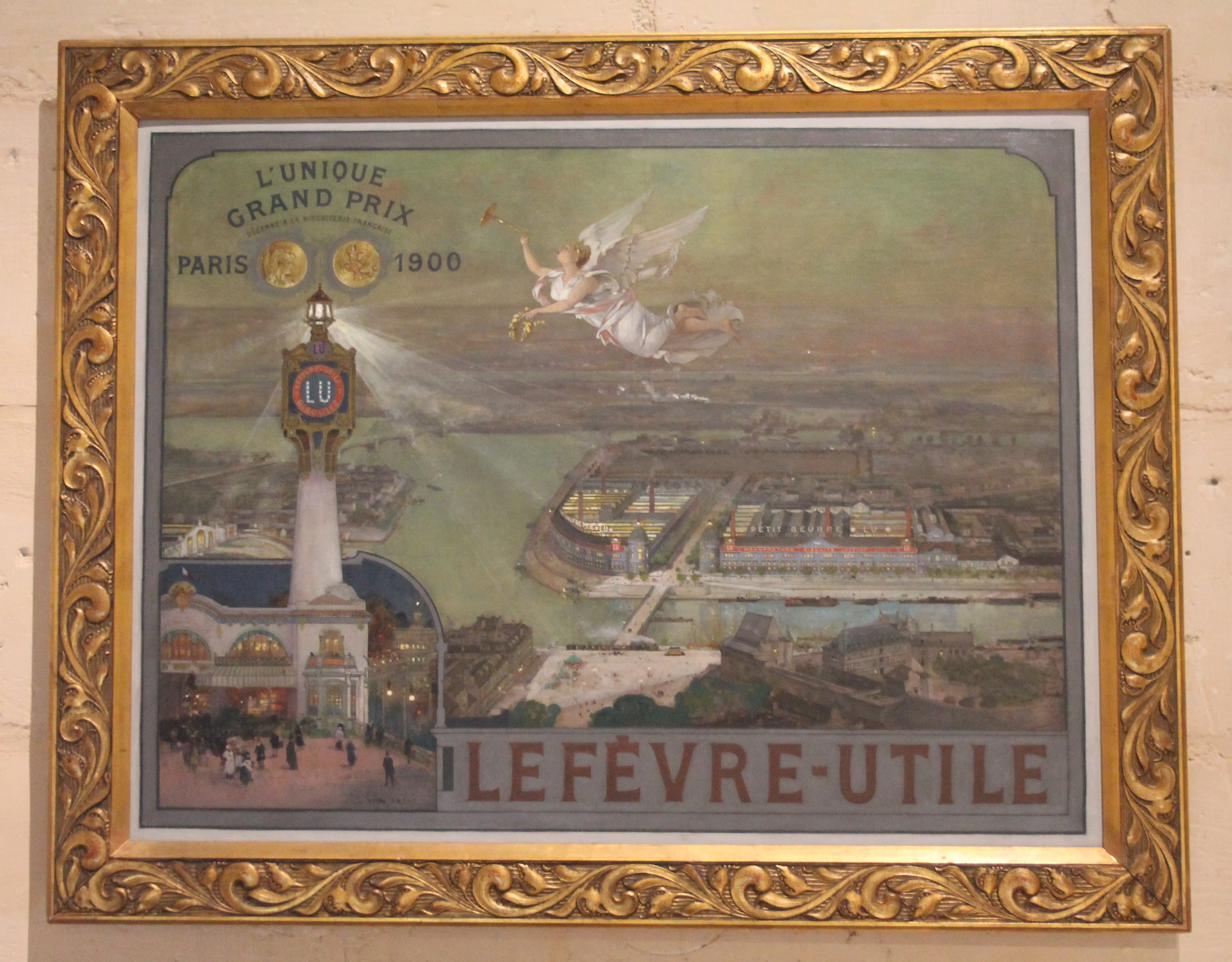
The LU factory on the banks of the Loire in Nantes (The LU factory, Renommée and the LU pavilion at the 1900 Paris World's Fair, painting by Luigi Loir.

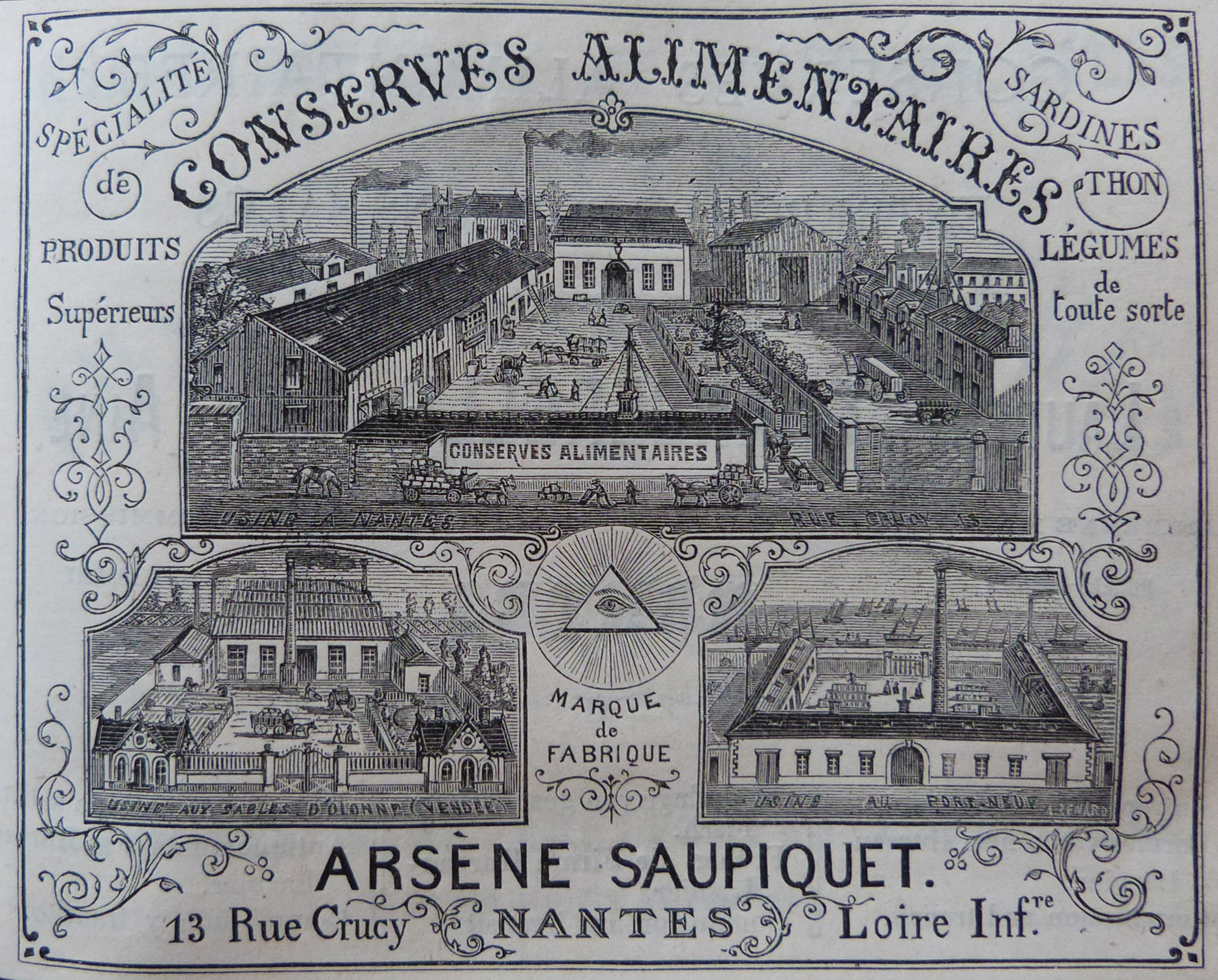
Advertising poster for the Saupiquet factories.

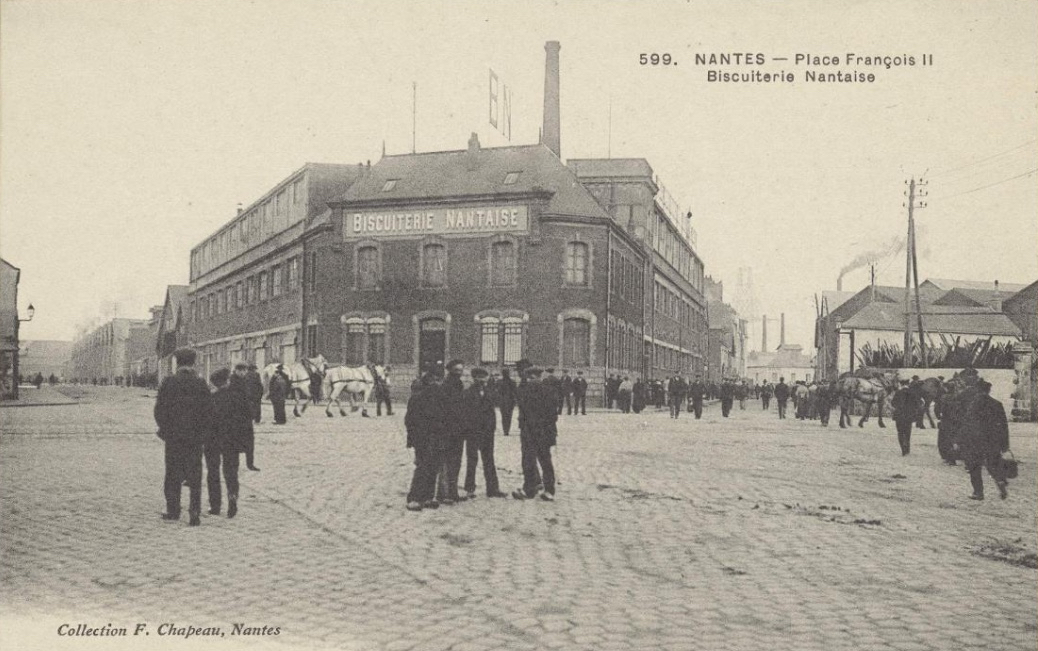
The Biscuiterie Nantaise factories on Place François-II.

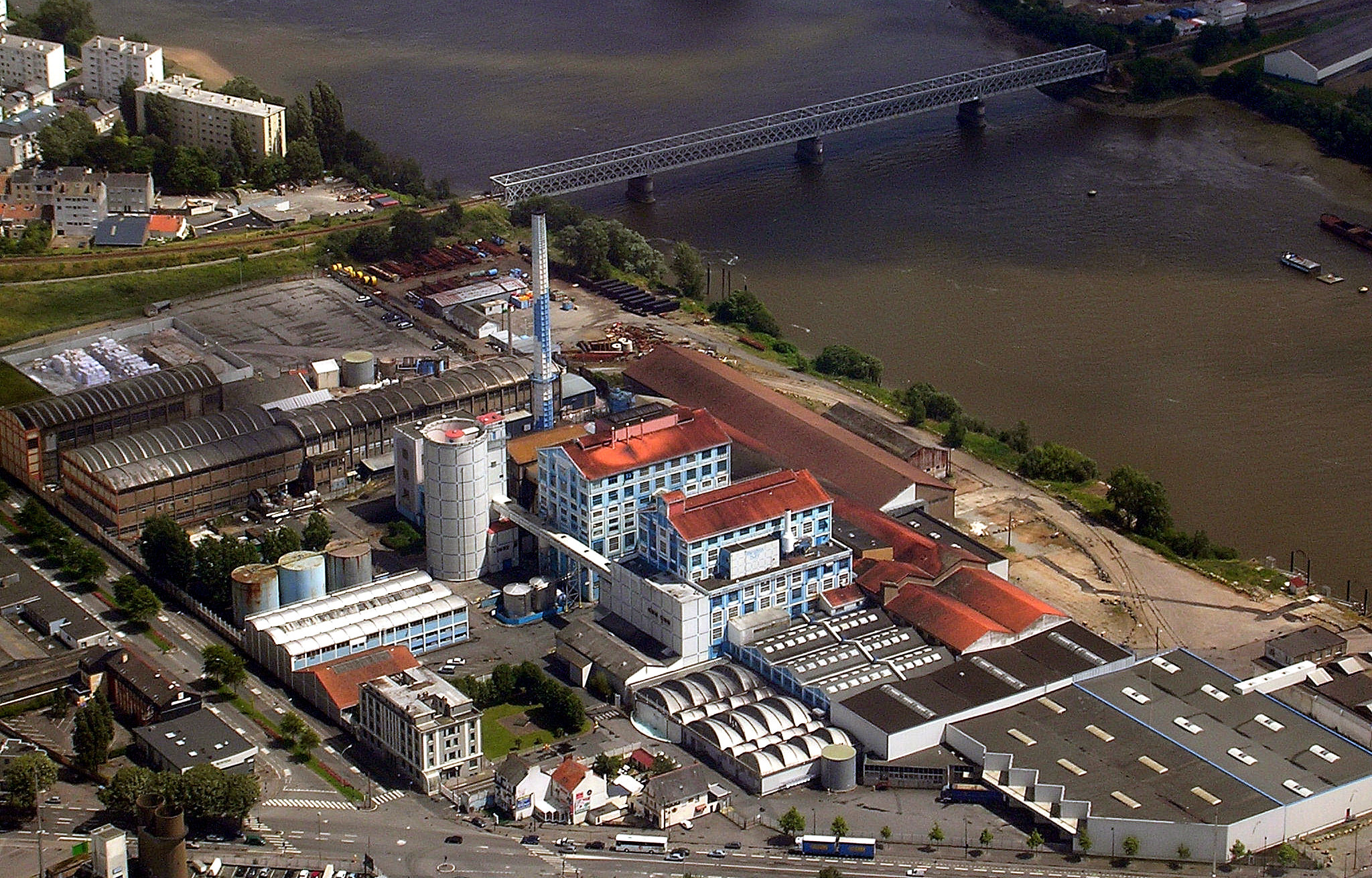
Former Béghin Say sugar refinery on the banks of the Loire (Pirmil arm).

To support increasing activity, the Antilles Wharf was developed starting in 1840, directly across from Quai de la Fosse. However, the Loire River posed navigational challenges—it was shallow, while ships were becoming larger and required greater draft clearance. As a response, the port of Saint-Nazaire was created in 1856 as a new outport for Nantes, replacing Paimbœuf. By the mid-19th century, the port of Nantes had a continuous line of quays along its right bank from the Palais de la Bourse to the boundary with Chantenay-sur-Loire. Beyond that, private quays were developed by companies like Kuhlmann, Saint-Gobain, Talvande, and Chantiers Dubigeon, restricting public access to the river except in specific locations such as Cale Crucy and the village of Roche-Maurice.

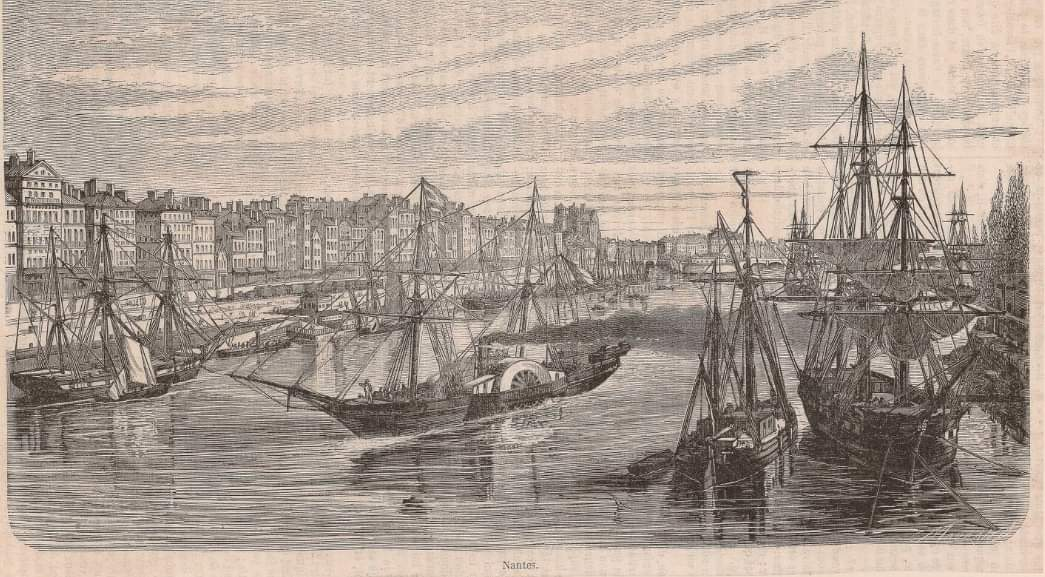
Sailboats and steamboats at the Quai de la Fosse, engraving made in 1850 by Horace Castelli.

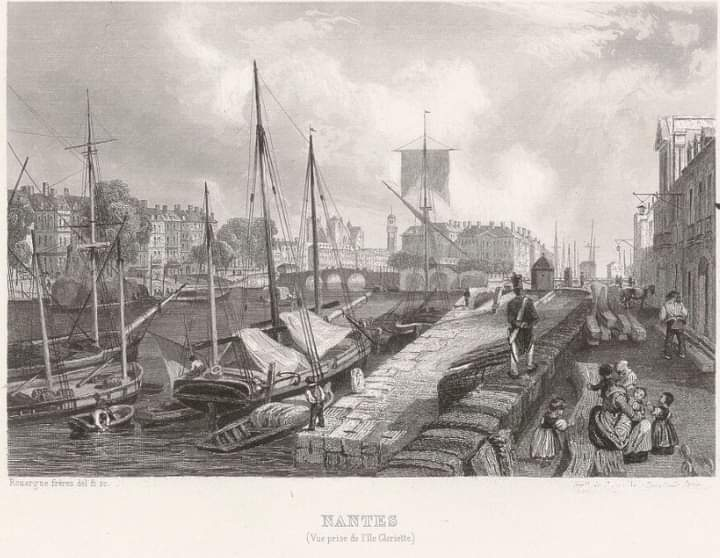
Port activity on Île Gloriette in 1850.

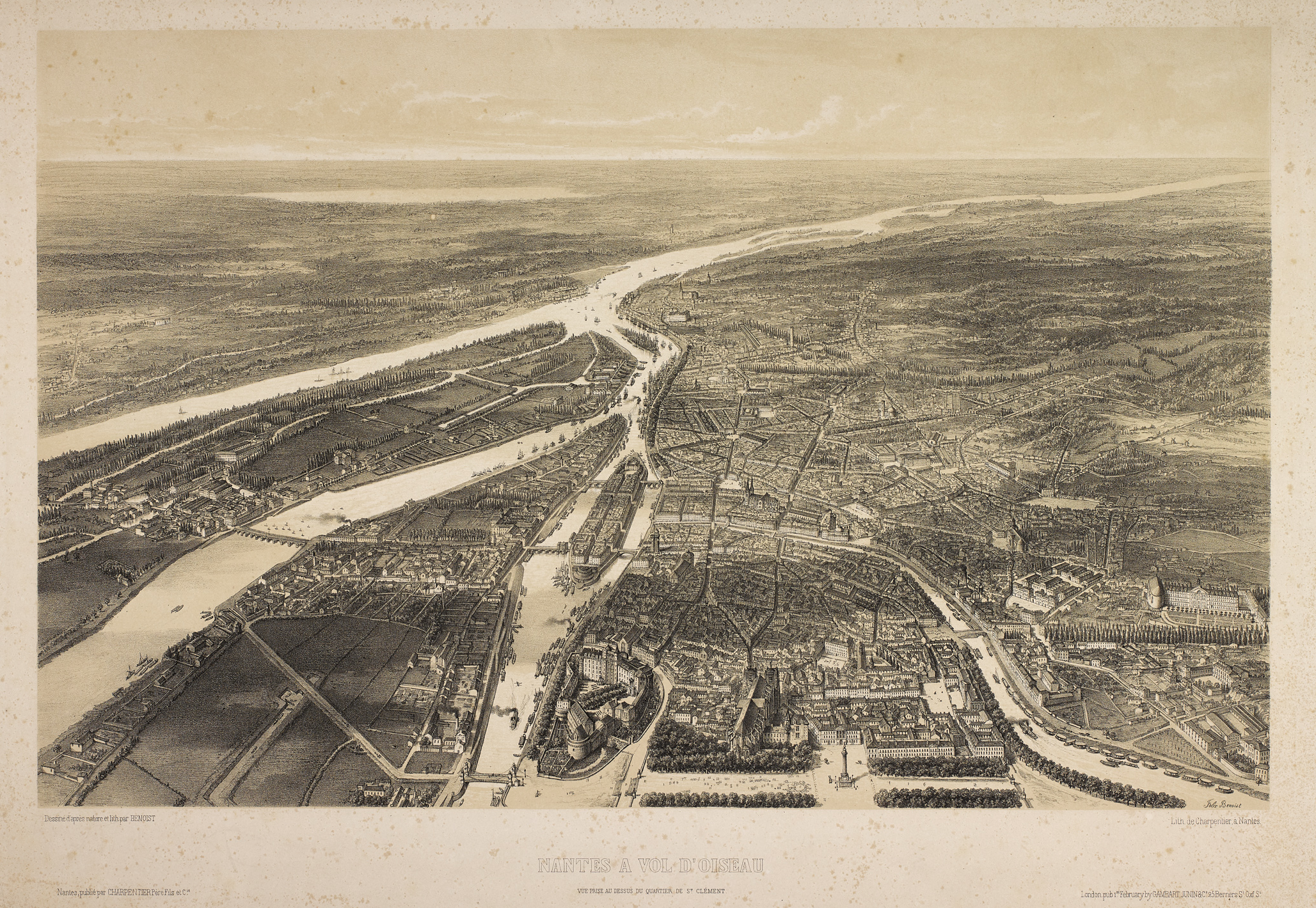
Aerial view of Nantes, its river from upstream to downstream, and its port activity in the 19th century.

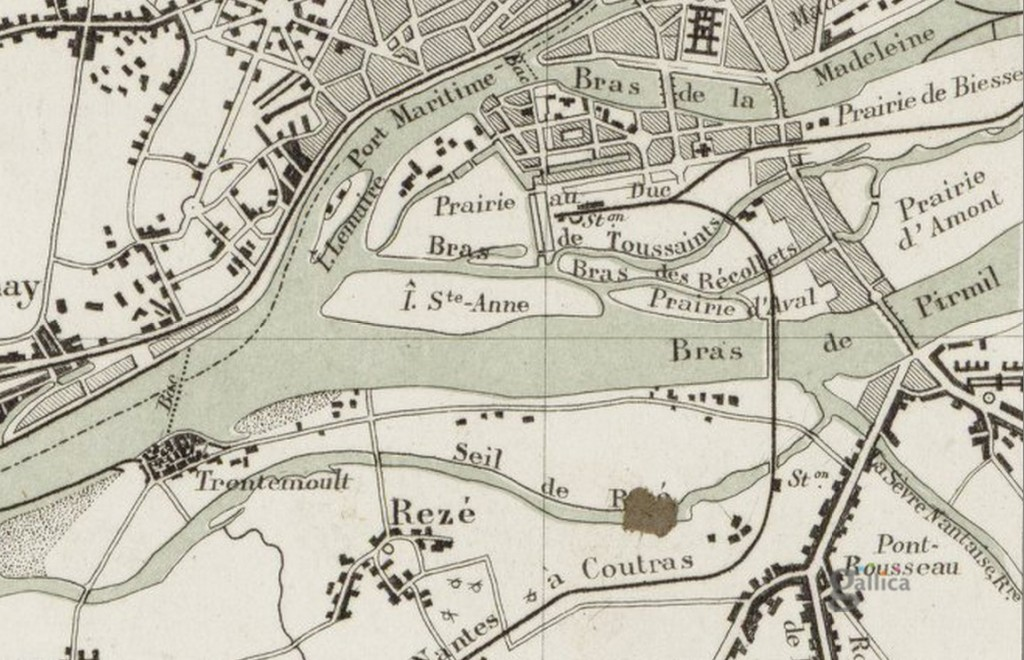
Location of the seaport at Fosse Wharf on a map from 1883.

Starting in 1887, passenger transport services were provided by steamships called Roquio, operating within the port and stopping at various points along Fosse Wharf, Antilles Wharf, and Trentemoult. This service was discontinued in 1970.

By the late 19th century, sandbanks between the communes of Le Pellerin and Frossay made it impossible for large ships to navigate to Nantes. In response, construction of a canal parallel to the river was ordered in 1882, and in 1892, the Canal de la Martinière was inaugurated. Used for commercial navigation for twenty years, it became obsolete as technological advancements allowed for more efficient dredging of the Loire River's bed. Additionally, Île Mabon was leveled starting in 1902 to facilitate entry into the port of Nantes.

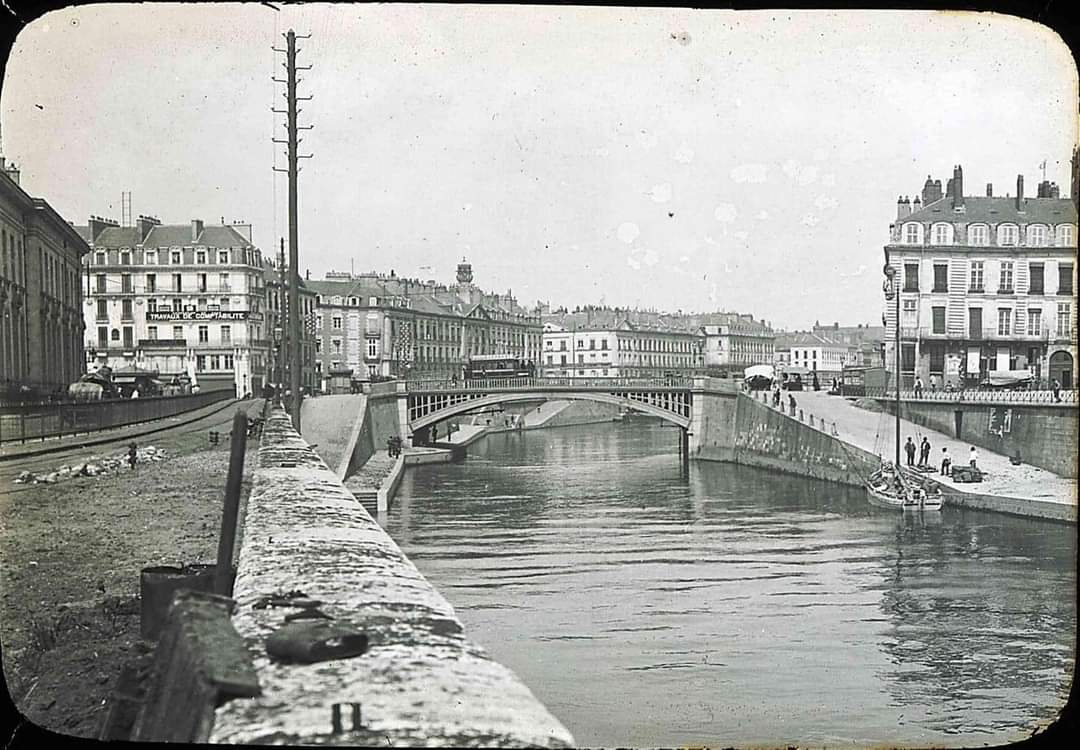
Loading around 1900 of a boat moored at the foot of the Place de la Petite-Hollande near the Hôtel de La Villestreux. The Palais de la Bourse is on the opposite bank. The Place du Commerce and Île Feydeau are connected by the Pont de la Bourse.

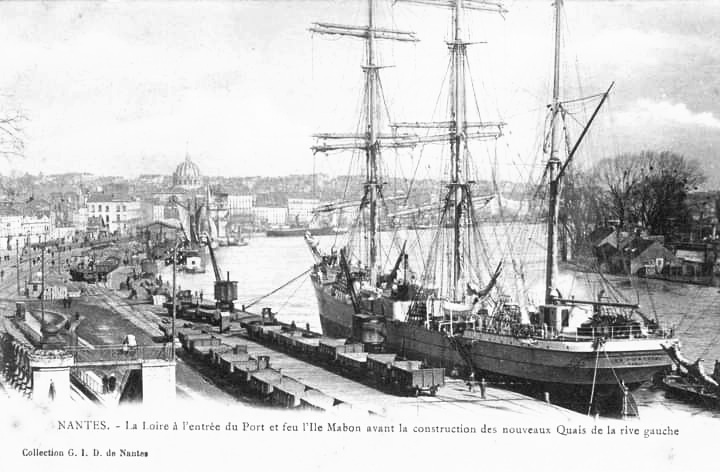
The former Île Mabon before it was leveled in 1902, facing the Quai Marquis-d'Aiguillon.

=== 20th century ===
With navigation issues resolved, port traffic in Nantes surpassed one million tons per year at the beginning of the 20th century. The Roche-Maurice quay was commissioned around 1912, dedicated to grain exports, further confirming the right bank's role in cereal trading following the earlier development of the Saint-Louis quay for milling operations. That same year, the Crédit Nantais bank was established by local industrialists. The Président-Wilson quay was developed in 1913, and the Cormerais quay was built in 1917 downstream from Roche-Maurice. A petroleum terminal with three docking stations was constructed in the Saint-Herblain area at a site known as "L'Usine Brûlée." (Note: The name comes from the chemical products factory Audrain & Cie, commonly known as the Massereau plant, named after the island on which it was built. In 1861, just over two years after its opening, fire destroyed it and never rebuilt.) It was later integrated into Quai Émile Cormerais in 1921, named in honor of the Nantes Chamber of Commerce and Industry president from 1913 to 1920.

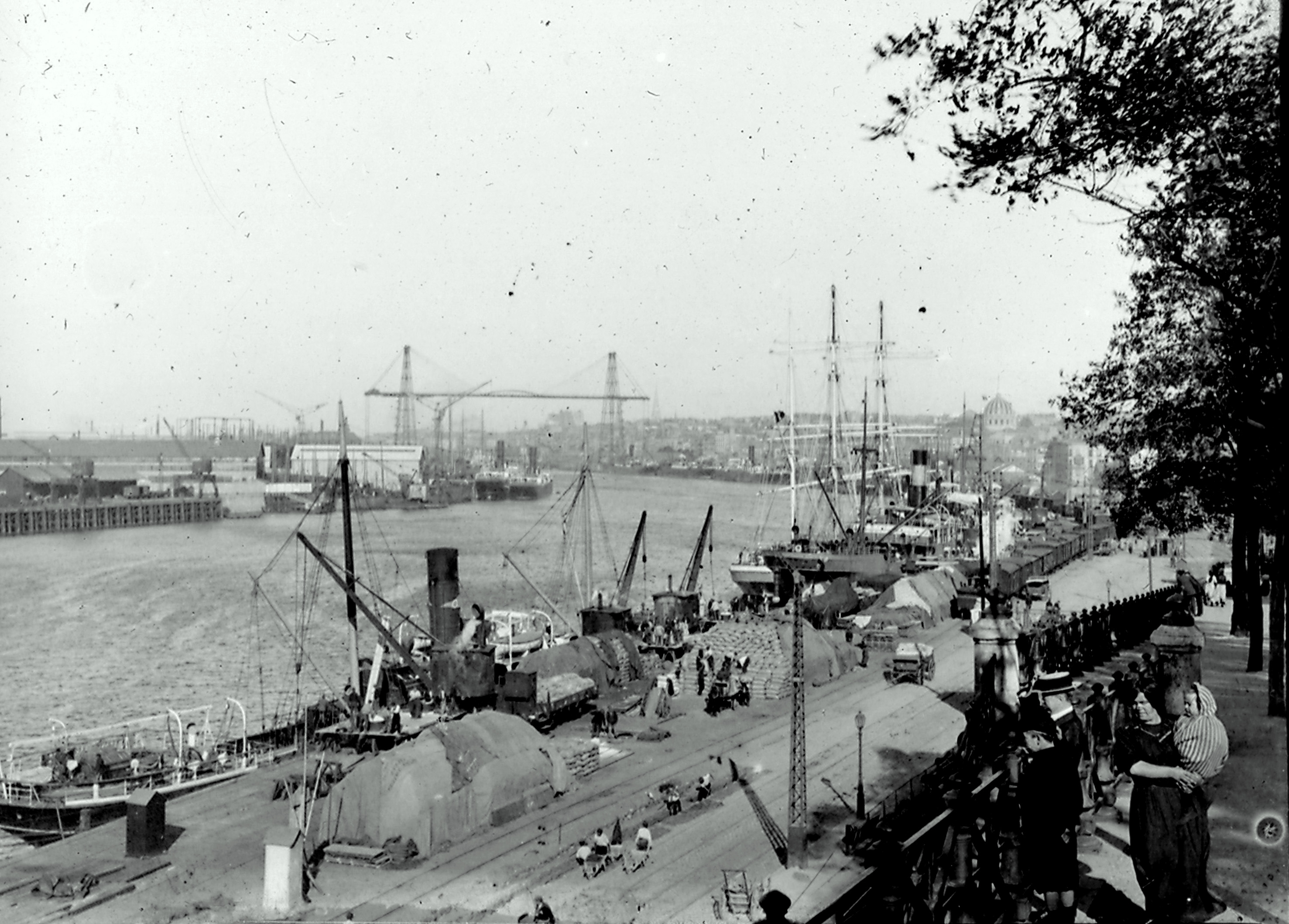
Port activity at the Fosse Wharf and transporter bridge in 1912.

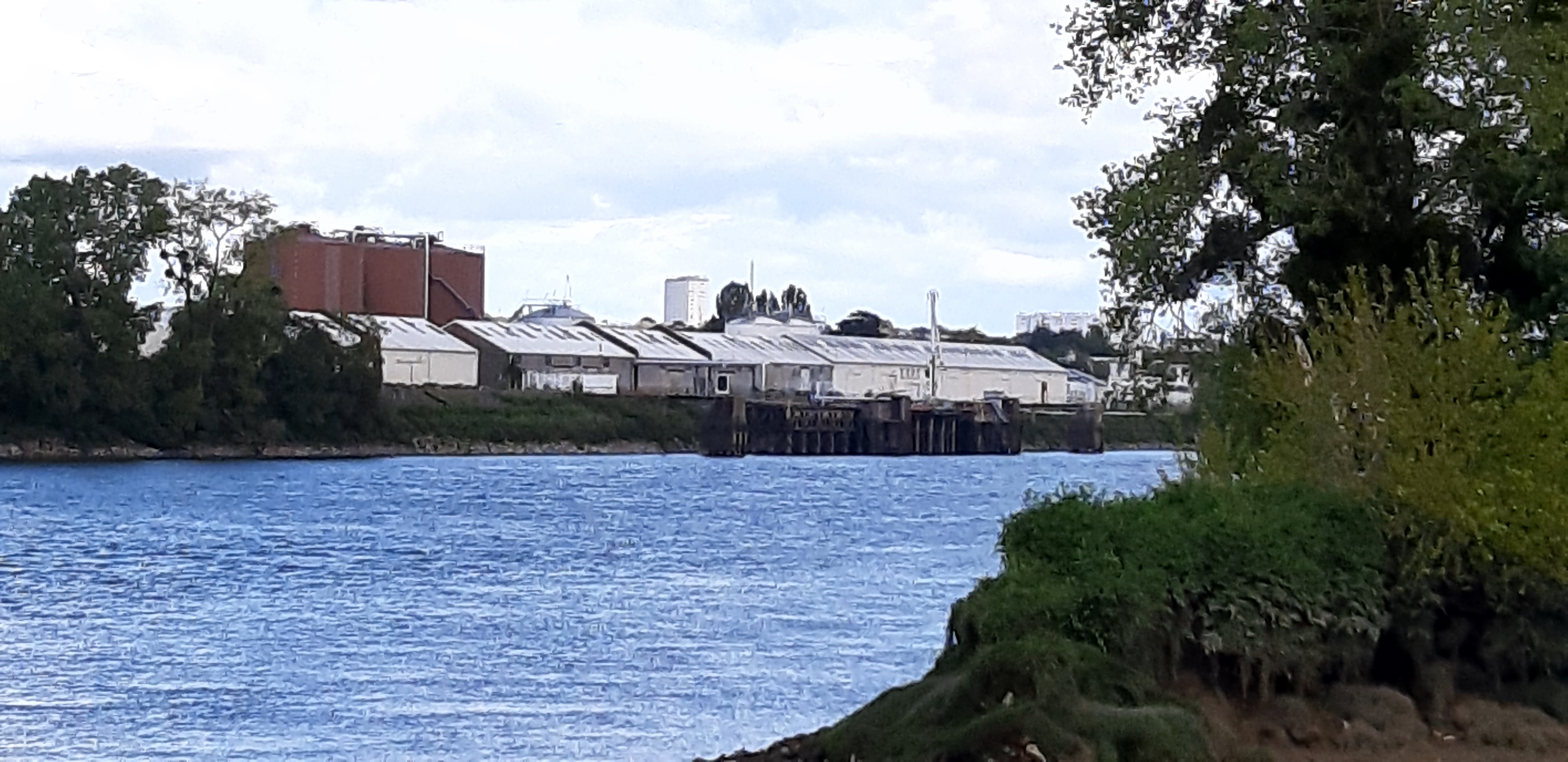
Boat docks, hangars, and storage tanks of the Usine Brûlée factory at the Émile Cormerais Wharf in Saint-Herblain, seen from Port Lavigne.

The Nantes Transporter Bridge was built on the port's grounds as early as 1903. It allowed workers, especially those at the shipyards, to cross the Madeleine branch of the Loire. Considered obsolete, the transporter bridge was dismantled in 1958. In 1913, the Lechalas launch, built at the Blasse et Fils shipyard in Chantenay, entered service. It was used from 1913 to 1968 by the Public Works Department for the port inspection tours by engineers. On Sunday, 14 June 1931, the ship Saint-Philibert took on passengers bound for the island of Noirmoutier for a day trip. On the return trip in the late afternoon, it sank due to a storm, resulting in the deaths of between 450 and 500 people (passengers and crew).

==== Under the occupation ====
During the Second World War, the German occupiers strictly prohibited civilian access to the port areas. Only personnel with a pass issued by the Hafenkommandantur (Note: This was the seat of the German port authority during the war, at the corner of Tourville Wharf and Haudaudine Bridge; it issued permits, managed infrastructure, and controlled access for ships.) were authorized. Following the destruction of the port of Saint-Nazaire, (Note: Notably, the bombing of Saint-Nazaire on 9 November 1942.) the port of Nantes gained increased importance for the Kriegsmarine. As a result, it was visited by Großadmiral Karl Dönitz on 25 August 1943. However, this strategic value also made it a target for the Allies. Consequently, just a few weeks later, it was subjected to bombings on 16 and 23 September 1943, primarily targeting the Quai de la Fosse. Due to the inaccuracy of the airstrikes, the port itself was relatively spared, but the bombs caused significant destruction and resulted in 1,463 civilian deaths in the city center. A few months later, on 9, 10 and 11 August 1944, the port's infrastructure was ransacked by the Germans themselves. Before leaving the city on 12 August 1944, and retreating to the Saint-Nazaire pocket, they destroyed the majority of the port infrastructure in Nantes that had survived the September 1943 bombings: 3 km (1.9 mi) of quays were mined, 60 cranes and 80% of the warehouses were put out of service, the shipyards and all bridges were destroyed, and ships were scuttled to block the Loire River.

==== After the liberation ====
After the war, the Marthe Richard Law of 13 April 1946, abolished the system of regulated prostitution in France, leading to the prohibition and closure of the thirteen brothels still operating in Nantes, on rue d'Ancin, rue des Marins, and rue des Trois Matelots, behind the Quai de la Fosse. In 1964, a first quay station measuring 146 meters in length was built at Cheviré and brought into service in June 1966, facing the Roche-Maurice terminal, on land reclaimed from former islands (Île Cheviré and Île Pointière) attached to the left bank of the Loire within the municipality of Nantes, along with some land in the neighboring communes of Bouguenais and Rezé. The terminal became the leading hub for timber trade in France.

Port handling equipment was managed by the Nantes Chamber of Commerce and Industry, while development works were under the responsibility of the Ponts et Chaussées administration until 1 April 1966. On that date, the Port of Nantes and the Port of Saint-Nazaire merged into a single entity, a public establishment of the State called the "Autonomous Port of Nantes-Saint-Nazaire," which incorporated the terminals of Donges (established from 1917) and those of Montoir-de-Bretagne (established from 1971).

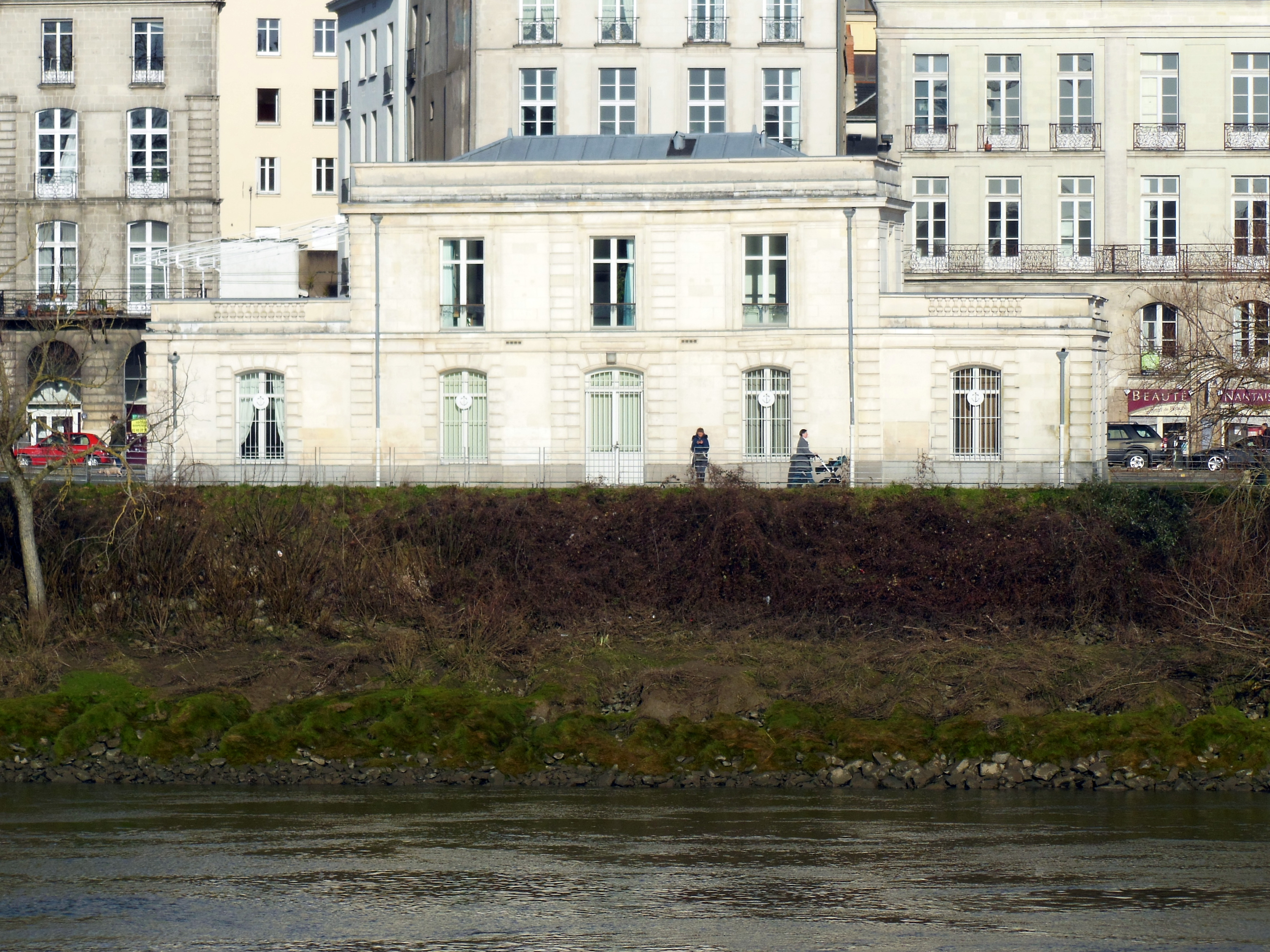
Port Office, Nantes port authority from 1883 to 1980, at the upstream end of the Quai de la Fosse.

In 1983, the harbor master's offices of Nantes and Saint-Nazaire were reorganized into a single service with authority over the entire estuary. (Note: Until 1983, there were separate port commanders for Nantes and Saint-Nazaire. The port commanders of Nantes were (by years of service): Armand Boudrot (1912–1930); Félix Étienne (1930–1948); Georges Lafforgues (1948–1953); François-Marie Audo (1953–1963); Roger Betton (1963–1972); Jean-Marie Colin (1972–1974); Pierre Trebern (1974–1983); Yves Lelaurent, port commander of Saint-Nazaire from 1979 to 1983, became the commander of both Nantes and Saint-Nazaire from 1983 to 1998.)

The growing importance of the Cheviré and Roche-Maurice sites led to the gradual cessation of operations at the Quai des Antilles and the Quai de la Fosse at the end of the 1980s.

Two incidents occurred four years apart at the port facilities:

- A fire broke out on 29 October 1987, in a fertilizer warehouse belonging to the company Loiret & Haentjens at Roche-Maurice, resulting in the formation of a toxic cloud and the evacuation of nearby residents for several hours;
- On 7 October 1991, an explosion followed by a fire devastated the depot of the Groupement pétrolier nantais, a subsidiary of the Petrofina company. Emergency services were able to quickly contain the fire and prevent it from spreading.

=== 21st century ===
The Wilson quay was closed in 2005, and its cranes were transferred to the Cheviré and Roche-Maurice sites, which also absorbed the associated traffic. That same year, 2005, the Navibus river shuttle service—heir to the historical Roquio ferry—was inaugurated. Operating within the waters managed by the Grand Port Maritime authority, it connects various port locations.

The Autonomous Port of Nantes-Saint-Nazaire officially became the Grand Port Maritime de Nantes-Saint-Nazaire on 9 October 2008.

== In the arts ==
=== Painting ===
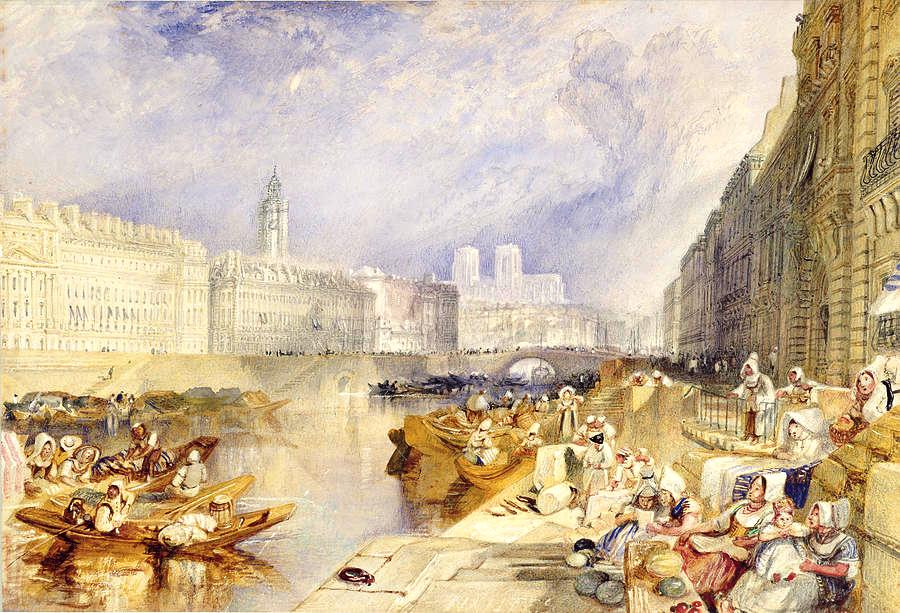
"Nantes from the Ile Feydeau," watercolor painted in 1829-30 by William Turner, Musée du Château des Ducs de Bretagne.

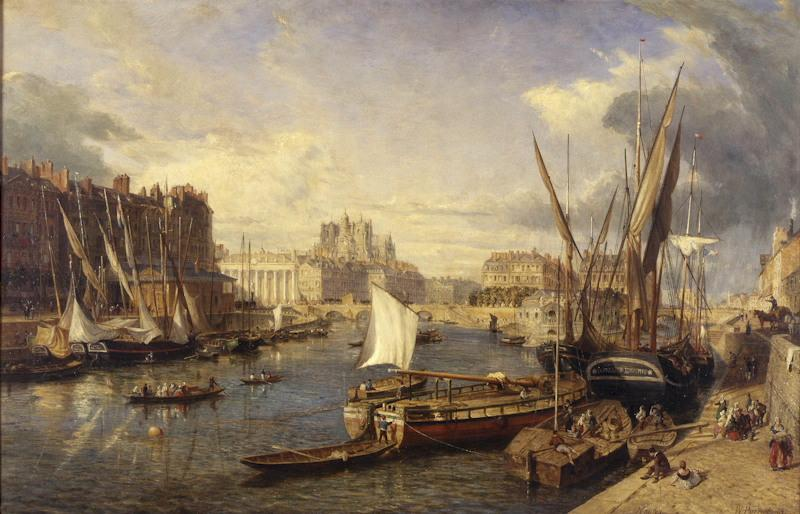
"Nantes, view from the banks of the Loire," oil painting created in 1864 by William Parrott (Dobrée Museum).

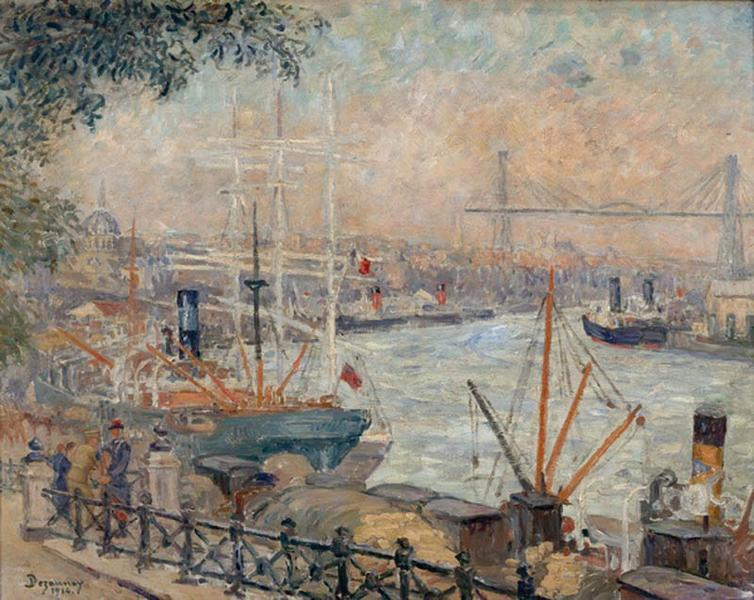
"The Port of Nantes," oil painting created in 1914 by Émile Dezaunay, Museum of the Dukes of Brittany.

=== Cinema ===
The port of Nantes (specifically the terminals at Roche-Maurice and the Quai de la Fosse) appears in scenes from Lola, a film by Jacques Demy, shot between June and July 1960.

== See also ==
- Port
- Bank (geography)
- Navibus

== Bibliography ==
- Descours, Catherine (2006). Le port de Nantes a 3000 ans [The port of Nantes is 3,000 years old] (in French). Giotto. ISBN 2-910561-24-0.
