= Palais de la Bourse =

Palais de la Bourse may refer to the Palais de la Bourse in:

- Paris
- Brussels
- Lyon
- Marseille
- Nantes
