= Palais de la Bourse (Nantes) =

Building in Nantes, France

Coordinates: 47°12′46″N 1°33′30″W

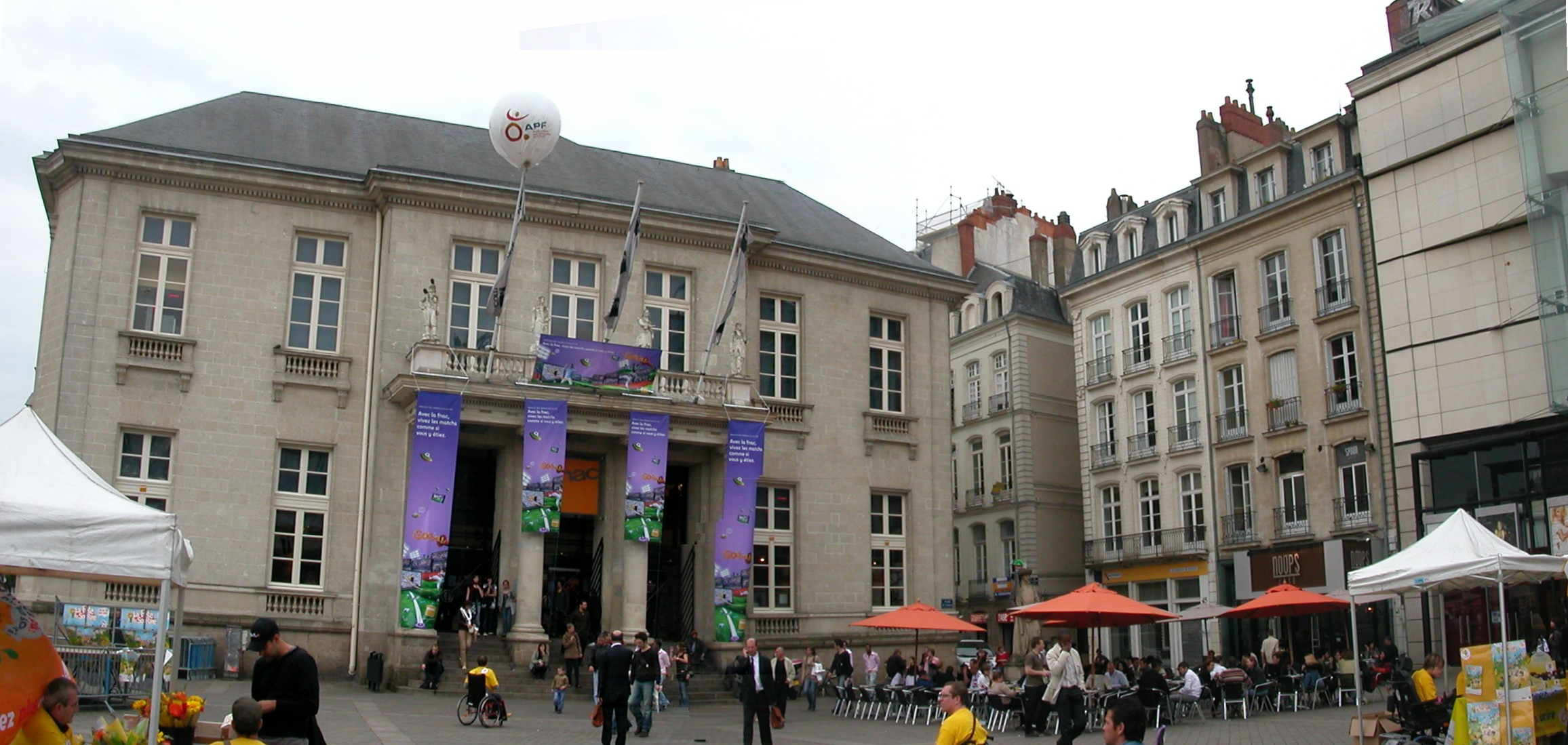
The palais de la Bourse, located on place du Commerce

The Palais de la Bourse is a historical building on place du Commerce in Nantes, France. Construction started at the end of the 18th century and completed in the 19th century, when the building first served as a commodities exchange ("bourse de commerce"). The building was registered as a historical monument on January 24, 1947. It was rebuilt at the end of the 20th century to house a branch of Fnac.
