= Representations of Anne of Brittany =

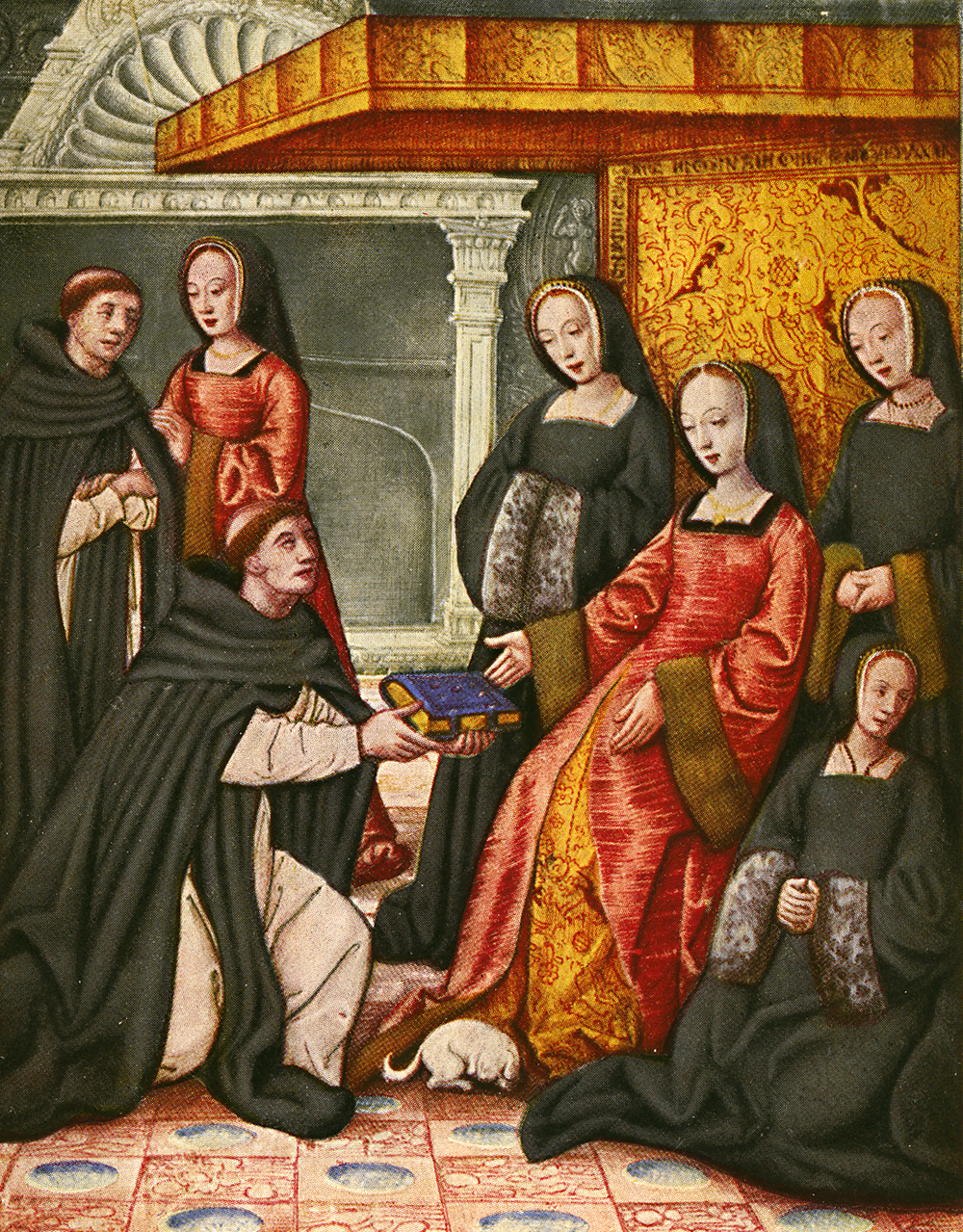
Anne of Brittany receiving from Antoine Dufour a book praising famous women. Miniature attributed to Jean Perréal, c. 1508

Anne of Brittany was the object of representations very early on. The royal propaganda of Charles VIII and, later on, of Louis XII idealized her as a symbol of the perfect queen, on the union between the kingdom and the duchy, and of the return to peace. Maximilian's Austria having been evicted from the marriage, had a different perspective on the events. Throughout the centuries, historians and popular imagery forged a very different Anne of Brittany, attributing her physical or psychological characteristics or actions that are not necessarily verifiable through historical data.

== Sources ==
=== Anne of Brittany's physique ===
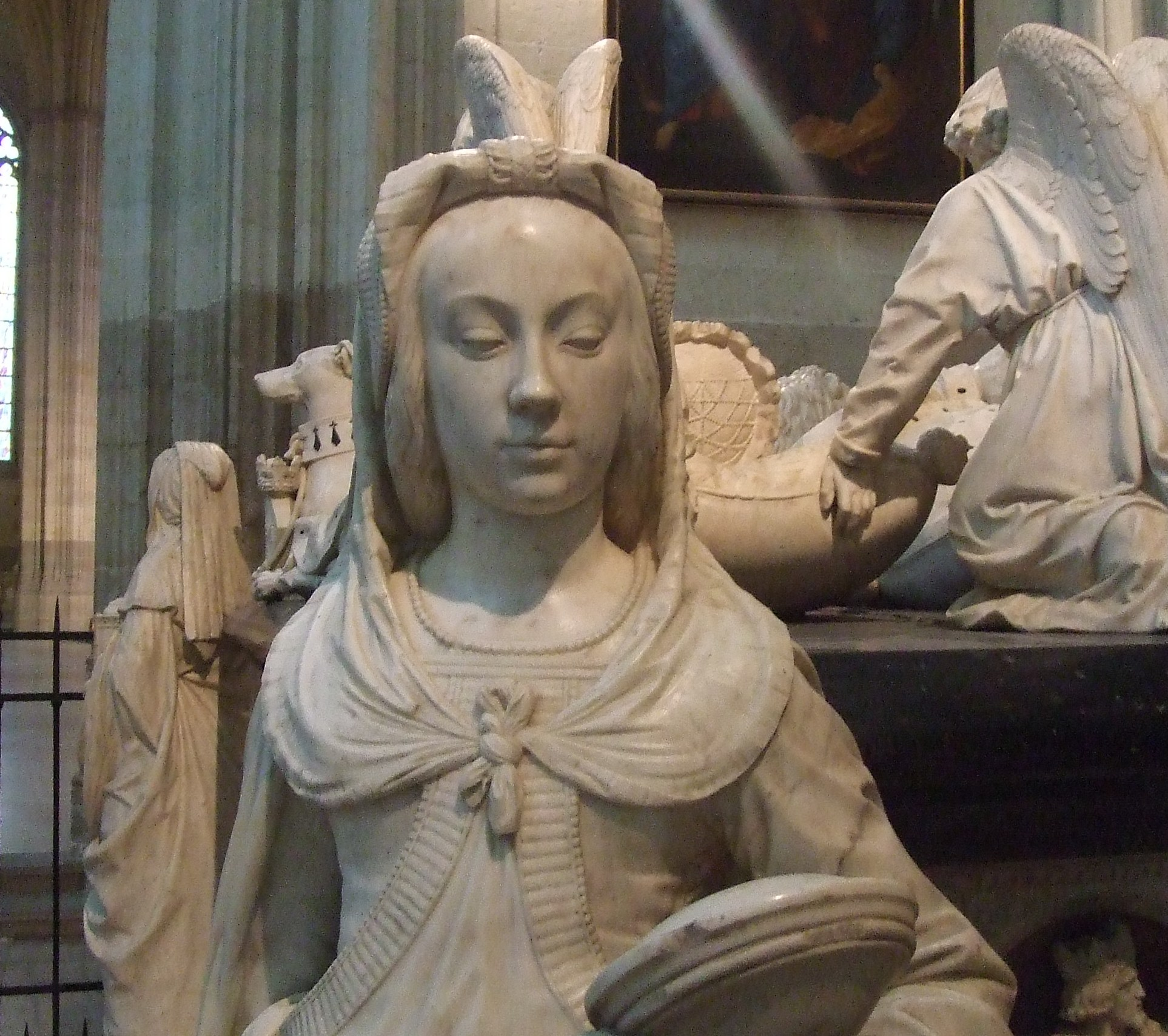
The allegorical figure of Prudence on the tomb of Anne's father Francis seems to have Anne's features. After the death of Francis, Disarvoez Penguern published a poem in which he praised Anne as a wise new duchess whose highest virtue was prudence ("sa grande vertu, prudence").

We have a few descriptions of Anne of Brittany's physique provided by chroniclers, a good number of portraits on wood or on illuminated manuscripts, her profile on medals, the statues on her funeral monument in Basilica of Saint Denis and maybe her face sculpted by Michel Colombe as the allegory of Prudence, at a corner of the tomb of Francis II in Nantes. At the time, physical beauty was not as praised and was to be only the reflection of moral beauty. The portraits and sculptures present a woman with a regular and pleasant face, meeting the universal canons and 15th and 16th century Europe. These are all ordered works and present few distinctive features:

- under Charles VIII, her representations are without personality: she is only a queen, next to her husband;
- under Louis XII, she personifies peace, the union between Brittany and France: she is given the traits of the Virgin Mary.

Anne of Brittany was, however, generally represented as a blonde. The contemporary descriptions feature clothing appropriate to her rank: brocade dresses enhanced with fur, necklaces, jewellery, and hennin. Zaccaria Contarini, ambassador of Venice, describes her in the following manner in 1492:

The Queen is 17, she is of small height, slender, and she walks with a visible limp, even though she wears high heels shoes to hide her deformity. She is of dark complexion and is fairly pretty. Her wit is remarkable for her age and once she has set her mind on doing something, she makes sure she succeeds, by all means necessary and at any price.

=== Symbol of the Union between France and Brittany ===
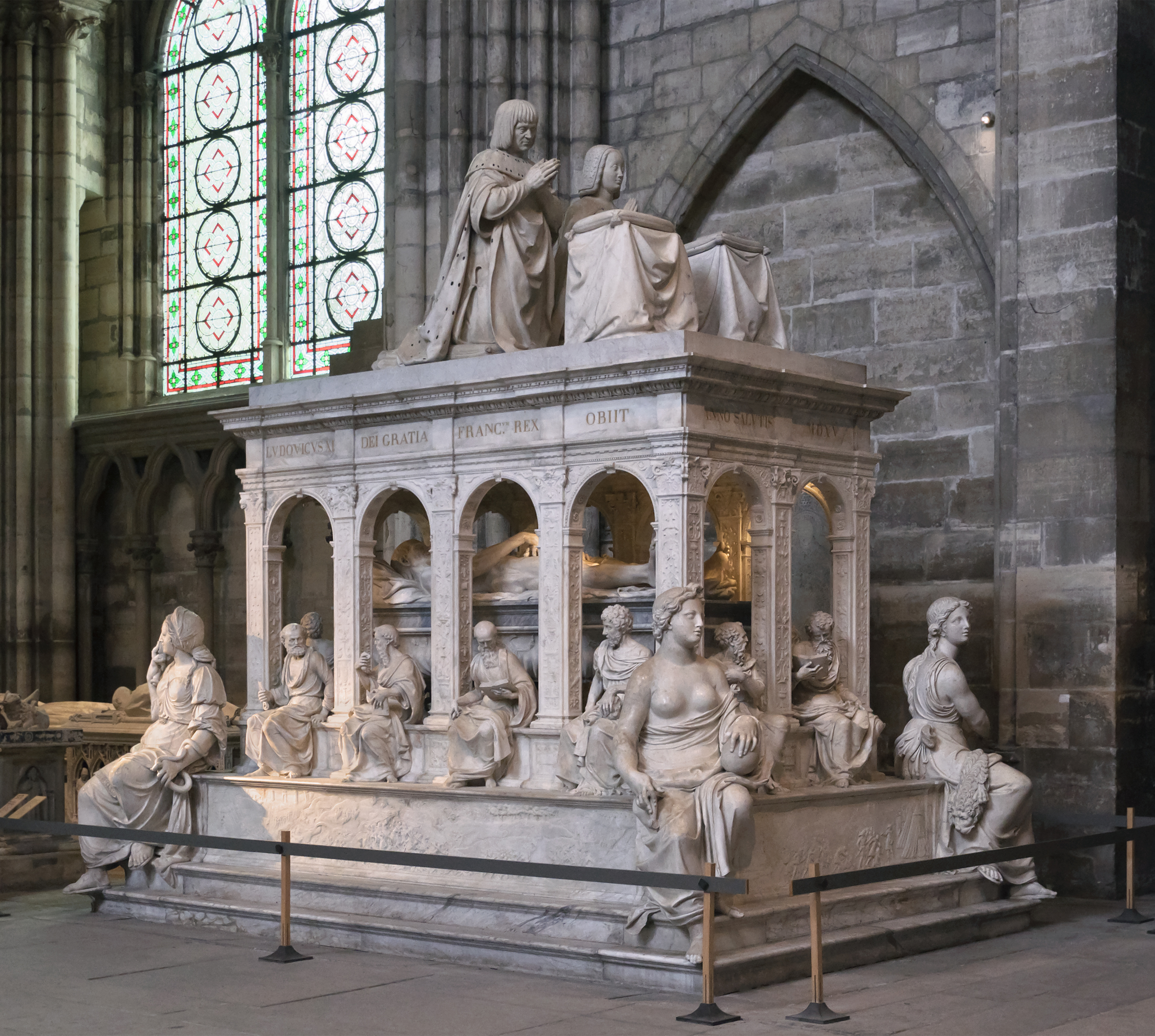
Tomb of Louis and Anne

The image that Anne spreads of herself, through commissions (portraits, stories), is one of a queen personifying the union between France and Brittany. Until the incorporation of Brittany into France was assured, she is called Reine de Sure Alliance (Queen of the Certain Alliance). She is devoted, like all queens of France, to her kingdom. She appears as a symbol of peace and union between France and Brittany, mostly after her marriage to Louis XII, which is why she is nicknamed "Dame Union" after her third wedding.

In the arts, France was then represented as an enchanted garden (a tradition since the beginning of the 14th century), where porcupines (symbol of Louis XII) and ermines (symbol of Anne of Brittany) run. She is endowed with the virtues suiting the queen of France: she is liberal, pious and loving, and contributes these three qualities to the government (generosity, prayer and love for the king), a living example for the subjects of the kingdom.

These public displays of attachment reinforce the alliance between the Breton people and the French. The Marie de la Cordelière episode (10 August 1512), during the war against England, shows that the two peoples were coming closer together, even though some Bretons were reluctant to fight for "an excommunicated monarch". At the Battle of St. Mathieu a united Franco-Breton fleet fought the English marine, with the warship Marie de la Cordelière, flying the Breton pavilion, in front.

Anne of Brittany commissions three histories of Brittany over the course of her life:

- the first is commissioned in 1498 to Pierre Le Baud (who had already written one in 1480 for Jean Derval), traces the history of the province from Conan Meriadoc to Francis II and is edited in 1515;
- the second is commissioned to Alain Bouchard, advisor to Francis II and lawyer in the Parliament; finished and edited in 1514, then reedited in 1518, 1531, 1532 and 1541. Each edition includes additions (on the reigns of the kings of France, starting with Charles VIII);
- the third is commissioned in 1512 to Jean Lemaire de Belges, but is never edited.

== Evolution of Anne of Brittany's image ==
In his essay on the queen's biographies, Anne de Bretagne, Didier Le Fur takes the image that a number of writers and historians have given of Anne through the centuries after her death and compares it with the sources available to him. He concludes that the story of Anne of Brittany has been enriched by hagiographical or depreciatory elements, not recounted in the writings contemporary to the duchess, hard to prove or invented. The following paragraphs synthesize most of the arguments found in his book. Georges Minois' Anne de Bretagne draws, on the contrary, a non-lenient portrait of Anne by a critical reading of the sources.

=== Anne, "heroic orphan" and a duchess loved by the Bretons ===
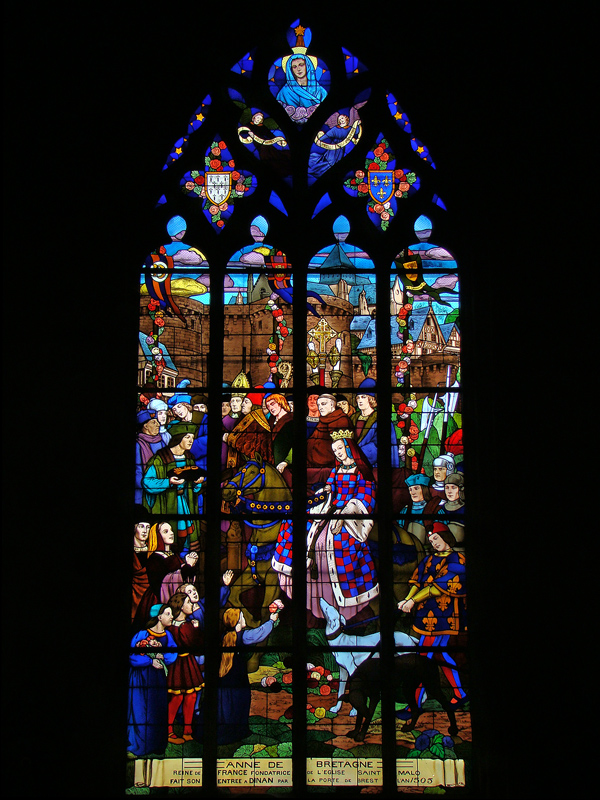
Stained glass window depicting Anne as a duchess loved by the Bretons. Anne enters Dinan to cheering crowds.

The reedition of Bouchard's Histoire de Bretagne from 1518 includes an addition on her trip to Brittany in 1505 (while the king was sick and which includes a pilgrimage) to insist on the festive atmosphere of the trip and on the reciprocal love between the Queen and her duchy (which is not a compulsory figure of the royal voyages accounts, popular affection being the best manifestation of the legitimacy of the kings). The government of Brittany by Louis XII is not related by Bouchard, who states, on the contrary, that Anne of Brittany governed the duchy by herself, and that she defended Brittany's privileges. These additions where deleted in 1531 (during the negotiation of the Union Treaty) and reintroduced in 1532 and 1541. This story is there to defend the privileges of the Breton nobility and, as an incitation, a reminder for the king to respect them. Four years after her death, Anne is presented as a person loved by her people and while there is no trace of this through her lifetime, this emotional relationship was to be reused in the following centuries.

In 1577, the States of Brittany opposed the levying of new taxes. This position is based upon Anne's second wedding contract and use as a justification the Annales de Bretagne to Bertrand d'Argenté, Breton law scholar and grand-nephew of Le Beaud. These Annales, edited in Rennes in 1582 and Paris in 1588, 1605, 1611, 1618 and 1668, create an outcry (d'Argenté is accused of supporting the claims of the Duke of Mercœur on the Duchy of Brittany), are partially censored and open a debate on the suzerainty of the king of France on Brittany. Henri III commissions a refutation to Nicolas Vignier (who dies in 1596; his story is published in 1619). Based on a few acts signed by Anne between 1489 and 1491 and on two quotes, he creates the image of a young girl, called "the heroic orphan" by Didier Le Fur:

- who governs the Breton state between 1488 and 1491 (from ages 11 to 14);
- and who has to face a brutal campaign by Charles VIII.

This image is used and amplified afterwards. François de Mézeray, royal historian, adds, in 1646, that she leads the campaign by herself, refuses to see others govern in her place (in 1489–91) and rejects an imposed wedding. He uses the thesis of her will to govern Brittany by herself. He does so in order to justify the capacity of a woman, Anne of Austria, then the regent of Louis XIV, to govern France, a little before the Fronde.

The second contesting of the levying of new taxes takes place in Brittany at the end of the 17th century, with the rebellion against the papier timbré. This episode started a new wave of stories of Brittany, including a commission by the Breton States to the Benedictines of Saint-Maur. It was started by Dom Audren, who died while he was writing it, and finished by Dom Lobineau. It uses the thesis of d'Argenté and also created an outcry, without being censored. It was refuted by abbé Vertot. Lobineau transforms what were private considerations about the refusal to marry Alain d'Albret into political will; she makes a sacrifice during the 1489–1491 war for the happiness of her people.

At the beginning of the 18th century, the image of Anne of Brittany is more one of a duchess than of a queen, more attached to her duchy than to the kingdom of France with, for instance, the Histoire de Bretagne by abbé Desfontaines (1739), which has been used since: he states that "the title of duchess was dearer to her than that of queen"; he multiplies her trips to Brittany; Anne of Brittany is saddened by the union of Brittany to France. For Le Fur, her will to govern by herself becomes obvious. The "heroic orphan" image develops afterwards: she campaigns alone, with her people, against the king of France. The numerous patriotic episodes are invented.

In the 19th century, her character as defender of Breton independence is accentuated: in one book, she appears at the Battle of Saint-Aubin-du-Cormier, she loves only her native land, her trips take the Bretons out of their state of lethargy, encourage the founding of covenants and the construction of religious buildings. Her biographies of the 19th century are devoted, for half of them, to her youth (until 1491), a period of her life for which sources are very few. After 1850, in the regional histories and sometimes in the republican, Anne of Brittany is never presented as French; she is the one who preserves the autonomy of Brittany after 1491. It becomes obvious, even to major historians like Arthur Le Moyne de La Borderie.

With the creation of the separatist movement in 1911, Anne makes the sacrifice of her life in order to preserve the name and independence of Brittany. She does nothing for the union of the duchy to France which becomes guilty of not respecting its engagements. In 1934, a little-known historian, Bardin, even compares her to Joan of Arc.

Finally, Didier Le Fur systematically finds these characteristics of autonomism in all the descriptions made of duchess Anne in the histories of Brittany after 1945.

=== The forced wedding ===
Of this image of the Breton duchess, attached to the independence and happiness of her duchy, derives another myth: that of the forced wedding, accepted in the face of an incompatible struggle against the king of France and the defence of the autonomy of the duchy. The story of the forced wedding is based on an extract by Jean de Molinet, a historian from Burgundy attached to Margaret of Austria, who was abandoned by Charles VIII to the benefit of Anne of Brittany. In the extract, Anne has more affection for Maximilian of Austria than for the king of France. The latter becomes Anne's mortal enemy. The only reason for the wedding is interests of State.

This thesis is corroborated by the royal chronicler Philippe de Commines.

Bernard d'Argenté uses the same vision: the histories of Brittany after him transform Maximilian into an accepted husband because he is far (thus preserving the autonomy of the duchy) but condemn him because he does not defend his wife; the wedding with Charles VIII disgusts Anne, for religious (her engagement to Maximilian of Austria is the theme that gave birth to the legend of her piety, and then of her bigotry) and political reasons: she makes a sacrifice. This sacrifice becomes more and more important in the stories of the 19th century and even her wedding to Maximilian becomes one.

The abduction theme, derived from the Austrian propaganda of 1491–1492, reappears in the middle of the 19th century and is profusely used by separatists (who state that the abduction story came from "a popular tradition"), the abduction is being used to delegitimized the union of Brittany to France. It was also used in the 1940s by Breton nationalists, who interpreted it a sign that Brittany should have been unified with the Holy Roman Empire (centred in Germany) rather than France. The pro-Nazi Breton National Party sought to ally an independent Brittany with Hitler's new empire.

=== Bad temper and traitor to France ===
This part of the posthumous image of Anne comes from royal, then national stories.

Her reputation of having a bad temper comes from an extract of the Mémoires of Philippe de Commines, in which she shows rancour towards Louis of Orléans. She is portrayed in a happy mood, even shortly after the death of the child she had by Charles VIII. This aspect of her personality was ignored until the 17th century and was then used and amplified by Pierre de Brantôme. With a partial reading of a few sources (the trial of the maréchal de Gié), she becomes cynical, calculating and devoured by ambition: this trial "reveals" her desire to flee to Brittany. From the 18th century on, she is depicted as dominating Louis XII, who is in love with her; her advice is claimed to have provoked the defeats of 1512–1513; she wanted to steal the royal treasury (episode by Gié during her imagined escape) and she is willing to make an alliance with the enemies of France. This description culminates with Michelet, who describes Louis XII as a feeble king, dominated by his wife. After him, histories of France give her numerous faults, linked to her preference for her native duchy.

=== Anne, "duchess in clogs", an idealized image ===
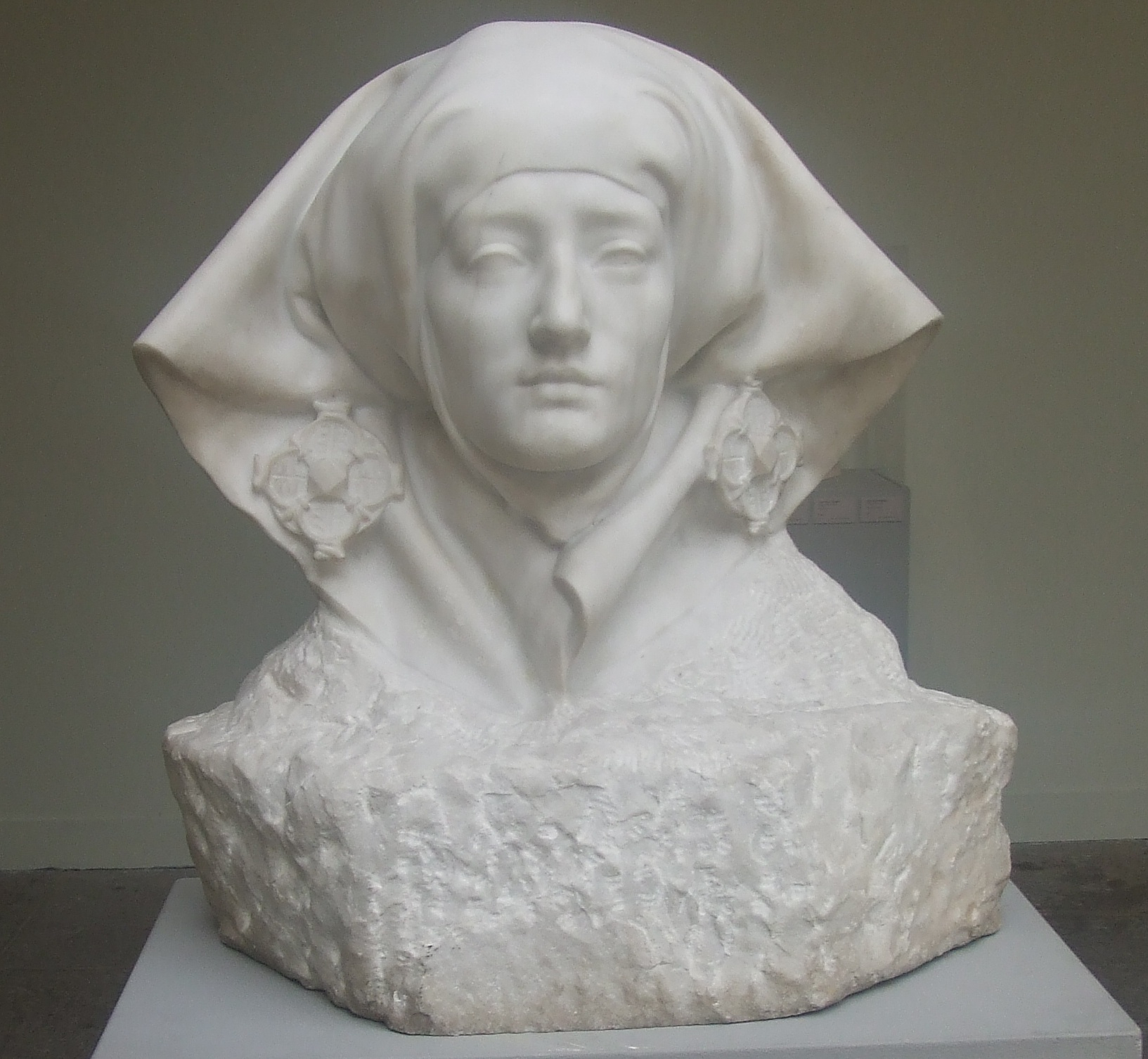
Anne of Brittany by Jean Boucher

For Didier le Fur, Breton regionalists, as soon as the Breton Association was founded, were searching for a personality capable of personifying their ideal view of an agrarian and regional renewal, while manifesting their attachment to the French nation. They choose Anne of Brittany, who is increasingly portrayed in Breton costume in images. As prescribed by decorum in the 15th century, the duchess permanently wears a headdress (see contemporary representations of the duchess). For Didier Le Fur, the regionalists use this clothing accessory to attach Anne to their people, and to demonstrate the simplicity of the national (Breton) tastes. Didier Le Fur later indicates that regionalists give Anne simple and dark clothing (with the exception of official ceremonies, during which she wears sumptuous clothes, as seen on the official iconography). But the headdress was also adopted by the Breton bourgeoisie at the end of the 19th, which mitigates the peasant character of the portrayal of Anne at this time.

At the end of the 19th century, Anne becomes popularly known as "la bonne duchesse". The expression "Anne of Brittany, duchess in clogs" also becomes popular, based on a nursery rhyme Les Sabots d'Anne de Bretagne. Le Fur describes the song as a parody of another one, En passant par la Lorraine. This song appears in 1880 because of Adolphe Orain who is said to have collected it in the Ille-et-Vilaine region and he added a verse. The song originally becomes popular in children's literature. It is then adapted for the participants in the Celtic banquets of Paris who sing it at the end of the meal as early as 1884, which make it the Marseillaise of the Bretons. Historically, this image of the duchess in clogs was never justified, neither was it ever presented as a historical truth. Historians start to question it in 1976. The expression, well known in France in the early 20th century, is still used today in a number of history books as well as in children's literature and touristic pamphlets.

== Depictions in art, fiction and drama ==
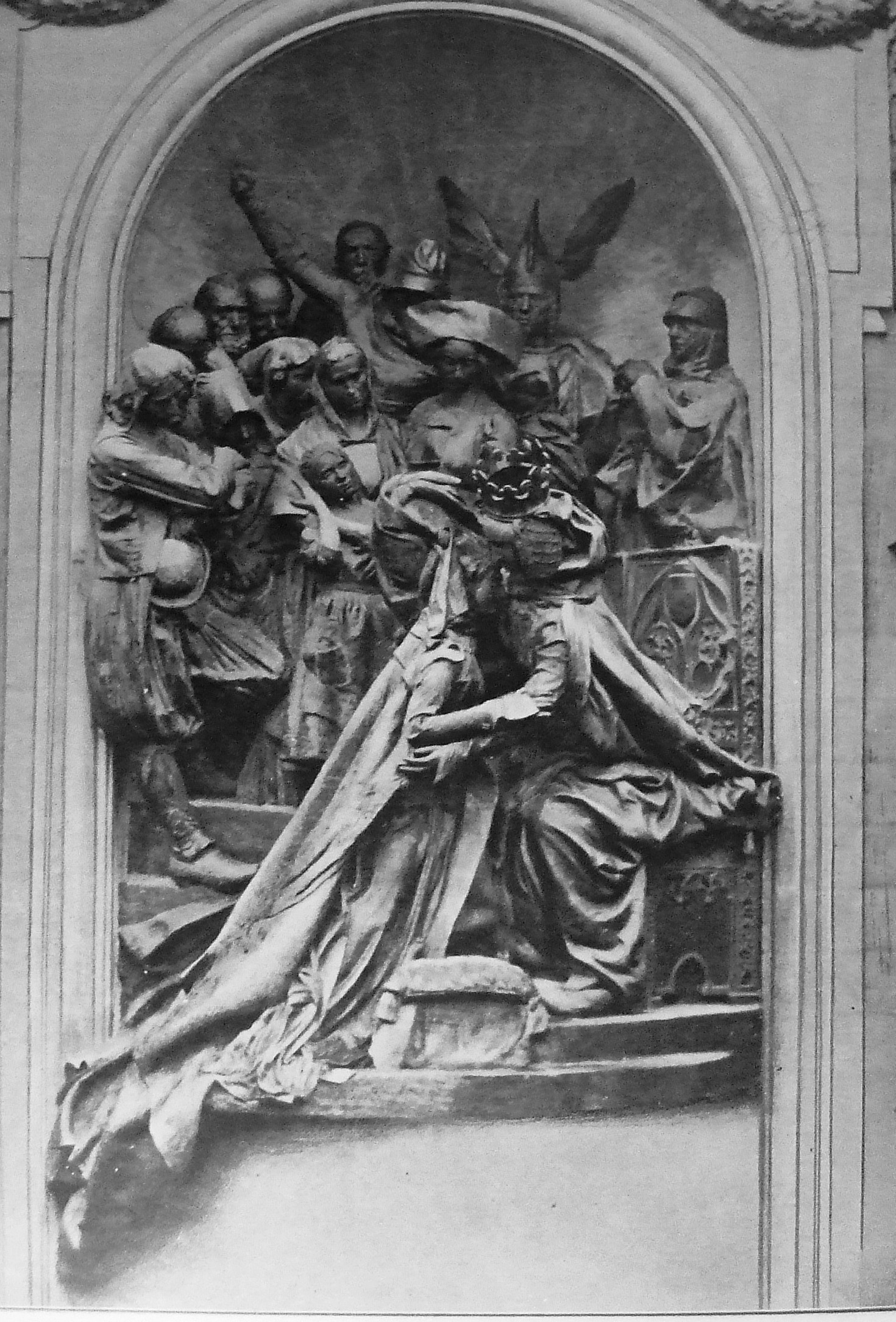
Anne embraces Charles VIII: Monument to the Union of Brittany and France, destroyed in 1932

Anne is widely portrayed in dramatisations and artworks, mostly in Brittany. Many of these date from the turn of the nineteenth-twentieth centuries. A stained glass window in Vannes Town Hall depicts her marriage to Charles VIII, as does a tapestry, formerly in the Parlement of Rennes, Rennes. Her marriage was also depicted in a large bronze sculpture in Rennes Town Hall, which was destroyed by Breton nationalists in 1932. She appears greeting the Breton people in a large stained glass window in the Church of Saint Malo in Dinan. A statue by Jean Fréour is placed outside the castle of the Dukes in Nantes.

She is also depicted in musical works. Anne de Bretagne was the title of an opera composed by Louis-Albert Bourgault-Ducoudray in the 1870s. Bourgault, himself distantly related to Anne, was also born in Nantes and aimed to promote Breton culture throughout much of his music. Two operas, also called Anne de Bretagne, were also created in the 21st century. Anne de Bretagne, an opera by Breton composer Pierick Houdy, libretto by Jean-Michel Fournereau, was first performed in Rennes 2001, featuring Agnès Bove in the title role. Houdy also wrote an Anne de Bretagne Mass. The second operatic work was the rock opera Anne de Bretagne, by Alan Simon, was first performed in Nantes in June 2009 starring Cécile Corbel (as Anne), Fairport Convention, Nilda Fernandez, Tri Yann, Les Holroyd, and others.

Anne is also referred to in songs. A song of Gilles Servat evokes her life: Kaoc'h ki gwenn ha kaoc'h ki du. If dead died, an anonymous poem going back to her funeral, and now performed by the popular Breton folk musicians Tri Yann. Another song of their repertory refers to the Duchess.

Her name is widely used in other contexts, such as Duchesse Anne, the name of a beer produced in Brittany. The square three-masted ship Duchesse Anne, is currently moored in the Port of Dunkirk.

Anne is the subject of Eleanor Fairburn's historical novel, Crowned Ermine, published in 1968.

An alternate history of Anne is the main focus of Katherine Arden's 2026 fantasy novel The Unicorn Hunters.

Anne plays a large role in Robin LaFevers' historical YA series His Fair Assassin.

== See also ==
- Cultural depictions of Maximilian I, Holy Roman Emperor
