= Tomb of Francis II of Brittany =

Monument located in Nantes, in the Cathedral of St. Peter

Coordinates: 47°13′5.61″N 1°33′0.42″W

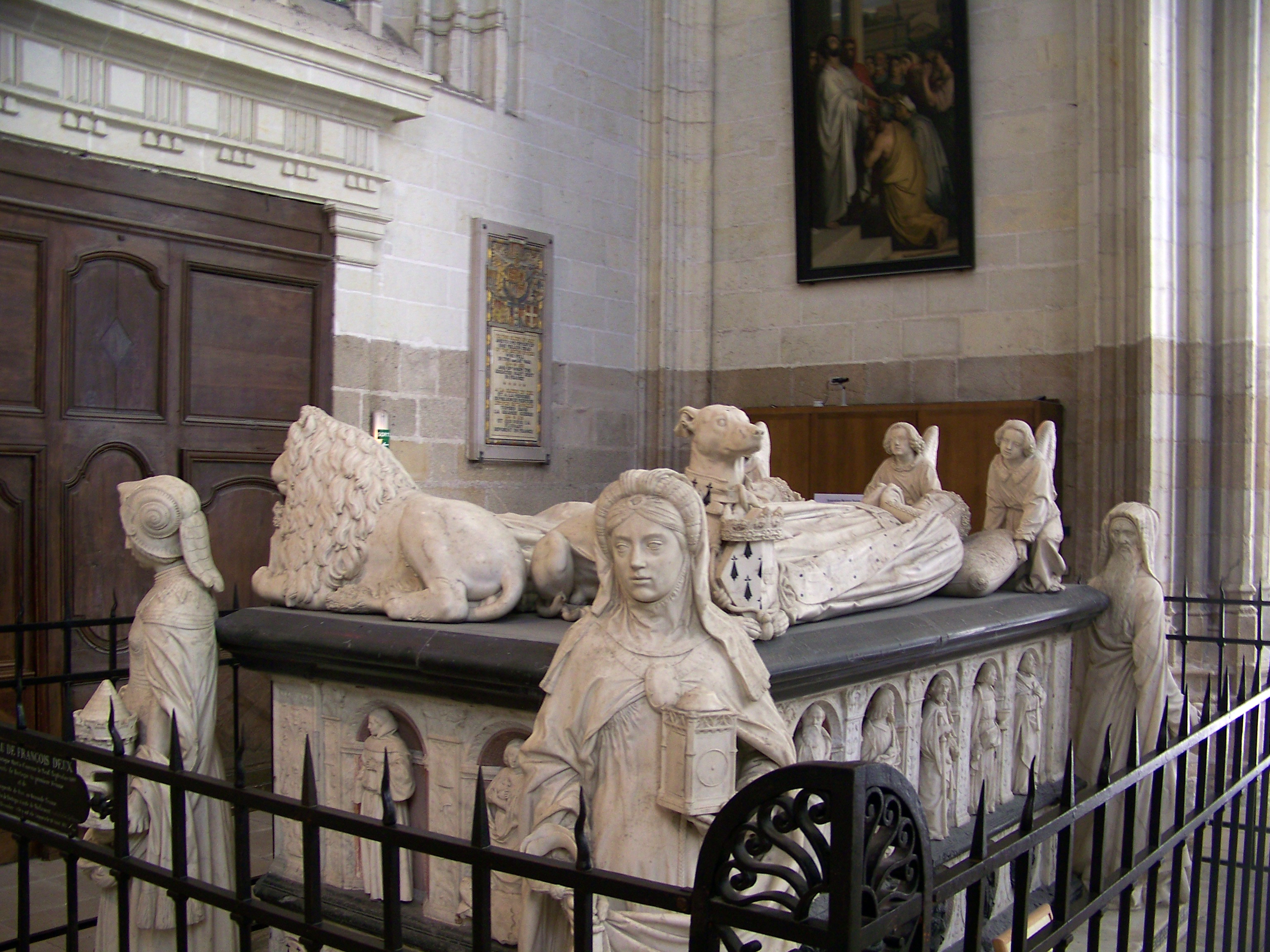
The tomb

The tomb of Francis II of Brittany is a monument located in Nantes, in the Cathedral of St. Peter. The project was commissioned by Anne of Brittany, Queen of France, who was the daughter of Francis and his second wife Margaret of Foix, who is also depicted beside Francis. The tomb was originally located in the chapel of the Carmelites in Nantes. Francis II had wished that his body rest there, to join the remains of his first wife Margaret of Brittany. The tomb eventually received the body of Francis and both his wives, though only his second wife (Anne's mother) is depicted.

It was executed in Carrara marble in the early sixteenth century by the sculptor Michel Colombe based on a design by the royal artist Jean Perréal. It is the first major work of art in the Renaissance style in Brittany and is considered a masterpiece of French sculpture.

== History of the tomb ==
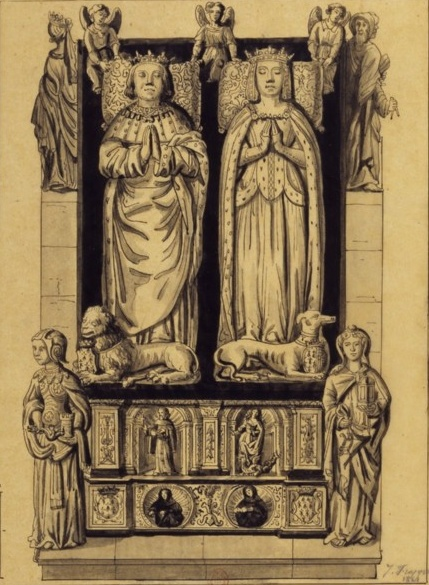
18th century illustration of the tomb

The project was commissioned by Anne to honour the memory of her parents. Originally known as the "tomb of the Carmelites", the monument was named from its location. It was completed in 1507.

During the French Revolution, it managed to avoid the revolutionary vandalism that affected many royal and aristocratic monuments. The architect Mathurin Crucy organised its removal when the chapel of the Carmelites was destroyed. It was dismantled and hidden. It was later restored to completion, and finally found a place at the cathedral in the early nineteenth century. Bones believed to be those of Arthur III, Duke of Brittany were also reinterred within it.

== Description ==
The monument consists of a rectangular sarcophagus 3.90 m long, 2.33 m wide, and 1.27 m tall. The gisants (recumbent effigies) of the deceased couple are lying prostrate with hands raised in prayer. Their heads rest on thick pillows held up by three angels. Margaret's feet are on a greyhound, a symbol of fidelity; Francis's feet rest on a lion, representing strength. At the four corners of the tomb stand four statues, each representing one of the cardinal virtues: Courage, Justice, Temperance and Prudence.

Around the tomb are other delicate sculptures in small niches of pink marble. These represent in turn the twelve apostles; the patron saints of the two deceased persons (Saint Francis of Assisi and Saint Margaret); Charlemagne and Saint Louis.

Under these statues, huddled in small shell-shaped medallions, we see penitent mourners draped in black.

The tomb is a classified historical monument.

== The recumbent figures ==
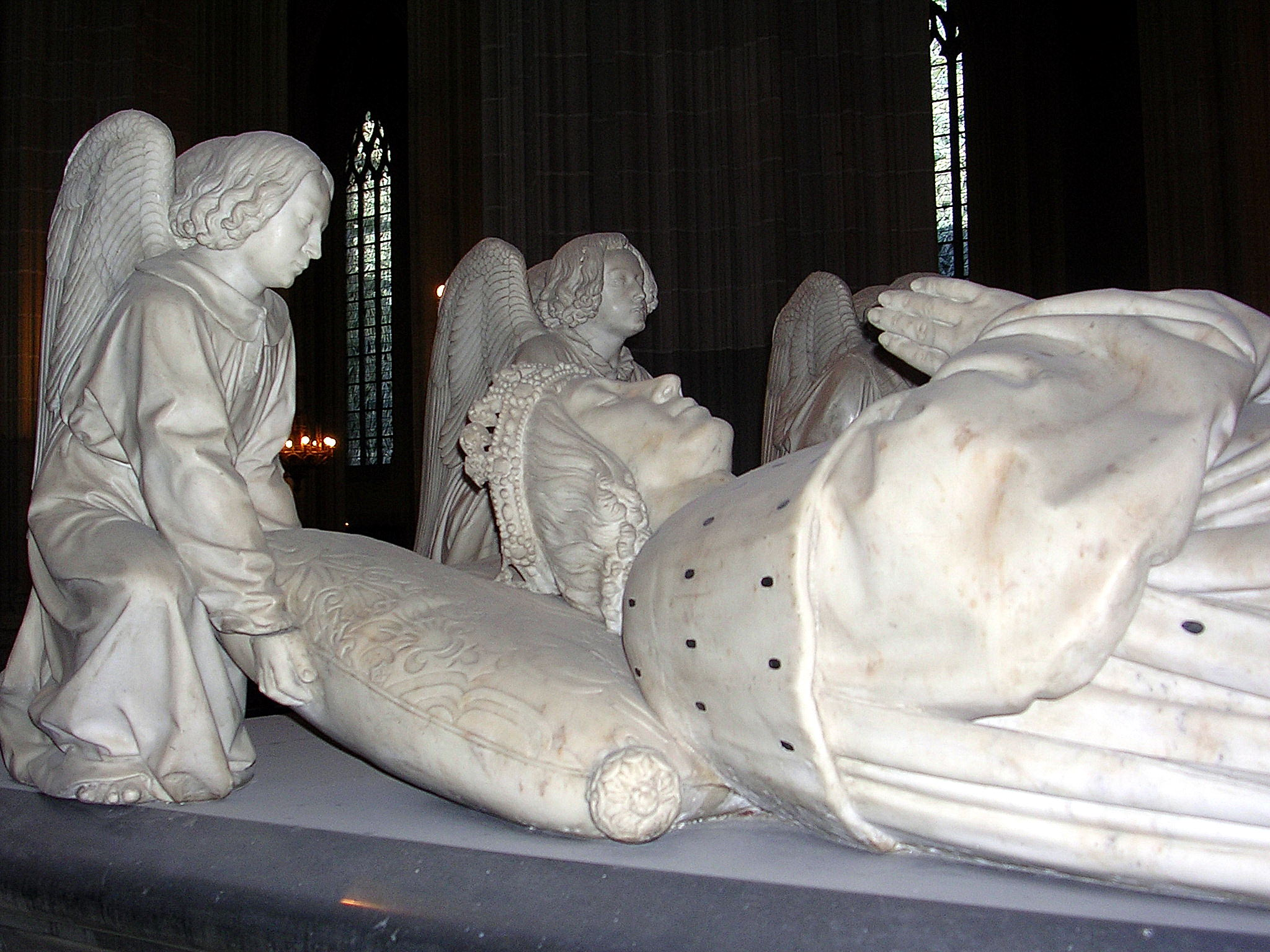
François II, detail

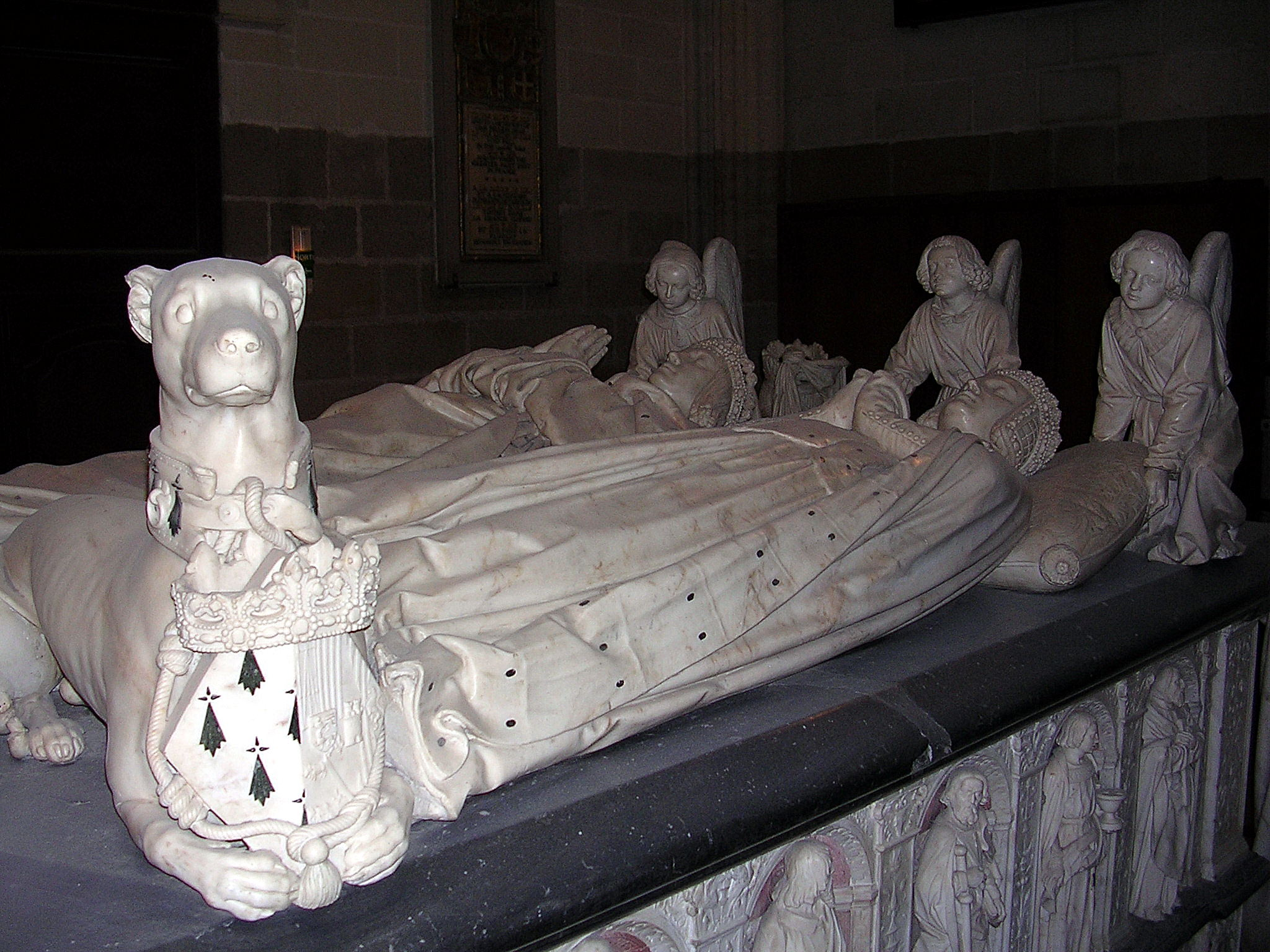
Recumbent figures

== Corner statues ==
The allegorical figures of women represent the four cardinal virtues, indicators of the virtuous path that the prince and that all men are called to follow:

The cardinal virtues

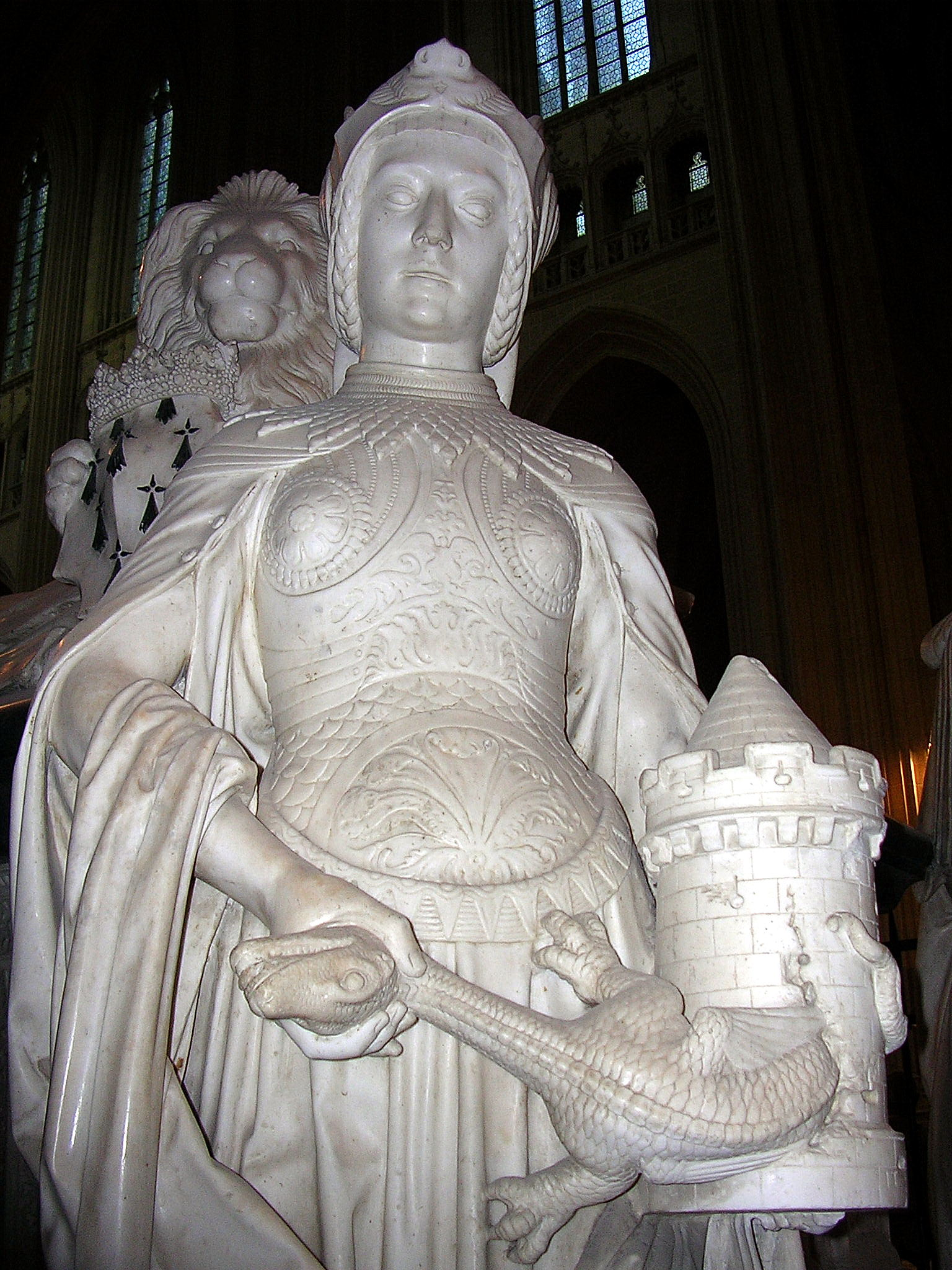
Courage

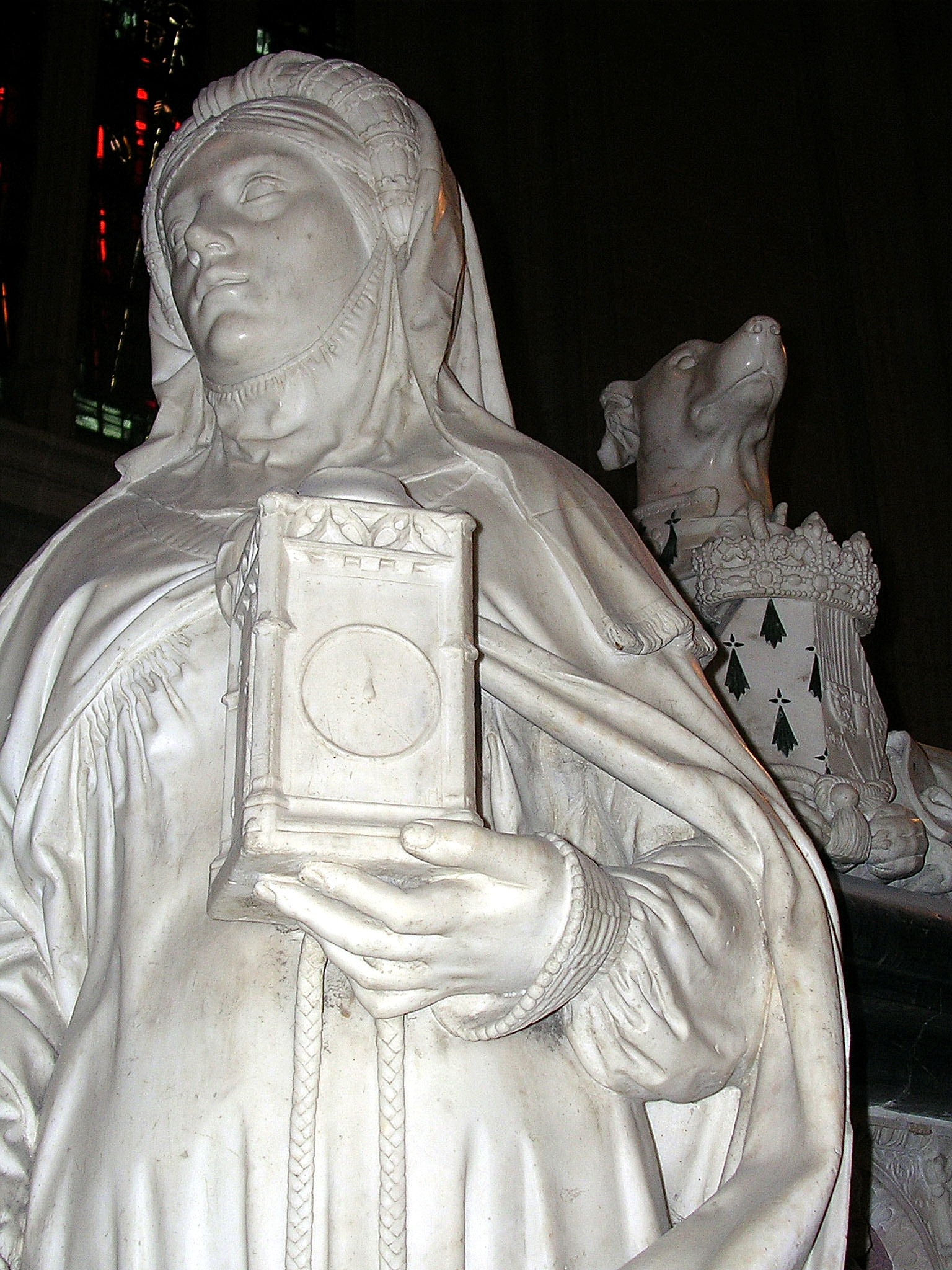
Temperance

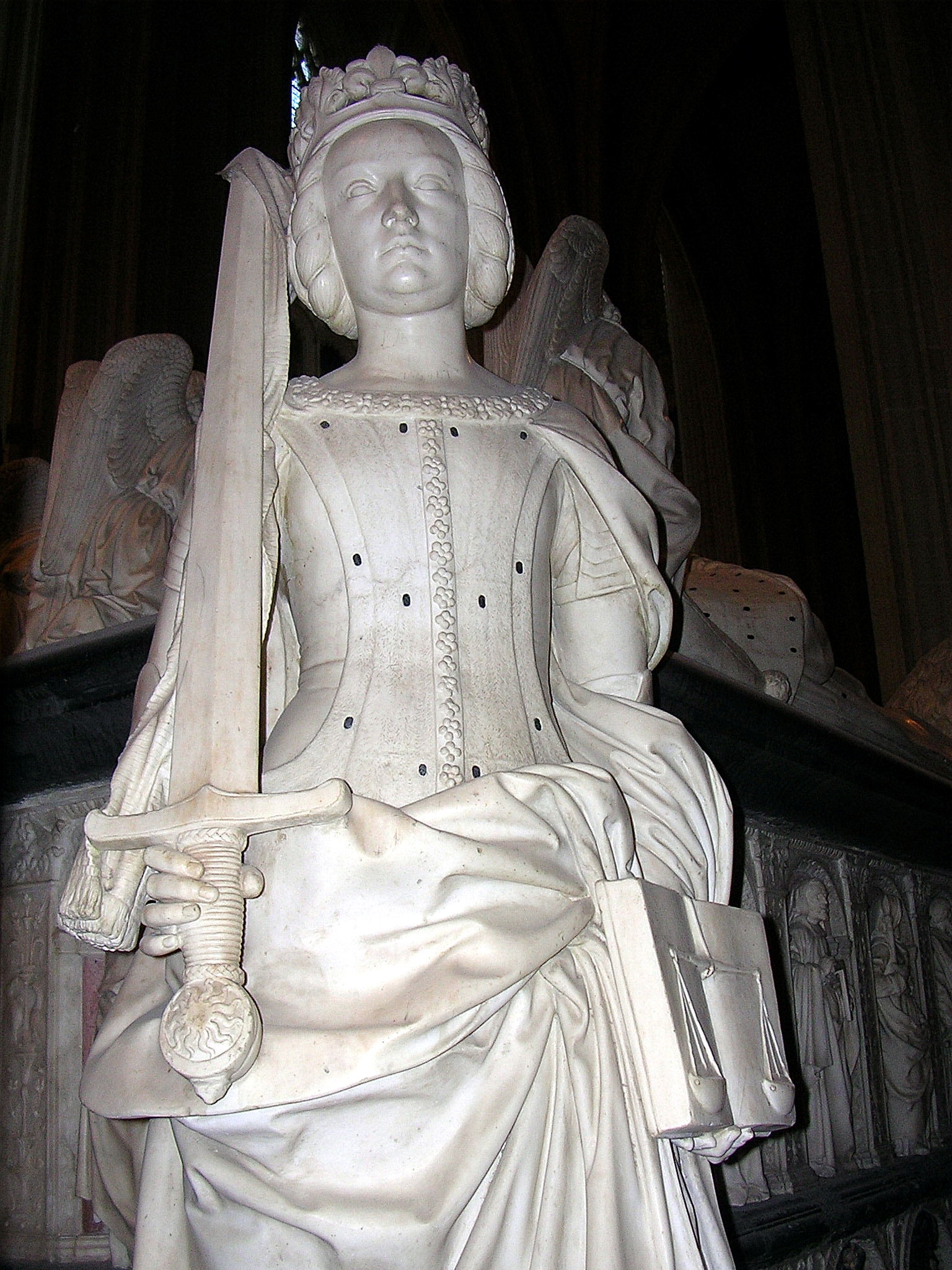
Justice

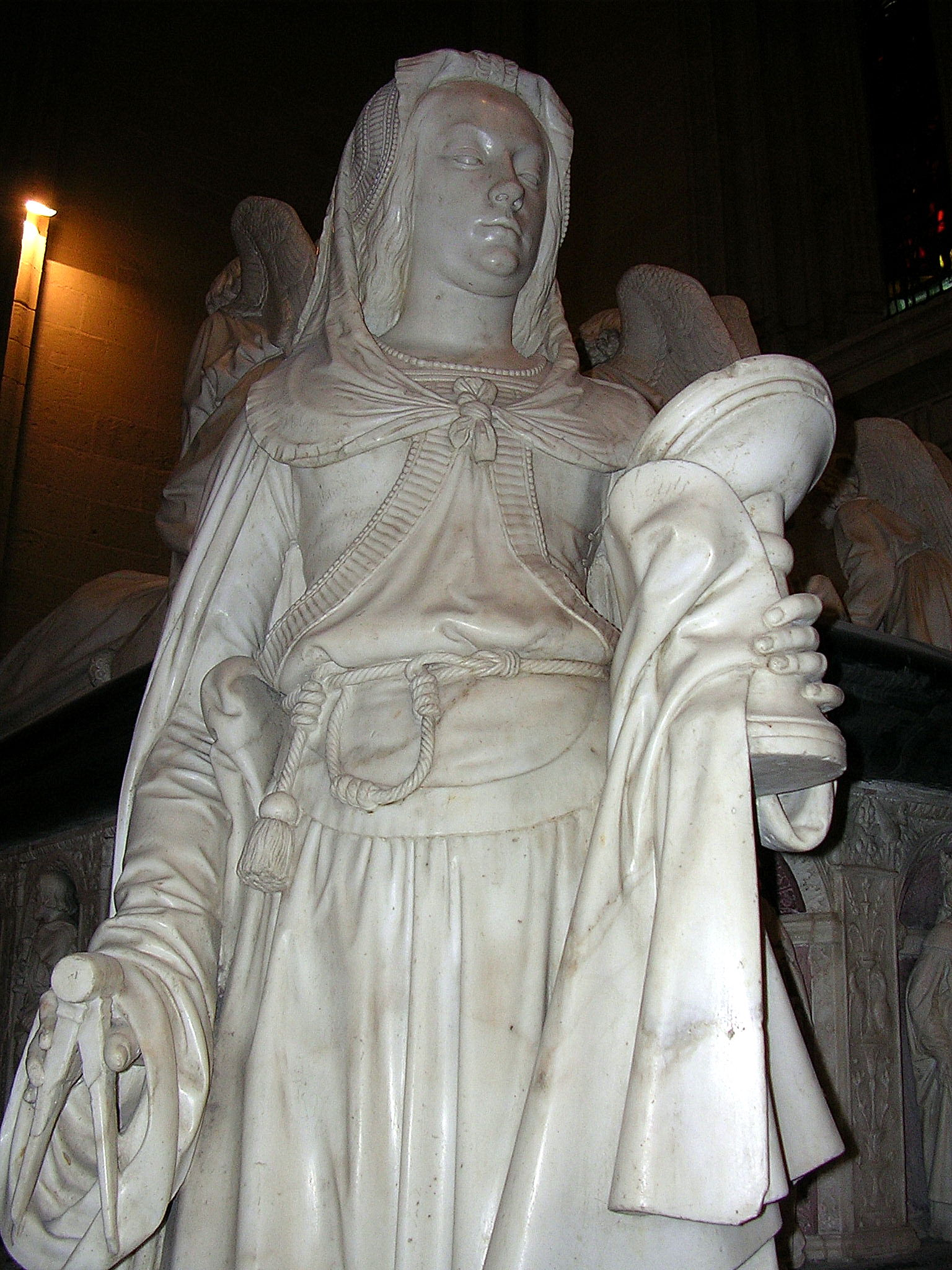
Prudence

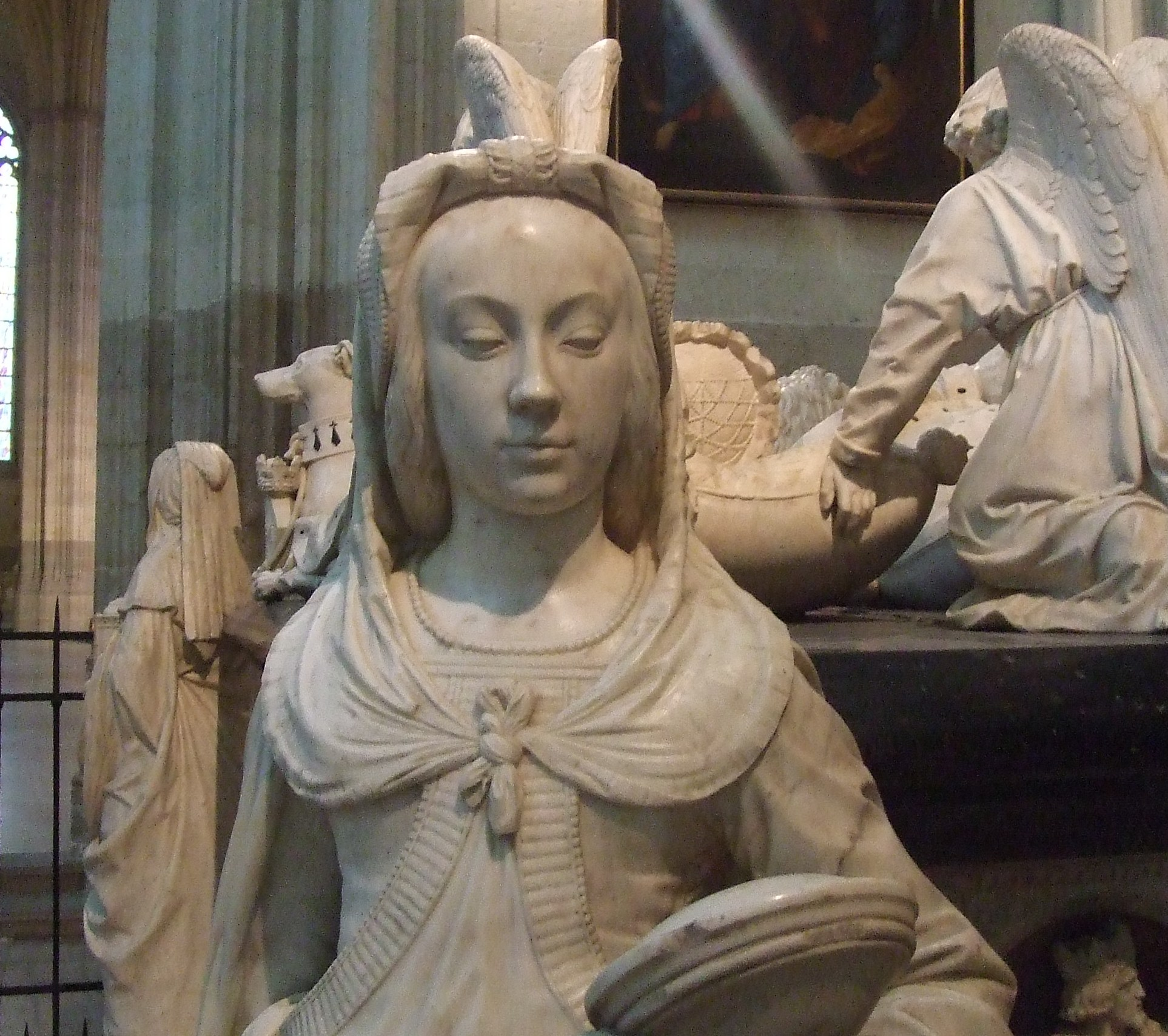
The features of Anne on the figure of Prudence.

- Courage (Fortitude) is represented in armour and helmet as a warrior, because it is a manly virtue, though symbolised by a woman. In the iconography of this virtue, it is often shown leaning against a column or tower. Here it kills the dragon of discord in the tower. The tower is damaged by the dragon, but stands, thus symbolizing the triumph of fortitude over vice and disorder. The expression on her face reflects some pain, as if the effort to remove the dragon (evil) from the tower (the Good, the conscience) was not achieved without internal struggle. She recalls the role of the Christian knight in defense of the faith.
- Temperance is equipped in her right hand with a horse's bridle, symbol of the control of animal energy by reason: there is a time for everything (Ec from 3.1 to 15). Her left hand holds a clock, a symbol of the changing times and seasons one must learn to respect by managing ones passions. It also symbolizes that time must not be wasted on vanity; measure everything to avoid excess. She stands for the fact that the prince must achieve balance. Her almost monastic garb expresses the rejection of the temptations of the flesh that lead to excess.
- Justice has a book in her left hand, representing the Law, illustrated with a balance, representing fairness. In her left hand she holds a sword, imposing but delicately covered with a piece of her scarf; "Deliver justice, but do not destroy the person". The sword punishes, but the balance weighs the gravity of the crime or the weight of the arguments of both parties. The statue wears a crown, recalling that the prince has the role of judge and arbitrator.
- Prudence holds in her right hand a compass, a symbol of the extent of any action, and in her left hand a mirror, reflecting every thought back to be contemplated and assessed before the wisdom of the ages. The figure has two faces. At the back is an old man implying the wisdom of the past. At the front is the young woman looking to the future. The mirror is also that of truth: she sees the image of the prince's weaknesses and, knowing herself, can better correct his conduct. At her feet is a snake: "Be wise as serpents" (Matthew 10:16). The figure of Prudence is a portrait of Anne of Brittany, of whom a contemporary poet said Prudence was her chief virtue.

== Details ==
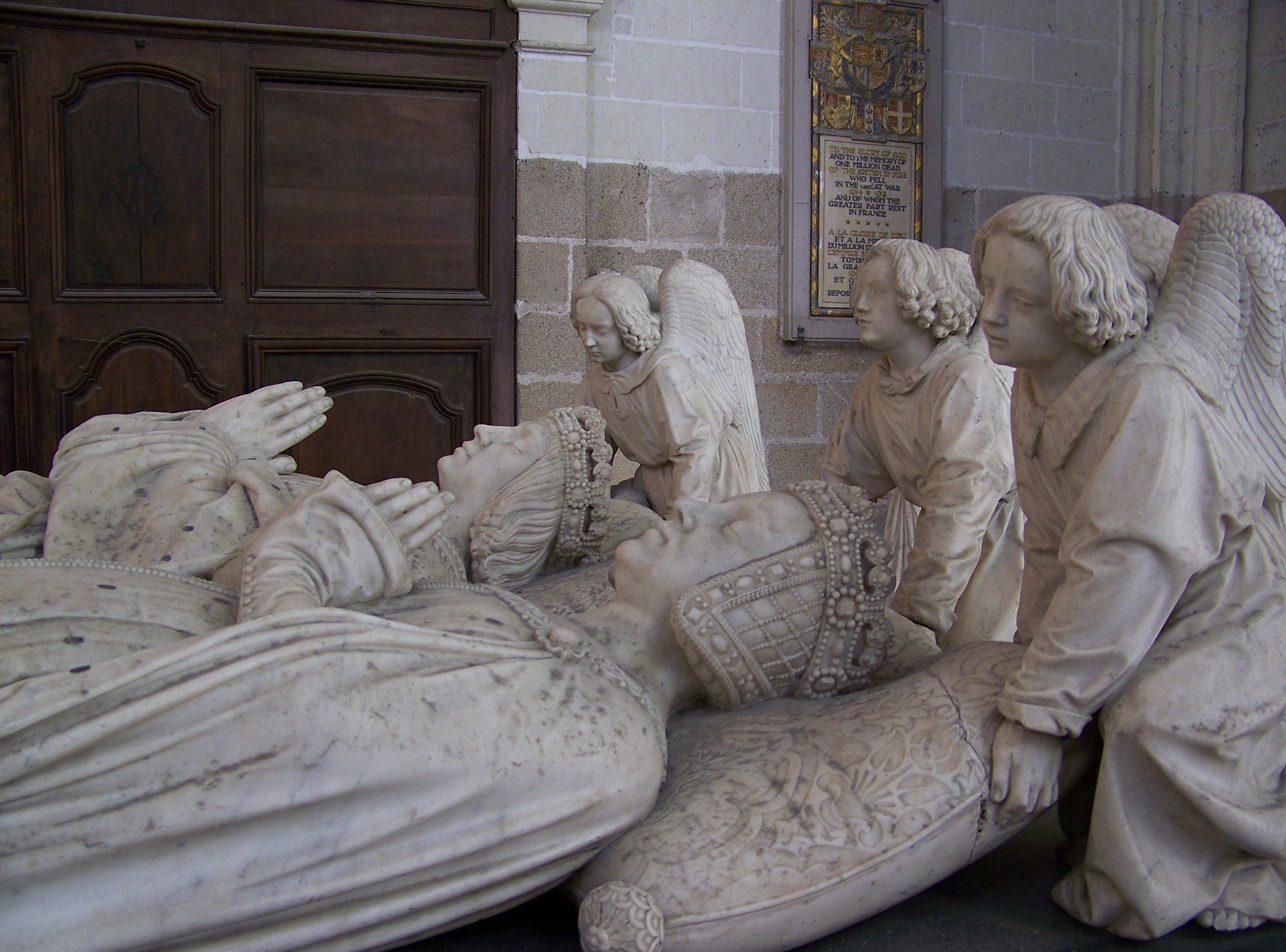
The portraits of the deceased, Francis and Margaret, on the tomb, their heads supported on pillows by angels

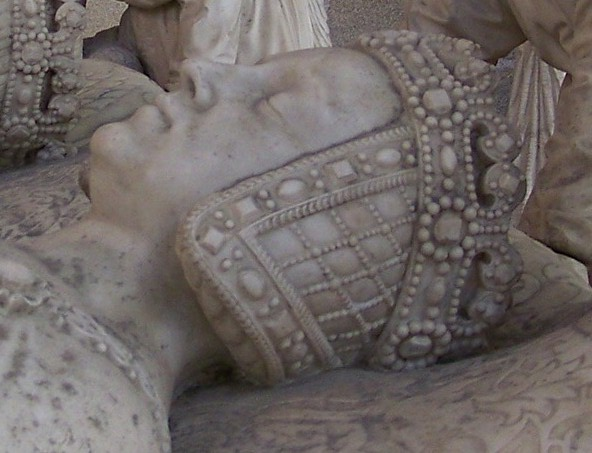
Portrait of Margaret of Foix

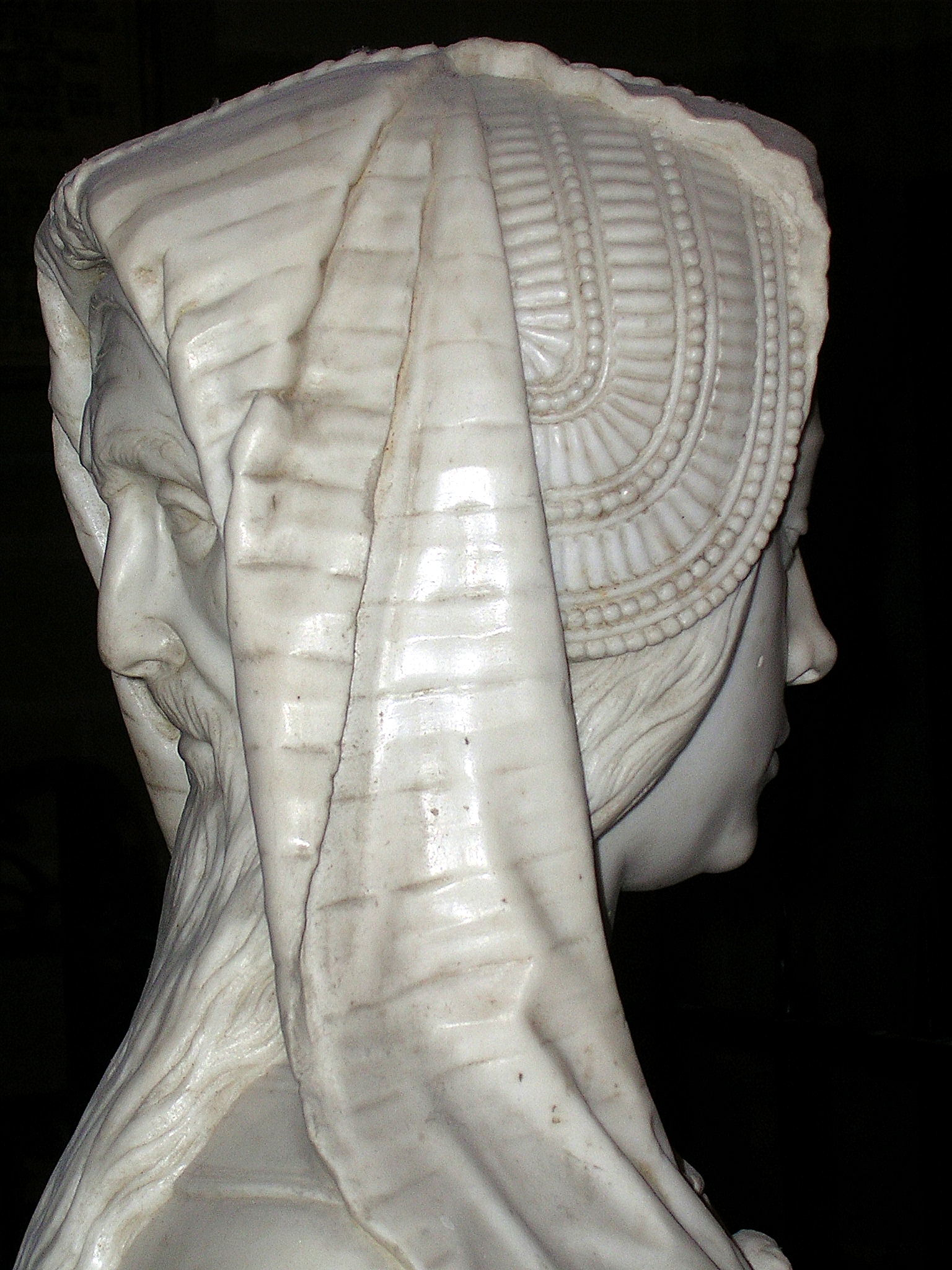
The two faces of Prudence

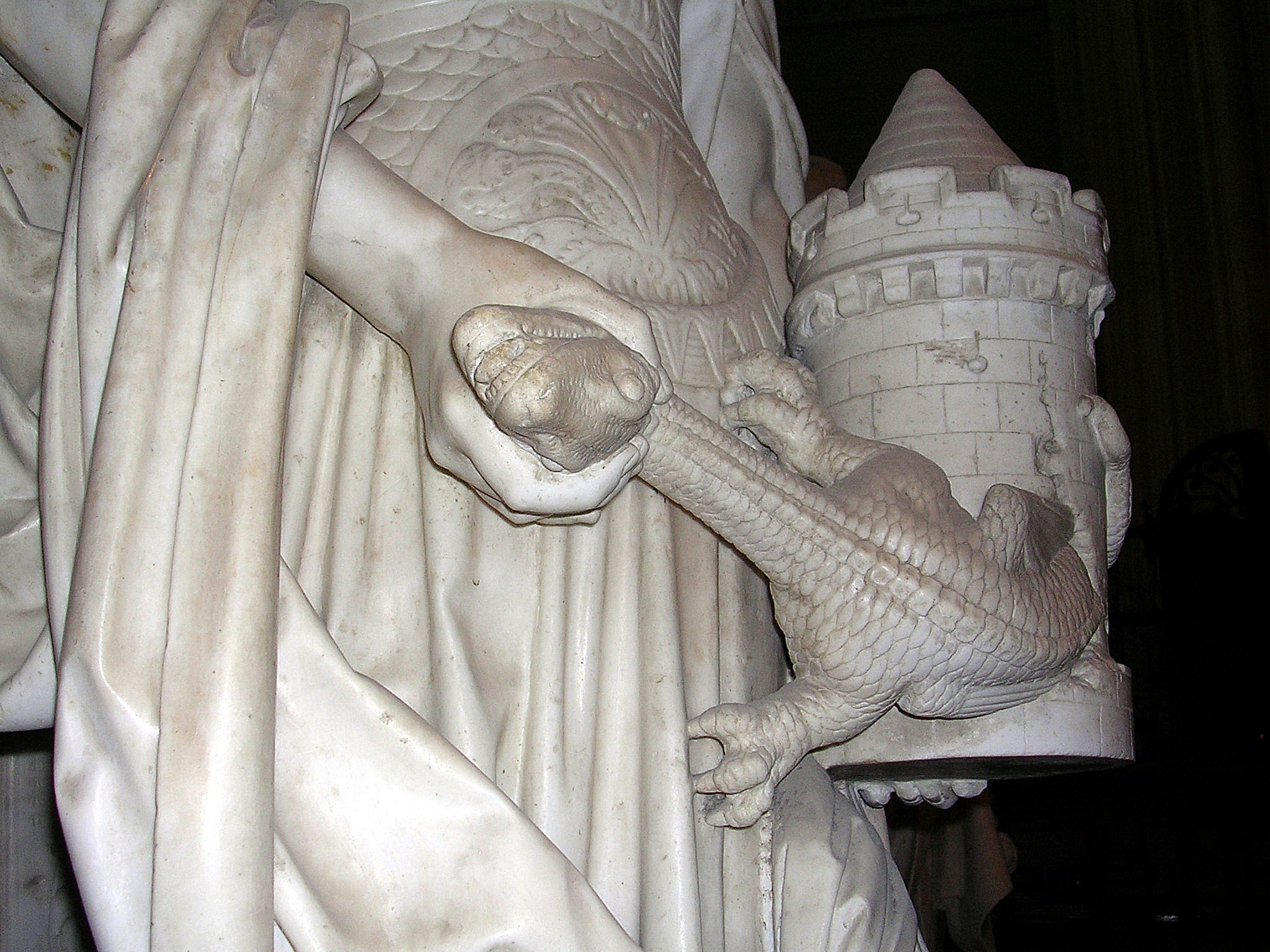
The dragon expelled from the castle

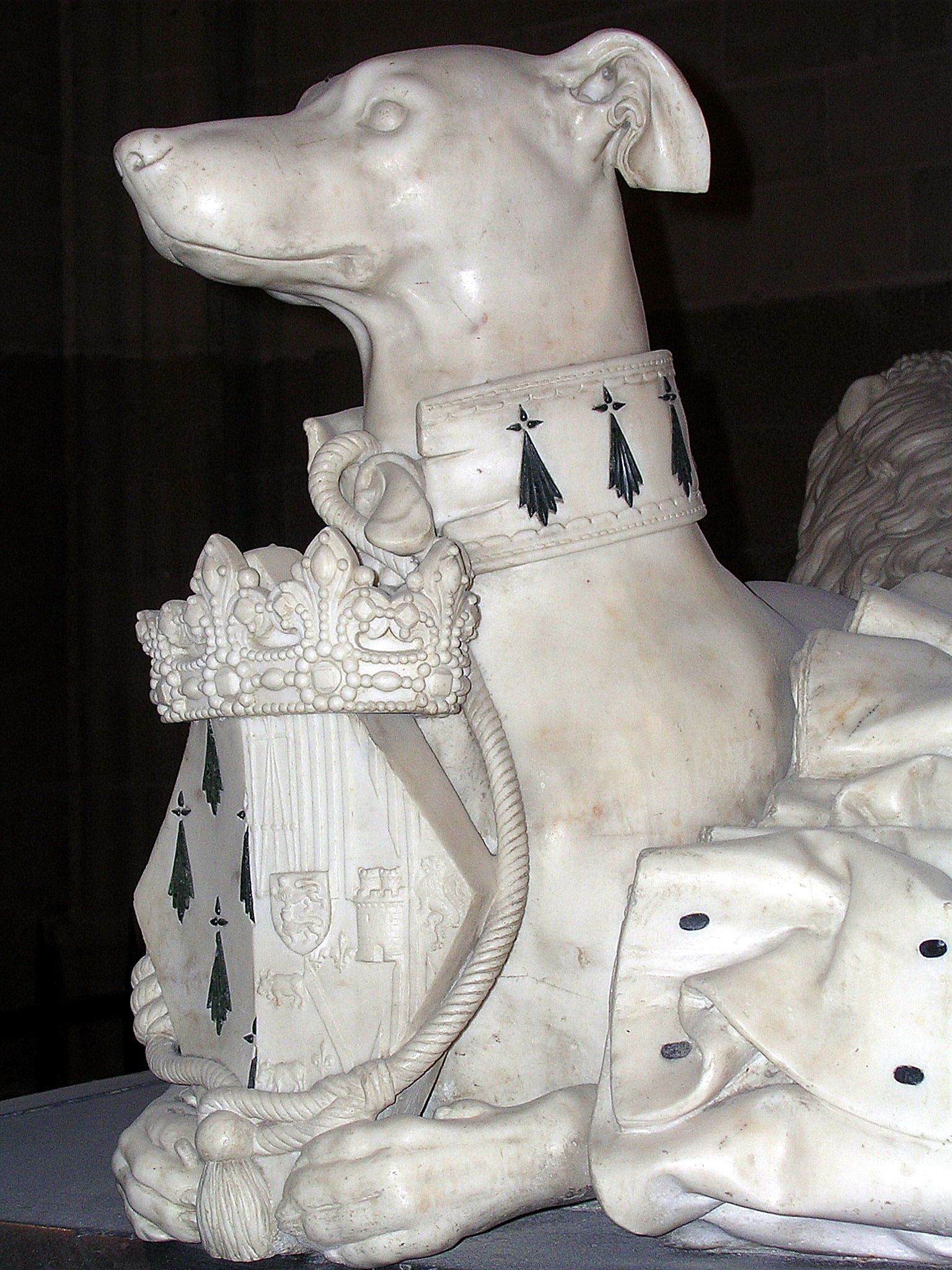
The greyhound, symbolising fidelity

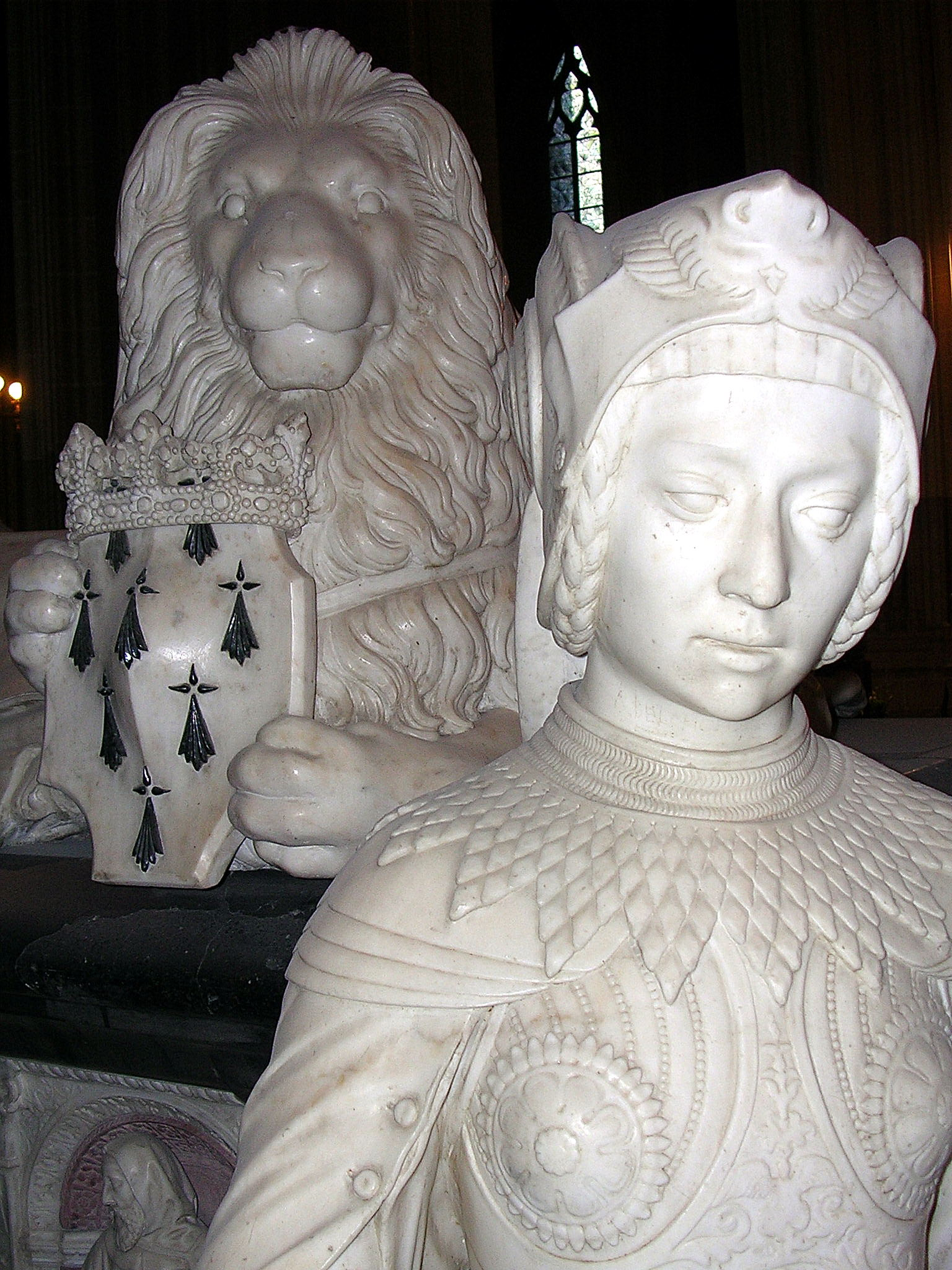
the Lion, symbolising strength, with the ermine escutcheon of Brittany

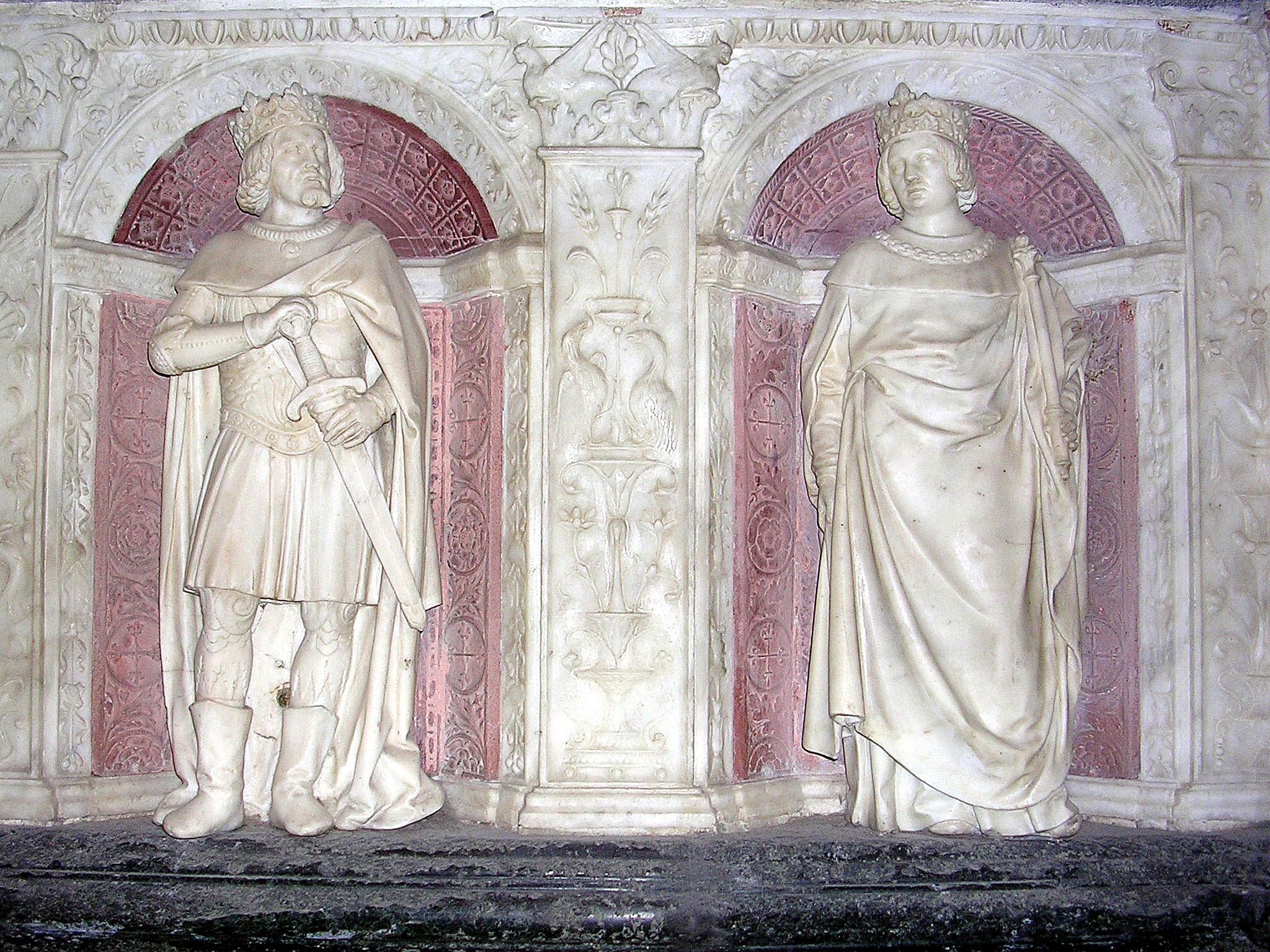
Charlemagne and Saint Louis

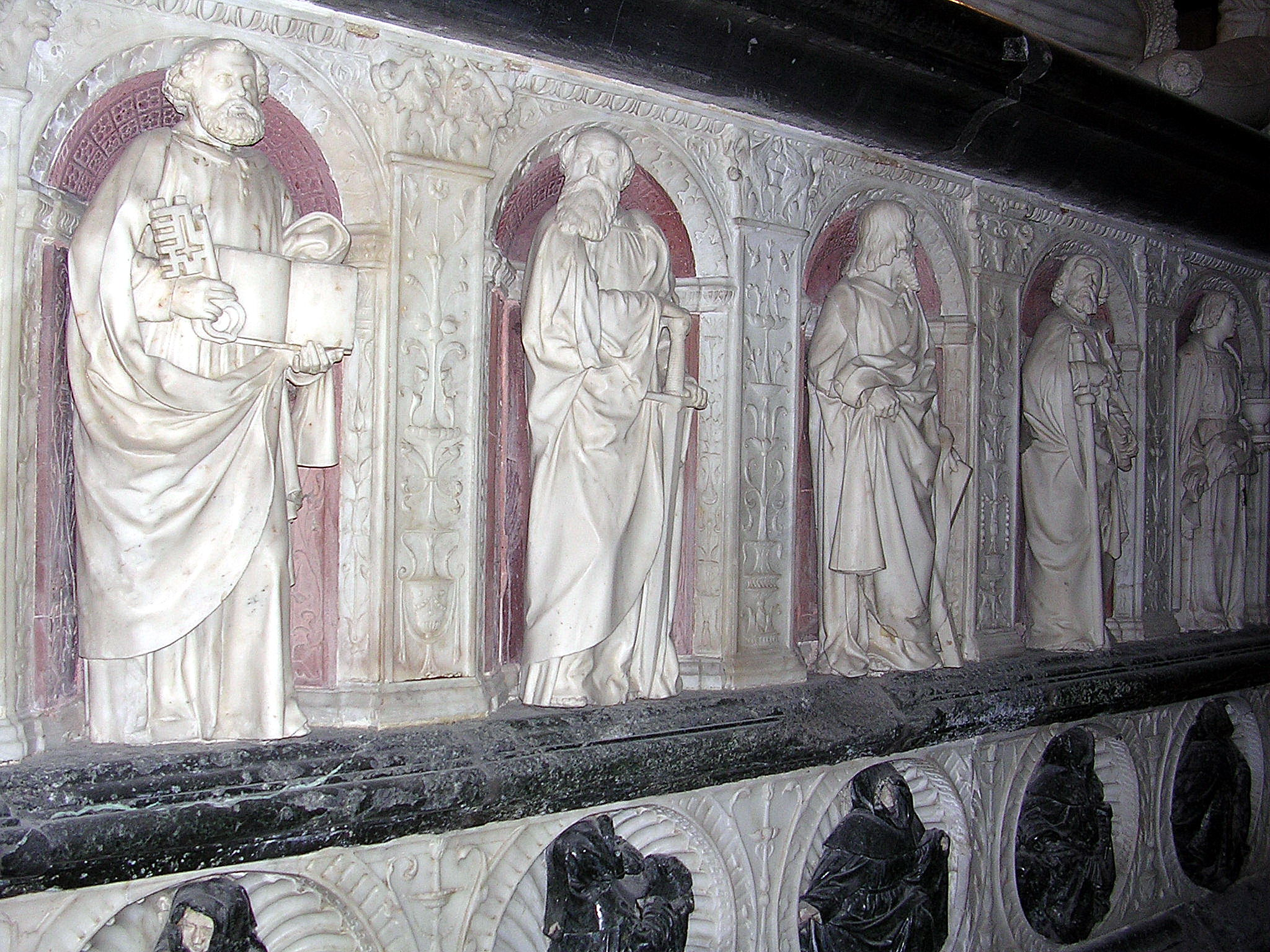
The Apostles and (below) Penitents

== See also ==
- Anne of Brittany's heart jewel case

== Sources ==
- Panofsky, Erwin. Tomb Sculpture: Its Changing Aspects from Ancient Egypt to Bernini. London: Harry Abrams, 1964
- Porras, Stephanie. Art of the Northern Renaissance: Courts, Commerce and Devotion. London: Laurence King Publishing, 2018. ISBN 978-1-7862-7165-5
