= Michel Colombe =

French sculptor

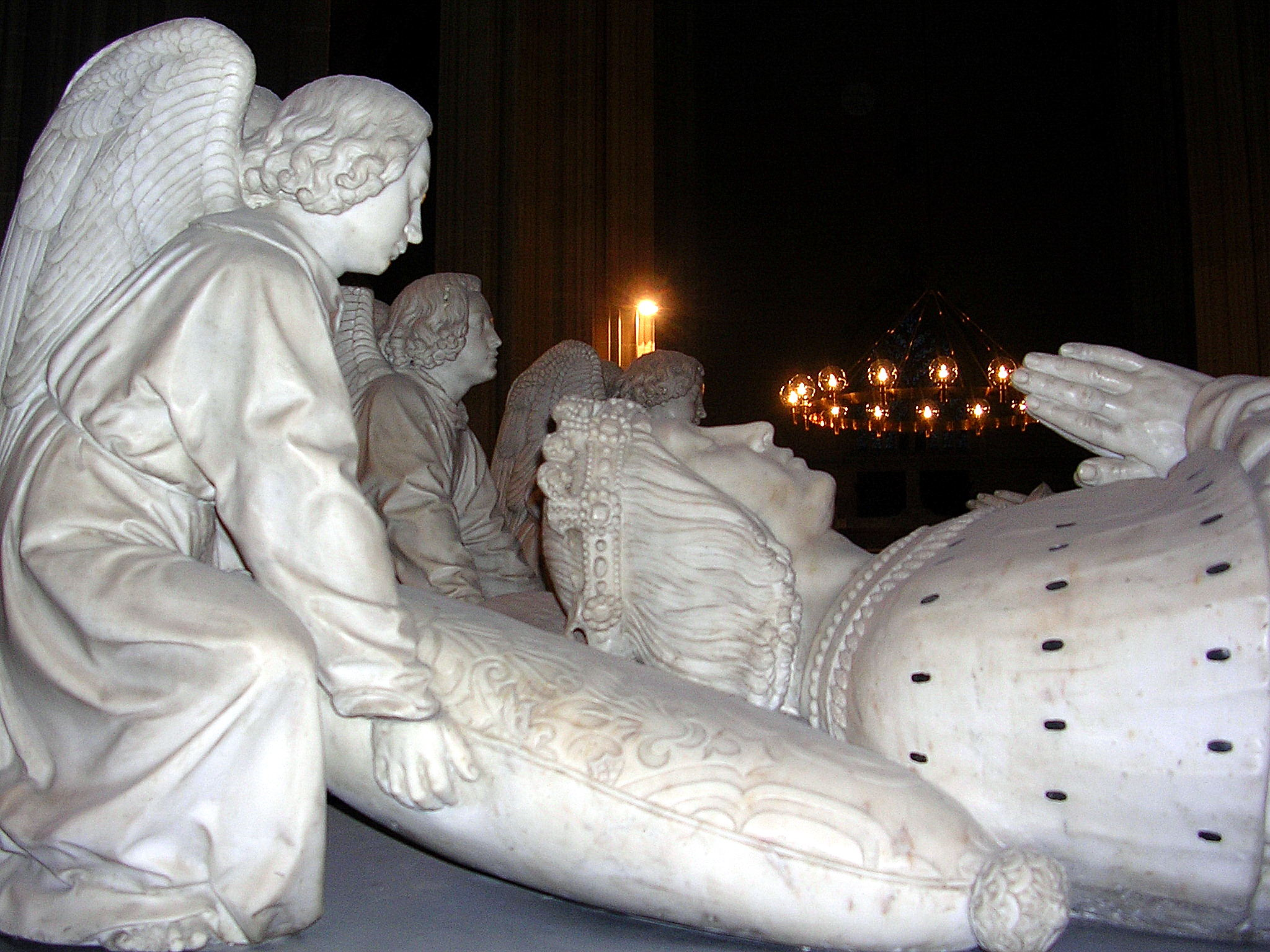
Monument to Francis II of Brittany

Michel Colombe (c. 1430 – c. 1513) was a French sculptor whose work bridged the late Gothic and Renaissance styles.

Born in Bourges into a family of artisans, he was active in Tours. Colombe's surviving works all date from his old age. He created the gisant figures of the two deceased children of Charles VIII of France on their monument (1506) in Tours Cathedral. However, his most important surviving works were for the magnificent tomb of Francis II, Duke of Brittany, in Nantes Cathedral (1502–1507), and for the mausoleum of Philibert II of Savoy, at Notre-Dame de Brou, his masterwork.

The Francis II monument was designed by Jean Perréal; it was disassembled and buried for safekeeping during the French Revolution. A sculpture depicting the Entombment of Christ at the Abbey of Solesmes (1494–1498) is attributed to him. A bas-relief commissioned in 1508 by Georges d'Amboise for the Château de Gaillon is conserved in the Musée du Louvre. His brother Jean Colombe was an important miniature painter and illuminator who worked on the Très Riches Heures du Duc de Berry. His nephew Guillaume Regnault appears to have trained in his atelier.

== Gallery ==
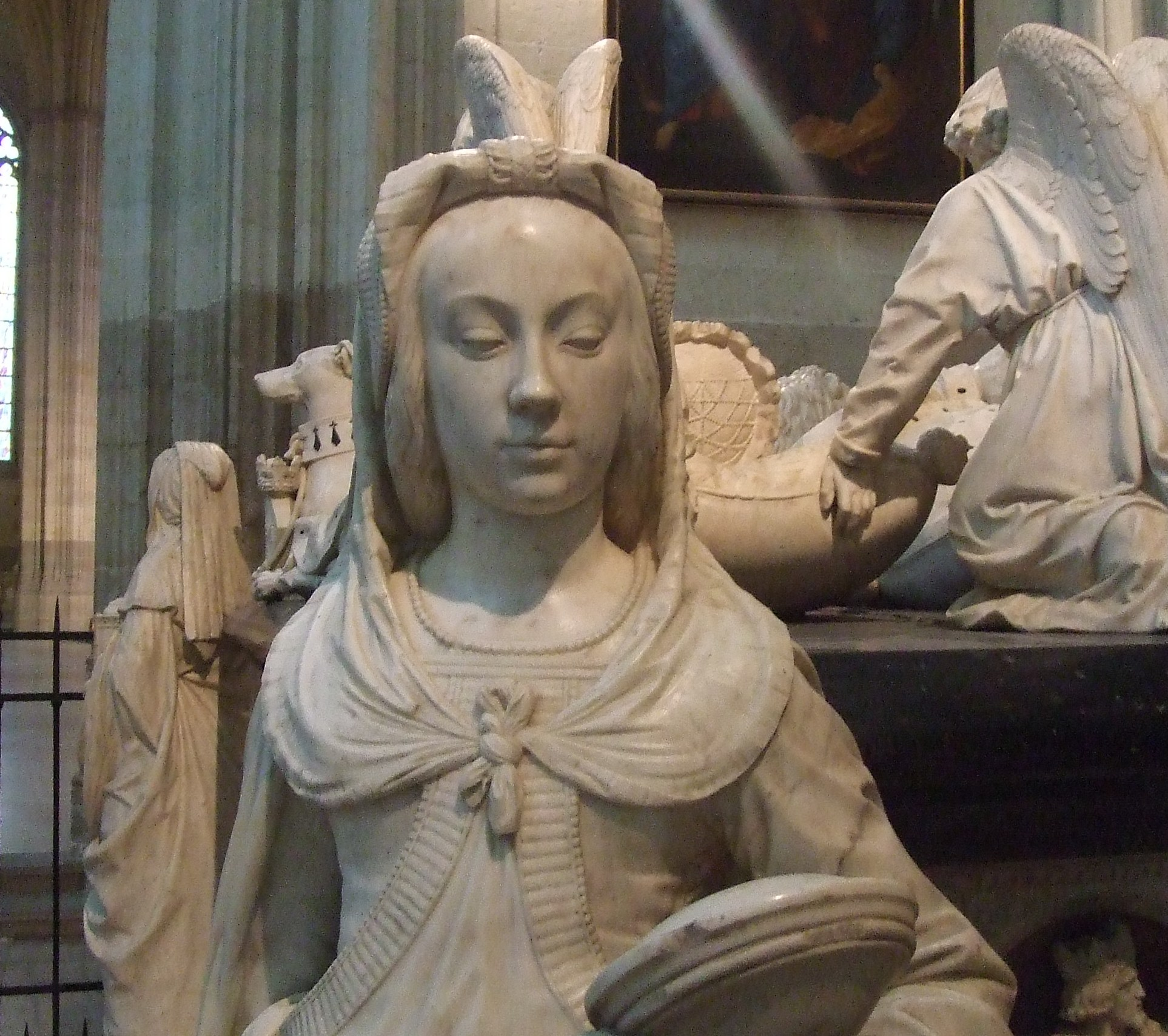
Allegory of Prudence on the tomb of Francis, with the features of Francis's daughter Anne of Brittany

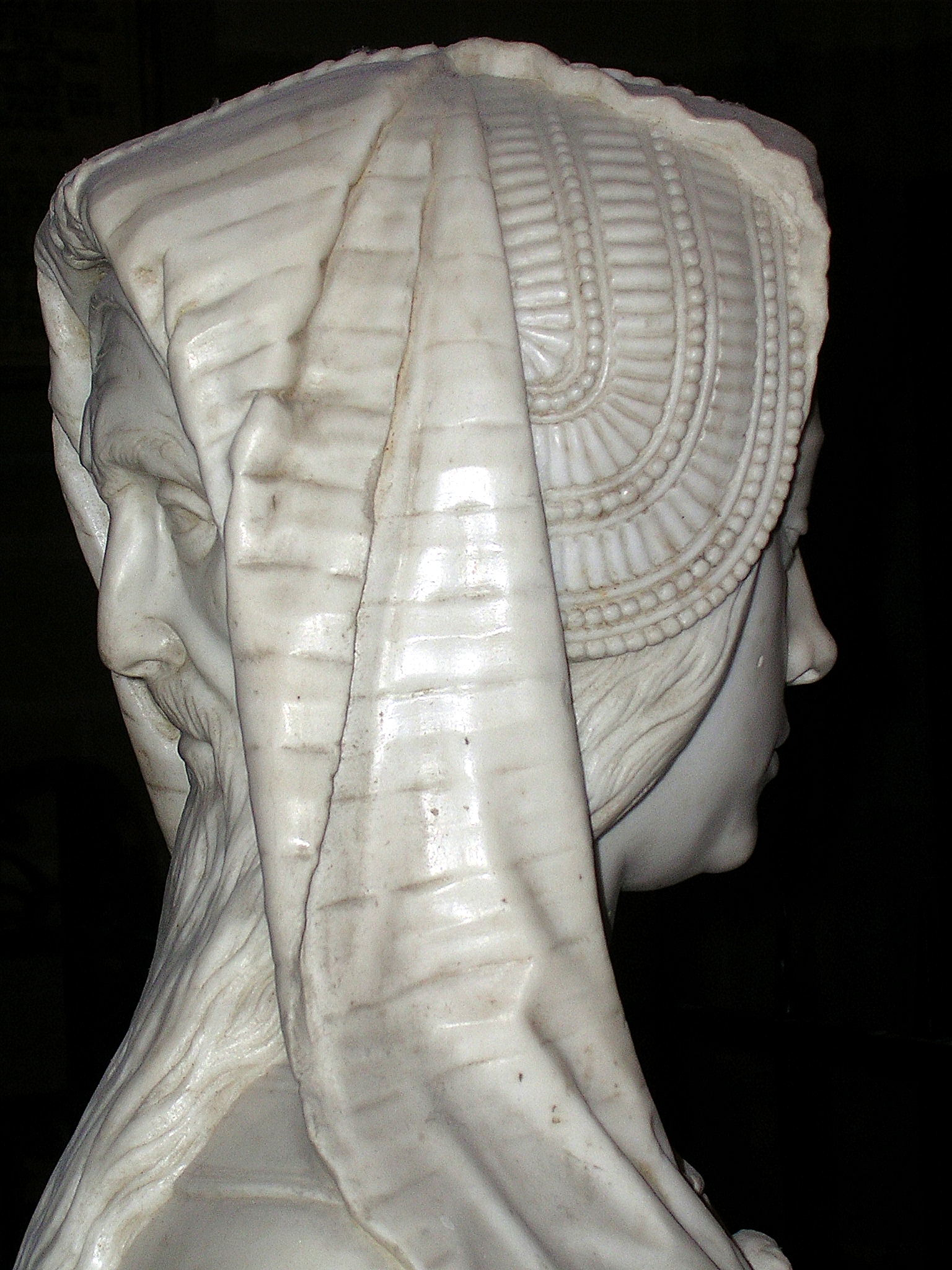
Side view of Prudence

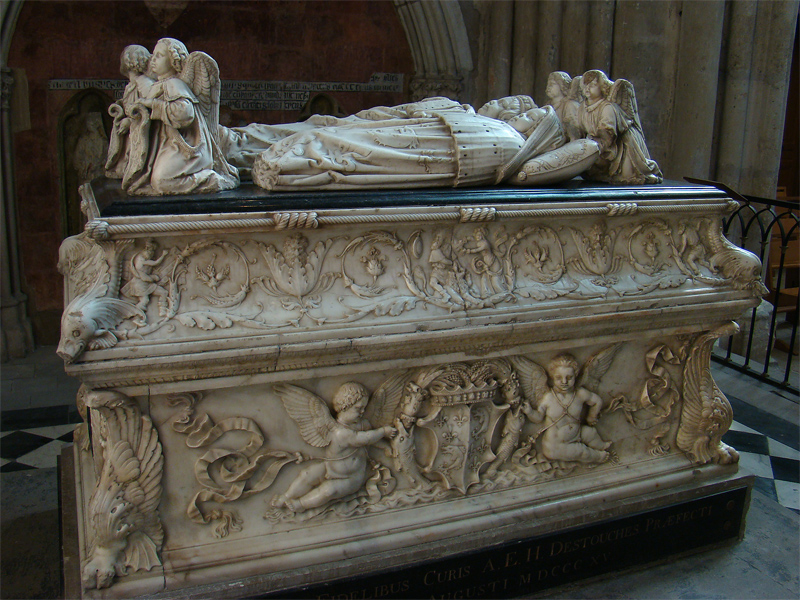
Fully Renaissance monument to the children of Charles VIII, 1506, Saint-Gatien, Tours

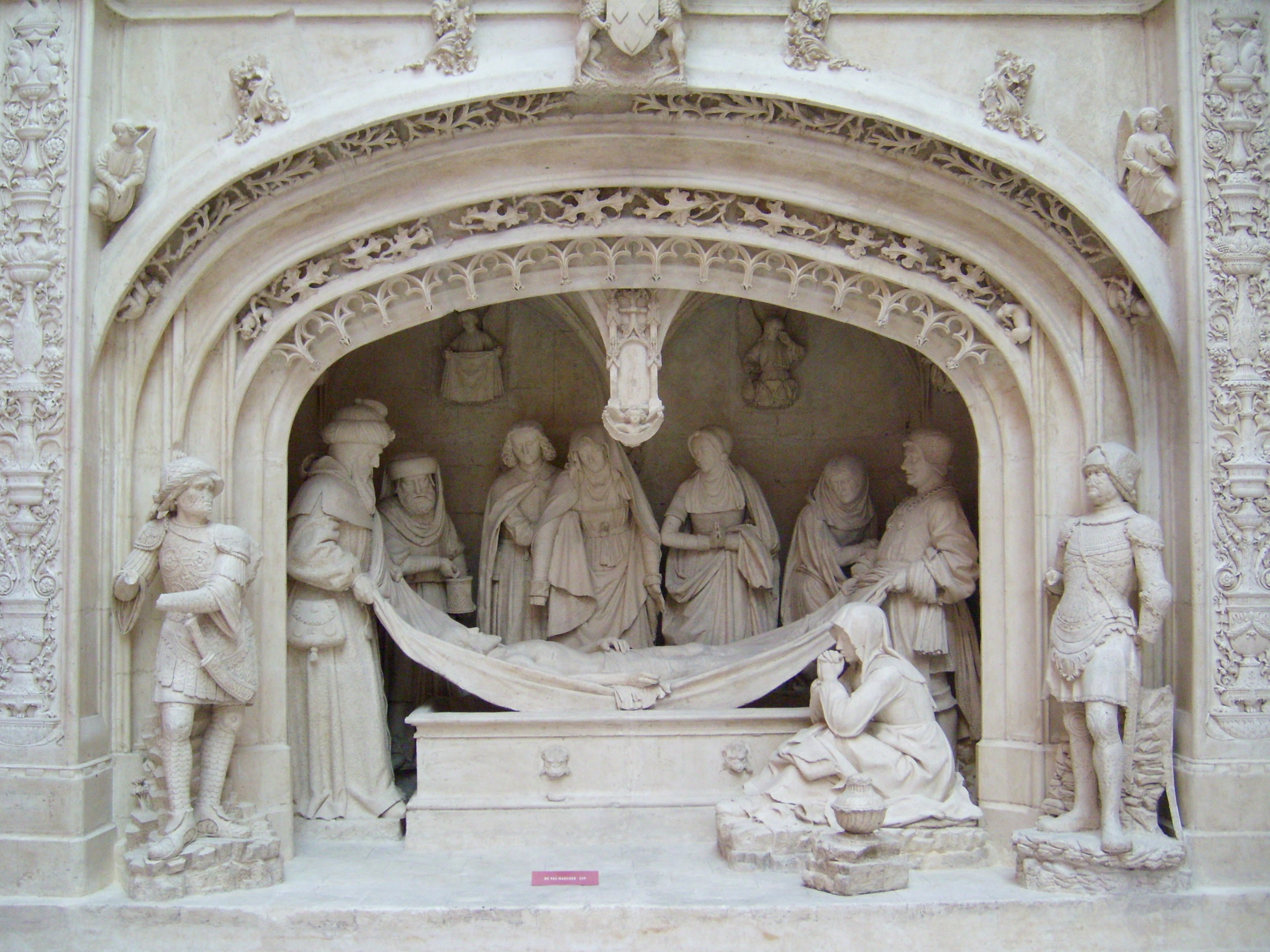
Entombment of Christ, Solesmes

== Bibliography ==
- Bazin, Germain (1968). The History of World Sculpture. n.p.: Lamplight. OCLC 1474245
- (in French) (Nantes Cathedral) Le tombeau de François II
