= Jean Perréal =

French painter (c. 1455 – c. 1530)

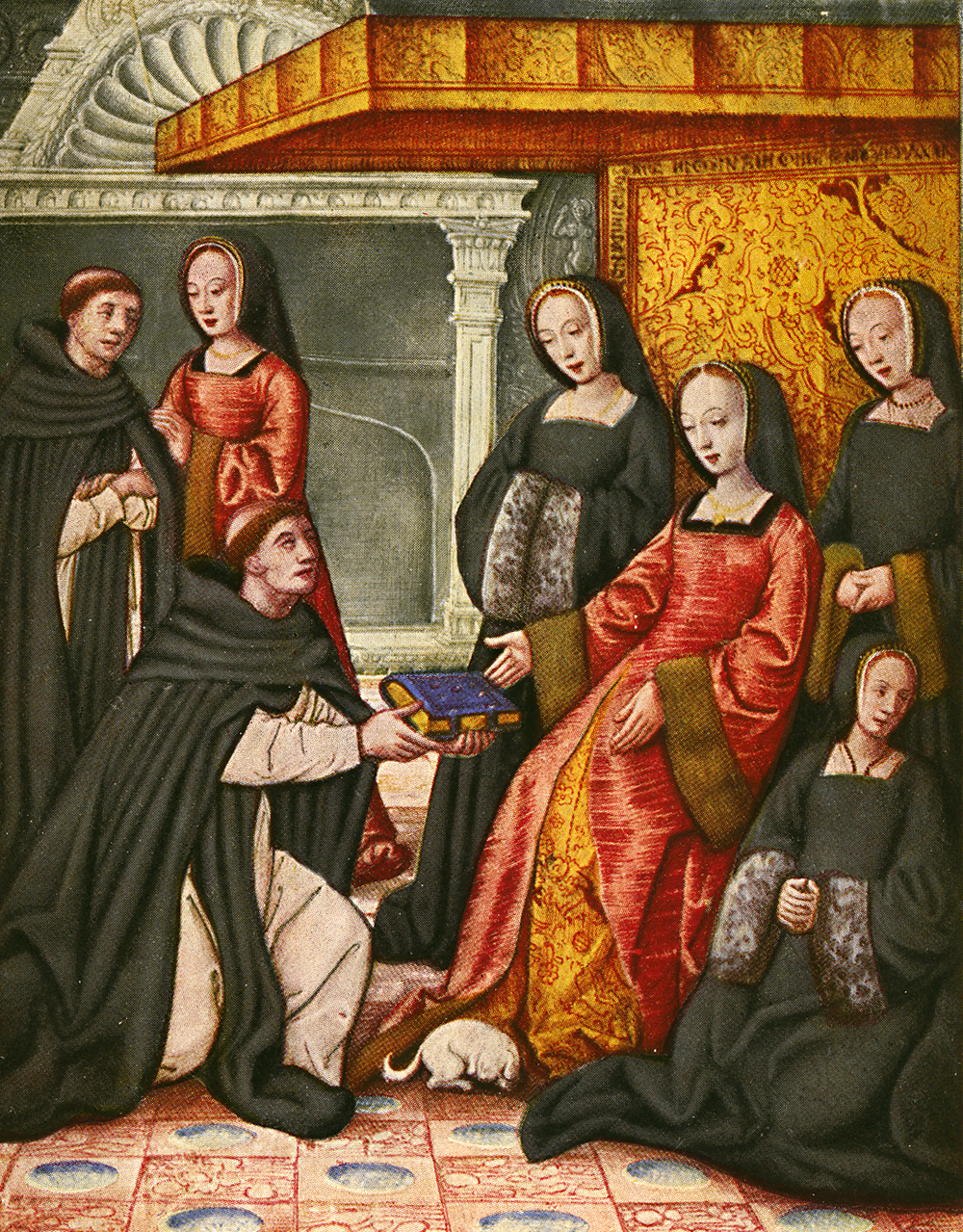
Anne of Brittany, receives a book in praise of famous women, painted by Jean Perréal.

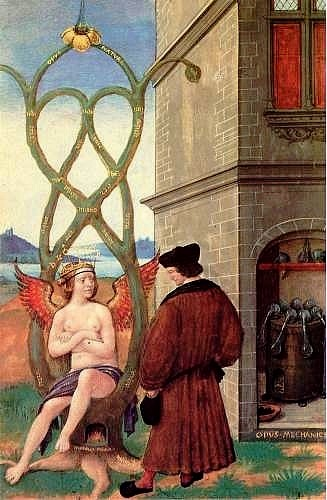
Complainte de la Nature, 1516

Jean Perréal (French pronunciation: [ʒɑ̃ pɛʁeal]; c. 1455 – c. 1530), sometimes called Peréal, Johannes Parisienus or Jean De Paris, was a successful portraitist for French royalty in the first half of the 16th century, as well as an architect, sculptor and limner of illuminated manuscripts. He was active mostly in France and in Italy and London as well.

Perréal's major patrons were Charles of Bourbon, King Charles VIII, Louis XII and Francis I, all of France. It is mentioned that in honor of Charles of Bourbon he painted escutcheons for the entry of the nobleman to the city of Lyon, but the date of Charles' birth, 1489, and the time of the artist's residence in Lyons do not coincide accurately. His most remarkable works are often considered to be a portrait of Charles VIII (Musée Condé) and a miniature piece, Pierre Sala, an image of a poet who, like Perréal, was a royal valet de chambre. A letter from Perréal to Margaret of Austria c. 1511 survives describing the relative merits of marble and alabaster, signed 'Jehan Perreal de Paris, votre Valet de Chambre et paintre indigne.'

He was an accomplished designer of tombs, medals, theater scenery and ceremonies, including the marriage of King Louis XII and his second wife Mary Tudor. For the marriage, Perréal was sent to London in 1514, where he also executed a portrait of Mary Tudor. Working in a glazed paint pigment on glass, he also crafted a unique portrait of Louis XII, entitled Louis XII of France in Prayer (Walters Art Museum). As a sculptural designer, Perréal sketched the design for the tomb of Francis II, Duke of Brittany, which was executed by the French sculptor Michel Colombe, and is now in the cathedral of Nantes.

In 1516, he painted an allegorical image, la complainte de nature à l'alchimiste errant (The Lament of Nature to the Wandering Alchemist), in which a winged figure with arms crossed, representing Nature, sits on a tree stump with branches that have been intricately shaped, with a fire burning in its base, conversing with an alchemist in an ankle-length coat, standing outside of his stone-laid shoreline laboratory. Live resprouting shoots emerge from either side of the tree stump seat to form a fancifully twined and grafted two-story-tall chair back with Latin inscription translated as earth, air, fire, water, mixture, (at the top of the tree) works of nature, (at the bottom of the alchemist building) works of man.

His style is noted as keeping to the elegant French tradition, as well as a touch of Flemish realism.

== Selected works ==
- Media related to Jehan Perréal at Wikimedia Commons
- 1498 - Portrait of Charles VIII, Oil, (Musée Condé, Chantilly)
- 1516 - The Lament of Nature to the Wandering Alchemist (la complainte de nature à l'alchimiste errant), miniature, (Musée Marmottan Monet, Paris)
- 1520 - Portrait of Mary Tudor, Oil on panel, (National Portrait Gallery, London)
