= Vallery =

- Commune
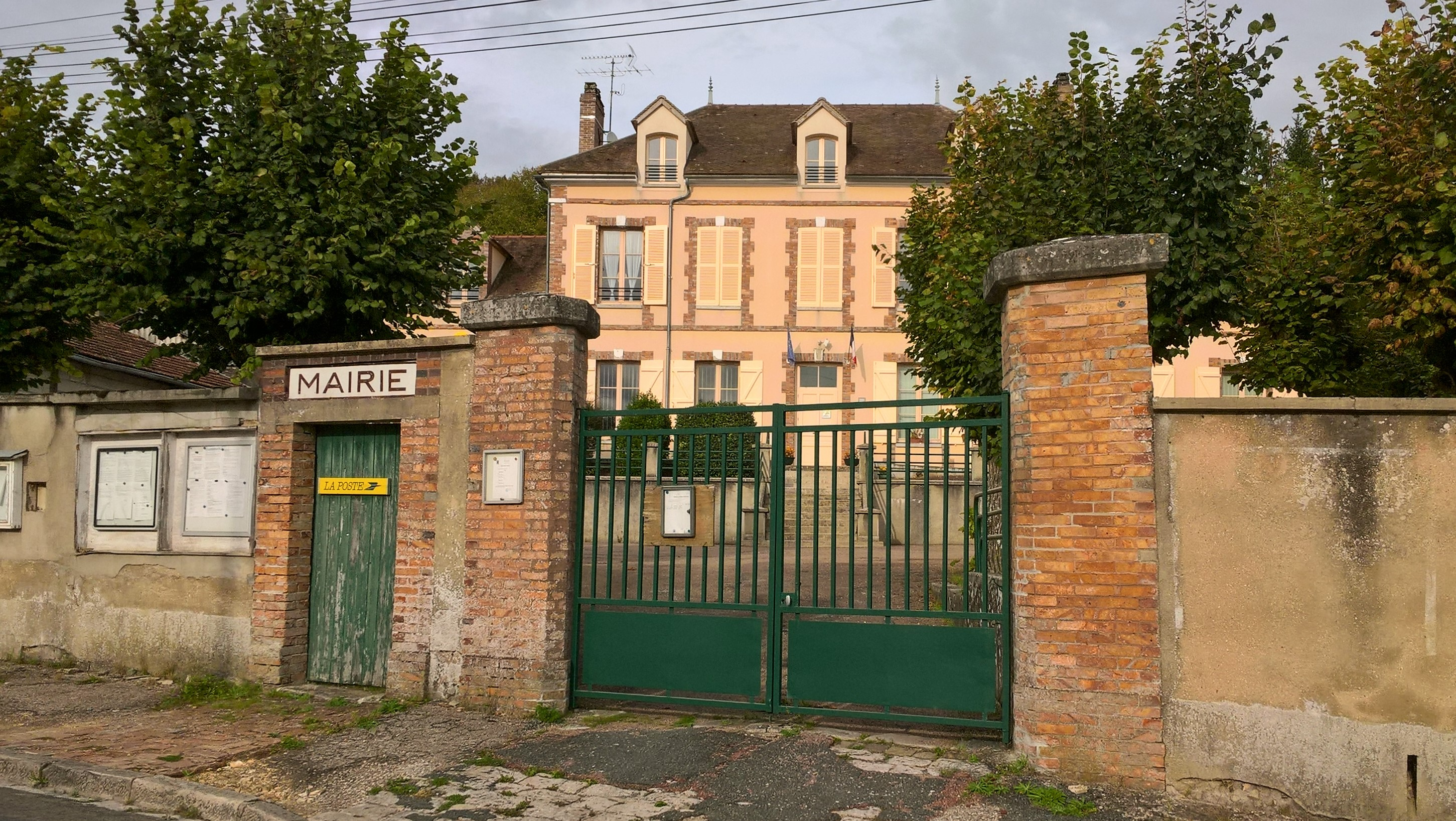
- The town hall in Vallery

- Coat of arms
- Location of Vallery
- Location within France Location within Bourgogne-Franche-Comté
- Coordinates: 48°14′30″N 3°02′52″E
- Country: France
- Region: Bourgogne-Franche-Comté
- Department: Yonne
- Arrondissement: Sens
- Canton: Gâtinais en Bourgogne
- Area^{1}: 12.43 km^{2} (4.80 sq mi)
- Highest elevation: 164 m (538 ft)
- Lowest elevation: 109 m (358 ft)
- Population (2023): 575
  - Density: 46.3/km^{2} (120/sq mi)
- Time zone: UTC+01:00 (CET)
  - Summer (DST): UTC+02:00 (CEST)
- INSEE/Postal code: 89428 /89150
- ^{1} French Land Register data, which excludes lakes, ponds, glaciers > 1 km^{2} (0.386 sq mi or 247 acres) and river estuaries.

Vallery (French pronunciation: [valʁi]) is a commune in the Yonne department in Bourgogne-Franche-Comté in north-central France.

== History ==
The town was acquired by Louis de Bourbon, prince de Condé - uncle of the future Henry IV of France. The town thus formed part of the extensive territories that were acquired by the Condé family over the years. Louis's son Henri de Bourbon, stayed at the Château there. The land would stay with the family until 1735 when Mademoiselle de Charolais - descendant of Louis - sold the land.

The town was the traditional burial place of the Princes of Condé and their descendants.

Those buried in the town include:

- Louis de Bourbon, prince de Condé;
- Henri de Bourbon, prince de Condé;
- Henri de Bourbon, prince de Condé;
- Éléonore de Bourbon, comtesse de La Marche;
- Louis de Bourbon, prince de Condé - le Grand Condé;
- Henri Jule de Bourbon, prince de Condé;
- Henri de Bourbon, duc de Bourbon
- Louis de Bourbon, prince de Condé, Monsieur le Duc
- Henri de Bourbon (1672–1675), comte de Clermont;
- Louis Henri de Bourbon, comte de La Marche;
- Mademoiselle de Clermont (1679–1680)
- Louis Armand de Bourbon, prince de Conti

== See also ==
- Communes of the Yonne department
