= Charlotte Catherine de La Trémoille =

Charlotte Catherine
- Princess of Condé
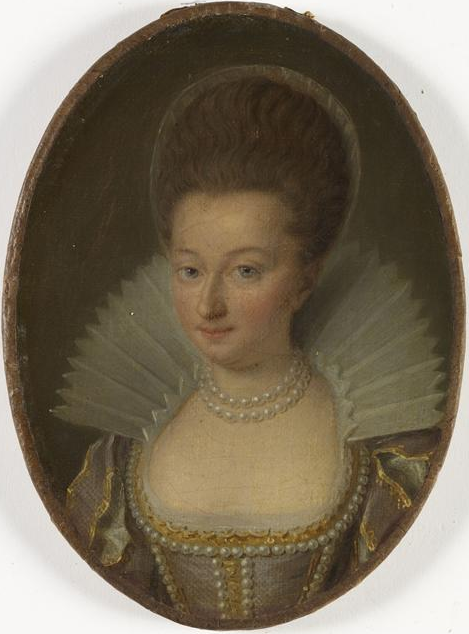
- Born: 1568; France
- Died: 29 August 1629 (aged 60–61); Paris, France
- Burial: Église du monastère Sainte-Claire de l'Ave Maria, Paris, France
- Spouse: Henri I, Prince of Condé
- Issue Detail: Éléonore, Princess of Orange; Henri II, Prince of Condé
Names
- Charlotte Catherine de La Trémoïlle
- House: La Trémoille
- Father: Louis III de La Trémoille, Duke of Thouars
- Mother: Jeanne de Montmorency

Charlotte Catherine de La Trémoïlle (1568 – 29 August 1629) was a French noblewoman and, by marriage, Princess of Condé. By birth she belonged to the House of La Trémoïlle.

== Biography ==
Charlotte Catherine was the youngest of five children born to Louis III de La Trémoille and Jeanne de Montmorency, Duke and Duchess of Thouars, members of two of France's oldest and most powerful families. Her father's family, the La Trémoïlles, held the rank of prince étranger at the French court, and her father was a loyalist of the House of Valois. Her maternal grandfather, Anne de Montmorency, Duke of Montmorency, had been taken captive with King Francis I of France, at the Battle of Pavia in February 1525.

She was married at between 17 and 18 years of age, on 16 March 1586 in the chateau de Taillebourg, after converting from Roman Catholicism to Protestantism. Her husband, Henri de Bourbon, Prince de Condé, son of the late Louis de Bourbon, Prince de Condé and Eléanor de Roucy de Roye, was one of the most important men in the kingdom, both as military leader of the Huguenots and, after his cousin obtained the French throne as Henry IV, ranked as heir presumptive and premier prince du sang. The couple took up residence at a home of Condé's in Saint-Jean-d'Angély in southwestern France.

As part of her dowry of 20,000 écus d'or and 4 000 livres in annual allowance, Charlotte Catherine brought numerous properties into the Bourbon family which helped settle the debts of her husband's family.

One year and six weeks after the wedding, Charlotte Catherine gave birth to Éléonore de Bourbon-Condé (1587–1619), who would become the Princess of Orange in 1606 upon marrying the eldest son of William the Silent.

Having been wounded in battle at Coutras in September 1587, Charlotte Catherine's husband was recuperating at Saint-Jean-d'Angély when he died suddenly on 3 March 1588. An autopsy indicated he might have been poisoned and, being about three months pregnant at the time (some said, by her page, Prémilhac de Belcastel) Charlotte Catherine was deemed to have a potential motive and was arrested for murder, as was a Condé household servant by the name of Brillant who was put to death after being tortured. She gave birth in a tower of the castle at Saint-Jean-d'Angély to a son, Henri de Bourbon. Tried and condemned to death, she appealed her judgment to the Parlement de Paris but remained imprisoned under close surveillance.

In 1592 the still childless and Protestant King Henry IV chose to recognise her son as his legitimate, heir presumptive and, as the child's godfather, arranged that he be christened with Huguenot rites but then promptly conducted to Saint-Germain-en-Laye Abbey to be raised as a Catholic, despite the House of Condé's Calvinism. Young Henri remained heir presumptive after the king's conversion to Catholicism in 1593 and until the birth of his son, the future Louis XIII, in 1601.

After six years imprisonment Charlotte Catherine was released and, in August 1595, vindicated by the Parlement. In 1596 she abjured Calvinism, once again becoming a Catholic, and was allowed to take up residence in Paris. There her son, the Prince de Condé, held for the remainder of his life the position of premier prince du sang, a rank henceforth retained by the Condés until claimed by the House of Bourbon-Orléans in the 18th century.

While allowed at court the dowager princess was never very popular and there was still suspicion around her having murdered her husband and being an adulteress despite her acquittal of the charges. She also quarreled with the king's mistress Catherine Henriette de Balzac d'Entragues.

Having brought up an orphaned relative, Jacqueline de Bueil (b. 1588) whom she presented at court in 1604. This young noblewoman caught the king's attention this seemed like she might finally be able to rise above her past and gain a stronger position at court. But instead de Bueil after becoming the king's mistress distanced herself from the princess and proved not at all grateful- and finally tired of the demands of her former foster mother, she had the king to banish the dowager princess from appearing at court or - anywhere in sight of the king and queen.

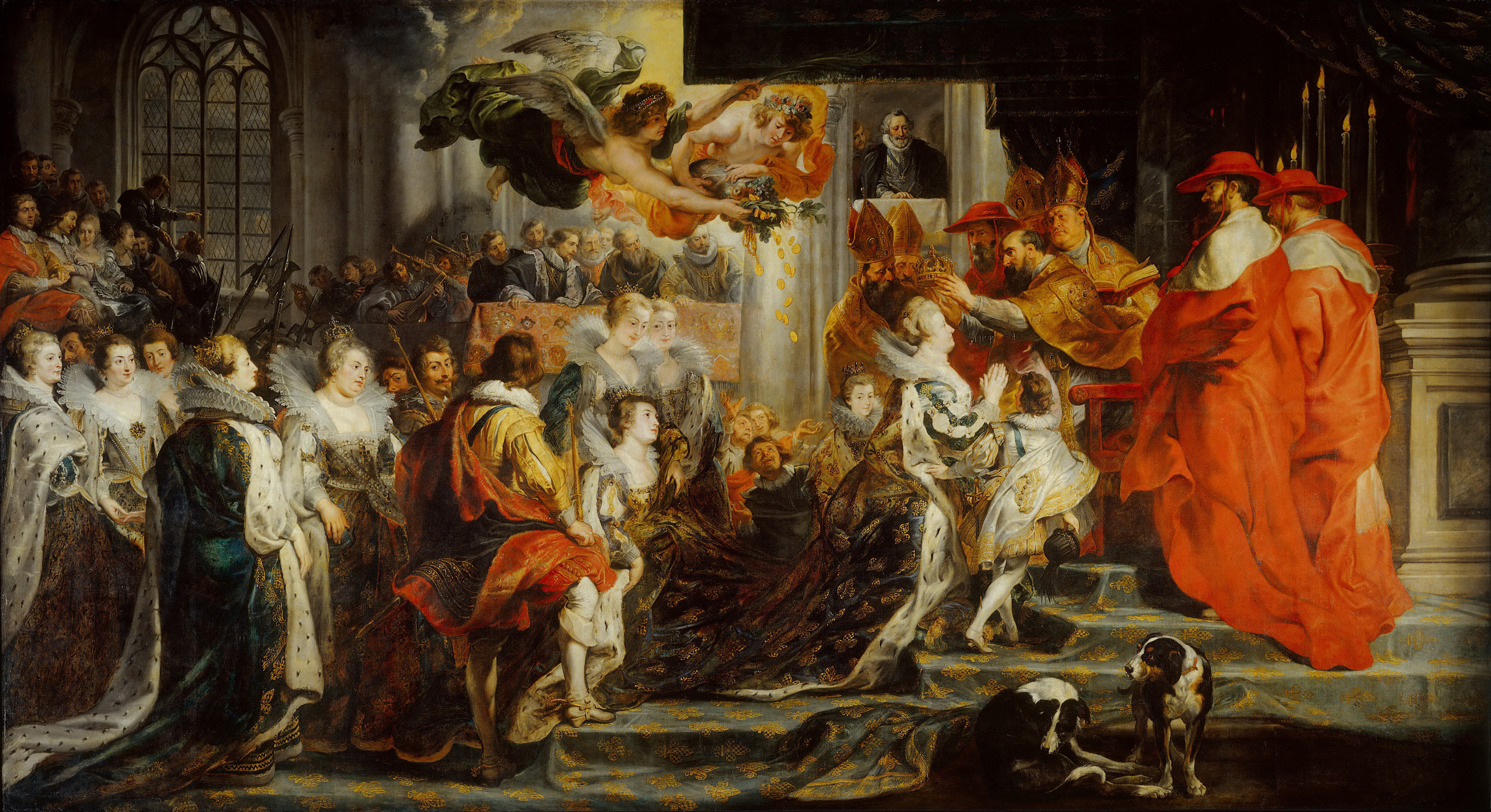
Coronation of Marie de Medicis by Rubens. The dowager princess de Conde are among the three women carrying the queen's train.

This meant that at the wedding of her son Henri to his cousin Charlotte de Montmorency in 1609 she was not allowed to attend. When it became apparent that one of the reasons for the marriage was to enable the king access to her new daughter-in-law, she was charged by her son to keep a watchful eye on the young princess at Condés country estate. Eventually her son fled to Brussels with his wife to keep the king from making her his mistress.

Despite her son being in disfavor with the king the dowager princess was nevertheless seen as of sufficiently high rank to be one of the ladies allowed to carry the train of Marie de Medici at the queen's coronation in 1610.

After her son's arrest and imprisonment in the Bastille by the queen on the urging of his political enemy Concino Concinoi, the dowager princess had her carriage readied and riding out into the streets of Paris and shouted that her son had been assassinated and thus incited a mob to sack the Concinis house.

== Death ==
Charlotte Catherine died in 1629 at the Hotel de Condé.

Charlotte Catherine was buried at the (demolished in the 19th century) church of the Sainte-Claire de l'Ave Maria monastery (monastère Sainte-Claire de l'Ave Maria), situated not far from the Hôtel de Sens in Paris.

== Issue ==
- Éléonore de Bourbon (30 April 1587–20 January 1619) married Philip William, Prince of Orange, no issue;
- Henri de Bourbon, Prince of Condé (1 September 1588–26 December 1646) married Charlotte Marguerite de Montmorency and had issue including le Grand Condé.

== Ancestry ==
Ancestors of Charlotte Catherine de La Trémoille

8. Charles de la Trémoïlle, Prince de Talmond
4. François de La Trémoïlle, Prince de Talmond
9. Louise de Coëtivy
2. Louis de La Trémoïlle, Duc de Thouars, Prince de Tarente
10. Guy XVI Nicolas, Comte de Laval
5. Anne de Laval, Vicomtesse de Thouars
11. Charlotte of Naples
1. Charlotte Catherine de La Trémoïlle
12. Guillaume, seigneur de Montmorency
6. Anne, Duc de Montmorency, Constable of France
13. Anne Pot, dame de la Rochepot
3. Jeanne de Montmorency
14. René, "le Grand Bâtard" de Savoie, Comte de Villars
7. Madeleine de Savoie
15. Anna Lascaris, Contessa di Tenda
