= Henri, Prince of Condé =

Henri, Prince of Condé may refer to:

- Henri, Prince of Condé (1552–1588)
- Henri, Prince of Condé (1588–1646)
