= Henri II, Prince of Condé =

Prince of Condé (1588–1646)

Henri II de Bourbon
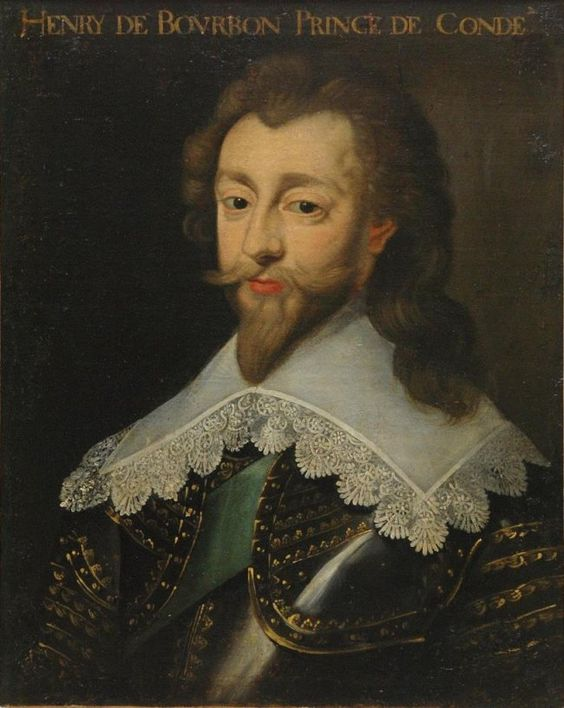

Prince of Condé
- Tenure: 1 September 1588 – 26 December 1646
- Predecessor: Henri I
- Successor: Louis II
- Born: 1 September 1588; Saint-Jean-d'Angély, Saintonge, France
- Died: 26 December 1646 (aged 58); Hôtel de Condé, Paris, France
- Spouse: Charlotte Marguerite de Montmorency
- Issue Detail: Anne Geneviève, Duchess of Longueville; Louis II, Prince of Condé; Armand, Prince of Conti
Names
- Henri de Bourbon
- House: Bourbon-Condé
- Father: Henri I, Prince of Condé
- Mother: Charlotte Catherine de La Trémoille
- Religion: Roman Catholicism

Henri II de Bourbon, Prince of Condé (1 September 1588 – 26 December 1646) was a French prince who was the head of the House of Bourbon-Condé, the senior-most cadet branch of the House of Bourbon. From the age of 2 to 12, Henri was the presumptive heir to the French throne. Henri was the father of general Louis, le Grand Condé.

== Life ==
=== Early life ===
Henri was born in 1588, the third child and only son of Henri I, Prince of Condé and Charlotte Catherine de La Trémoille, daughter of Louis III de La Trémoille, Duke of Thouars. He had two older sisters: Catherine de Bourbon, his paternal half-sister who died unmarried in 1595, and Éléonore de Bourbon, who was married in 1606 at the age of 19 to 51-year-old Philip William, Prince of Orange.

Henri was a posthumous child, his father having died nearly six months before his birth. He became Prince of Condé within weeks of his birth, after being recognized and confirmed by the King of France.

Henri was born in prison after the arrest of his then-pregnant mother in the spring of 1588, following her husband's death, under suspicion that she may have poisoned him. She and her children were released from their captivity after Jacques Auguste de Thou intervened on her behalf with King Henry IV, who was a relative of the young prince.

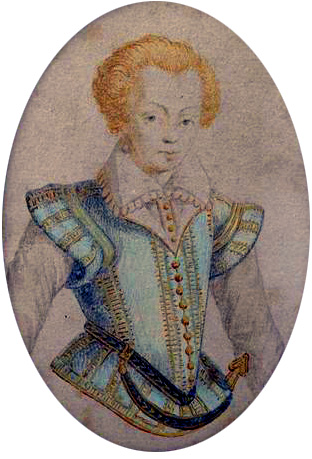
Henri as a boy ( Workshop of Jacob II de Gheyn) held at the Musée Condé

Henry III of France died in August 1589, when Henri was less than one year old, and was succeeded by Henry IV of France, who was the first cousin of Henri's late father. Less than a year later, the new king's uncle (Henri's great uncle) and initial heir, Cardinal Charles, died. This made Henri the King's closest agnatic kin, and he was First Prince of the blood and heir presumptive to the throne of France for 12 years, until the birth of the future Louis XIII in September 1601.

Henri was raised as a Catholic at the insistence of Pope Clement VIII. Henri's father and grandfather had been leaders of the Calvinist Huguenots.

Henri was raised at court but never regarded as a favorite, as he was regarded with suspicion for his potential claims to the throne. Henri grew into what his contemporary Bassompierre described as a "not amiable" young man who was quick to take offense. He much preferred hunting and military life to being at court.

His appearance and personality was described by a contemporary as:

Small and thin, he has very prominent facial features, as all those of the House of Bourbon usually do; he is blond and has the lively French temperament. I find him witty, but he is frivolous and often imprudent in the choice of his confidants. He speaks Latin and Italian, has Spanish and speaks it a little; he is well versed in sacred and secular letters, having had Nicolas le Febvre as his tutor, and pushes his zeal for the Catholic religion very far.

His position at court was further undermined by his relative poverty and much damaged by the court intrigues of his mother, which eventually resulted in her banishment from court. Henri himself was made to deliver the news of the banishment to his mother.

== Marriage ==
In 1609, his marriage with Charlotte de Montmorency was arranged, allegedly because his uncle the king was infatuated with her and expected his nephew would allow Henry IV to take Charlotte as a mistress. Because both bride and groom were first cousins, a papal dispensation was needed. A dispensation was granted and the wedding took place at the bride's father's home in Chantilly.

Instead of bringing his wife to court as the king had demanded, Henri instead took Charlotte first to the Chateau de Breteuil and then to the Château de Muret-et-Crouttes, Henri's home in the country, where she remained under the supervision of her mother-in-law. Charlotte wrote letters to her Montmorency relatives calling herself "la pauvre prisonnière" ("the poor prisoner").

The king continued to demand that Henri bring his wife to court. However, Henri instead went to Muret-et-Crouttes, where he arranged a carriage and escaped with his wife to Brussels, which was then part of the Spanish Netherlands. Some months later, in February 1610, Henri relocated alone to Milan, where the Spanish government was more than happy to defy the French king's request to turn over the prince. Henri took up residence in the palace of the Governor of Milan, Pedro Henriquez de Acevedo, Count of Fuentes, who supplied him with a bodyguard.

Henry IV was assassinated on 14 May 1610. Finally free to return to France, Henri returned to Paris in July 1610 and was greeted by many nobles, the young king Louis XIII and the queen mother Marie de Medicis. Restored to grace, he was reinstated at court.

From 1612 to 1616, Henri was Lieutenant General of New France. He was made governor of Berry.

== Imprisonment ==
Condé was accused of wanting to become the king through a coup and although there was no concrete evidence to back this up, Queen Marie de' Medici had him arrested and imprisoned in the Bastille in September 1616. He was joined by his wife who wanted to share her husband's captivity.

Because of his bad health, the couple was transferred to the Chateau de Vincennes. They had a stillborn son during this time, and it was feared Charlotte would die too. The couple had two more children die at birth during their imprisonment, and they were not released until after the birth of their daughter Genevieve on 28 August 1619.

== Later life ==
From 1611 to 1638, Henri was second in line to the throne of France behind Gaston, Duke of Orleans. This was the period between the death of Nicolas Henri, Duke of Orleans in November 1611 and the birth of the future Louis XIV in September 1638.

== Marriage and issue ==
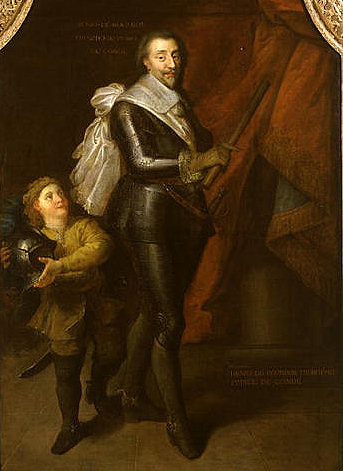
A portrait of Henri II, Prince of Condé.

Henri II, Prince of Condé, Grand Veneur de France.

In 1609, Henri married Charlotte Marguerite de Montmorency, daughter of Henri I de Montmorency, Duke of Montmorency by his second wife, Louise de Budos. In 1610, Marie de Médici, wife of King Henry IV, gave the Hôtel de Condé in Paris to Henri as part of a recompense for his agreeing to marry Charlotte. From then on, the Hôtel de Condé became the main residence of the Princes of Condé until 1764. Henri and Charlotte had six children, three of whom survived to adulthood and were all protagonists of the Fronde:

- Henriette de Bourbon (3 June 1608 – 10 June 1608), died in infancy.
- Jeanne de Bourbon (3 June 1608 – 10 June 1608), died in infancy.
- Pierre de Bourbon (22 December 1618 – 24 December 1618), died in infancy.
- Anne Geneviève de Bourbon (1619–1679), married Henri II d'Orléans, Duke of Longueville
- Louis de Bourbon, Prince of Condé (1621–1686), the celebrated French general known as le Grand Condé.
- Armand de Bourbon, Prince of Conti (1629–1666), married Anne Marie Martinozzi, daughter of Girolamo Martinozzi.

The Condé affair became part of the international conflict known as the War of the Jülich Succession (one of the precursors to the Thirty Years' War).

== Ancestry ==
Ancestors of Henri II, Prince of Condé

8. Charles, Duke of Vendôme
4. Louis I, Prince of Condé
9. Françoise d'Alençon
2. Henri I, Prince of Condé
10. Charles de Roye
5. Éléonore de Roye
11. Madeleine de Maillé
1. Henri II, Prince of Condé
12. François de La Trémoille, Viscount of Thouars
6. Louis de La Trémoille, 1st Duke of Thouars
13. Anne de Laval
3. Charlotte Catherine de La Trémoille
14. Anne de Montmorency, 1st Duke of Montmorency
7. Jeanne de Montmorency
15. Madeleine of Savoy

== Sources ==
- Collins, James (2017). "Dynastic Instability, the Emergence of the French Monarchical Commonwealth and the Coming of the Rhetoric of "L'etat", 1360s to 1650s". In von Friedeburg, Robert; Morrill, John (eds.). Monarchy Transformed: Princes and their Elites in Early Modern Western Europe. Cambridge University Press.
- Knecht, R.J. (1989). The French Wars of Religion, 1559-1598. Longman.
- Pitts, Vincent J. (2009). Henri IV of France, his Reign and Age. The Johns Hopkins University Press.
- Pitts, Vincent J. (2000). La Grande Mademoiselle at the Court of France: 1627-1693. The Johns Hopkins University Press.
- Roche, Daniel (1967). "Aperçus sur la fortune et les revenus des princes de Condé à l'aube du XVIIIe siècle". Revue d'histoire moderne et contemporaine Année (in French). 14 (3).
- Ward, A. W.; Prothero, G. W.; Leathes, Stanley, eds. (1911). The Cambridge Modern History. Cambridge University Press.
- Williams, Hugh Noel (1912). The Love-affairs of the Condés: (1530-1740). Charles Scribner's Sons.

Henri II, Prince of Condé House of Bourbon-Condé Cadet branch of the House of Bourbon Born: 11 September 1588 Died: 26 December 1646
French royalty
Preceded by Charles, Cardinal de Bourbon	Heir to the Throne as Heir presumptive 9 May 1590 — 27 September 1601	Succeeded by Louis, Dauphin of France
French nobility
Preceded by Henri I de Bourbon	Prince of Condé; 5 March 1588 – 26 December 1646	Succeeded by Louis II de Bourbon
Military offices
Preceded by Charles de Bourbon, comte de Soissons	Lieutenant General of New France; 1612 – 8 October 1619	Succeeded by Henri II de Montmorency, admiral of France
