= Anne Geneviève de Bourbon =

Anne-Geneviève de Bourbon
- Duchess of Longueville
- Born: 28 August 1619
- Died: 5 April 1679 (aged 59); Château of Vincennes, France
- Burial: Carmel du faubourg Saint-Jacques, Paris, France
- Spouse: Henri, Duke of Longueville (m. 1642; died 1663)
- Issue Detail: Charlotte Louise, Mademoiselle de Dunois; Jean Louis Charles d'Orléans, Duke of Longueville; Marie Gabrielle; Charles Paris d'Orléans, Duke of Longueville
- House: Bourbon-Condé
- Father: Henry II, Prince of Condé
- Mother: Charlotte Marguerite de Montmorency
- Religion: Roman Catholicism
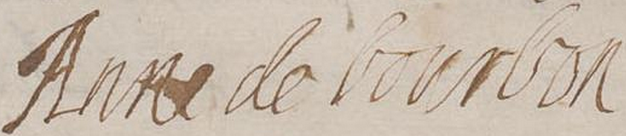
- Signature

Anne-Geneviève de Bourbon (French pronunciation: [an ʒənvjɛv də buʁbɔ̃]; 28 August 1619 – 5 April 1679) was a French princess, remembered for her beauty and affairs, her influence during the Fronde, and her conversion to Jansenism.

== Biography ==
=== Early life ===
Anne Geneviève was the only daughter of Henri II, Prince of Condé, and his wife, Charlotte Marguerite de Montmorency. She was born at the Château of Vincennes, where her parents had been imprisoned for their opposition to Concino Concini, the favourite of Marie de' Medici, who was then regent during the minority of Louis XIII.

She was educated at the convent of the Carmelites in the Rue Saint-Jacques in Paris. Her early years were clouded by the execution of Henri II de Montmorency, her mother's only brother, for his intrigue against Cardinal Richelieu in 1632, and that of her mother's cousin,François de Montmorency-Bouteville, for duelling in 1635; but her parents made their peace with Richelieu, and being introduced into society in 1635 she soon became one of the stars of the Hôtel de Rambouillet, at that time the center of the learned and witty in France.

=== Marriage ===
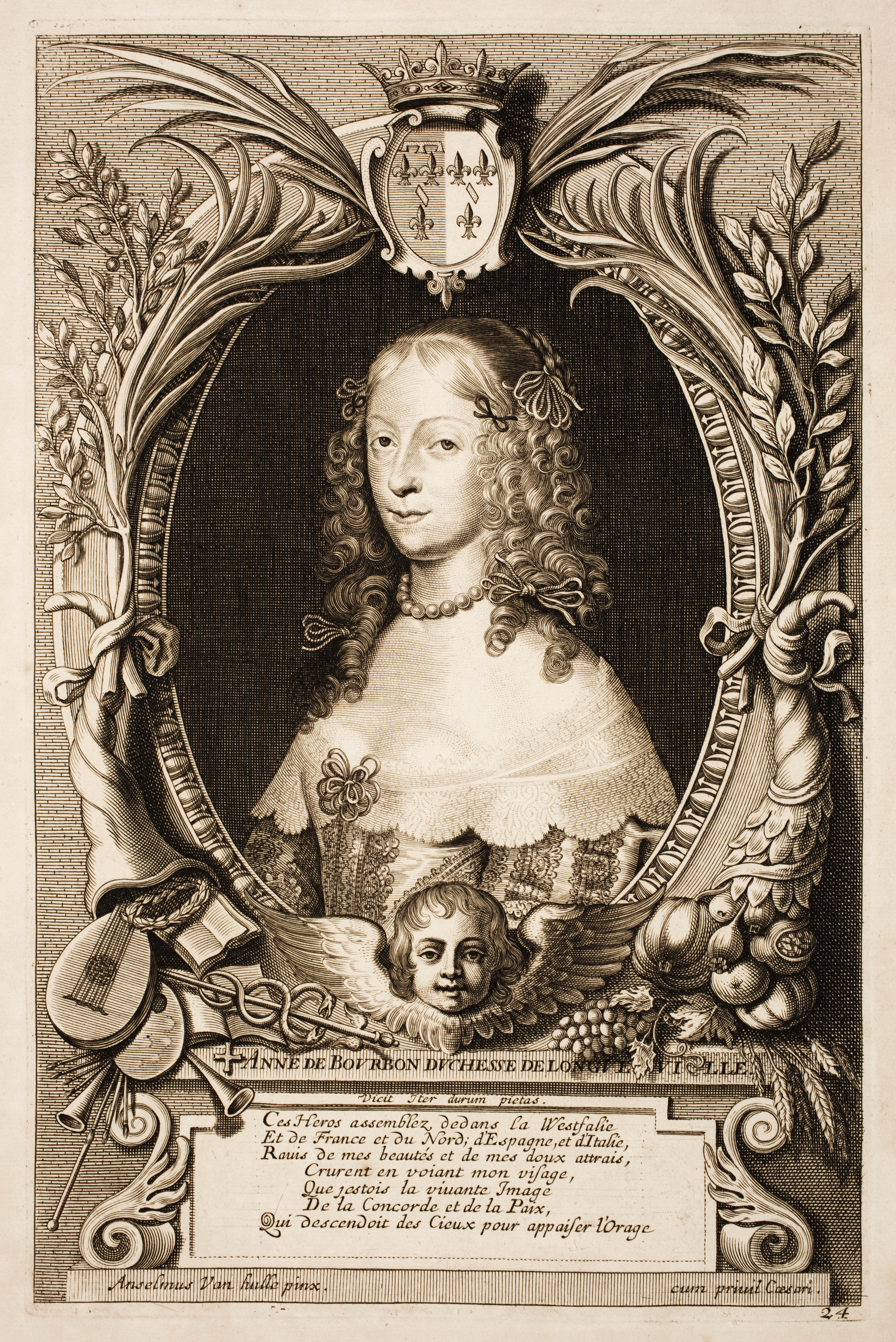
Anne Geneviève de Bourbon, impersonation of Peace and Concord, by Anselm van Hulle.

In 1642, Anne Geneviève was married to Henri II d'Orléans, Duke of Longueville, governor of Normandy, a widower twice her age (his first wife Louise de Bourbon had died in 1637), which turned out to be an unhappy marriage. After Richelieu's death, her father became chief of the council of regency during the minority of Louis XIV, her brother Louis won the Battle of Rocroi in 1643, and Anne Geneviève became of political importance. In 1646, she accompanied her husband to Münster, where he was sent by Cardinal Mazarin as chief envoy, and where she charmed the German diplomats who were negotiating the treaty of Westphalia, and addressed Anne Geneviève as the "goddess of peace and concord".

=== La Fronde ===
On her return, she fell in love with the Duke of La Rochefoucauld, the author of the Maxims, who used Anne Geneviève to obtain influence over her brother, and thus win honors for himself. She was the guiding spirit of the first Fronde, where she brought Armand de Bourbon, Prince of Conti, her second brother, and her husband to the malcontents, but she failed to attract Condé himself, whose loyalty to the court overthrew the first Fronde. It was during the first Fronde that she lived at the Hôtel de Ville and took the city of Paris as godmother for the child born to her there. The peace did not satisfy her, though La Rochefoucauld won the titles he desired. The second Fronde was largely her work, and in it she played the most prominent part in attracting to the rebels first Condé and later Turenne. In the last year of the war, she was accompanied into Aquitaine by the Duke of Nemours, an intimacy which gave La Rochefoucauld an excuse to abandon her, and to immediately return to his former mistress the Marie de Rohan-Montbazon.

=== Jansenism ===
Abandoned, and in disgrace at court, Anne Geneviève retreated into religion. She accompanied her husband to Rouen, and devoted herself to her works. She took for her spiritual director the Abbé Antoine Singlin, famous in the history of Port-Royal. She chiefly lived in Normandy until 1663, when her husband died, and she returned to Paris.

There she became increasingly Jansenist in opinion, and her piety and the remembrance of her influence during the Fronde, and above all the affection her brother bore her, made her conspicuous. The king pardoned her and in every way showed respect for her. She became the protectress of the Jansenists; it was in her house that Antoine Arnauld, Pierre Nicole and Noël Lalane, author of De la Grâce victorieuse, were protected; and to her influence must be in great part attributed the release of Louis-Isaac Lemaistre de Sacy, from the Bastille, the introduction of Simon Arnauld, marquis de Pomponne into the ministry and of Arnauld to the king.

Her famous letters to the pope are part of the history of Port-Royal, and as long as she lived, the nuns of Port-Royal des Champs were left in safety. Her elder son resigned his title and estates, and became a Jesuit under the name of the Abbé d'Orléans, while the younger was killed leading the attack in the passage of the Rhine on 12 June 1672.

As her health failed, she hardly ever left the convent of the Carmelites in which she had been educated. On her death in 1679, she was buried with great splendor by her brother Condé, and her heart, as she had directed, was sent to the nuns of the Port-Royal des Champs.

== Authorities on the Duchess ==
The chief authority for Madame de Longueville's life is a book in two volumes by Villefore the Jansenist, published in 1738. Victor Cousin devoted four volumes to her, which, though immensely diffuse, give a vivid picture of her time. See also Sainte-Beuve, Portraits des femmes (1840). Her connection with Port-Royal should be studied in Arnauld's Memoirs, and in the different histories of that institution.

== Children ==
- Charlotte Louise, Mademoiselle de Dunois (1645–1664).
- Jean Louis Charles d'Orléans, Duke of Longueville (1646–1694).
- Marie Gabrielle (1646–1650).
- Charles Paris d'Orléans, Duke of Longueville (1649–1672).

== Ancestry ==
Ancestors of Anne Geneviève de Bourbon

8. Louis I, Prince of Condé
4. Henri I, Prince of Condé
9. Éléonore de Roye
2. Henri II, Prince of Condé
10. Louis III de La Trémoille, Duke of Thouars
5. Charlotte Catherine de La Trémoille
11. Jeanne de Montmorency
1. Anne Geneviève de Bourbon
12. Anne, Duke of Montmorency
6. Henri I, Duke of Montmorency
13. Madeleine of Savoy
3. Charlotte Marguerite de Montmorency
14. Jacques de Budos, Viscount of Portes
7. Louise de Budos, Lady of Vachères
15. Catherine de Clermont-Montoison
