= Louis IV de Bueil, Comte de Sancerre =

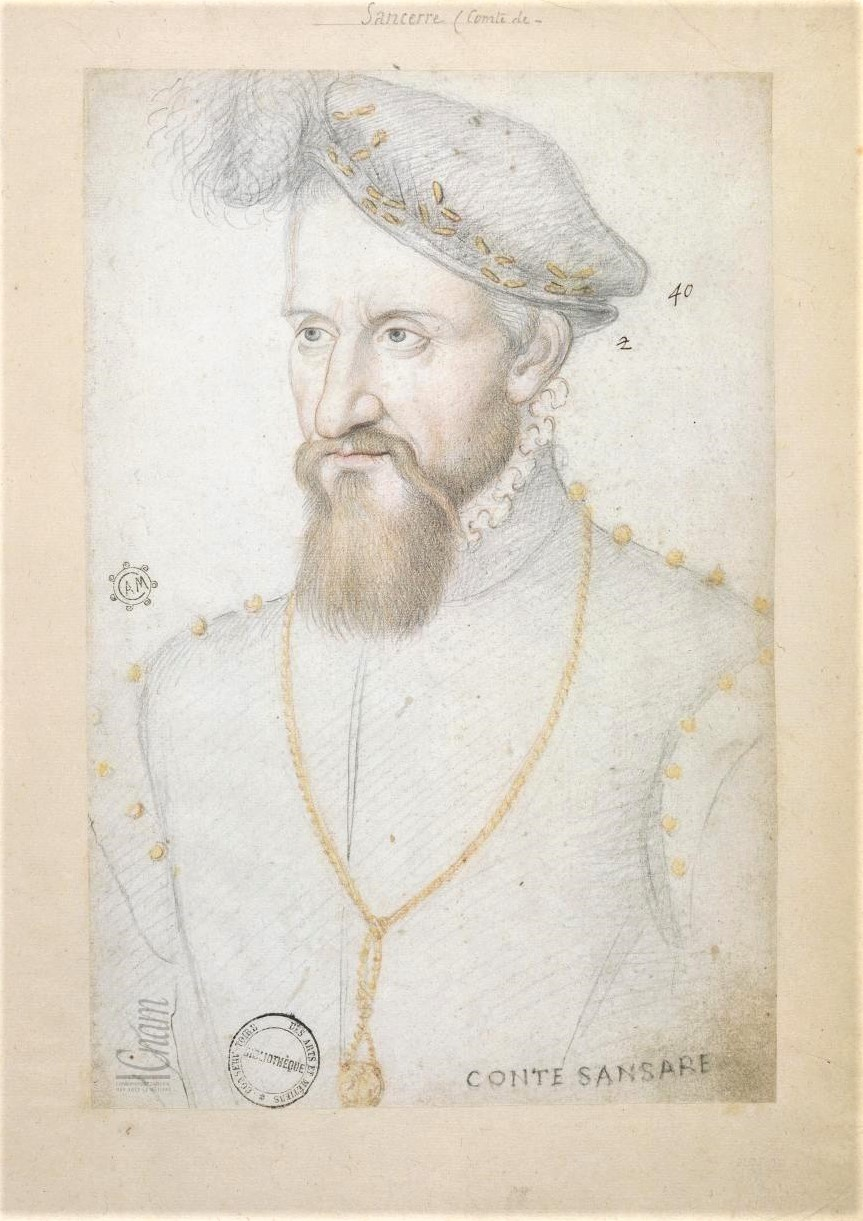
Louis IV de Bueil, Count of Sancerre.

Louis IV de Bueil, Comte de Sancerre (died c. 1565) was the Count of Sancerre from 1537 until his death.

== Biography ==
He fought at the battles of Marignano (1515), where he was wounded, and Pavia (1525), where he was taken prisoner.
In 1537, he inherited the County of Sancerre from Jean VI de Bueil, his young nephew. In 1540 he was appointed cup-bearer to Francis I of France; he was also Knight of the Order of King, governor of Anjou, Touraine and Maine..
He commanded the French defenders during the Siege of St. Dizier (1544). and fought in the Battle of St. Quentin (1557), where he helped save the greater part of the cavalry.

During the Amboise conspiracy (1560), Louis de Bueil rendered great services to the King and kept Touraine in line.

=== Marriage and children ===
He married with Jacqueline, daughter of François de La Trémoille, Viscount of Thouars and had 7 children.
Through his son Claude, he was grandfather of Jacqueline de Bueil, mistress to King Henry IV of France.
