= Louis, Grand Condé =

French military leader (1621–1686)

Louis II de Bourbon
- Le Grand Condé
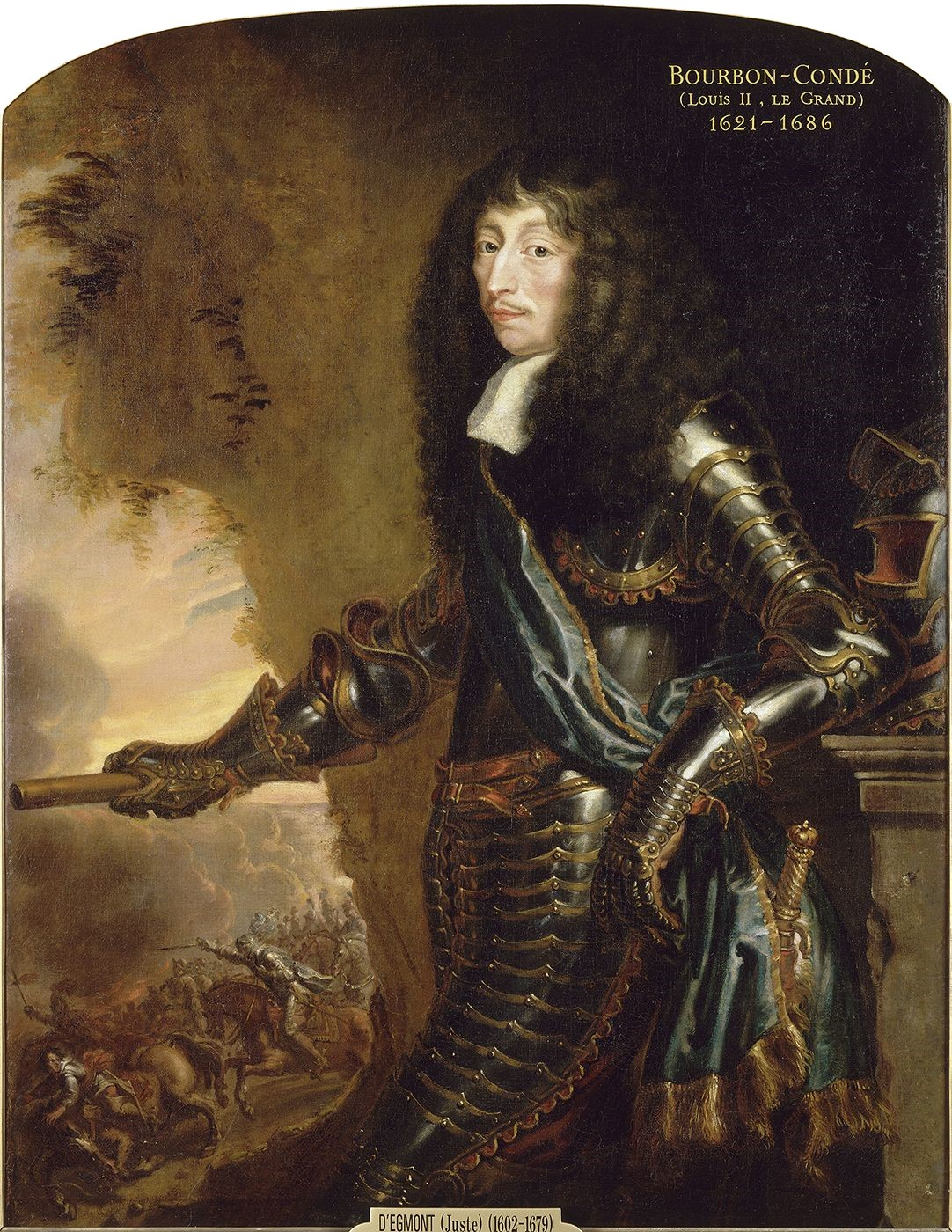
- Portrait by Justus van Egmont, c. 1658

Prince of Condé
- Tenure: 26 December 1646 – 11 December 1686
- Predecessor: Henri
- Successor: Henri Jules
- Born: 8 September 1621; Paris, France
- Died: 11 December 1686 (aged 65); Palace of Fontainebleau, France
- Burial: Église St-Thomas, Vallery, France
- Spouse: Claire-Clémence de Maillé-Brézé
- Issue Detail: Henri Jules, Prince of Condé; Louis, Duke of Bourbon
- House: Bourbon-Condé
- Father: Henri, Prince of Condé
- Mother: Charlotte Marguerite de Montmorency
- Religion: Catholicism
- Military career
- Branch: French Army: • French Royal Army
- Conflicts: See battles: Thirty Years' War (1618–1648); Franco-Spanish War (1635–1659); Battle of Rocroi (1643); Battle of Freiburg (1644); Siege of Philippsburg (1644); Battle of Nördlingen (1645); Siege of Mardyck (1646); Siege of Dunkirk (1646); Battle of Lens (1648); The Fronde (1648–1653); Battle of Rethel (1650); Battle of Bléneau (1652); Battle of Étampes (1652); Battle of the Faubourg Saint Antoine (1652); Battle of Arras (1654); Siege of Landrecies (1655); Battle of Valenciennes (1656); Battle of the Dunes (1658); War of Devolution (1667–1668); Siege of Besançon (1668); Siege of Dole (1668); Siege of Gray (1668); Franco-Dutch War (1672–1678); Battle of Tolhuis (1672); Battle of Seneffe (1674)

Coat of arms of Louis II of Bourbon, Prince of Conde
- Coat of Arms of Louis II de Bourbon, Prince of Condé

Louis II de Bourbon, Prince of Condé (8 September 1621 – 11 December 1686), known as le Grand Condé (French for 'the Great Condé'), was a French military commander. A tactician and strategist, he is regarded as one of France's greatest generals, particularly celebrated for his triumphs in the Thirty Years' War and his campaigns during the Franco-Dutch War.

A member of a senior cadet branch of the House of Bourbon, Condé demonstrated exceptional military prowess from a young age and distinguished himself during the Thirty Years' War, in particular at the Battle of Rocroi against Spain in 1643. He became a powerful and influential figure in France, which made him a threat to Anne of Austria, regent for the young Louis XIV, and her prime minister Mazarin. During the Fronde revolt, Condé initially supported the crown but was later imprisoned on Mazarin's orders. After his release, he launched an open rebellion and fought the royal forces until his defeat by Turenne, after which he defected to Spain. He commanded Spanish forces during the final phase of the Franco-Spanish War.

Following the Treaty of the Pyrenees in 1659, Condé was pardoned by Louis XIV and returned to France. He became a loyal supporter of the king, living a quiet life at the Château de Chantilly and associating with literary figures such as Molière and Racine. Despite his renewed contributions to France's military success in the War of Devolution against Spain and the Franco-Dutch War, his personal life was marred by his unhappy marriage and estrangement from his wife, Claire-Clémence de Maillé-Brézé, a niece of Richelieu. Condé died in 1686 at the age of 65. His descendants include the present-day pretenders to the thrones of France and Italy, and the kings of Spain and Belgium.

== Early life ==
Signature of Gaston, Duke of Orléans at the marriage of Louis, and Claire Clémence de Maillé on 7 February 1641

Born in Paris as the son of Henri II de Bourbon, Prince of Condé and Charlotte Marguerite de Montmorency, he was immediately endowed with the title of Duke of Enghien. His father was a first cousin-once-removed of Henri IV, the King of France, and his mother was an heiress of one of France's leading ducal families.

His father saw to it that he received a thorough education, studying history, law, and mathematics during six years at the Jesuits' school at Bourges. After that, he entered the Royal Academy at Paris. At seventeen, in the absence of his father, he governed Burgundy.

His father betrothed him to Claire-Clémence de Maillé-Brézé, niece of Cardinal Richelieu, before he joined the army in 1640. Despite being in love with Marthe du Vigean, daughter of the king's gentleman of the bedchamber, François Poussard, he was compelled by his father to marry his fiancée, who was thirteen. Although she bore her husband three children, Enghien later claimed she committed adultery with different men in order to justify locking her away at Châteauroux, but the charge was widely disbelieved. Saint-Simon, while admitting that she was homely and dull, praised her virtue, piety, and gentleness in the face of relentless abuse.

Enghien took part with distinction in the siege of Arras. He also won Richelieu's favour when he was present with the Cardinal during the plot of Cinq Mars and afterwards fought in the Siege of Perpignan (1642).

== Thirty Years' War ==
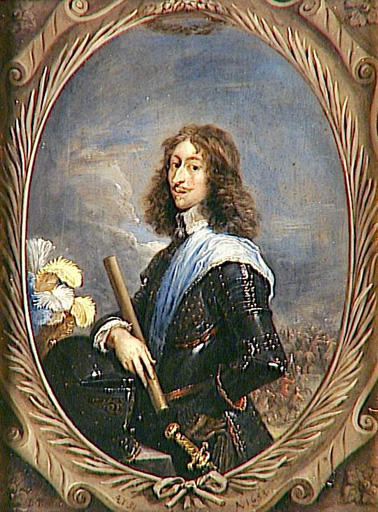
Louis as Duke of Enghien, c. 1640s

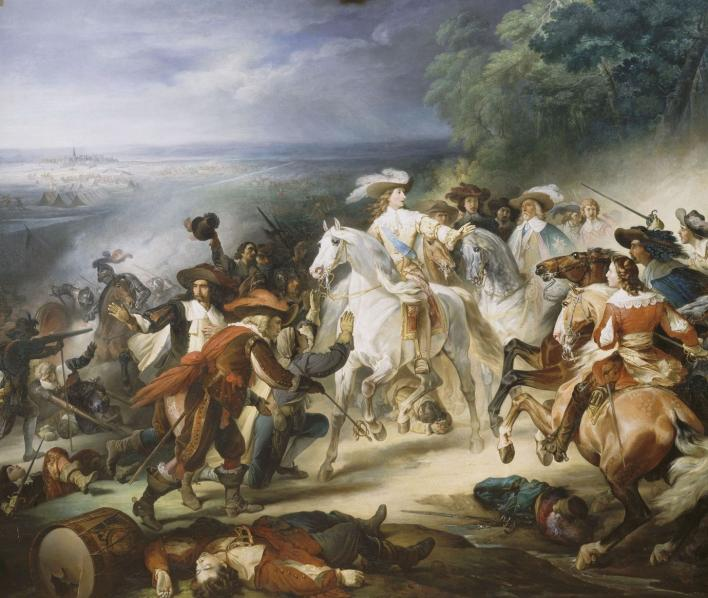
Battle of Rocroi, 19 May 1643, the duc d'Enghien ordering his troops to stop fighting the Spanish, who have come to him to surrender

In 1643, Enghien was appointed to command against the Spanish in northern France. He was opposed by Francisco de Melo, and the tercios of the Spanish army, who were held to be the toughest soldiers in Europe. At the Battle of Rocroi, Enghien himself conceived and directed the decisive victory.

After a campaign of uninterrupted success, Enghien returned to Paris in triumph and tried to forget his enforced and hateful marriage with a series of affairs (after Richelieu's death in 1642, he would unsuccessfully seek annulment of his marriage in hopes of marrying Mlle du Vigean, until she joined the order of the Carmelites in 1647). In 1644, he was sent with reinforcements into Germany to the assistance of Turenne, who was hard pressed, and took command of the whole army.

The Battle of Freiburg was desperately fought, but after Rocroi, numerous fortresses opened their gates to the Duke.

Enghien spent the next winter, as every winter during the war, amid the gaieties of Paris. The summer campaign of 1645 opened with the defeat of Turenne by Franz von Mercy at Mergentheim, but this was retrieved in the victory of Nördlingen, in which Mercy was killed, and Enghien himself received several serious wounds. The capture of Philippsburg was the most important of his other achievements during this campaign. In 1646, Enghien served under Gaston, Duke of Orléans in Flanders, and when, after the capture of Mardyck, Orléans returned to Paris, Enghien, left in command, captured Dunkirk (11 October).

== The Fronde ==
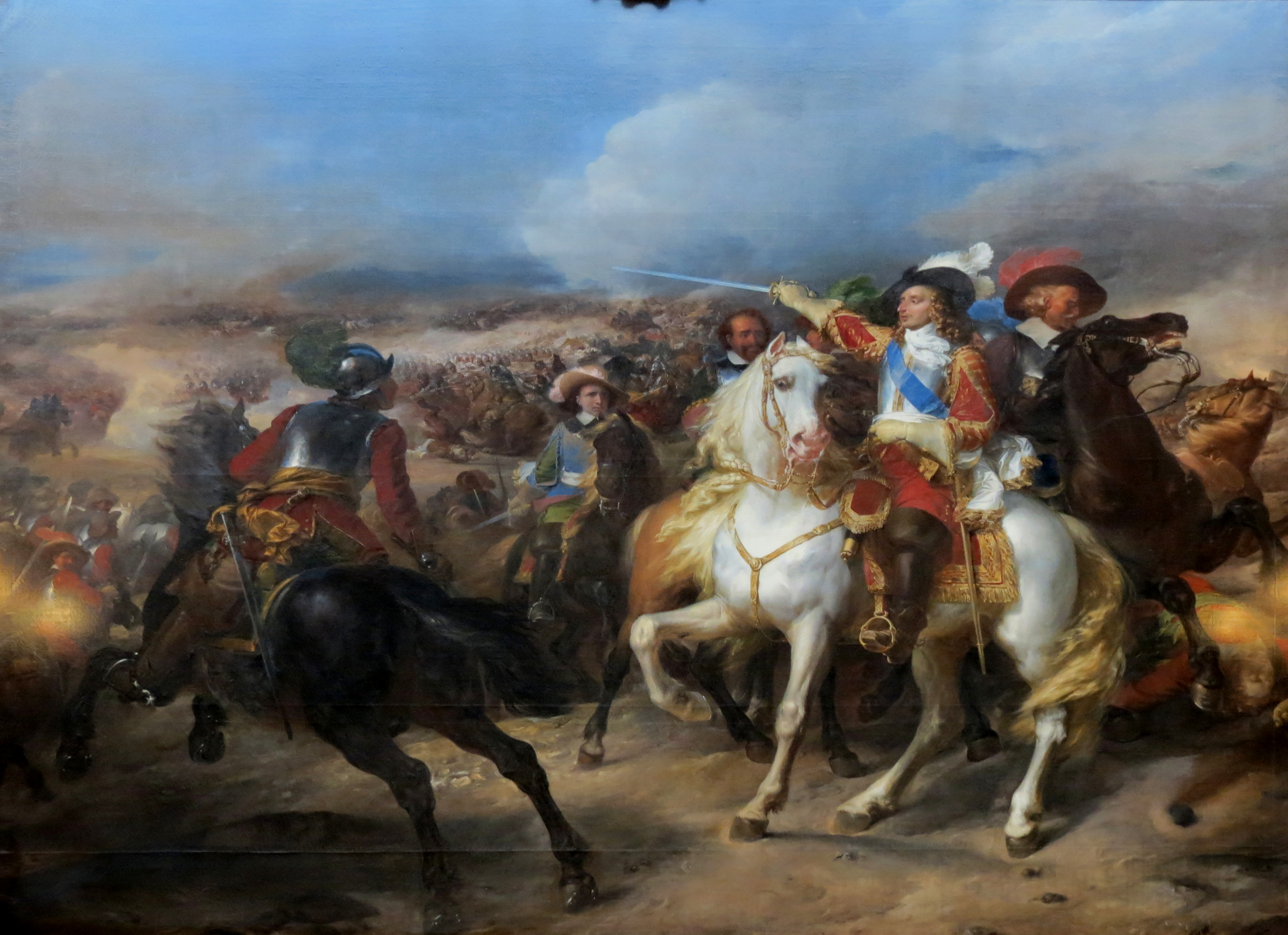
Condé at the Battle of Lens, 20 August 1648

When he succeeded in 1646 as "Prince of Condé", his combination of military ability, noble status, and enormous wealth inspired considerable apprehension in Anne of Austria, regent for the young Louis XIV, and her prime minister, Mazarin. Condé's vast domains included Burgundy and Berry, while the Prince de Conti, his brother, held Champagne, and his brother-in-law, Longueville, controlled Normandy. In 1641, Louis XIII had granted him Clermont-en-Argonne, ceded to France by the Duchy of Lorraine; in 1648, this was converted to an appanage, effectively making it independent of royal authority.

To remove Condé from Paris, Mazarin arranged for him to lead anti-Habsburg forces in the Catalan revolt known as the Reapers' War. By 1648, this had become an increasingly bitter, multi-sided conflict between the Spanish, the Catalan nobility supported by France, and the Catalan peasantry. As Mazarin had intended, Condé could achieve little; however, a Spanish revival in the Low Countries led to his recall and victory at Lens in August 1648.

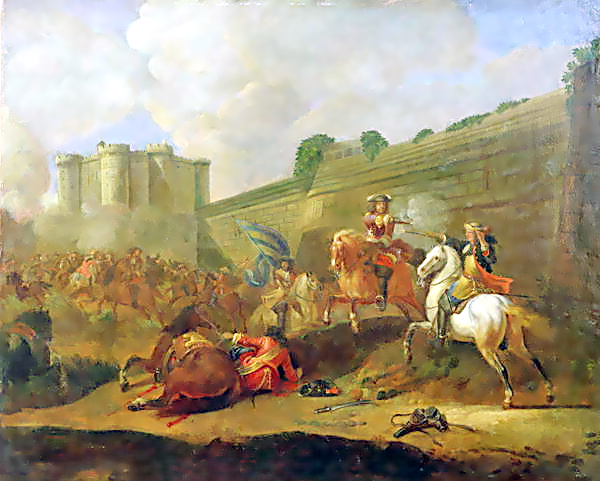
The Battle of the Faubourg St Antoine ended the Fronde as a serious military threat

When the aristocracy took up arms against new taxes in the Fronde rebellion, Condé was recalled to Court by Anne of Austria. He quickly subdued the Parlement of Paris, and the Parliamentary Fronde ended with the March 1649 Peace of Rueil. The resulting uncertain balance of power between crown and nobility inspired Condé to rebel, starting the far more serious Fronde des nobles. In January 1650, he was arrested, along with Conti and Longueville; imprisoned at Vincennes, and when asked if he needed reading material, he allegedly replied "The Memoirs of M de Beaufort", who had made a dramatic escape from the same prison two years earlier.

Turenne and his brother, the Duke of Bouillon, were among those who had escaped arrest; they now demanded the prisoners' freedom, leading to a short-lived alliance between the Fronde des nobles and the Fronde des parlements. Shortly after their release in February 1651, the diverging interests of the two rebellious parties led to a shift of alliances, with the crown and Parlements against Condé's party of the high nobility. The royal forces under Turenne defeated Condé at the Battle of the Faubourg Saint Antoine in July 1652, ending the Fronde as a serious military threat.

Condé only escaped when the Duchess of Montpensier persuaded the Parisians to open the gates; in September, he and a few loyalists defected to Spain. Despite victory over Turenne at Valenciennes in 1656, defeat at the Battle of the Dunes in June 1658 led to the Treaty of the Pyrenees in 1659. Bending his knee to the rising Sun King, Condé was pardoned and restored to his previous titles, but his power as an independent prince was broken.

== Rehabilitation ==
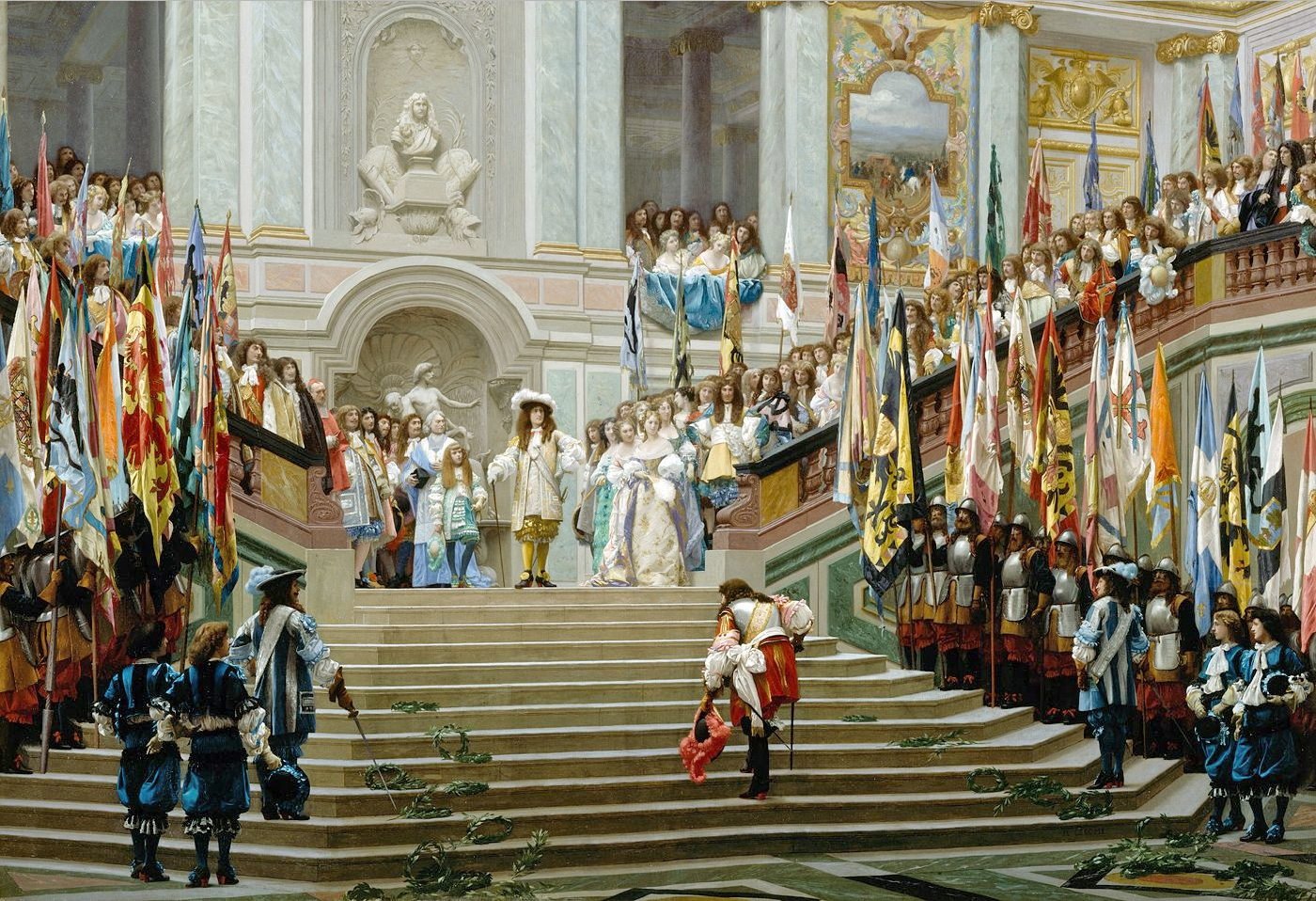
Reception of the Grand Condé at Versailles following his victory at Seneffe. The Grand Condé advances towards Louis XIV in a respectful manner with laurel wreaths on his path, while captured enemy colours are displayed on both sides of the stairs. It marked the end of Condé's exile, following his rebellion in the Fronde.

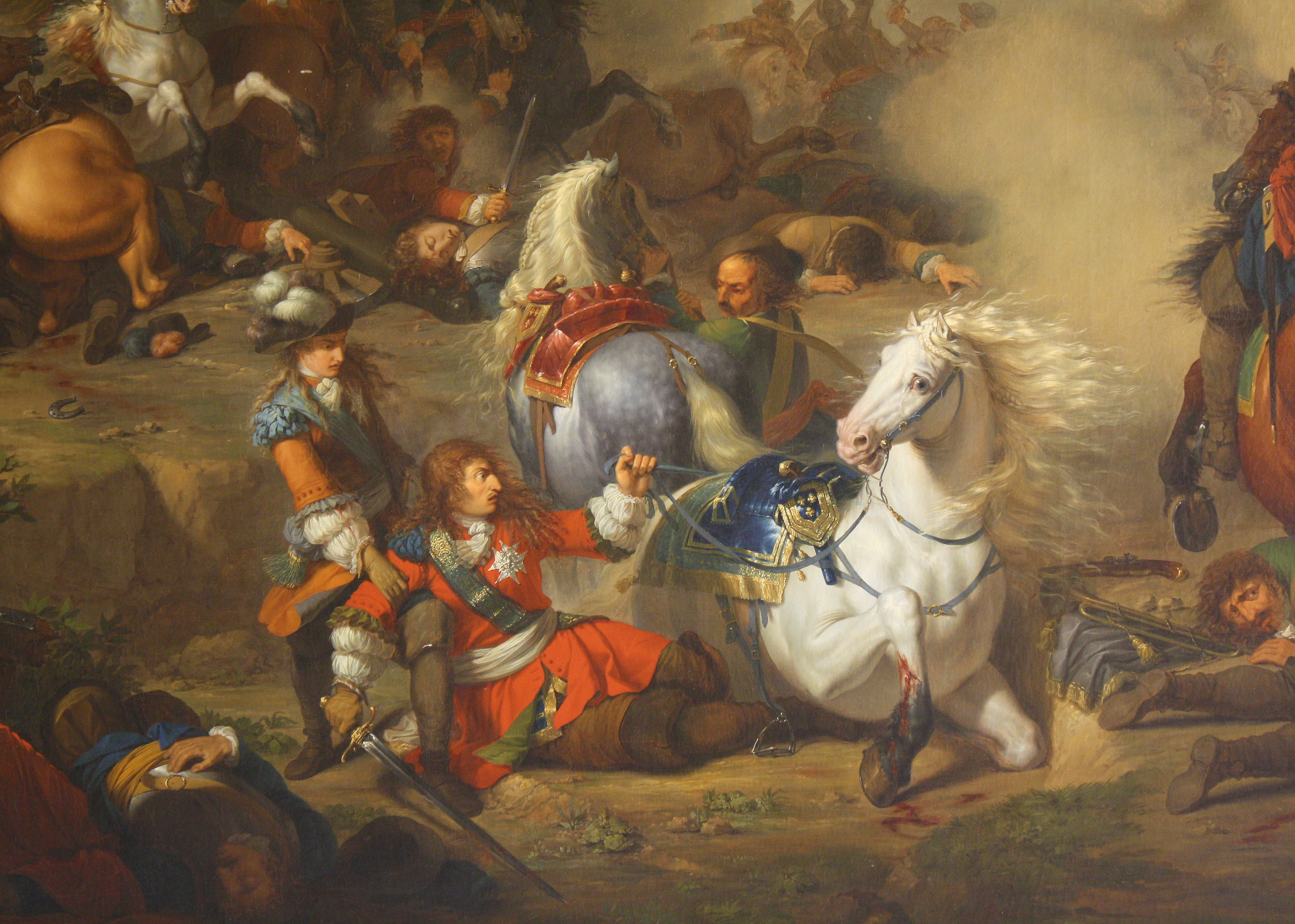
The duc d'Enghien saving his father, the Grand Condé at the 1674 battle of Seneffe

Condé became a loyal supporter of Louis XIV, living quietly at the Château de Chantilly, an estate inherited from his uncle, Henri II de Montmorency. Here he assembled a brilliant circle of literary men, including Molière, Racine, Boileau, La Fontaine, Nicole, Bourdaloue, and Bossuet. About this time, convoluted negotiations between the Poles were carried on with a view to the royal elections in Poland, at first by Condé's son, Henri Jules de Bourbon, and afterwards by Condé himself. These were finally closed later in 1674 by the veto of King Louis XIV and the election of John Sobieski. The Prince's retirement, which was only broken by the Polish question and by his personal intercession on behalf of Fouquet in 1664, ended in 1668.

During the 1666 to 1667 War of Devolution, Condé proposed to the Marquis de Louvois, the Minister of War, a plan for seizing Franche-Comté, the execution of which was entrusted to him and successfully carried out. He was now completely re-established in the favour of King Louis XIV, and with Turenne, was appointed the principal French commander in the celebrated campaign of 1672 against the Dutch. At the forcing of the Rhine passage at the Battle of Tolhuis (12 June), he received a severe wound, after which he commanded in Alsace against the Imperials.

In 1673, he was again engaged in the Low Countries, and in 1674, he fought his last great battle, the Battle of Seneffe, against William, Prince of Orange. This battle, fought on 11 August, was one of the hardest of the century, and Condé, who displayed the reckless bravery of his youth, had three horses killed under him. His last campaign was that of 1675 on the Rhine, where the army had been deprived of its general by the death of Turenne; and where, by his careful and methodical strategy, he repelled the invasion of the Imperial army of Raimondo Montecuccoli.

After this campaign, prematurely worn out by toils and excesses, and tortured by gout, Condé returned to the Château de Chantilly, where he spent his last eleven years in quiet retirement. At the end of his life, Condé sought the companionship of Bourdaloue, Pierre Nicole, and Bossuet, and devoted himself to religious exercises.

In 1685, his only surviving grandson, Louis de Bourbon, married Louise Françoise, the eldest surviving daughter of Louis and his mistress Madame de Montespan. In mid-1686, Louise Françoise, later known as 'Madame la Duchesse', contracted smallpox while at Fontainebleau; Condé helped nurse her back to health, and prevented Louis from seeing her for his own safety. Although Louise Françoise survived, Condé became ill, allegedly from worry over her health. He died at Fontainebleau on 11 November 1686 at the age of sixty-five and was buried at Vallery, the traditional resting place of the Princes of Condé. Bourdaloue attended him at his death-bed, and Bossuet pronounced his elegy.

Although his youthful marriage to Claire Clémence de Maillé had brought him a dowry of 600,000 livres and many lands, Condé's lifelong resentment of his forced marriage to a social inferior persisted. In his last letter to Louis, he asked that his estranged wife never be released from her exile to the countryside. She survived until 1694.

== Issue ==
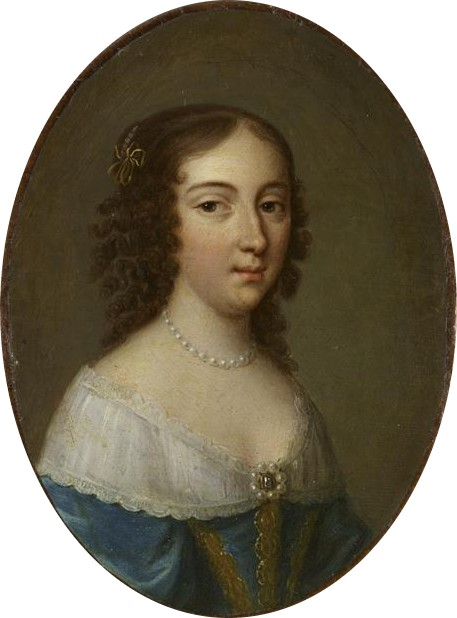
Claire-Clémence de Maillé-Brézé, known as Madame la Princesse

Louis married Claire Clémence de Maillé, daughter of Urbain de Maillé, Marquis of Brézé and Nicole du Plessis de Richelieu, at the Palais Royal in Paris, in February 1641, in the presence of King Louis XIII, Anne of Austria, and Gaston of France. Their children were:

1. Henri Jules de Bourbon, Duke of Enghien (29 July 1643, Paris – 1 April 1709, Paris), who later succeeded as Prince of Condé, married Princess Anne of the Palatinate "Princess Palatine" and had children;
2. Louis de Bourbon, Duke of Bourbon (20 September 1652, Bordeaux – 11 April 1653, Bordeaux), died in infancy;
3. X de Bourbon, Mademoiselle de Bourbon (1657, Breda – 28 September 1660, Paris), died in childhood.

== Legacy ==
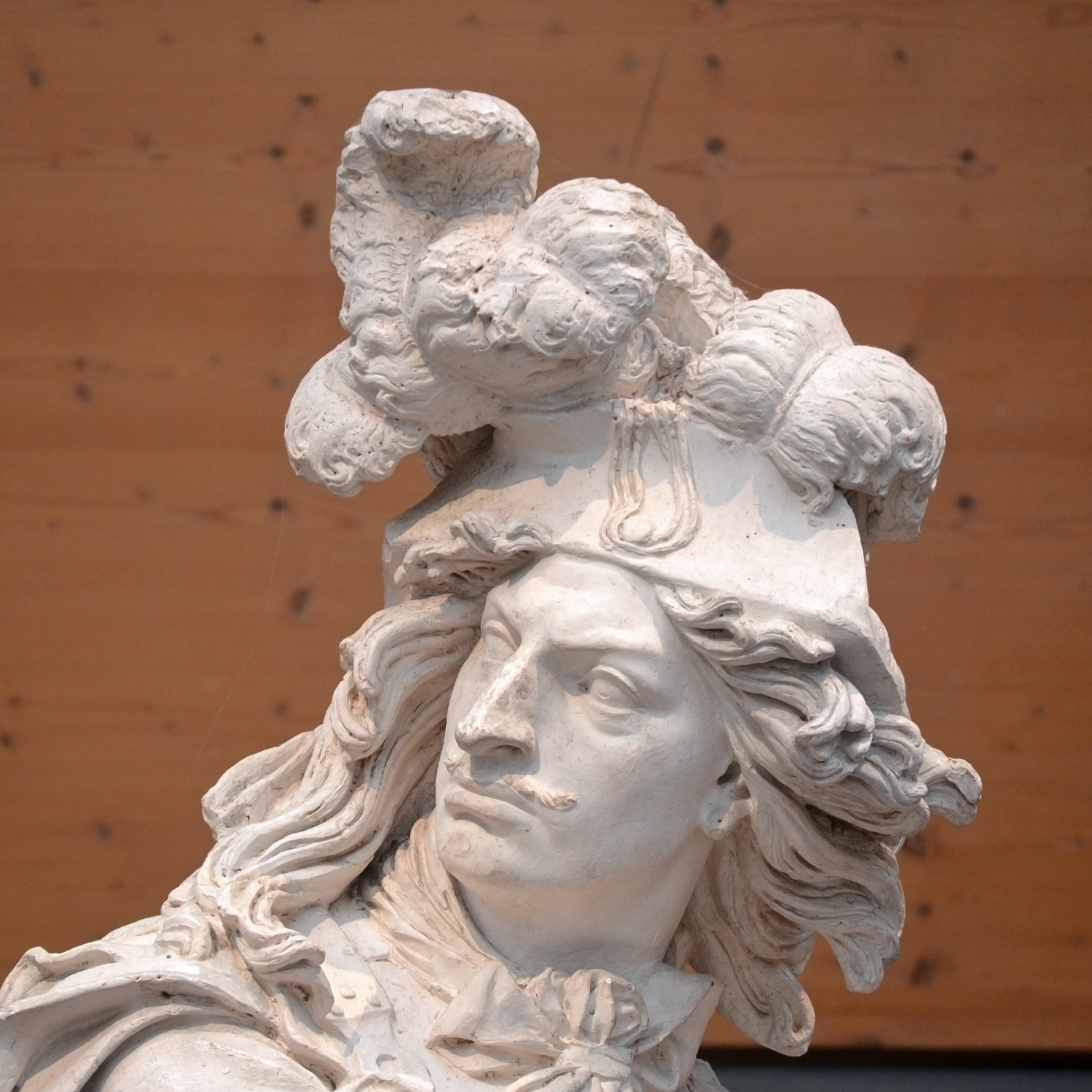
Louis, Grand Condé by David d'Angers (1817).

That he was capable of waging a methodical war of positions may be assumed from his campaigns against Turenne and Montecucculi, the greatest generals opposing him. But it was in his eagerness for battle, his quick decision in action, and the stern will which sent his regiments to face the heaviest losses, that Condé earned the right to be compared to the great generals of his time. Upon the Grand Condé's death, Louis XIV pronounced that he had lost "the greatest man in my kingdom."

In 1643, his success at the Battle of Rocroi, in which he led the French army to an unexpected and decisive victory over the Spanish, established him as a great general and popular hero in France. Together with the Marshal de Turenne, he led the French to a favourable peace in the Thirty Years' War.

During the Fronde, he was courted by both sides, initially supporting Mazarin; he later became a leader of the princely opposition. After the defeat of the Fronde, he entered Spanish service and led their armies against France, notably at Arras, Valenciennes, and Dunkirk. He returned to France only after the Treaty of the Pyrenees in 1659, but soon received military commands again.

Condé conquered the Franche-Comté during the War of Devolution and led the French armies in the Franco-Dutch War together with Turenne. His last campaign was in 1675, taking command after Turenne had been killed, repelling an invasion of an imperial army.

Conde is regarded as an excellent tactician, a fine strategist, and one of the greatest French generals. His masterpiece, the Battle of Rocroi, is still studied by students of military strategy.

His descendants include the present-day pretenders to the throne of France and Italy and the kings of Spain and Belgium.

He was portrayed in the film Vatel by Julian Glover.

== Ancestry ==
Ancestors of Louis, Grand Condé

8. Louis I, Prince of Condé
4. Henri I, Prince of Condé
9. Éléonore de Roye
2. Henri II, Prince of Condé
10. Louis III de La Trémoille, Duke of Thouars
5. Charlotte Catherine de La Trémoille
11. Jeanne de Montmorency
1. Louis II, Prince of Condé
12. Anne, Duke of Montmorency
6. Henri I, Duke of Montmorency
13. Madeleine of Savoy
3. Charlotte Marguerite de Montmorency
14. Jacques de Budos, Viscount of Portes
7. Louise de Budos, Lady of Vachères
15. Catherine de Clermont-Montoison

== Bibliography ==
- Béguin, Katia (1999). Les Princes de Condé. Seyssel: Champ Vallon. ISBN 2-87673-277-7.
- Carrier, Hubert (2004). "Women's Political and Military Action during the Fronde". In Fauré, Christine (ed.). Political and Historical Encyclopedia of Women. Taylor & Francis. doi:10.4324/9780203505939. ISBN 978-0-203-50593-9.
- Bongard, David L. (1995). "Louis II de Bourbon, Prince of Conde". In Dupuy, Trevor N.; Johnson, Curt; Bongard, David L. (eds.). The Harper Encyclopedia of Military Biography. Castle Books. ISBN 978-0-7858-0437-6.
- Keegan, John; Wheatcroft, Andrew, eds. (1996). Who's Who in Military History: From 1453 to the Present Day. Routledge.
- Livet, G. (1970). "International Relations and the Role of France, 1648–1660". The New Cambridge Modern History: The Decline of Spain and the Thirty Years Wars, 1609–1659. Vol. 4. Cambridge University Press. pp. 411–434. doi:10.1017/CHOL9780521076180.015. ISBN 978-0-521-07618-0.
- Nolan, Cathal J., ed. (2008). "Grande Conde (1621–1686)". Wars of the Age of Louis XIV, 1650–1715: An Encyclopedia of Global Warfare and Civilisation. ABC-Clio. ISBN 978-0-313-33046-9.
- Parrott, David (2020). 1652: The Cardinal, the Prince, and the Crisis of the "Fronde". Oxford University Press. doi:10.1093/oso/9780198797463.001.0001. ISBN 978-0-19-879746-3.
- Sternberg, Giora (2014). Status Interaction during the Reign of Louis XIV. Oxford University Press. doi:10.1093/acprof:oso/9780199640348.001.0001. ISBN 978-0-19-964034-8.
- Tucker, Spencer C., ed. (2011). A Global Chronology of Conflict: From the Ancient World to the Modern Middle East. Vol. II. ABC-Clio.
- Tucker, Spencer C., ed. (2015). 500 Great Military Leaders. Vol. I :A-K. ABC-CLIO. ISBN 978-1-59884-757-4.
- Wolf, John B. (1968). Louis XIV. New York: W. W. Norton & Company. LCCN 67-20618.

Louis, Grand Condé House of Bourbon-Condé Cadet branch of the House of Bourbon Born: 8 September 1621 Died: 11 November 1686
French nobility
Preceded by Henri de Bourbon	Prince of Condé; 26 December 1646 – 11 November 1686	Succeeded by Henri Jules de Bourbon
