= Battle of Arras (1654) =

1654 clash between the French and the Spanish

Coordinates: 50.2897°N 2.7808°E

- Part of the Franco-Spanish War
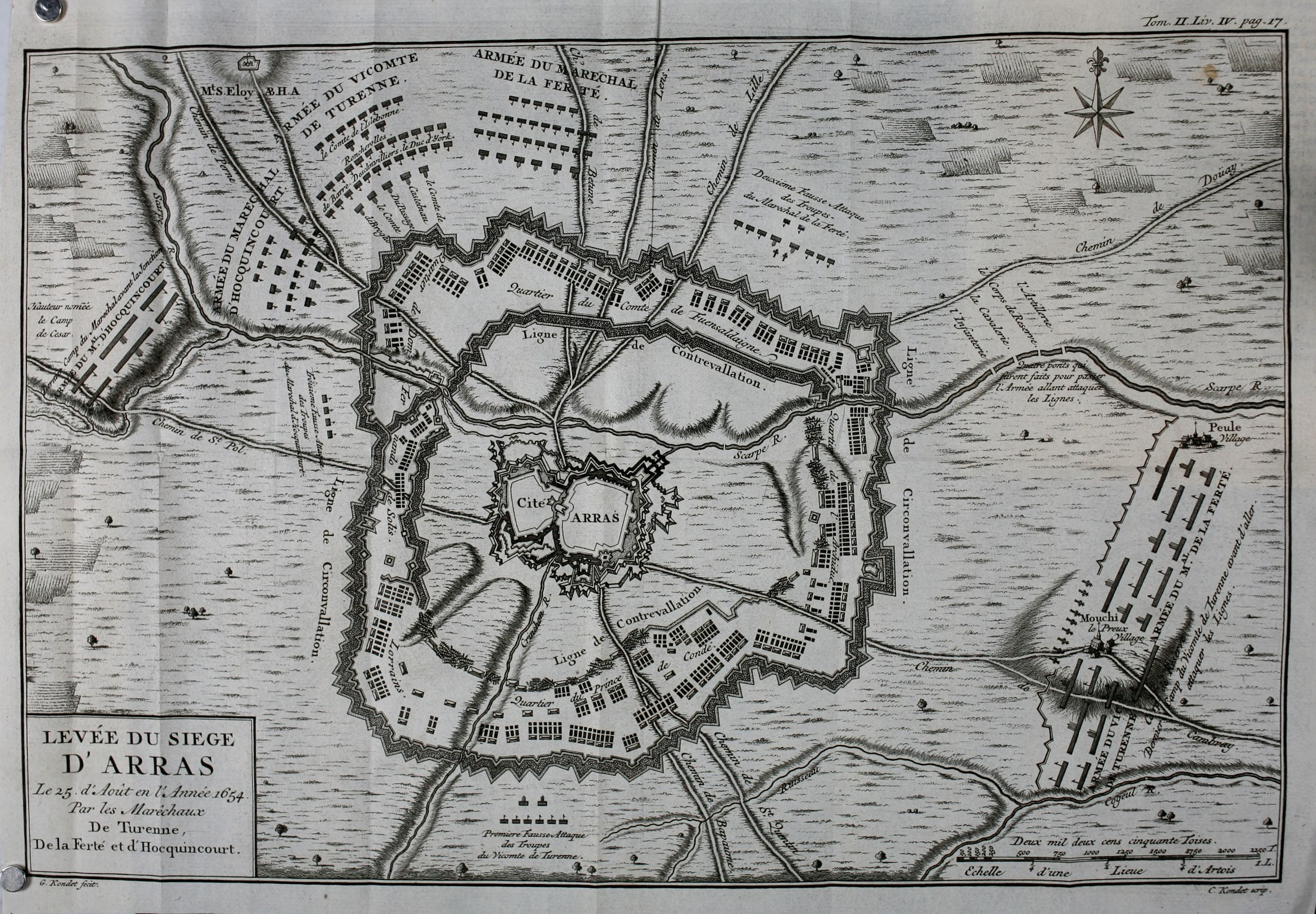
Date	25 August 1654
Location	Arras (present-day France)
Result	French victory

Belligerents
France	Spain

Commanders and leaders
(Kingdom of France) Turenne (Kingdom of France) Henri de La Ferté-Senneterre (Kingdom of France) Charles de Monchy d'Hocquincourt	(Spain) Archduke Leopold Wilhelm (Spain) Grand Condé

Strength
20,000–25,000: 5,000 garrison; 15,000–20,000 relief force	25,000; 63 guns

Casualties and losses
300–1,000 killed and wounded	2,000 killed or wounded 5,000 captured 63 guns 9,000 horses 2,000 wagons 6,000 tents

The Battle of Arras, known at that time as the "Secours d'Arras" 'i.e. Arras Aid, fought on 25 August 1654, was a victory of a French army under Turenne against a Spanish army commanded by Don Ferdinand de Salis and the Prince de Condé.

The place, held by a French garrison, was besieged by the Spaniards under the Great Condé. A relief army under Turenne, d'Hocquincourt and de la Ferté attacked the Spanish lines and totally routed them with a loss of at least 7,000 men. Condé succeeded in rallying the remainder of his army and made a masterful retreat to Cambrai.

Before the battle, Turenne risked exposing himself and his officers in order to reconnoitre the Spanish lines. He was criticised for taking such risks by some of his officers, but the Duke of York, the future King James II of England, later observed that these officers realised their error after they realised that Turenne had worked out where to attack during these reconnaissances. Turenne attacked at night, two hours before daybreak on 25 August. D'Hocquincourt attacked the troops from Lorraine, Turenne attacked the Spanish and provided support for de la Ferté, whose attack was less successful. In the morning Condé counter-attacked, falling on French troops who were pillaging the former Spanish camp. De la Ferté panicked and abandoned some high ground. Turenne rode up and placed some cannon on the high ground, forcing Condé to retreat. The young Louis XIV visited the battlefield and saw the disparity between the numbers of French and Spanish dead. This was Louis XIV's first victory against a foreign army.

Cyrano de Bergerac, who is the subject of the classic French play Cyrano de Bergerac by Edmond Rostand, participated in a siege of Arras in 1640, and not the battle of 1654.
