= Siege of Saint-Dizier =

1544 siege

- Part of the Italian War of 1542–46
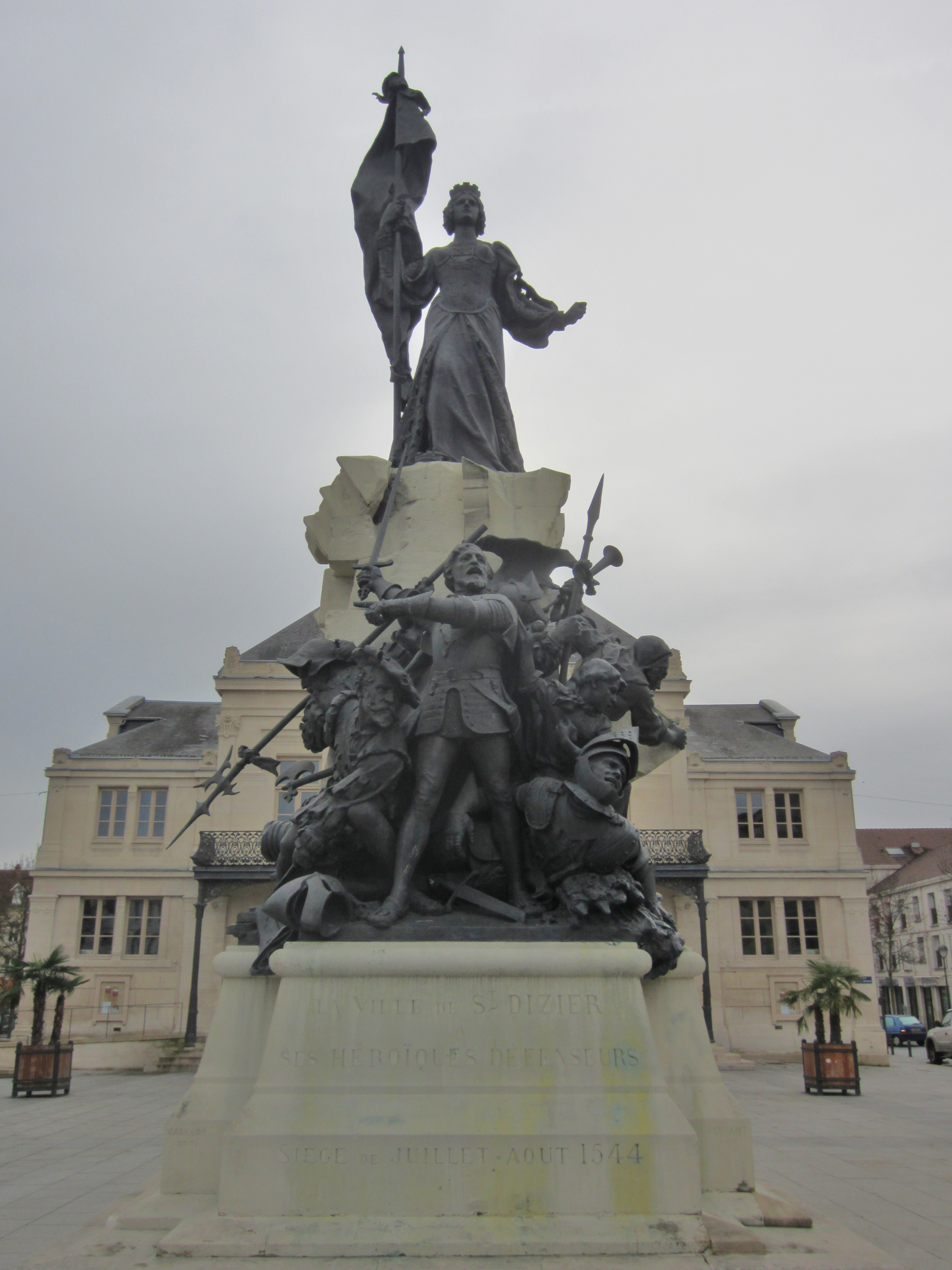
- Memorial monument in Saint-Dizier.
Date	10 July – 17 August 1544
Location	Saint-Dizier, Champagne 48°38′18″N 4°56′59″E
Result	Imperial victory

Belligerents
Holy Roman Empire	France

Commanders and leaders
Emperor Charles V	Louis IV de Bueil; Eustache de Bimont

Strength
10,200 infantry 2,300 cavalry 1,600 sappers	2,100 soldiers 900 civiians

The siege of Saint-Dizier took place in the summer of 1544, during the Italian War of 1542–1546, when the Imperial army of Charles V attacked the French city of Saint-Dizier at the beginning of its advance into Champagne. After a two-month siege and the stubborn resistance by a small French garrison, the fortress fell to the Imperial army, personally led by Charles V.

== Background ==
Emperor Charles' campaign against France in 1543 was inconclusive, as the French army avoided an open battle, and the war devolved into a series of long and costly sieges of small and insignificant forts on the eastern border of France. For a new campaign in 1544, Charles needed all the aid that could be by any means procured.

At the Diet of Speier in 1544, Charles met the German Princes and by extensive concessions secured the neutrality or support of the Protestant Estates; and agreed a peace treaty was agreed with Christian III of Denmark. Also Henry VIII of England was induced to promise to invade France in the coming spring with an army of 35,000 men, fulfilling his obligations in a secret treaty of the year before.

The French under d'Enghien, had invaded Italy, and advanced to recover Carignano near Tirin, which Alfonso d'Avalos Marquis del Vasto had occupied. Del Vasto hurried from Milan to relieve the town, and d'Enghien, having received permission to risk a battle, attacked him at Ceresole on 14 April 1544, completely defeating him, inflicting the loss of some 8000 killed and 2000 prisoners. All Italy began to consider the division of the spoils, but their hopes were vain. The Spanish, holding all the strong places of Lombardy, were enabled to prevent d'Enghien from any further success.

Piero Strozzi, who had collected 10,000 foot at Mirandola, advanced boldly to Milan, in the hopes of joining d'Enghien there, but the Swiss refused to move for want of pay, and Strozzi had to extricate himself as best he could, and the brilliant victory of Ceresole had no results. Still the news of this defeat rendered his successes at Speier the more welcome to Charles.

== Battle ==
An Imperial army under Count William von Fürstenberg (de) now advanced upon Luxemburg and recovered his duchy. The siege of St Dizier was then undertaken. The town was defended by 2000 French soldiers, under the command of Louis IV de Bueil, Comte de Sancerre and Eustache de Bimont, Lord of Lalande. The Imperial forces were vastly superior: contemporary sources give exaggerated numbers of up to 100,000 imperial soldiers.
Charles V himself arrived with an army of 14,100 (10,000 foot, 2300 horse, and 1600 sappers) on 13 July. The next day an imperial commander, René of Châlon, Prince of Orange, was struck by a shot from the defenders, and died the next day with the Emperor by his bed (his title and lands going to his famous cousin, William the Silent). On 23 July, French outposts near the besieged town were overrun with considerable loss to the French, but a French army under the command of Henry, Dauphin of France maintained an observing position at Jalons, between Épernay and Chalons. On 17 August the town surrendered. Charles chose not to attack the Dauphin's army and instead pressed on to Soissons (12 September).

== Aftermath ==
If the army of Henry VIII of England had shown equal enterprise, the case of France would have been desperate. He arrived on 15 July at Calais with the bulk of his army, and was joined by Maximiliaan van Egmond, Count van Buren with a small force from the Netherlands. Leaving the Duke of Norfolk to besiege Montreuil, he proceeded with his main force to besiege Boulogne. Without aid from him Charles had reached the end of his tether. His relations with the Pope were becoming more and more uncomfortable. Pope Paul III had allowed Piero Strozzi to raise troops in his State; the Orsini had been suffered to join him; and the Pope was considering the gift of his grandchild Vittoria to the Duke of Orleans with Parma and Piacenza as her dowry. On the other hand Charles V's position for concluding peace was favorable and he seized it. The result was the Peace of Crépy, signed on 18 September 1544. Henry was informed of the terms which Charles was willing to accept; he disapproved of the conditions; but was forced to content himself with Boulogne, which surrendered on 14 September.

On both sides, the territory occupied since the Truce of Nice was to be restored. Francis I of France was to renounce all claims to Naples, Flanders, and Artois; the Emperor did not insist on the restitution of the duchy of Burgundy. The rivals were to co-operate for the restoration of unity in the Church, and against the Turks. Charles was to give to the Duke of Orleans either his eldest daughter with the Burgundian lands, or the second daughter of Ferdinand with Milan as dowry.

== Sources ==
- Albin Rozet (2013). L' Invasion de la France et le Siege de Saint-Dizier Par Charles-Quint en 1544 d'Apres les Depeches Italiennes de Francesco d'Este, de Hieronymo Feruff (in French). HardPress. ISBN 9781313336369.
- Remy, Charles (1891). Charles-Quint en Champagne; siège de Saint-Dizier; incendie de Vitry-en-Perthois; fondation de Vitry-le-François, 1544 (in French). Reims: Matot-Braine.
- Oman, Charles (2018). A history of the art of war in the sixteenth century. Abingdon, Oxon: Routledge. ISBN 978-1-138-56347-6..
