= Éléonore de Bourbon =

Princess of Orange (1587–1619)

Éléonore de Bourbon-Condé
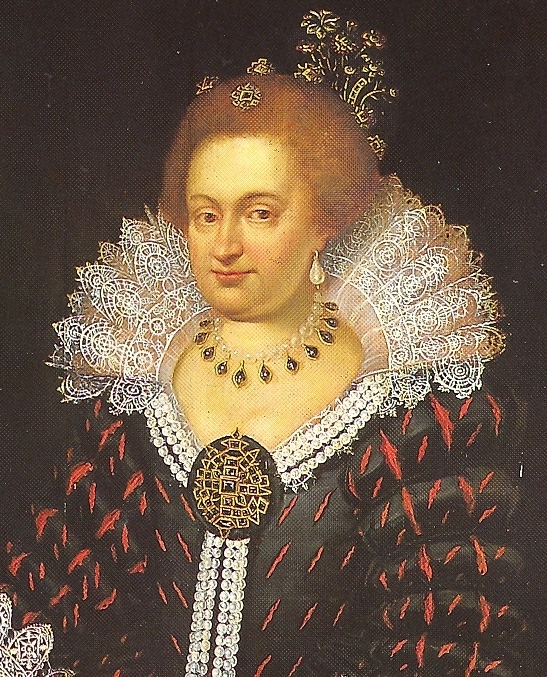

Princess consort of Orange
- Tenure: 23 November 1606 – 20 February 1618
- Born: 30 April 1587; St-Jean-d'Angély, Saintonge, France
- Died: 20 January 1619 (aged 31); Château de Muret, Picardy, France
- Spouse: Philip William, Prince of Orange
- House: Bourbon-Condé
- Father: Henri I de Bourbon, prince de Condé
- Mother: Charlotte Catherine de La Trémoille

Éléonore de Bourbon-Condé (30 April 1587 – 20 January 1619) was the daughter of Henri I de Bourbon and his second wife, Charlotte Catherine de la Tremoille. Éléonore's father was the first cousin of King Henry IV of France. She was also the aunt of Anne Geneviève de Bourbon and Louis II de Bourbon, Prince de Condé.

== Biography ==
=== Early life ===
Éléonore was born on 30 April 1587, and was the first born child from her parents' marriage. Her father died suddenly in 1588, and her mother was accused of murdering him through the use of poison. Her mother Charlotte was only prevented from being executed by the fact that she was pregnant with Éléonore's younger brother Henri.

Éléonore, her mother and her brother were kept in Saint-Jean de Angely for the next 6 years without a trial or sentence being passed. Despite her mothers pleas to relatives for help, it was only through the intervention of the French parliamentarian Jacques Auguste de Thou with Henry IV that they were released.

Éléonore would remain deeply devoted to her brother throughout her life.

=== Marriage ===
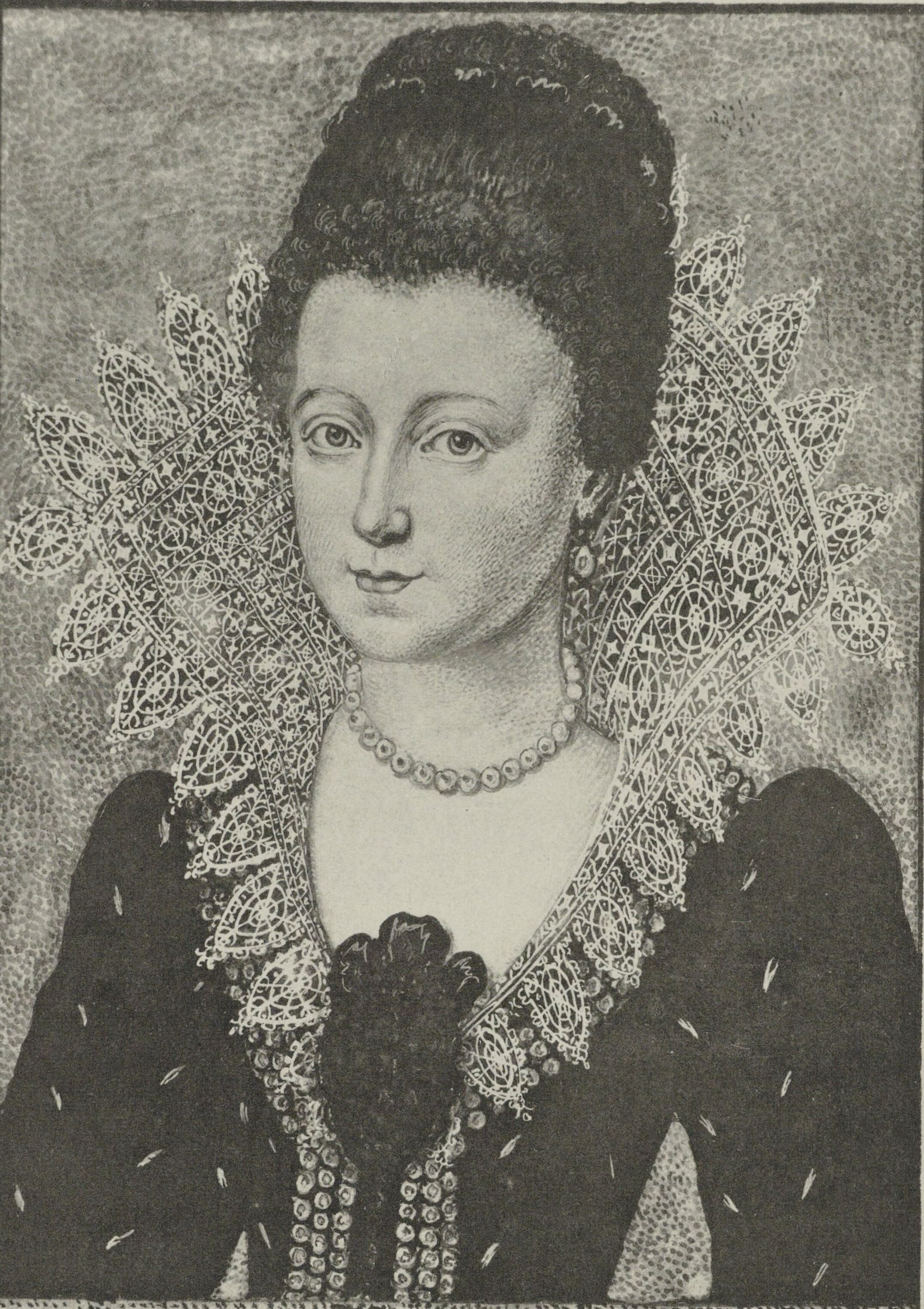
Eleonore of Bourbon -Conde after a lost painting.

Éléonore married Philip William, Prince of Orange, who was already 51 years old, first by proxy in Paris on 19 November and then in person on 23 November 1606, at the Palace of Fontainebleau (other sources say Chateau de Vallery). As Henry IV had previously supported the Prince of Orange's accession, the marriage of his cousin to the prince symbolized the strength of their alliance.

The couple then settled in Orange. The marriage of the two was not welcomed by the brothers of Philip William on account of his having signed a will in 1603 which would leave his lands to his brother Maurice and thus enable him to finally unite his lands. This will would be void if Éléonore and Philip William had a child who would then inherit their father's lands.

After the conclusion of the Twelve Years' Truce and reconciliation between Philip William and his brothers, he and Éléonore made their home in Breda.

In November 1609 her brother Henri and his wife Charlotte de Montmorency arrived in Brussels seeking asylum at the court of the archducal couple Albrecht and Isabella. Their reason for traveling there was to escape from Henry IV who wanted to make Éléonore's sister in-law his mistress. The couple were at first welcomed at court but remaining in Brussels however presented a political inconvenience for the archdukes, and instead Éléonore and her husband brought her brother and sister in law to their residence in Breda which was considered more neutral ground.

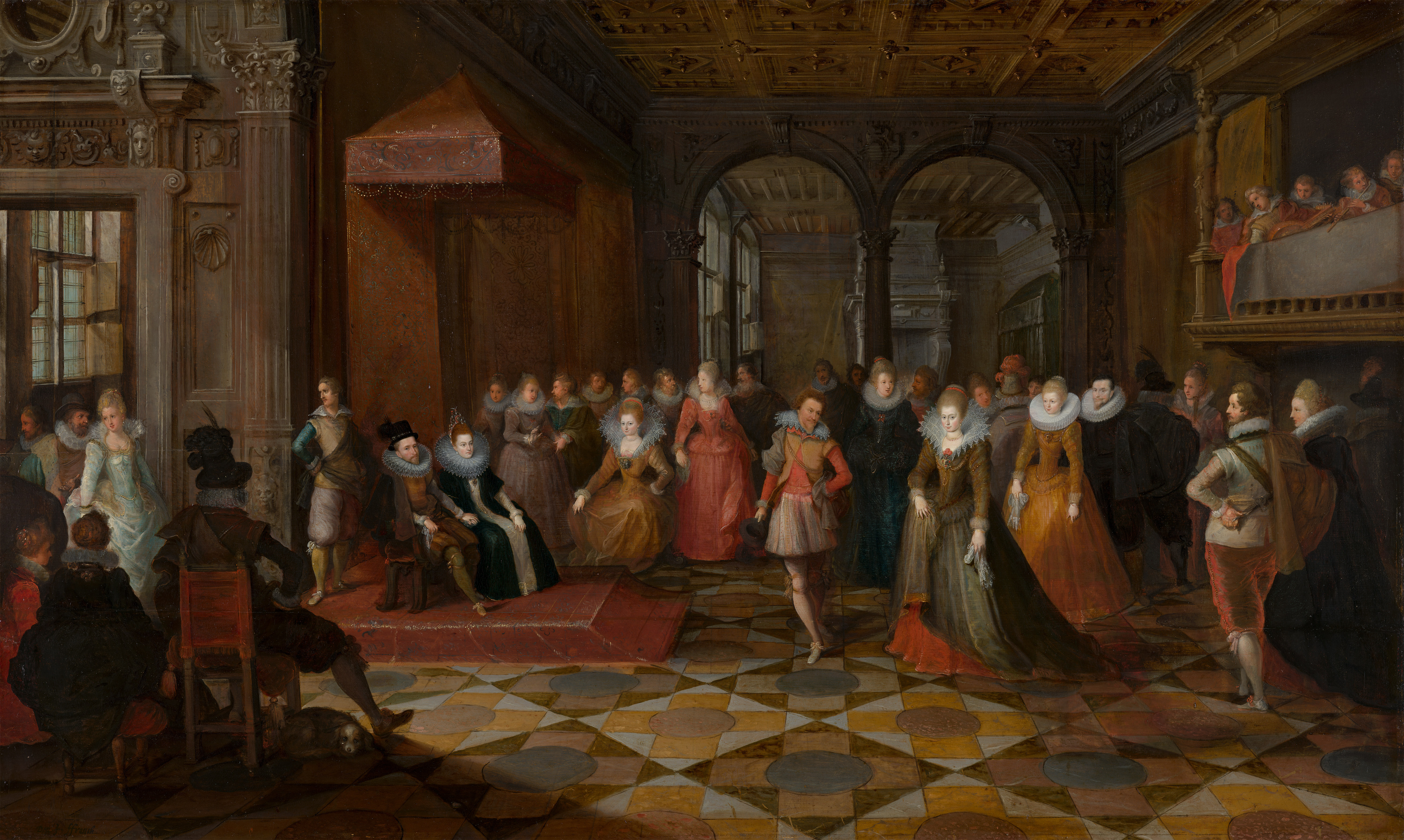
Éléonore and her husband dancing at a court ball in Brussels (c. 1611-1612) by Frans Francken the younger and Frans Pourbus the Younger

On 25 October 1611, it was revealed that the mother of Éléonore and her sister in law Charlotte-Marguerite de Montmorency, would travel to The Hague. The States-General of the Netherlands decided to present the ladies with a fitting gift, partly from politeness, and partly with the view of Henri II de Bourbon-Condé as a potential future ally.

It was decided to offer tableware to the value of 12,000 guilders. The linens were bought at the initiative of the burgomaster of Haarlem, who was also member of the States-General. This was partly due to Haarlem having an international reputation in the manufacturing of quality linen. The linen damask was specially woven with flower motifs, hunting scenery, biblical representations and images from classical literature.

=== Later life ===
When her husband died after a failed medical treatment, Éléonore did not inherit anything, since Philip William had willed all his possessions to his half-brother Maurice of Nassau, Prince of Orange. She had no children, though raised her great-niece, Louise de Bourbon.

When her brother in an effort to be freed from imprisonment after being accused of treachery, he offered to influential courtier the Duke of Luynes, that his brother Honoré d'Albert, 1st Duke of Chaulnes could marry his widowed sister in exchange for his release, but Éléonore rejected the marriage and her brother didn't pressure her to accept.

== Death ==
Éléonore died at Muret-le-Château on 20 January 1619.
