= Battle of Herbsthausen =

1645 battle of the Thirty Years' War

Coordinates: 49°24′07″N 9°49′44″E

- Part of the Thirty Years' War
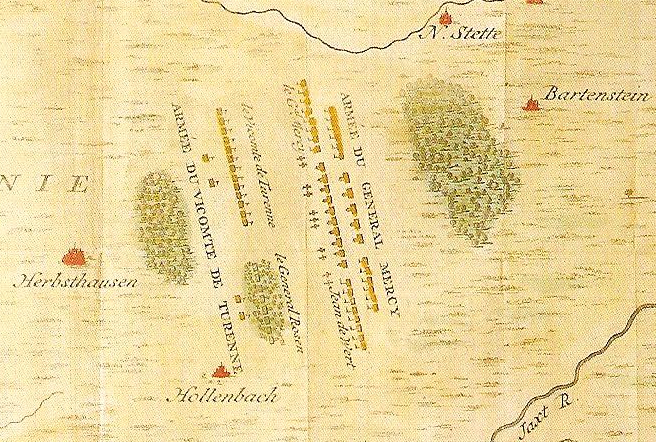
- Battle of Mergentheim (“Mariendal” in the drawing), or Battle of Herbsthausen, of 1645. Plan of action, French depiction.
Date	5 May 1645
Location	Herbsthausen, Bad Mergentheim
Result	Bavarian victory

Belligerents
Electorate of Bavaria	Kingdom of France

Commanders and leaders
(Electorate of Bavaria) Franz von Mercy (Electorate of Bavaria) Johann von Werth	(Kingdom of France) Vicomte de Turenne (Kingdom of France) Reinhold von Rosen (POW) (Kingdom of France) Schmidberg (POW)

Strength
9,650 total	6,000 total

Casualties and losses
600 killed and wounded	4,400 killed, wounded or captured

The Battle of Herbsthausen, 5 May 1645, took place during the Thirty Years' War, near Bad Mergentheim, in Baden-Württemberg. A French army led by Turenne was surprised and comprehensively defeated by a Bavarian force under Franz von Mercy.

In February 1645, Mercy had detached 5,000 cavalry to support the Imperial army in Bohemia, most of whom were lost in the defeat at Jankau on 6 March. Thereafter, he avoided battle until he had assembled enough troops, then surprised Turenne at Herbsthausen on 5 May. The inexperienced French infantry quickly disintegrated and suffered over 4,400 casualties, compared to Bavarian losses of 600.

Despite his victory, Mercy was unable to gain a clear strategic advantage and was killed at Second Nördlingen in August. Although fighting continued, both sides accepted their inability to impose a military solution and stepped up the negotiations that ultimately concluded with the 1648 Peace of Westphalia.

== Background ==
1645-1646 Campaign in Southern Germany, (Bohemia, top right); lines of march usually followed rivers

The Thirty Years War began in 1618 when the Protestant dominated Bohemian Estates offered the Crown of Bohemia to fellow Protestant Frederick V of the Palatinate, rather than the Catholic Emperor Ferdinand II. However, most members of the Holy Roman Empire remained neutral, and the revolt was quickly suppressed, while in 1621 a Catholic League army invaded the Palatinate and sent Frederick into exile.

His replacement as ruler of the strategically vital Palatinate by the Catholic Maximilian of Bavaria changed the nature and extent of the war. It drew in Protestant German states like Saxony and Brandenburg-Prussia, as well as external powers like Denmark-Norway. In 1630, Gustavus Adolphus of Sweden invaded Pomerania, partly to support his Protestant co-religionists, but also to control the Baltic trade which provided much of Sweden's income.

Swedish intervention continued after Gustavus was killed in 1632, but their objectives increasingly conflicted with those of other Protestant Imperial states like Saxony, as well as regional rivals such as Denmark. Following Sweden's defeat at Nördlingen in 1634, most of their German allies made peace with Emperor Ferdinand II in the 1635 Treaty of Prague. The war lost much of its religious nature and became another chapter in the long-standing rivalry between the Habsburg emperors and France, which was supported by Sweden and George Rákóczi, Prince of Transylvania.

Ferdinand III, who succeeded his father in 1637, agreed to peace talks in 1643, but ordered his diplomats to delay since he stilled hoped for a military solution. However, in 1644 the Swedes defeated the Danes, who re-entered the war as an Imperial ally, then destroyed an Imperial army in Saxony. Despite victory at Freiburg in August 1644, the Bavarians under Franz von Mercy were unable to prevent the French capturing Philippsburg, and occupying Lorraine. Mercy withdrew into Franconia, and established winter quarters at Heilbronn.

In 1645, Swedish commander Lennart Torstensson proposed a three part attack on Vienna, to compel Ferdinand III to agree terms. While the French advanced into Bavaria, Rákóczi would join forces with the Swedes in Bohemia, who would then move against Vienna. Mercy sent 5,000 veteran Bavarian cavalry under Johann von Werth to reinforce the Imperial army in Bohemia, which was heavily defeated at Jankau on 6 March.

Armies of this period relied on foraging, both for men and the draught animals essential for transport, and cavalry; by 1645, the countryside was devastated by years of constant warfare, and units spent much of their time finding supplies. This limited operations and materially impacted the battle, since Turenne had widely distributed his army in order to support themselves. Of his 9,000 soldiers, 3,000 never made it onto the battlefield, while many others arrived too late to influence the outcome.

== Battle ==
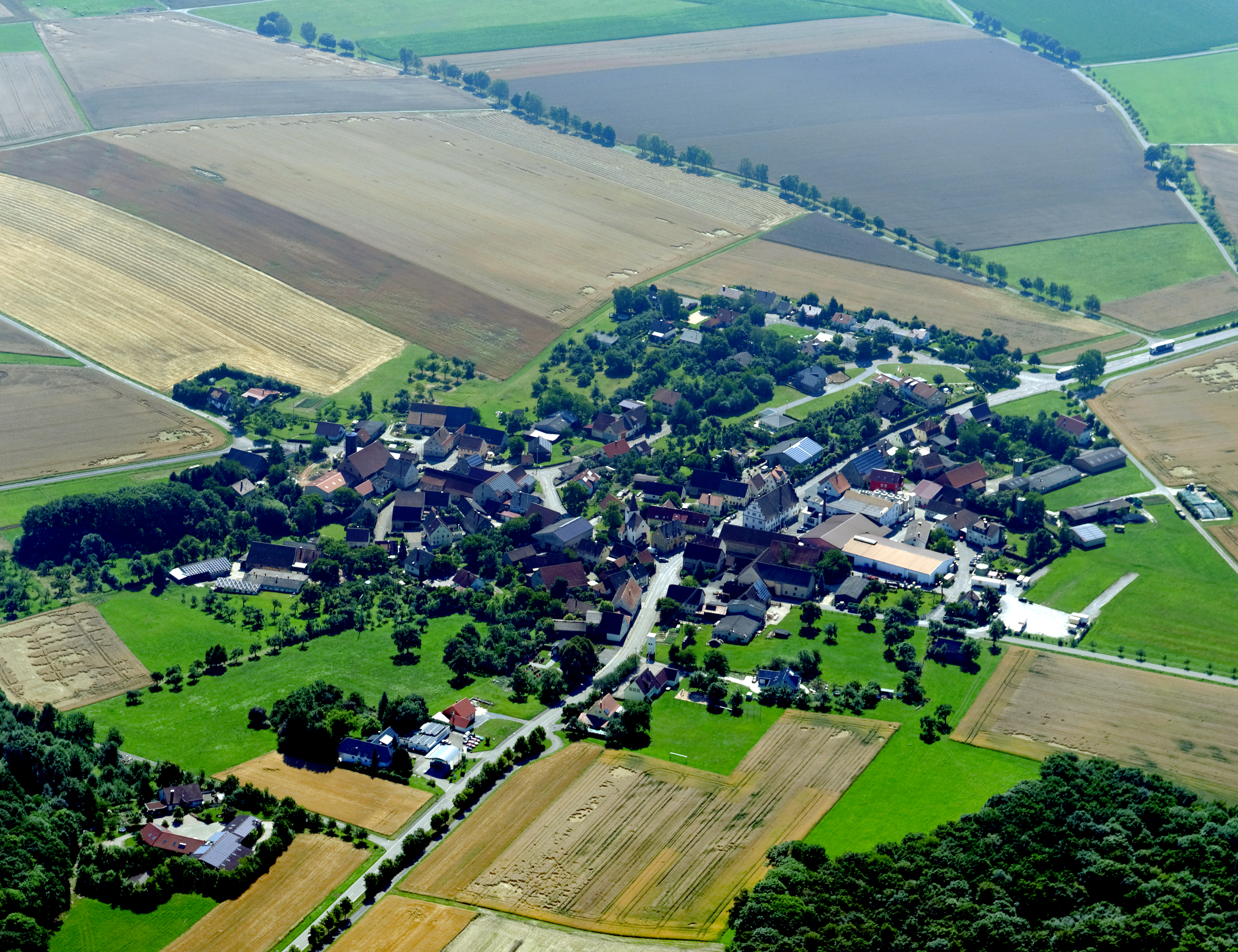
The modern village of Herbsthausen

Victory at Jankau seemed to provide an opportunity to knock Bavaria out of the war, and French chief minister Cardinal Mazarin ordered Turenne to bring the Bavarians to battle. Mercy evaded him until he had more troops and after a month of counter-marching, the French were exhausted and short of supplies; in mid-April, Turenne halted and distributed his army between Rothenburg and Bad Mergentheim while he awaited reinforcements from Hesse-Kassel; most of the veteran French infantry had been lost at Freiburg and Turenne did not yet trust his new recruits.

Although only 1,500 of Werth's 5,000 cavalry returned from Bohemia, Mercy gathered 9,650 men and nine guns at Feuchtwangen, and marched north on 2 May. By the evening of the 4th, they were two kilometres from Herbsthausen, a small village south-east of Bad Mergentheim. They made contact with French cavalry patrols under Rosen around 2:00 am; Turenne ordered Rosen to position his cavalry on the right, while Schmidberg assembled the infantry along the edge of a wood overlooking the main road.

Taken by surprise, Turenne was unable to deploy his guns, while 3,000 of the 9,000 troops in the area did not arrive at all. The Bavarian artillery opened fire, splinters and branches from the trees increasing its effectiveness, and Mercy ordered a general advance. As was common with inexperienced troops, the French infantry opened fire at too great a distance, and dissolved in panic. Turenne led a cavalry charge that scattered Werth's veterans, and fought his way out with 150 others, reaching Hanau in southern Hesse. Rosen, Schmidberg, most of the infantry, along with the Mergentheim garrison, were taken prisoner, while total French casualties amounted to 4,400. The Bavarians lost 600.

== Aftermath ==
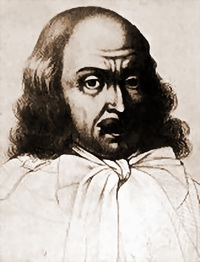
Bavarian commander Franz von Mercy, killed at Second Nordlingen in August 1645

Modern commentators suggest Turenne was simply careless, but huis reputation meant many nineteenth century French writers blamed Rosen for the defeat. Described as a "better soldier than general", in 1647 Rosen was arrested by Turenne for mutiny and only released after 14 months. Although victory restored Imperial morale after Jankau, the strategic position was largely unchanged. Condé, victor of Rocroi, assumed command, and by early July had assembled another army of around 23,000.

Mercy returned to Heilbronn, where reinforcements brought his army back up to 16,000. Over the next weeks, the latter demonstrated his ability to out manoeuvre his opponents, but on 3 August was killed at Second Nördlingen. Despite their victory, the French had also suffered heavy losses and by the end of the year were back where they started, while in September the Swedes agreed a six-month truce with John George of Saxony. Both sides accepted a military solution was no longer possible, and in October they recommenced peace negotiations.

== Sources ==
- Bonney, Richard (2002). The Thirty Years War 1618-1648. Osprey Publishing.
- Clodfelter, M. (2017). Warfare and Armed Conflicts: A Statistical Encyclopedia of Casualty and Other Figures, 1492-2015 (4th ed.). Jefferson, North Carolina: McFarland. ISBN 978-0-7864-7470-7.
- De Périni, Hardÿ (1898). Batailles françaises, Volume IV. Ernest Flammarion, Paris.
- Höbelt, Lothar (2012). Afflerbach, Holger; Strachan, Hew (eds.). Surrender in the Thirty Years War in How Fighting Ends: A History of Surrender. OUP. ISBN 978-0199693627.
- Poten, Bernhard von (1889). Rosen, Reinhold von. Allgemeine Deutsche Biographie 29.
- Setton, Kenneth Meyer (1991). Venice, Austria, and the Turks in the Seventeenth Century. American Philosophical Society. ISBN 978-0871691927.
- Spielvogel, Jackson (2006). Western Civilization (2014 ed.). Wadsworth Publishing. ISBN 978-1285436401.
- Wedgwood, C.V. (1938). The Thirty Years War (2005 ed.). New York Review of Books. ISBN 978-1-59017-146-2.
- Wilson, Peter (2009). Europe's Tragedy: A History of the Thirty Years War. Allen Lane. ISBN 978-0713995923.
