= Guy XVI de Laval =

Count of Laval (1476-1531)

Count of Laval
- Reign: 1501–1531
- Predecessor: Guy XV de Laval
- Successor: Guy XVII de Laval
- Born: 1 October 1476
- Died: 20 May 1531 (aged 54)
- Spouse: Charlotte of Naples m. 10 Jun 1500; dec. 1506; Anne de Montmorency m. 1517; dec. 1525; Antoinette de Daillon m. after 1525; wid. 1531
- Issue: Catherine; Anne de Laval; François; Claude – Guy XVII de Laval; Marguerite; Anne; Charlotte
- House: House of Laval
- Father: Jean de Laval
- Mother: Jeanne du Perrier

Guy XVI, Count of Laval, Mayenne (1 October 1476 – 20 May 1531) was a member of the House of Laval. He was christened Nicolas, but upon inheriting the title, he took the required name of Guy, as his predecessors had done.

== Life ==
Born Nicolas de Laval, he was the son of Jean of Laval and Jeanne of Perrier. He spent much of his youth at the court of his kinsman, Francis II, Duke of Brittany, where he became close with the Duke's daughter, Anne. When Francis died and Anne married Charles VIII of France, Nicolas followed her to the royal court, where they remained close. The queen became godmother to his daughter Anne.

Nicolas was able to learn about his people and the business of land management due to his uncle Guy XV's illness. Upon his uncle's death in 1501, he took the name Guy XVI of Laval.

Guy served the Kings of France with distinction throughout his career. This included service as the Lieutenant General (from 1517), Governor (from 1525), and Admiral of Brittany, where many of his lands were. Guy frequently corresponded with his brother-in-law, Anne de Montmorency to gain insight and favors at the royal court.

Guy maintained a large court of lesser nobles from throughout France and beyond. His lands included Vitré, Lohéac, Montfort, Becherel, Quintin, and La Roche-Bernard. In 1527 he had ordered 162 people being directly paid within his household, and biographers estimated that there were on average 300 people at his court on any given day. For a time, he hosted a representative of the King of Portugal, who came with gifts for Guy. Guy was a strong patron of the arts, and he also enjoyed jousting. At the tournament celebrating the arrival of Mary Tudor in Paris, he jousted over 40 times.

== Marriages and family ==
Guy first married Charlotte of Naples on 10 Jun 1500. This marriage was arranged by his cousin, Anne of Brittany. Their children included:

- François (1503–1522 at the Battle of Bicocca)
- Catherine (1504–1526), who married Claude I de Rieux.
- Anne de Laval (1505–1554), who married François II de La Trémoille

Guy's first wife died in 1506. In 1517, he married Anne de Montmorency, sister of the Constable of France. Their children included:

- Claude (1522–1547), who inherited the title as Guy XVII (r 1531–1547)
- Marguerite, who married Louis V of Rohan
- Anne de Laval, who married Antoine de Silly, comte de La Rochepot

Guy's second wife died in 1525. Some time after that, he married Antoinette de Daillon. They had:

- Charlotte, who married Gaspard II de Coligny

== Sources ==
- Le Doyen, Guillaume (1859). Annales et Chronicques du pais de Laval et parties circonvoisines. Lava: Morin de La Beauluère.
- Walsby, Malcolm (2007). The Counts of Laval. Aldershot: Ashgate Publishing Company. ISBN 9780754658115.
