= François de La Trémoille, Viscount of Thouars =

French nobleman

François de La Trémoille
- Viscount of Thouars
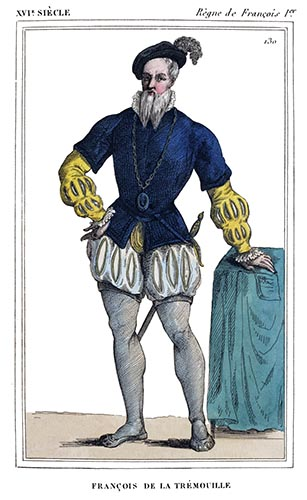
- François de La Trémoille
- Born: 1505
- Died: 1541 (aged 35–36)
- Noble family: La Tremoille
- Spouse: Anne de Laval
- Issue: Louis de La Trémoille, 1st Duke of Thouars; François, count of Benon; Charles, baron of Mauléon; Georges, baron of Royan
- Father: Charles I de la Trémoille
- Mother: Louise de Coëtivy

François de La Trémoille, Viscount of Thouars (1505–1541) was a French nobleman of the La Tremoille family. He was the son of Charles I de la Trémoille (killed in 1515 at the battle of Marignano) and of Louise de Coëtivy.

== Titles ==
François held the title of 36th vicomte of Thouars (1525–1541). His other titles were prince de Talmont, comte of Taillebourg, comte of Guînes, comte of Benon, baron of Craon, baron of Royan, baron of Sully, baron of L'Ile-Bouchard, baron of Brandois, baron of Mauléon, baron of Mareuil, baron of Marans, baron of Rochefort, baron of Sainte-Hermine and baron of Doué.

== Life ==
The la Trémoille family, inheriting the county of Laval after the death of Guy XX of the Laval family, the last representative of that county's direct line. This inheritance obliged the descendants of Anne of Laval, and of François de la Trémoille, to come to stay on the banks of the Mayenne occasionally.

On 31 October 1537 François lost the châtellenie of Rochefort. In effect, a decree of the parlement de Paris dating to 10 March 1536 reunited Rochefort with his domain. The royal officers, always attentive to conserving the interests of their master, were justified by the tenacity of the La Trémoille family, shown especially by a royal debt of 18 000 écus to the family since the battle of Castillon in 1453.

On 23 January 1521 he married Anne de Montfort-Laval (1505–1554), daughter of Guy XVI de Laval and of Charlotte d'Aragon-Naples. Their 10 children were :

- Louis III de la Trémoille who succeeded his father
- François, count of Benon and baron of Montagu († 1555), who married Françoise du Bouchet,
- Charles, baron of Mauléon and baron of Marans, abbot of Saint-Laon.
- Georges, baron of Royan and baron of Olonne and lord (seigneur) of Saujon and of Kergolay († December 1584), who married Madeleine de Luxembourg (daughter of François II vicomte de Martigues) (they were the parents of Gilbert, baron then from October 1592 marquis of Royan, and baron then from January 1600 count of Olonne, who died 25 July 1603),
- Claude, baron of Noirmoutiers and lord of Mornac, of Châteauneuf-sur-Sarthe, of Saint-Germain, of Buron, and of La Roche-Diré († 1566), who married Antoinette de Maillé,
- Louise baroness of Rochefort († 1569) who married Philippe de Lévis,
- Jacqueline, baroness of Marans, of Sainte-Hermine, of Brandois, and of La Mothe-Achard († 1599), who married Louis IV de Bueil, Comte de Sancerre,
- Charlotte who became a nun.

== Ancestry ==
Ancestors of François de La Trémoille, Viscount of Thouars

16. Georges de la Trémoille
8. Louis I de la Trémoille
17. Catherine de l'Isle-Bouchard
4. Louis II de la Trémoille
18. Louis d'Amboise
9. Marguerite d'Amboise
19. Louise-Marie de Rieux
2. Charles I de la Trémoille
20. John I, Duke of Bourbon
10. Louis I, Count of Montpensier
21. Marie of Berry, Duchess of Auvergne
5. Gabrielle de Bourbon
22. Bertrand VI de La Tour
11. Gabrielle de La Tour
23. Louise de La Trémoille
1. François II de La Trémoille
6. Charles de Coëtivy
3. Louise de Coëtivy
28. Louis I, Duke of Orléans
14. John, Count of Angoulême
29. Valentina Visconti
7. Jeanne of Orléans
30. Alain IX of Rohan
15. Marguerite de Rohan
31. Margaret of Brittany

== Sources ==
- Bardet, Jean-Pierre; Dinet, Dominique; Poussou, Jean-Pierre; Vignal, Marie Catherine, eds. (2000). Etat et société en France aux XVIIe et XVIIIe siècles (in French). Presses de l'Universitie de Paris-Sorbonne.
