= Jacqueline de Bueil =

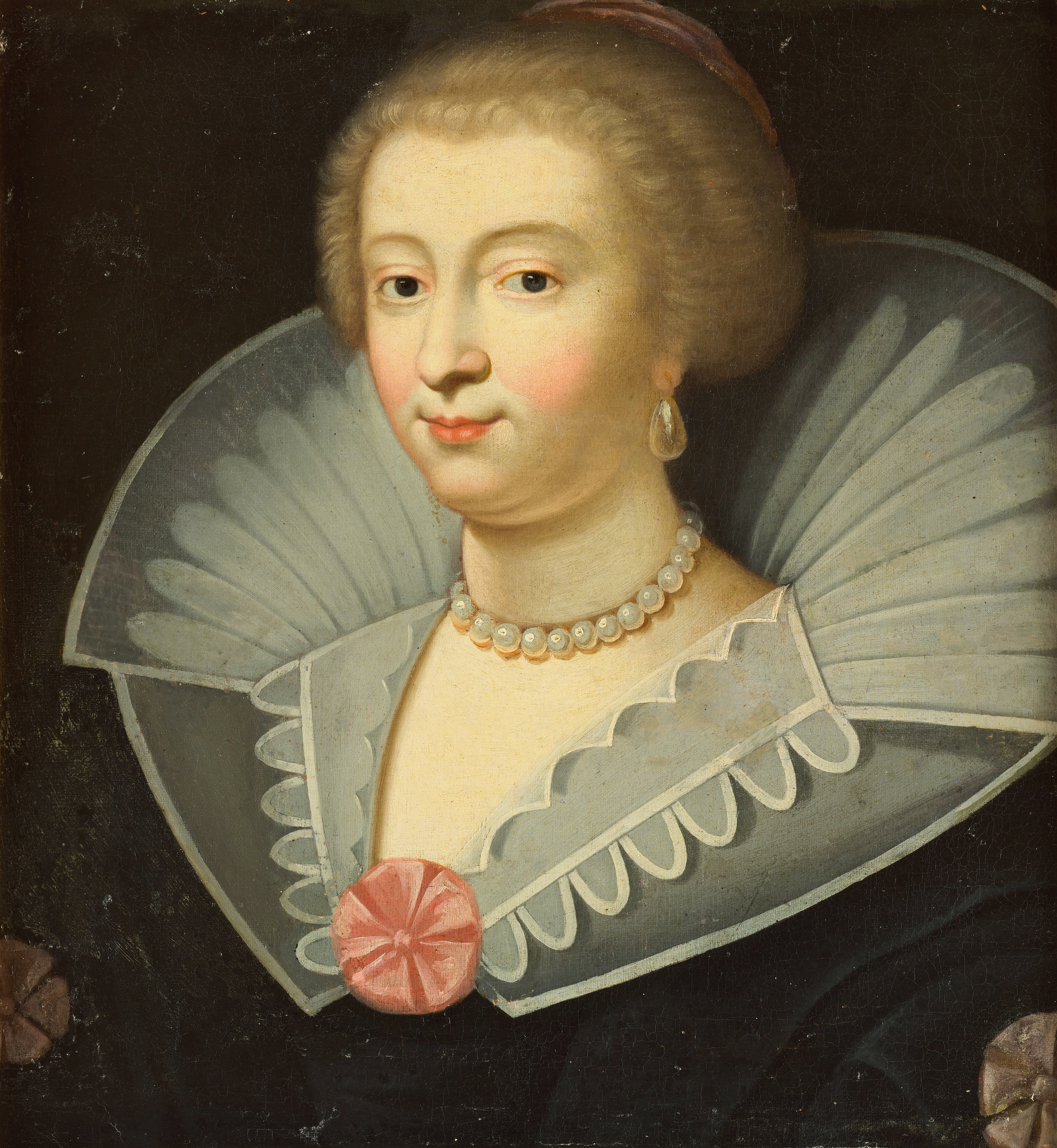
Jacqueline de Bueil, portrait held at Château de Bussy-Rabutin

Jacqueline de Bueil (1588–1651), was a French noblewoman and mistress to Henry IV of France in 1604-1608.

== Early life ==
She was born as daughter of Claude de Bueil, Seigneur de Courcillon (1537-1596) and his wife Catherine de Montcler. When both her parents died in 1596 she and her siblings now orphaned, were distributed among relatives and Jacqueline was placed with a cousin of her grandmother, Charlotte Catherine de La Trémoille .

== Marriages and court life ==
Her guardian, the princess dowager presented de Bueil at court sometime around 1604. The young and beautiful noblewoman caught Henry IVs attention to the joy of her guardian who anticipated that she now would gain the king's favours. But instead de Bueil after becoming the king's mistress distanced herself from the princess and proved not at all grateful- and finally tired of the demands of her former foster mother, she had the king to banish the dowager princess from appearing at court or - anywhere in sight of the king and queen.

Although firstly married Saint-Maur-des-Fossés on October 5, 1604 to Philippe de Harlay de Champvallon (1582-1652), Count de Césy, a nephew of Jacques de Harlay a lover of the former wife of Henry IV, Margaret of Valois.

She had a child with the king, Antoine de Bourbon-Bueil (1606-1632) who was legitimized in March 1608. She was also known to have had affairs with several other men at court, among them with Claude de Lorraine, Duke of Chevreuse, and participated in several plots. In 1607 she divorced her husband and later married René II Crespin Crespin du Bec, Marquis de Vardes and had legitimate issue with him.

She died in 1651 at Moret due to poisoning after her apothecary accidentally gave her potassium nitrate (though rumors said she was poisoned by her husband as he wanted to marry someone else. She was buried in church of Moret-sur-le-Loing, in the chapel of Notre-Dame de la Pitié.
