= Anne de Laval, Viscountess of Thouars =

French noblewoman (1505-1554)

Anne de Laval
- Born: 23 September 1505; Vitré
- Died: 1554 (aged 48–49); Craon
- Noble family: Laval (by birth); La Trémoille (by marriage)
- Spouse: François de la Trémoïlle
- Issue: Louis de La Trémoille, 1st Duke of Thouars
- Father: Guy XVI de Laval
- Mother: Charlotte of Aragon

Anne de Laval (23 September 1505 – 1554), Princess of Taranto, was a French noblewoman and nominal pretender to the Kingdom of Naples.

== Early life and ancestry ==
Born at Vitré, Ille-et-Vilaine, into an old French House of Laval, she was the daughter of Guy XVI de Laval, count of Laval, and Charlotte of Aragon, Princess of Taranto, herself an heiress of the royal House of Trastámara.

== Biography ==
She was the only child of Charlotte to marry and leave heirs, thereby continuing the line of descent of Frederick of Naples. On 23 January 1521 she married François de la Trémoïlle, vicomte de Thouars.

The marriage not only brought the La Trémoïlles the countship of Laval and the Neapolitan claim in 1521, but also the rank of princes étrangers at the French court. It is also said that she inherited the barony of Laz, as well, although Père Anselme's genealogy of her family makes no mention of it.

Her eldest son, Louis III de La Trémoille, became the first duc de Thouars in 1599, while her second son, Georges, and third son, Claude, founded the cadet branches of the marquises de Royan and the ducs de Noirmoutier, respectively.

== Death ==
Anne died in November 1553 in Craon, Mayenne, Kingdom of France, at the age of 48. She was buried in Église Saint-Nicolas in Craon.

== Ancestry ==
Ancestors of Anne de Laval, Viscountess of Thouars

16. Jean de Montfort (Guy XIII)
8. Guy XIV de Laval
17. Anne de Laval
4. Jean de Laval
18. John VI, Duke of Brittany
9. Isabella of Brittany
19. Joan of France
2. Guy XVI de Laval
20. Geoffroy III du Perier de St. Quentin
10. Tristan du Perrier de St. Quentin
21. Plesou di Quintin or Isabelle de la Motte
5. Jeanne du Perrier
22. Guillaume de Montauban
11. Isabeau de Montauban
23. Bona Visconti
1. Anne de Laval
24. Alfonso V of Aragon
12. Ferdinand I of Naples
25. Giraldona Carlino
6. Frederick of Naples
26. Tristan de Clermont, Count of Copertino
13. Isabella of Clermont
27. Caterina del Balzo Orsini
3. Charlotte of Naples
28. Louis, Duke of Savoy
14. Amadeus IX, Duke of Savoy
29. Anne of Cyprus
7. Anne of Savoy
30. Charles VII of France
15. Yolande of Valois
31. Marie of Anjou
