= Charlotte of Naples =

Princess of Naples (1480 - 1506)

- Born: c. 1480
- Died: 1506
- Spouse: Guy XVI, Count of Laval
- Issue: Anne de Laval
- House: Trastámara
- Father: Frederick of Naples
- Mother: Anne of Savoy

Charlotte of Naples (c. 1480 – 1506), also known as Charlotte of Aragon and Princess of Taranto, was the eldest daughter and eventual heiress of King Frederick of Naples. Although her father was dispossessed of his kingdom, her descendants, the House of La Trémoïlle maintained their dynastic claim in exile.

Daughter of the Neapolitan king's first marriage to Anne of Savoy, a granddaughter of Charles VII of France, Charlotte was married to Guy XVI, Count of Laval, head of one of Brittany's most powerful noble families.

== Marriage ==
Following her mother's death which occurred shortly after her birth, Charlotte was raised in France and brought up at the French court. One of her suitors was Cesare Borgia. Charlotte refused him, and instead on 10 June 1500 married Guy XVI de Laval, Count of Laval.

Charlotte and Guy had:

- Catherine, married Claude I of Rieux
- Anne, married François de la Trémoïlle
- François, d.1522

== Claim to kingdom of Naples ==
In the year following Charlotte's marriage, her father lost his throne and freedom to France in war. Her brother, Ferdinand of Aragón, Duke of Calabria, fled to Spain in 1504, whence he did not return. On his death without legitimate descendants in Valencia in 1550, Charlotte was long dead and France had lost the crown of Naples to another branch of the Aragonese dynasty. Nonetheless her issue took up the fruitless pretence to the crown, while pursuing their interests in Brittany and France. Charlotte is posthumously attributed the title, Princess of Taranto, which had been borne by Neapolitan heirs apparent.

== Sources ==
- Walsby, Malcolm (2007). The Counts of Laval. Ashgate Publishing Company. ISBN 9780754658115.

Charlotte of Naples House of Trastámara Cadet branch of the House of Ivrea Born: c. 1479/1480 Died: 1506
Titles in pretence
Preceded by Yolande Louise of Savoy	— TITULAR — Queen of Jerusalem, Cyprus, and Armenia; 1499 – 1506	Succeeded by Anne de Laval
Preceded by Frederick of Naples	— TITULAR — Queen of Naples; 9 November 1504 – 1506	Succeeded by Anne de Laval
