= Louis de La Trémoille, 1st Duke of Thouars =

French nobleman

Louis de La Trémoille
- 1st Duke of Thouars
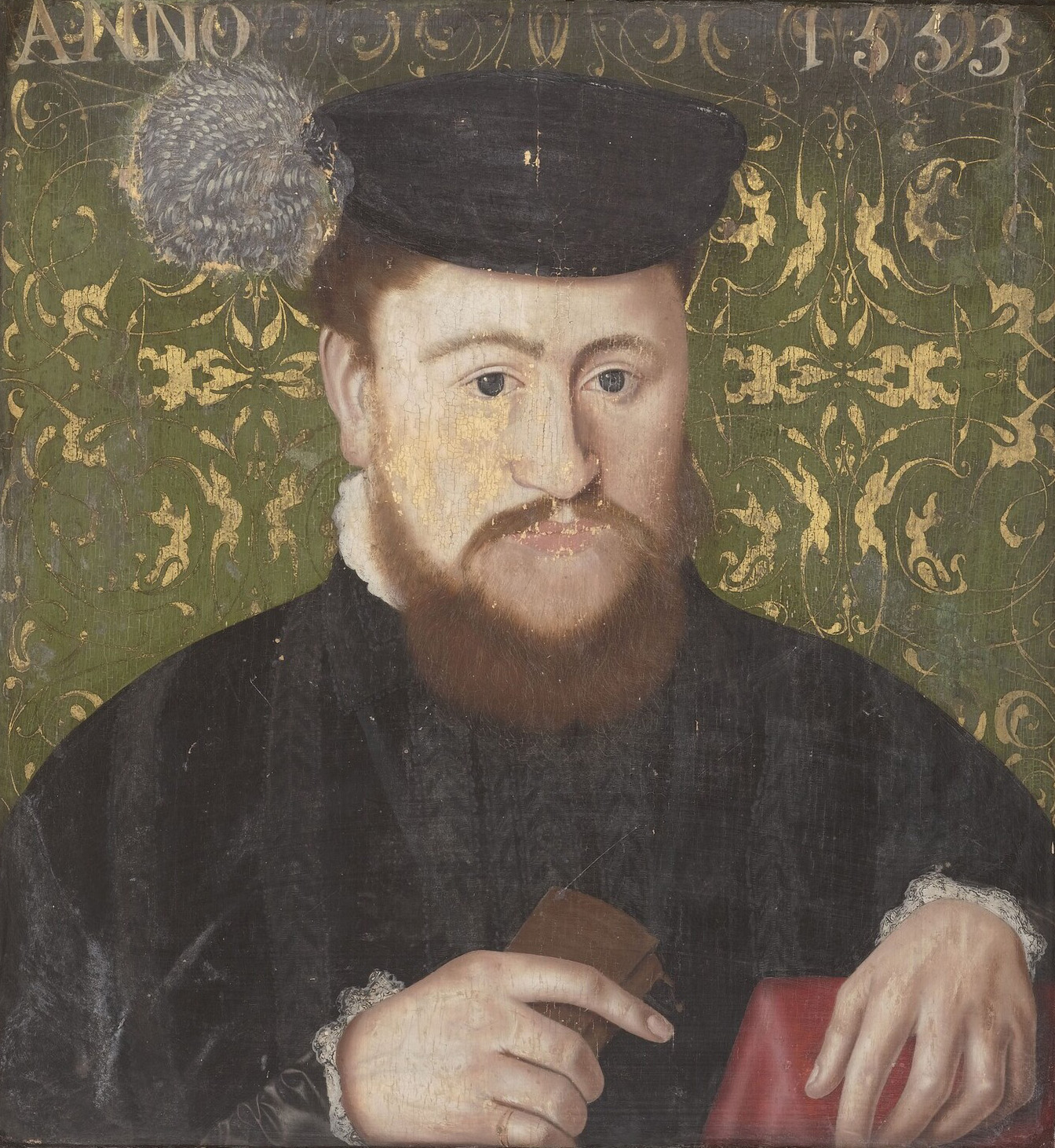
- Louis de La Trémoille
- Born: 1521
- Died: 25 March 1577 (aged 55–56); Melle
- Noble family: La Tremoille
- Spouse: Jeanne de Montmorency
- Issue: Louis, Count of Benon; Claude, 2nd Duke of Thouars; Charlotte Catherine, Princess of Condé
- Father: François II de La Trémoille
- Mother: Anne de Laval

Louis de La Trémoille, 1st Duke of Thouars (1521 – 25 March 1577) was a sixteenth-century French nobleman of the La Tremoille family. He was the son of François II de La Trémoille and his wife, Anne de Laval. Louis accompanied the dauphin on a voyage to Perpignan in 1542, served in the war against the English in Picardy and was one of the four barons given as a hostage of the Holy Ampoule at the consecration of Henry II, and one of the hostages of the peace treaty concluded in 1542 between France and England. In 1563 his title was raised to a dukedom.

In 1549, he married Jeanne de Montmorency (1528–1596), the second daughter of Anne de Montmorency. They had five children, including:

1. Louis de La Trémoille, Count of Benon,
2. Claude de La Trémoille, 2nd Duke of Thouars, married Charlotte of Nassau
3. Charlotte Catherine de La Trémoille (1568–1629), who married Henri I de Bourbon, prince de Condé.

Louis served in Italy under Marshal de Cossé. In 1560, he was a lieutenant general of Poitou and of Saintonge. He was charged, in 1567, with the command of the Loire Valley, served under the Duke of Anjou and was killed at the siege of Melle on 25 March 1577, at the moment when the city fell.

== Sources ==
- Bardet, Jean-Pierre; Dinet, Dominique; Poussou, Jean-Pierre; Vignal, Marie Catherine, eds. (2000). état et société en France aux XVIIe et XVIIIe siècles (in French). Presses de l'Université de Paris-Sorbonne.

Louis de La Trémoille, 1st Duke of Thouars House of La Trémoille Born: 1521 Died: 25 March 1577
French nobility
New title	Duc de Thouars; July 1563 – 25 March 1577	Succeeded by Claude de La Trémoille
Titles in pretence
Preceded by Anne de Laval	— TITULAR — King of Jerusalem, Cyprus, and Armenia; 1554 – 1577	Succeeded by Claude de La Trémoille
