= Henri I, Prince of Condé =

2nd Prince of Condé (1552–1588)

Henri de Bourbon
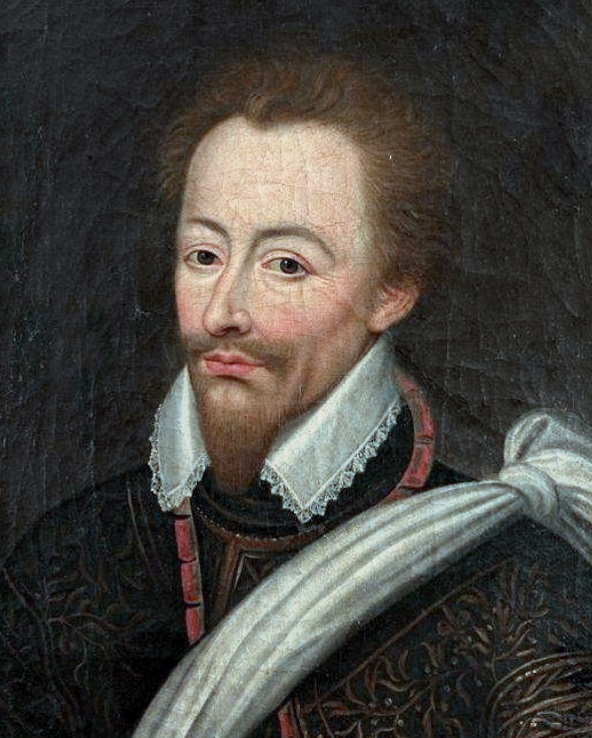

2nd Prince of Condé
- Reign: 13 March 1569 – 5 March 1588
- Predecessor: Louis I, Prince of Condé
- Successor: Henri II, Prince of Condé
- Born: 29 December 1552; La Ferté-sous-Jouarre, Île-de-France, France
- Died: 5 March 1588 (aged 35); Saint-Jean-d'Angély, Saintonge, France
- Spouse: Marie of Cleves; Charlotte Catherine de La Trémoille
- Issue: by Marie: Catherine, Marquise d'Isles by Charlotte Catherine: Éléonore, Princess of Orange; Henri II, Prince of Condé
- House: Bourbon-Condé
- Father: Louis I, Prince of Condé
- Mother: Eléanor de Roye
- Religion: Reformed (Huguenot)

Henri de Bourbon, 2nd Prince of Condé (29 December 1552 – 5 March 1588) was a French prince du sang and Huguenot general like his more prominent father, Louis I, Prince of Condé.

== Life ==
Henri was the eldest son of Louis de Bourbon and Eléanor de Roye, daughter and heiress of Charles de Roye, Count of Roucy. Of the eight children in his family, he and his brother François, Prince of Conti, were the only ones to have children.

Coat-of-arms of Henri I, Prince of Condé.

Following the death of his father, Louis, at the Battle of Jarnac, Jeanne d'Albret introduced Henri and her own son, Henry of Navarre, as pages to Admiral Coligny. Since both were princes of the blood, this act gave the Huguenot cause legitimacy.

At the Battle of Moncontour on 3 October 1569, Henri was wounded in the face and was forced to retreat. Attending the wedding of Henry of Navarre and the subsequent massacre of Protestants, Henri was forced to convert to Catholicism, face death or life imprisonment. In his escape from Paris, Henri was joined by Theodore Beza, who published his Du droit des magistrats sur leurs sujets in Germany.

By 1573 the Huguenot cause had made some political gains in the Midi, consequently Henri was assigned "governor general and protector". Following the Peace of Monsieur, he was restored to his governorship of Picardy. During the sixth war of religion, he commanded the forces that captured Brouage and allowed English aid for the Huguenots. And, it would be Henri, angered by Catholic resistance to his governorship of Picardy, who started the seventh war of religion by seizing the town of La Fère in November 1579.

In 1588, Henri died at Saint-Jean-d'Angély after a brief illness.

== Marriages ==
He married twice, first to his cousin, Marie of Cleves. With Marie, Henri had one child:

- Catherine (30 October 1574 – 30 December 1595), Marquise of Isles, never married.

Secondly, Henri married his second cousin once removed, Charlotte Catherine de La Tremoille (1568–1629), daughter of Louis III de La Trémoille. They had at least two children:

- Éléonore de Bourbon (1587–1619), married in 1606 to Philip William, Prince of Orange.
- Henri II, Prince of Condé (1588–1646)

== Sources ==
- Knecht, R.J. (1989). The French Wars of Religion, 1559-1598. Longman.
- Knecht, R.J. (2000). The French Civil Wars. Pearson Education Limited.

Henri I, Prince of Condé House of Bourbon-Condé Cadet branch of the House of Bourbon Born: 29 December 1552 Died: 5 March 1588
French nobility
Preceded by Louis I de Bourbon	Prince of Condé; 13 March 1569 – 5 March 1588	Succeeded by Henri II de Bourbon
