= Château de Vallery =

Coordinates: 48°14′29″N 3°3′2″E

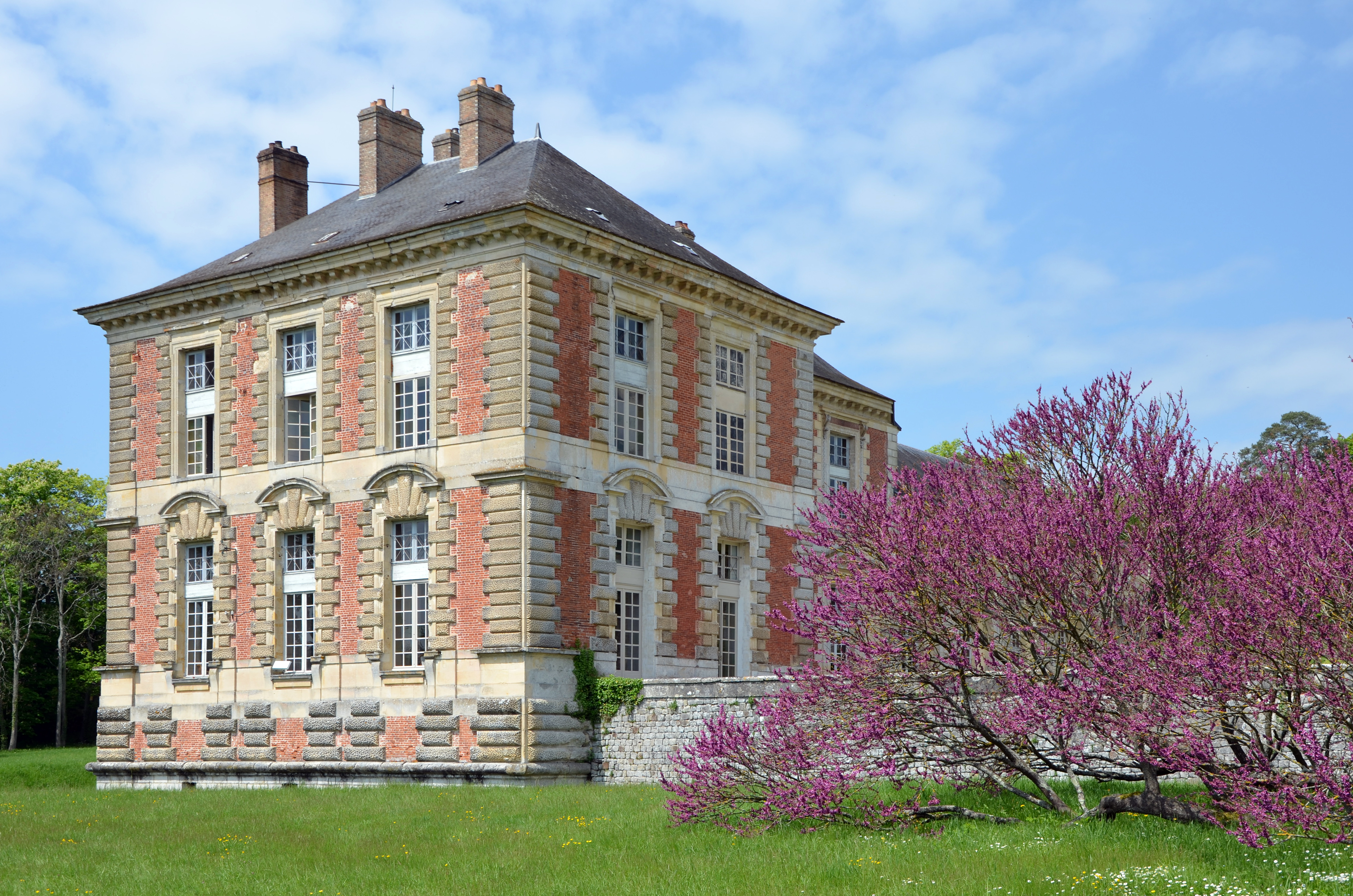
- Castle of Vallery, Yonne, France.
- Interactive map of Château de Vallery
- Location: Vallery, Yonne, France

History
- Built: 1548–1562

Site notes
- Architect: Pierre Lescot
- Architectural style: French Renaissance
- Governing body: Privately owned (Patrice Vansteenberghe)

Monument historique
- Designated: 1946 (gardens), 2001 (château)
- Reference no.: PA00113922

The Château de Vallery is a Renaissance château in the commune of Vallery, in the Yonne department of Burgundy, France. Begun in 1548 for Jacques d'Albon de Saint-André, Marshal of France and a favourite of King Henry II, it was built by the royal architect Pierre Lescot on the site of a medieval fortress, of which the curtain walls, circular towers and cellars survive. Construction was left unfinished at Saint-André's death in 1562; only the west wing, the south wing and a corner pavilion were built.

In 1564 the estate passed to Louis I de Bourbon, Prince of Condé, and it remained a residence of the House of Condé until 1747, becoming a centre of Protestantism and the burial place of the Condé princes. From 1727 the estate belonged to Élisabeth Alexandrine de Bourbon-Condé, who demolished the south wing, and it was later held by the family of the Marquis de Sade.

Following demolitions and alterations in the 18th and 19th centuries and a period of decay in the 20th century, the château survives as one of the earliest examples of French Renaissance architecture, its design closely related to Lescot's contemporaneous work on the Louvre Palace. Its Renaissance gardens and orchard were listed as a monument historique in 1946, and the château and its dependencies in 2001.

== History ==
=== Medieval origins ===
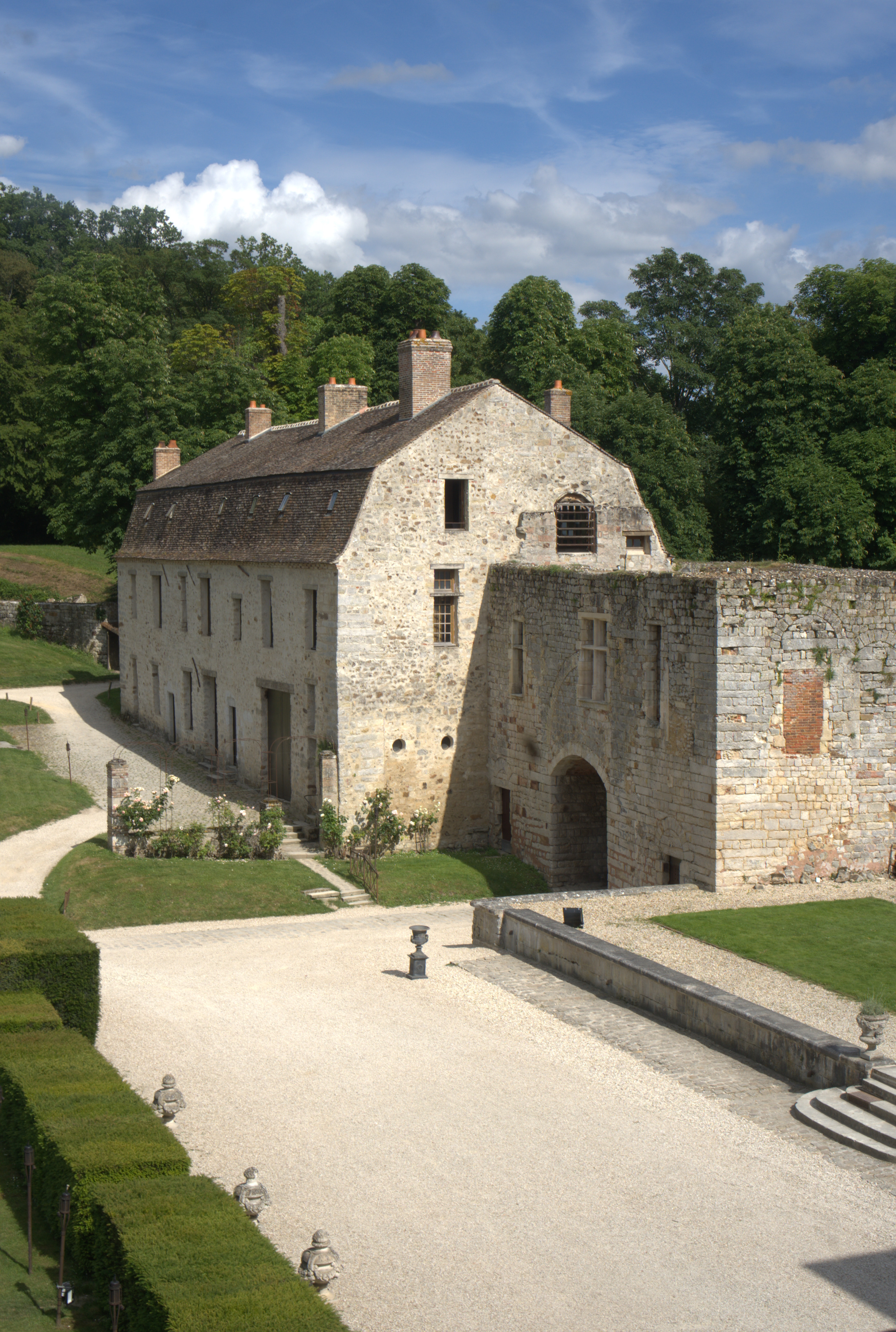
The surviving medieval château

In the 12th century the site was probably a principal seat of the viscounts of Sens. The lordship passed by inheritance and marriage through the lords of Vallery in the 13th century, among them the soldier Érard de Vallery, then the Thianges family from about 1277 and the Poisieu family in the 15th century, until Jacques de Poisieu sold Vallery to Jacques d'Albon de Saint-André in 1548. Circular towers, curtain walls, cellars and a 14th-century gatehouse survive from the medieval fortifications.

=== Renaissance construction (1548–1562) ===
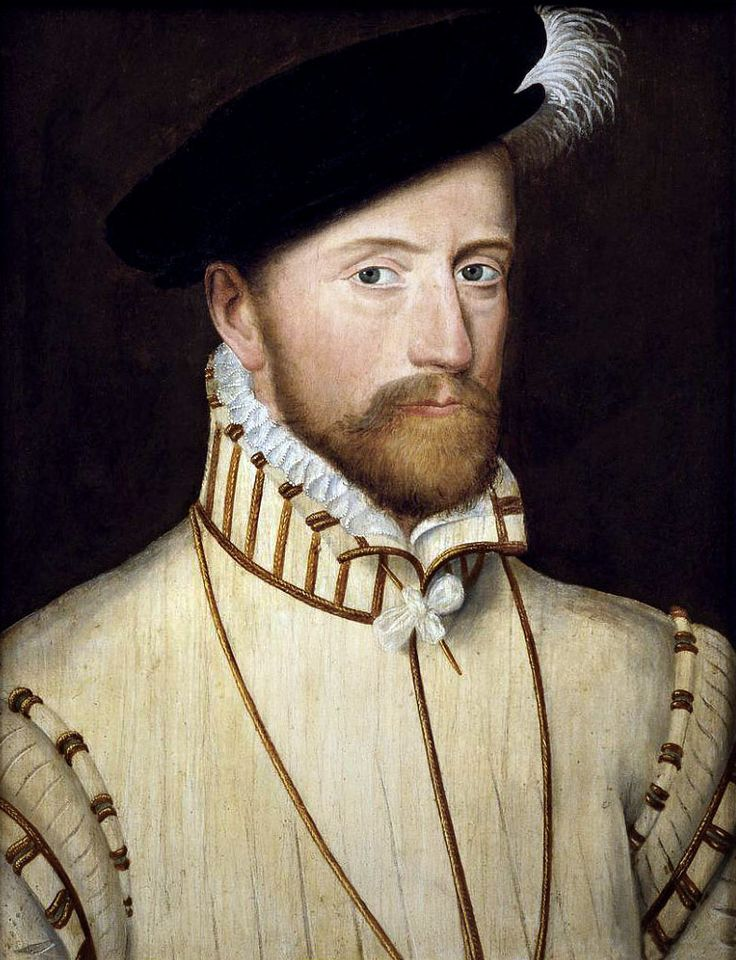
Jacques d'Albon de Saint-André, who bought Vallery in 1548

On 16 April 1548 the estate was bought by Jacques d'Albon de Saint-André, Marshal of France and a favourite of King Henry II, for 95,000 livres. He commissioned the king's architect Pierre Lescot, who was then working on the new Louvre, to build a new residence on the site of the old fortress, with the works carried out by Léonard Fontaine, master of the king's works, and the master mason Guillaume Marchant. The design comprised two perpendicular ranges joined by a corner pavilion, the south range built against the 14th-century gatehouse.

Henry II and his court stayed at Vallery from 18 to 21 March 1550, when sumptuous festivities were held, though the court lodged in the old château, since the new ranges had not yet been begun. Building contracts show the south wing was started only after 1555, following the west range and the corner pavilion; Francesco Primaticcio is documented at Vallery in 1555, probably as an expert. The king returned in 1556 and his son Francis II visited in 1559. The façades, today of brick with stone quoins, were originally faced with red and black marble. The work was unfinished when Saint-André was killed in battle in 1562, and the carpentry was still incomplete in 1563.

=== The Condé era (1564–1747) ===
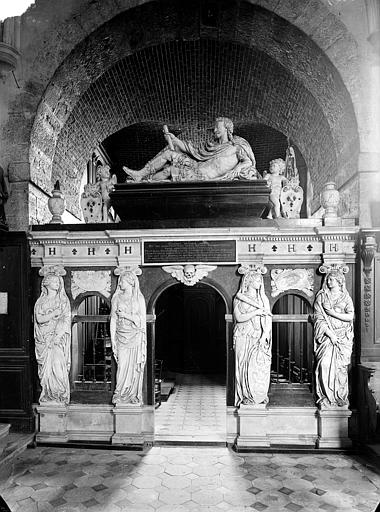
The marble tomb of Henry II de Bourbon, sculpted by Gilles Guérin (1646), in the church at Vallery

In 1564 Saint-André's widow, Marguerite de Lustrac, gave Vallery to Louis I de Bourbon, Prince of Condé, a leader of the Huguenots, and the château remained in the House of Bourbon-Condé for nearly two centuries. The estate became the burial place of several princes and princesses of Condé, who were interred in the parish church of Saint-Thomas of Canterbury, a short distance from the château, built in 1614 at the wish of Henry II de Bourbon. There the Grand Condé commissioned the sculptor Gilles Guérin to make the marble tomb of his father, Henry II de Bourbon in which the prince is shown reclining in the manner of a Renaissance gisant above four caryatids representing the cardinal virtues. The church was restored by Eugène Viollet-le-Duc in 1854.

In 1609 Henry II de Bourbon married Charlotte de Montmorency, a marriage encouraged by King Henry IV, who was himself enamoured of her. Condé withdrew with his wife to Vallery and declined repeated invitations to court; when the king's pursuit continued, the couple fled to Brussels. The king's plans to recover Charlotte were ended by his assassination in 1610. Condé later led the opposition of the nobility to the regency of Marie de' Medici, and was imprisoned at Vincennes from 1616 until his release in 1619.

The estate passed by inheritance until it came to Élisabeth Alexandrine de Bourbon-Condé, known as Mademoiselle de Sens, the last of the Condé to hold it.

=== Decline and restoration ===
Mademoiselle de Sens had the south wing demolished, and on 12 November 1747 she sold Vallery to Jacques-René Cordier de Launay, seigneur de La Verrière. His granddaughter, Renée-Pélagie Cordier de Launay de Montreuil, wife of the Marquis de Sade, lived at Vallery for a time with her husband. The Launay family sold the château on 30 March 1822 to General Louis-Marie Lévesque de la Ferrière, who became mayor of Vallery and was buried there in 1834.

In the early 19th century Charles-Michel Cordier carried out severe alterations that hastened the building's decline, demolishing the northern part of the west wing, lowering the gallery, and removing the upper storey and attic of the corner pavilion; the roofs were rebuilt lower and the façades completed with pastiches, and the gallery was later partitioned. The château was left to deteriorate through the 20th century. It was bought in 1990 by the architect Patrice Vansteenberghe, who began its restoration with the guidance of the historic-monuments service; the Grande Galerie has since been returned to its original dimensions, and the château is used as a venue for weddings and events.

== Architecture ==
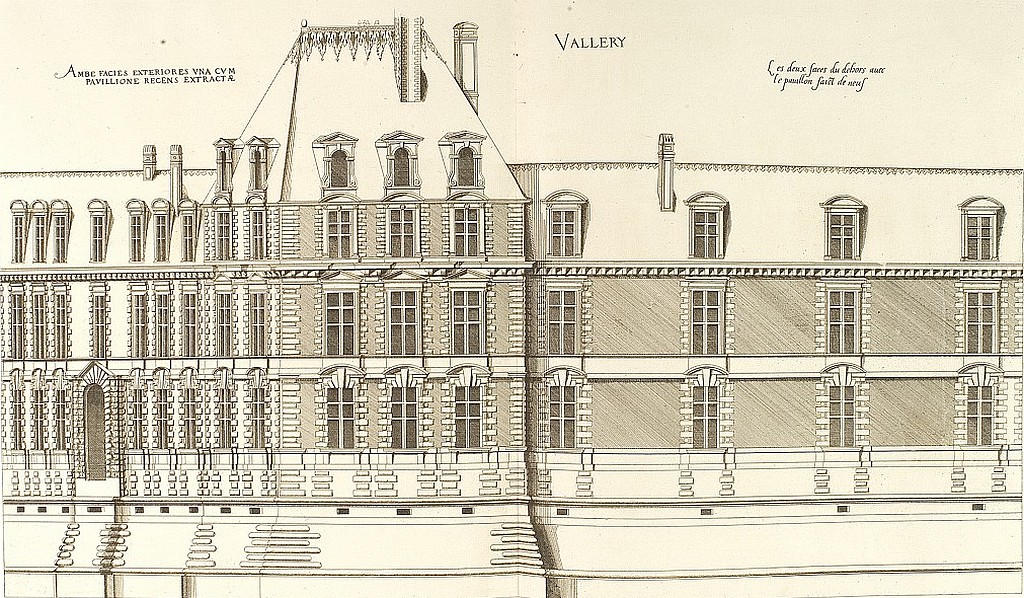
The château's exterior façades, engraved by Jacques Androuet du Cerceau (1576)

Jacques Androuet du Cerceau recorded the château in Les plus excellents bastiments de France (1576) and compared it to the contemporary Louvre, noting that the two used different materials and plans. The unfinished château consisted of two ranges meeting at a right angle, with a basement, a main storey, an upper storey and an attic lit by dormers. The moat-facing wall of the west range is of rough limestone and flint rubble; the courtyard face is of brick and stone, with a portico of hewn stone.

The portico opened onto the courtyard through five arcades, now filled with windows, under a barrel vault with lunettes. Its façade has paired Tuscan order pilasters between round-headed arcades, with mascarons carved as the heads of fauns and female fauns, and spandrels inlaid with discs of coloured marble. Sabine Frommel has studied the portico as a work of Pierre Lescot that draws on both French and Italian models, comparing it with his Louvre, the Hôtel Carnavalet and the Fontaine des Innocents.

The corner pavilion, of brick and stone, originally had a further storey and an attic under a high pavilion roof with dormers, now lost. Window openings carry curved, triangular or straight pediments according to their position; the moat-facing windows and the quoins are rusticated, and the courtyard elevations have friezes of carved volutes and marble inlay. The façades were originally faced with red and black marble. This brick-and-stone polychromy became a model for châteaux of the 17th century.

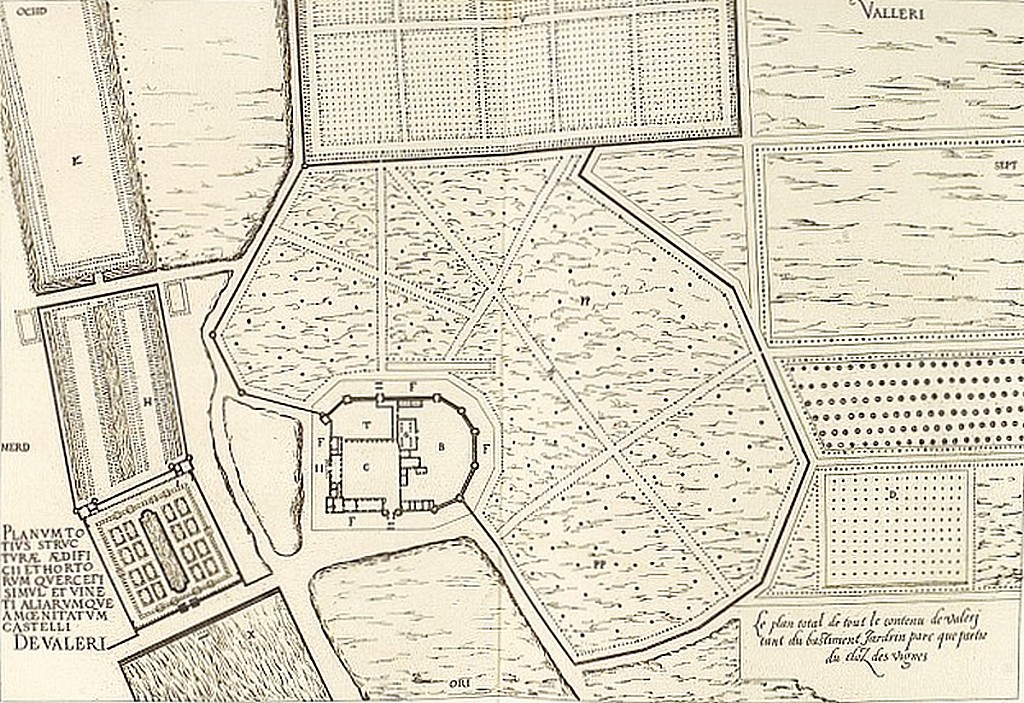
Plan of the château by du Cerceau (1576)

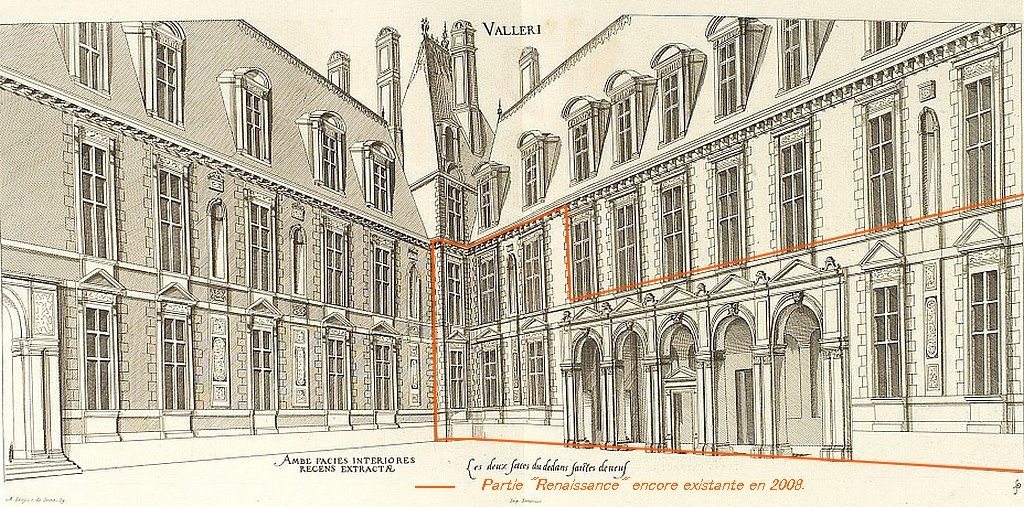
The surviving Renaissance wing

== Gardens and park ==
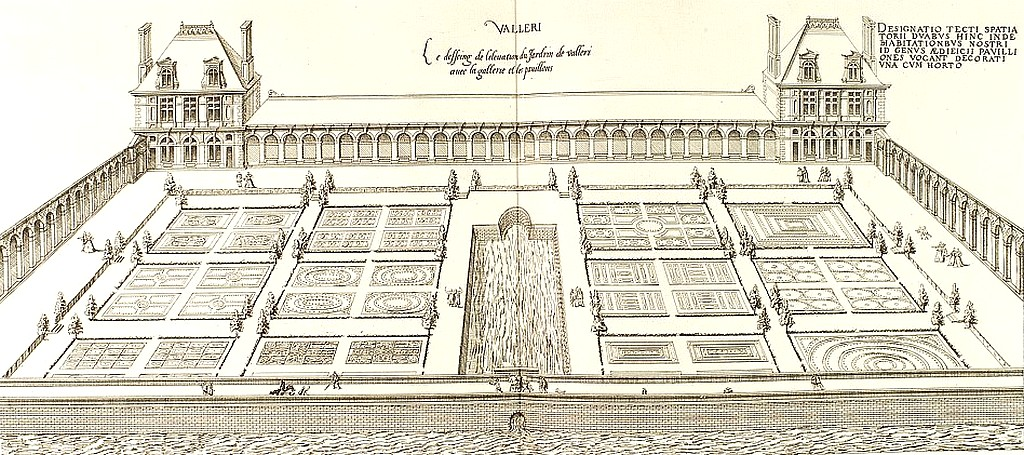
The garden, gallery and pavilions, engraved by Jacques Androuet du Cerceau (1576)

The pleasure garden was laid out for Saint-André by Pierre Lescot between 1548 and 1556, one of the earliest Renaissance gardens in France. It was walled, with a parterre of sixteen squares set on either side of a long rectangular basin, and was bordered to the east by the dyke of an artificial pond fed by the Orvanne. A grassed terrace gave access to the west, to a ground-floor portico of twenty-nine arcades flanked by two pavilions; this gallery has since disappeared, though the alder grove with its basin and canal survives. An adjoining walled enclosure of seventeen arpents was planted with vines, and the wider park held a heron aviary among its features.

The gardens were altered over the following centuries. A flood in 1626 damaged the dyke and destroyed the garden pavilion, the portico was taken down in the 17th century, and the alder grove was replaced by an orchard. The pond was filled and the pleasure garden turned to a kitchen garden, before the central basin was re-excavated in the late 18th century. The garden portico and pavilion, the dyke, the orchard, the kitchen garden, and the irrigation basin and canal were listed as monuments historiques on 12 July 1946.

=== The dovecote ===
The estate's dovecote is among the largest in France. It was built on the highest point of the site and set back from the river, with walls about 1.15 metres thick; it contains 2,844 nesting holes. Under the customary right that allowed one pair of pigeons for each arpent of land, a dovecote of this size implies an estate of more than 180 hectares.

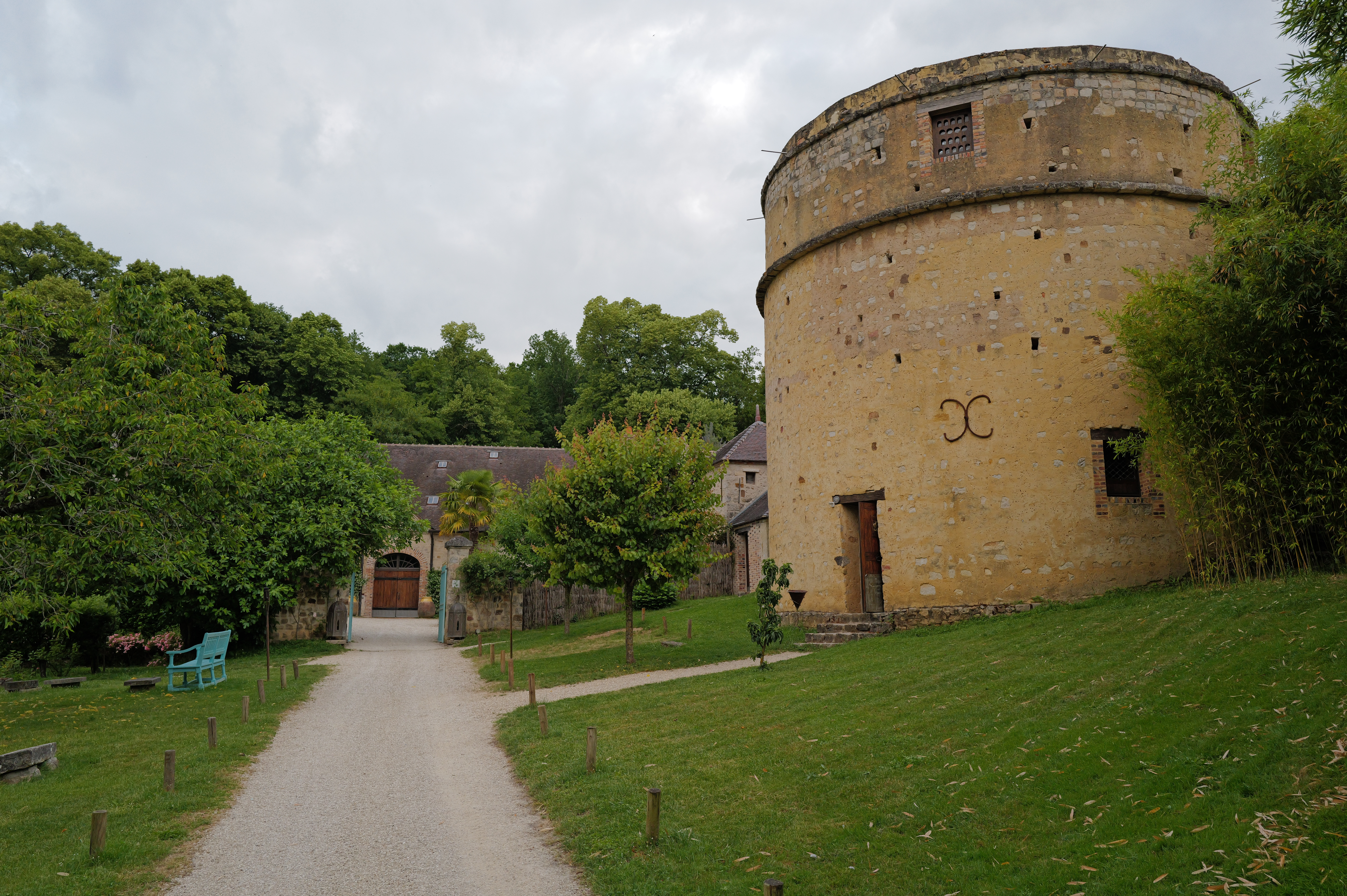
Exterior of the dovecote

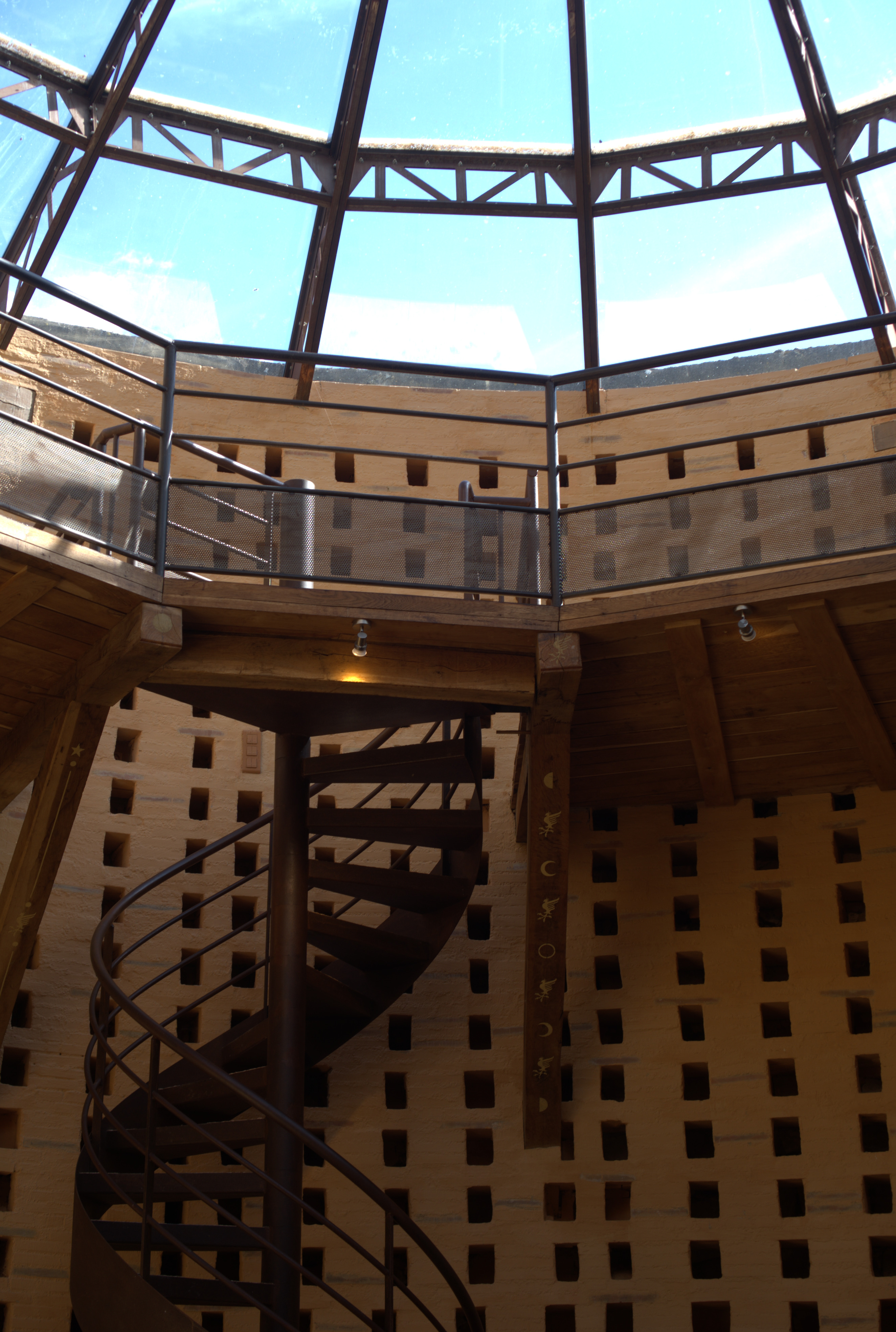
Interior of the dovecote

== Heritage protection ==
The château and its grounds are protected as a monument historique by the French Ministry of Culture. The gardens and orchard were classified by decree on 12 July 1946. The château and all its dependencies—including the belvedere, the châtelet, and the fortified enclosure with its curtain walls, towers and moats—were classified by decree on 4 October 2001, replacing an earlier protection of 1911.

== Gallery ==
The medieval château

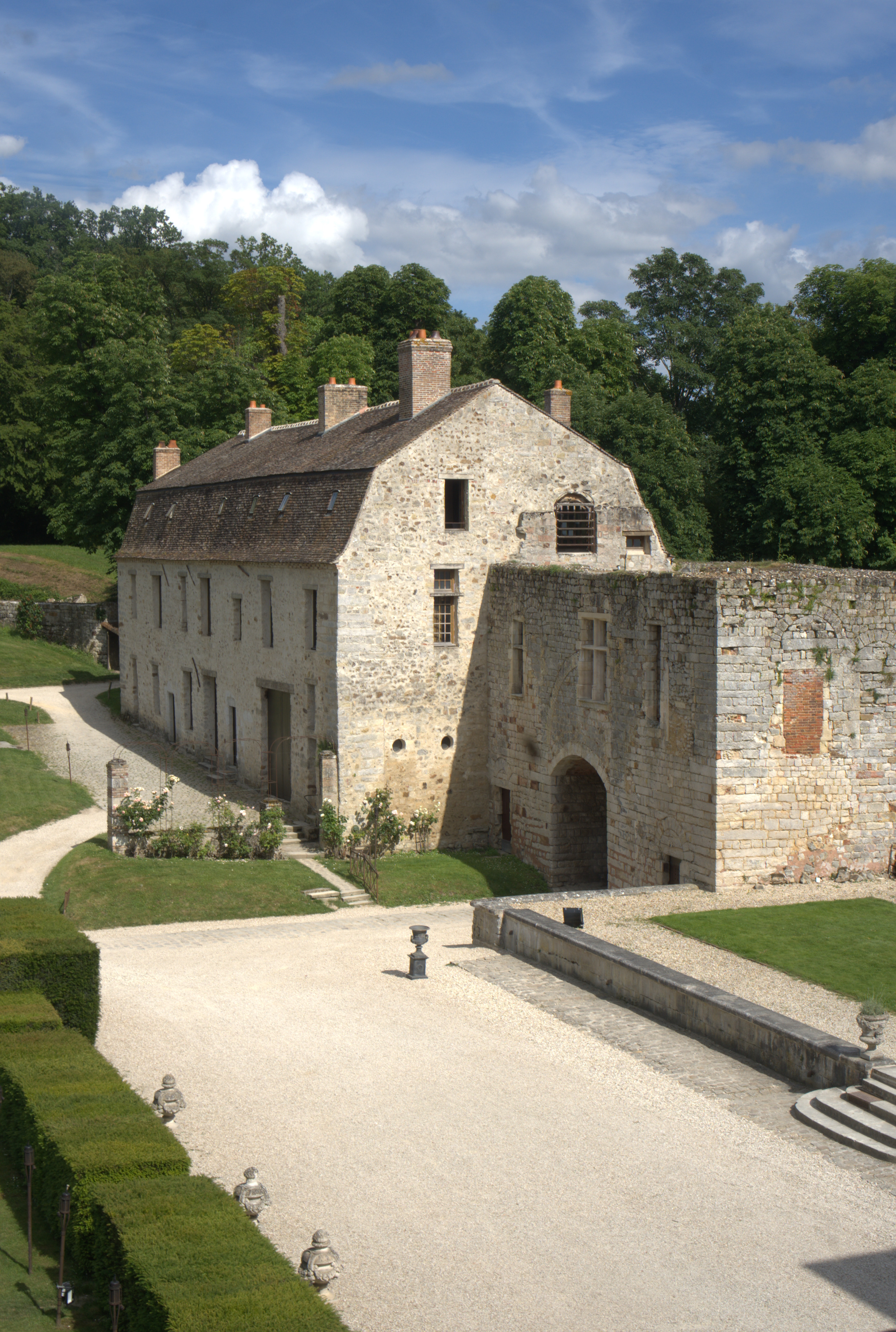
The medieval château

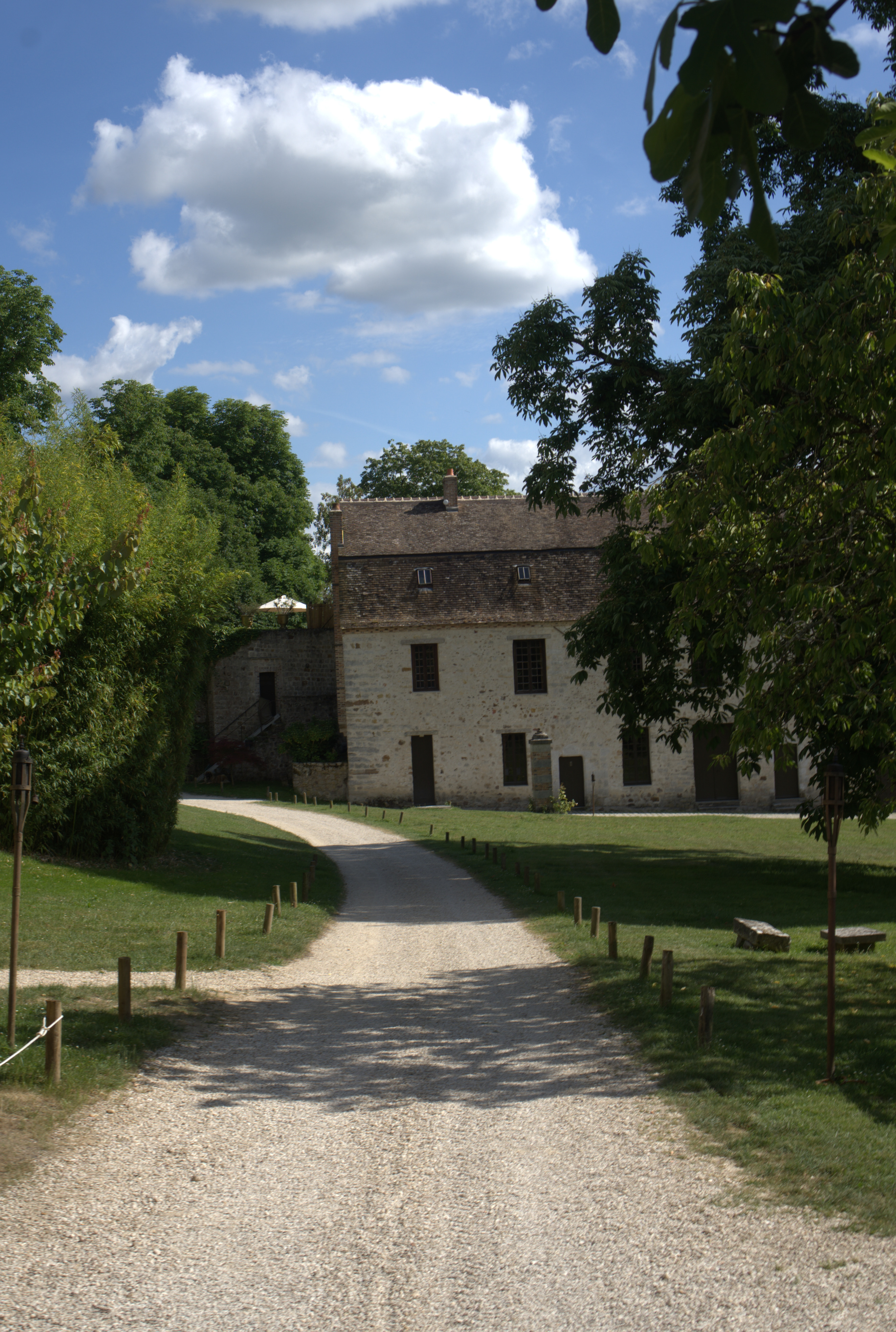
The medieval château

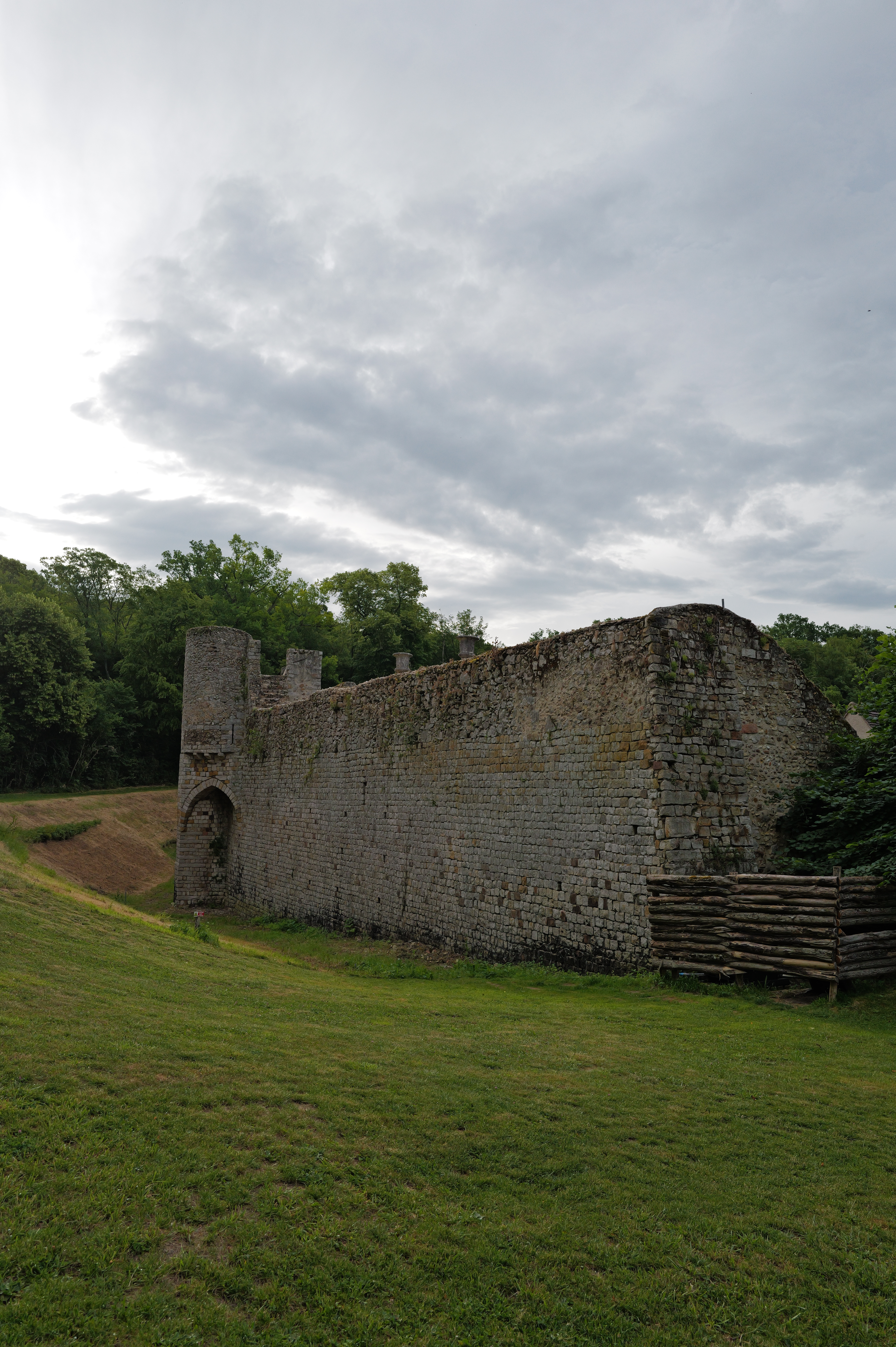
Original outer wall

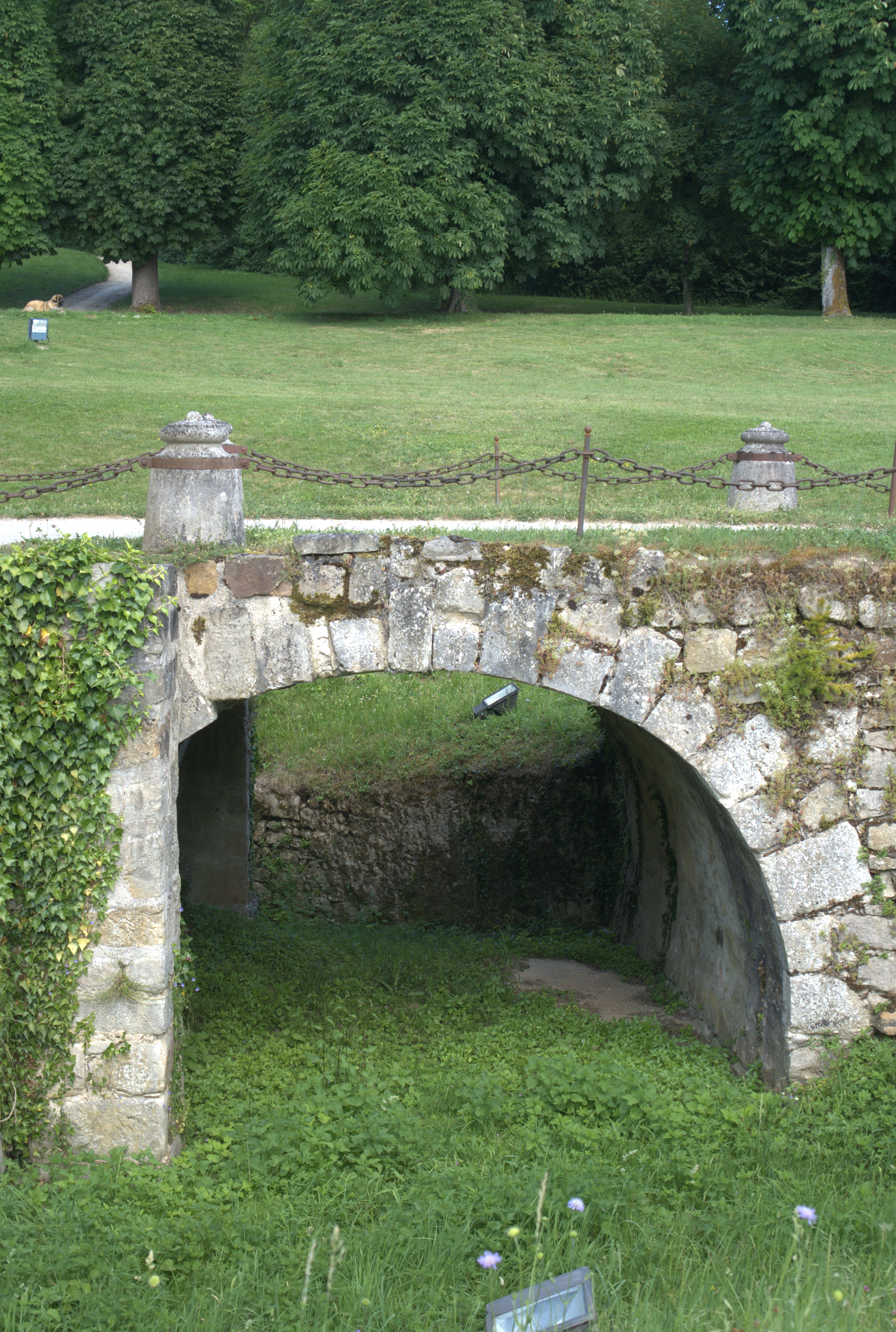
The moat

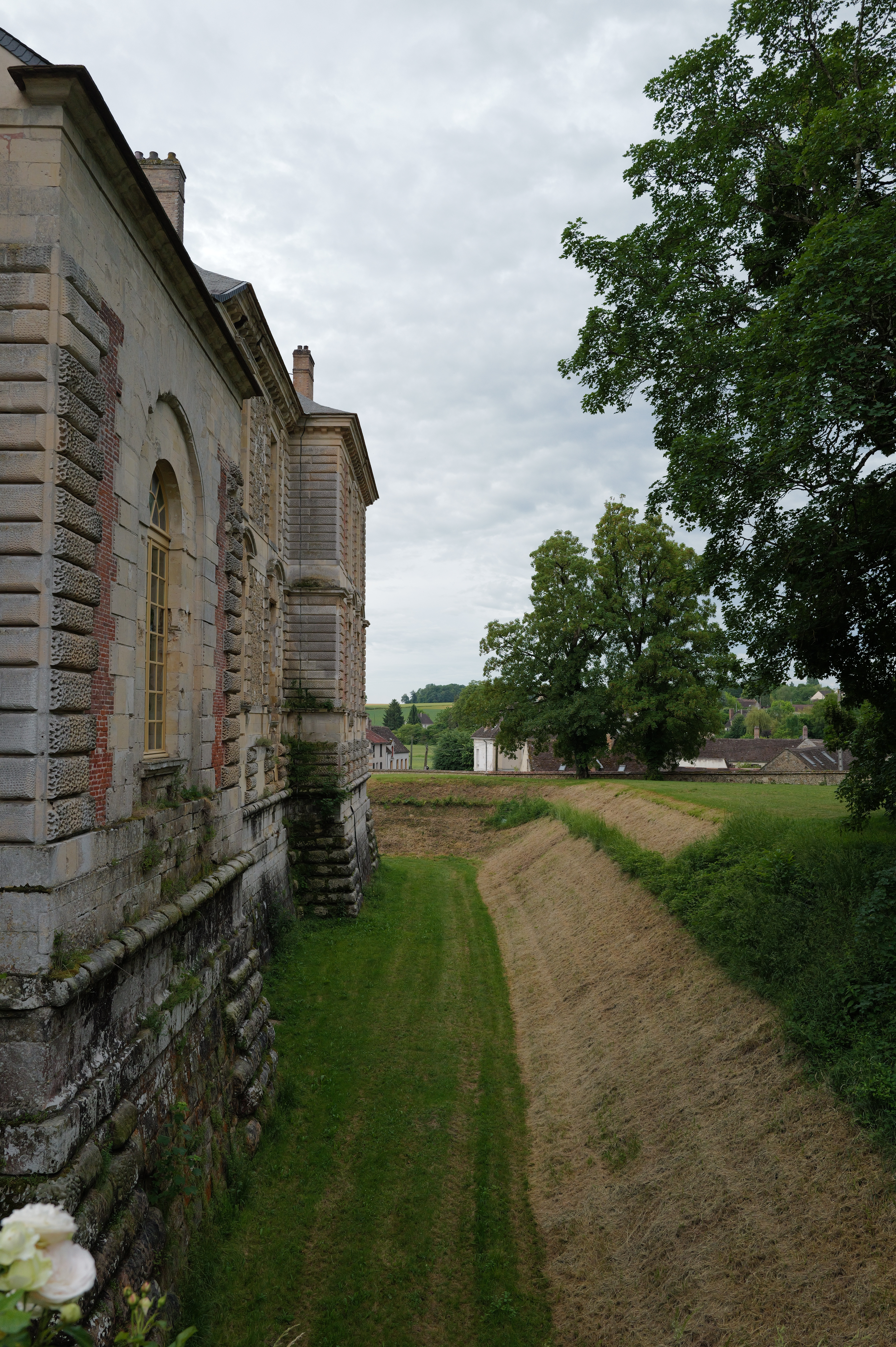
The moat

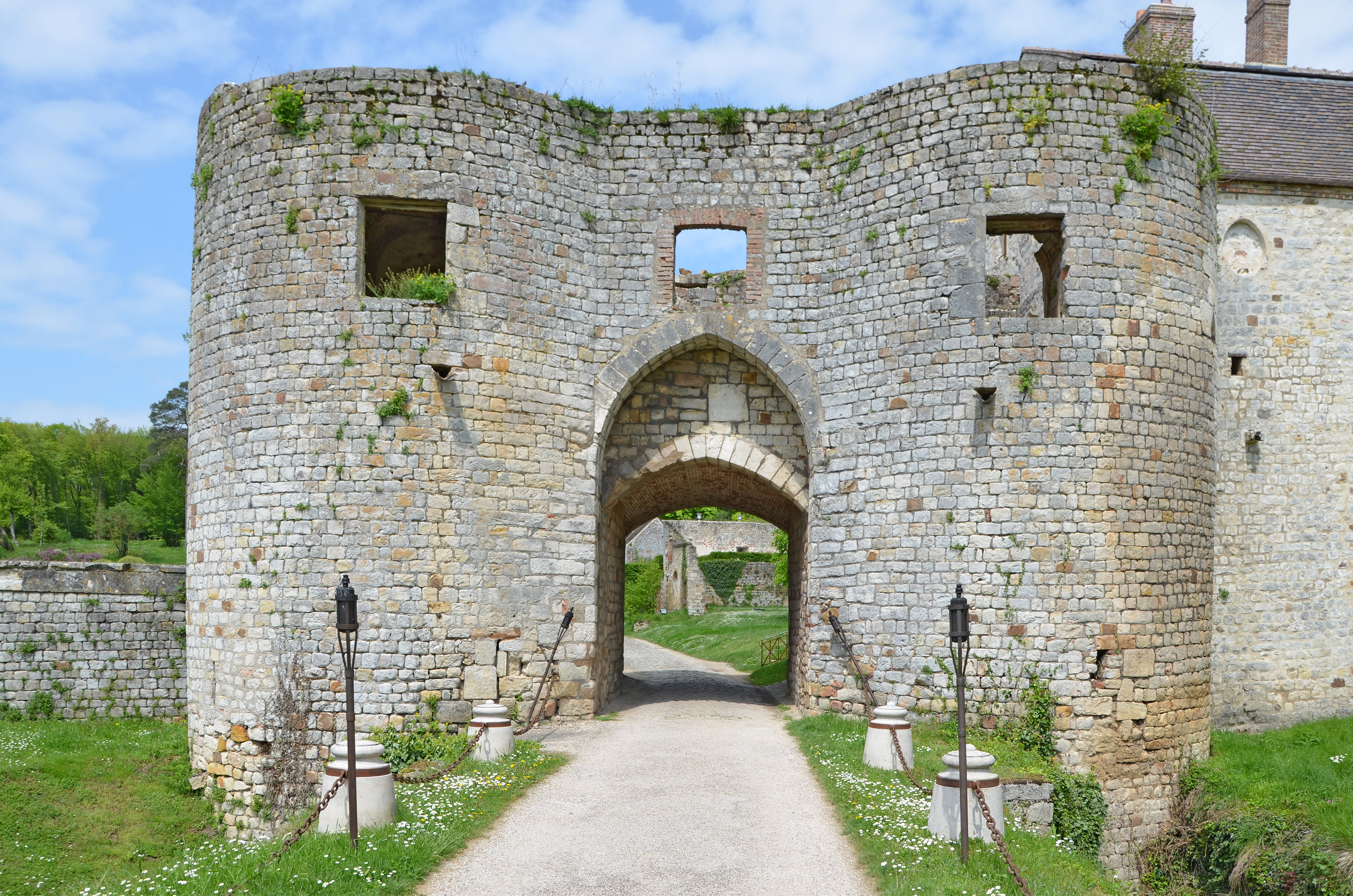
The 14th-century gate

The Renaissance château

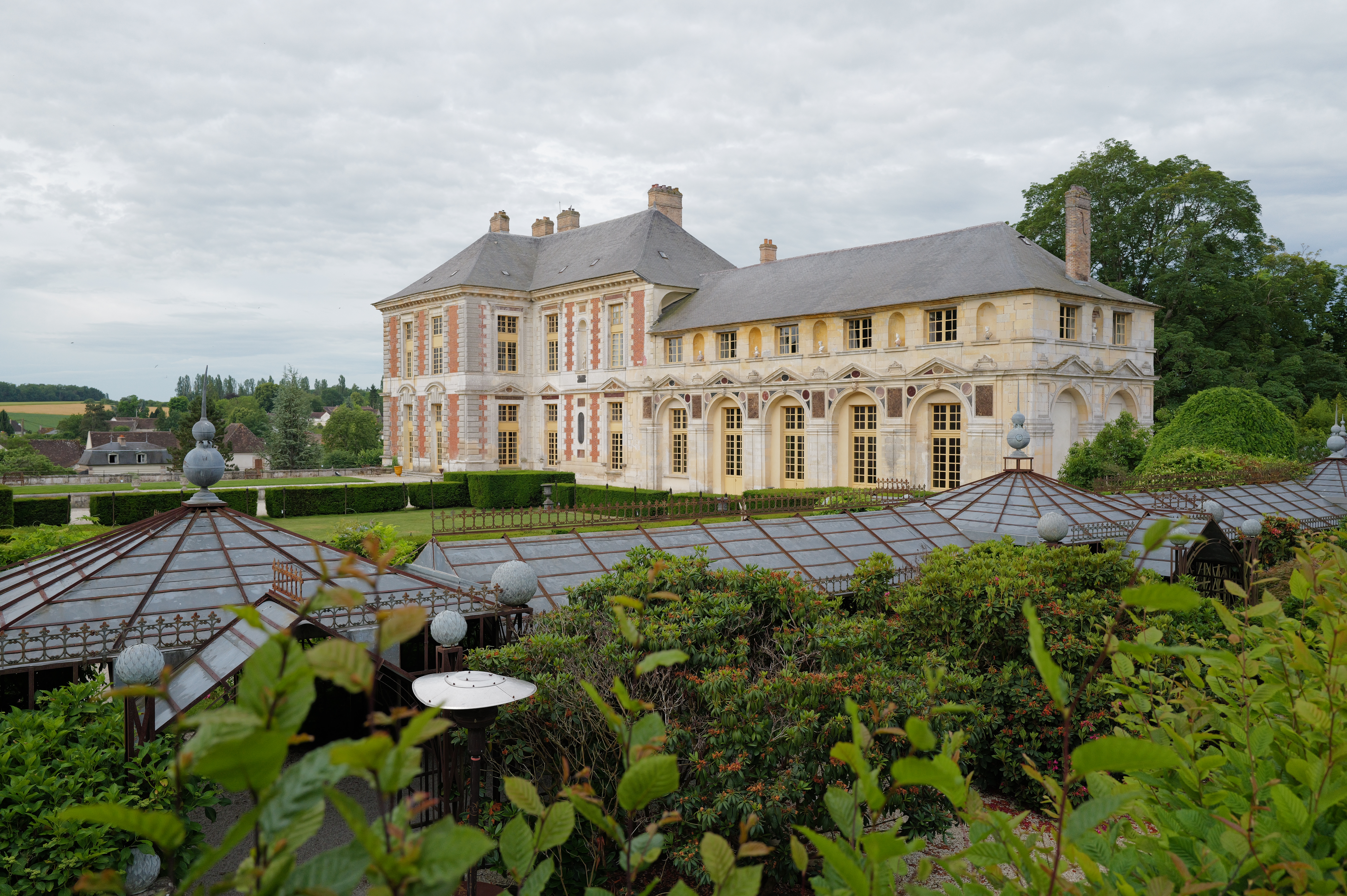
Exterior of the Renaissance wing

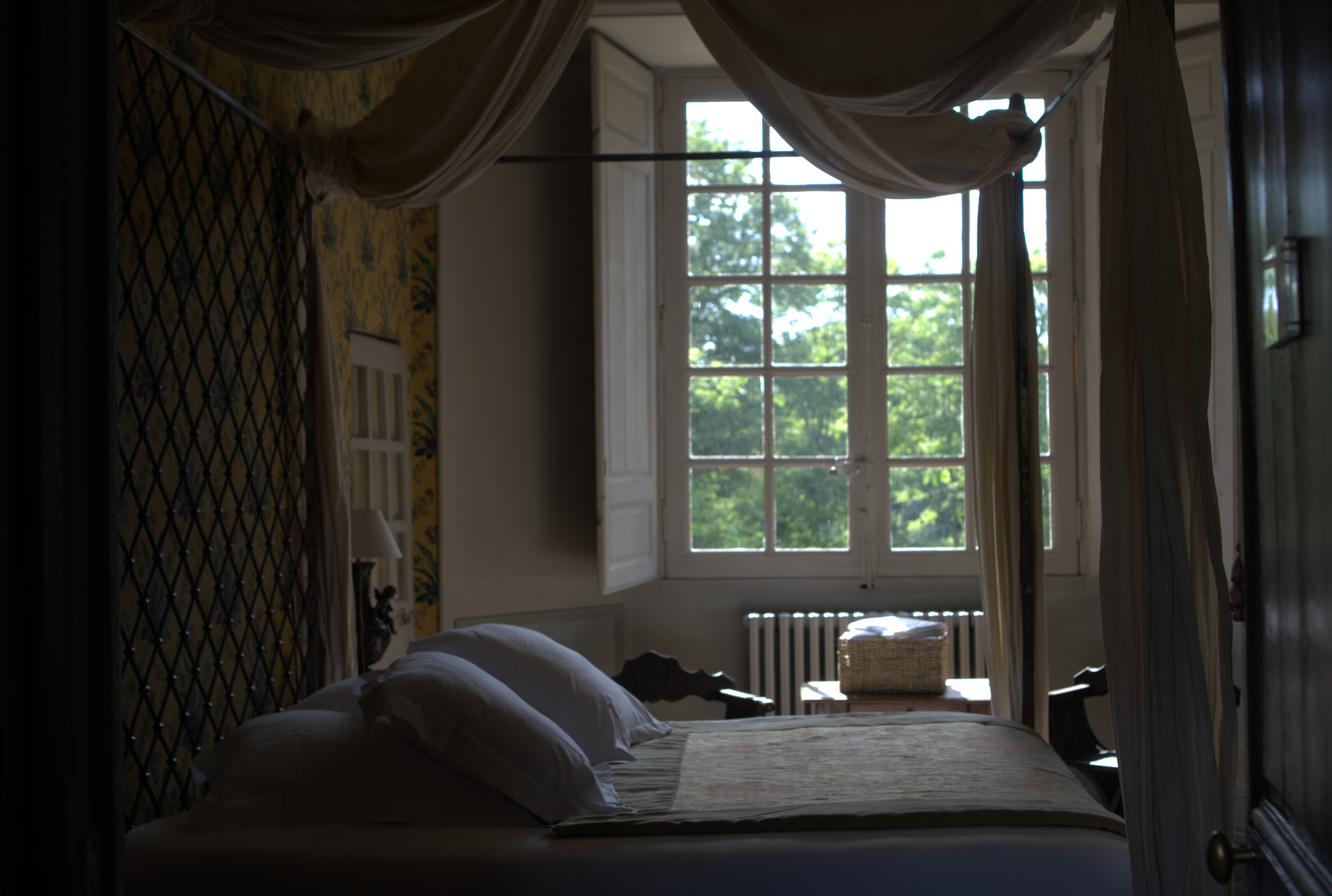
Bedroom in the Renaissance wing

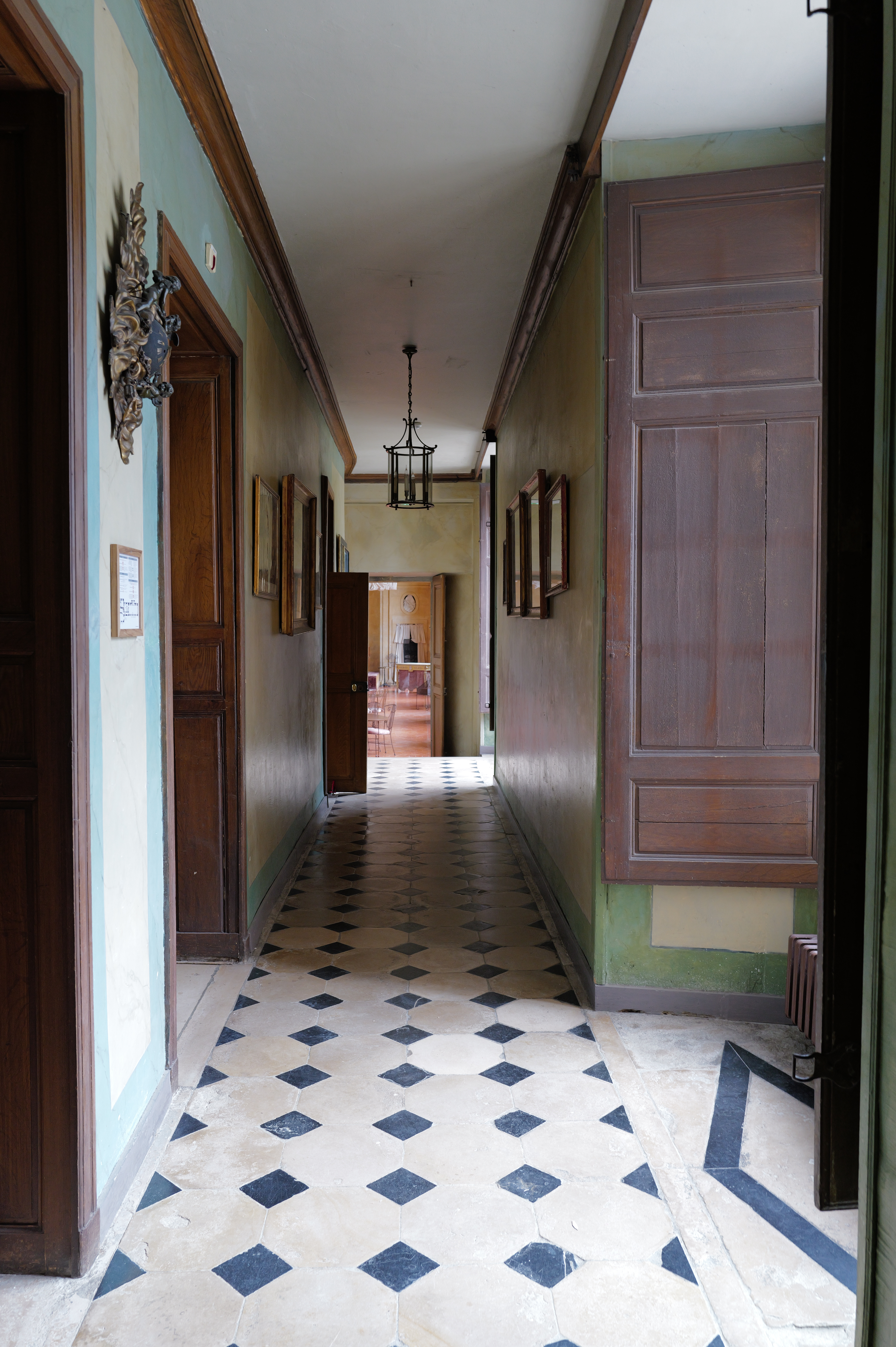
Hallway in the Renaissance wing

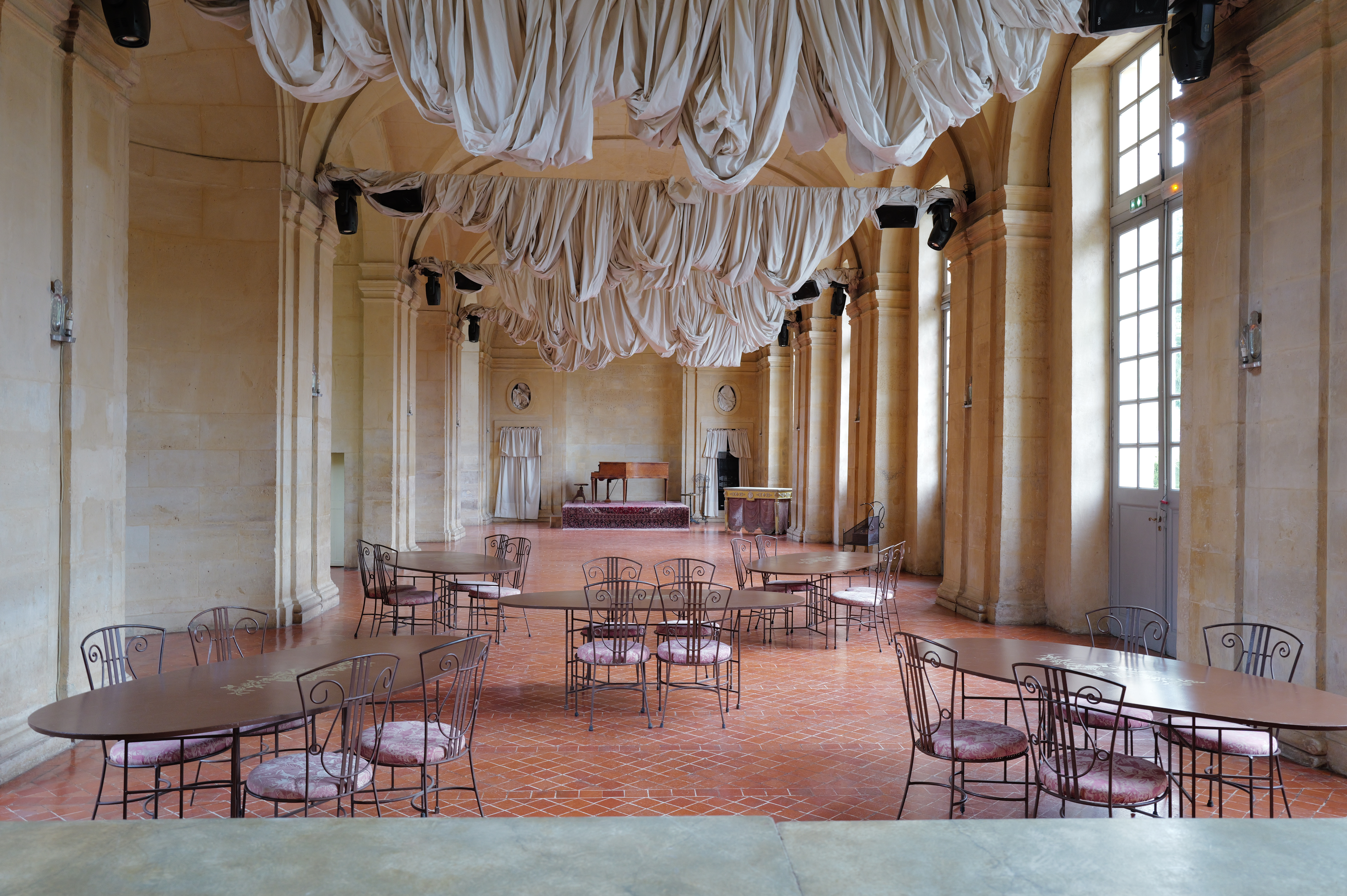
The Grande Galerie

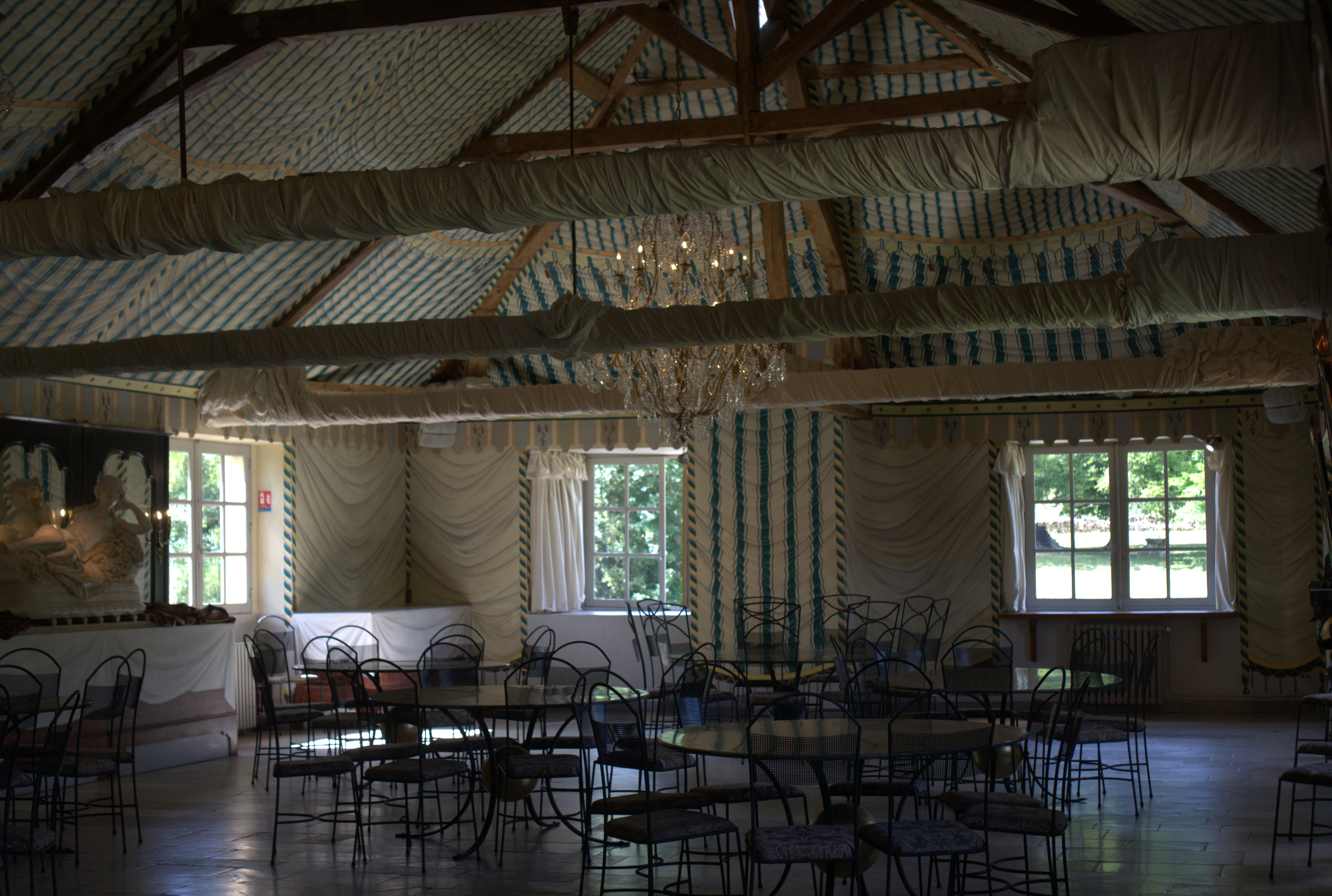
The Tapestry Room

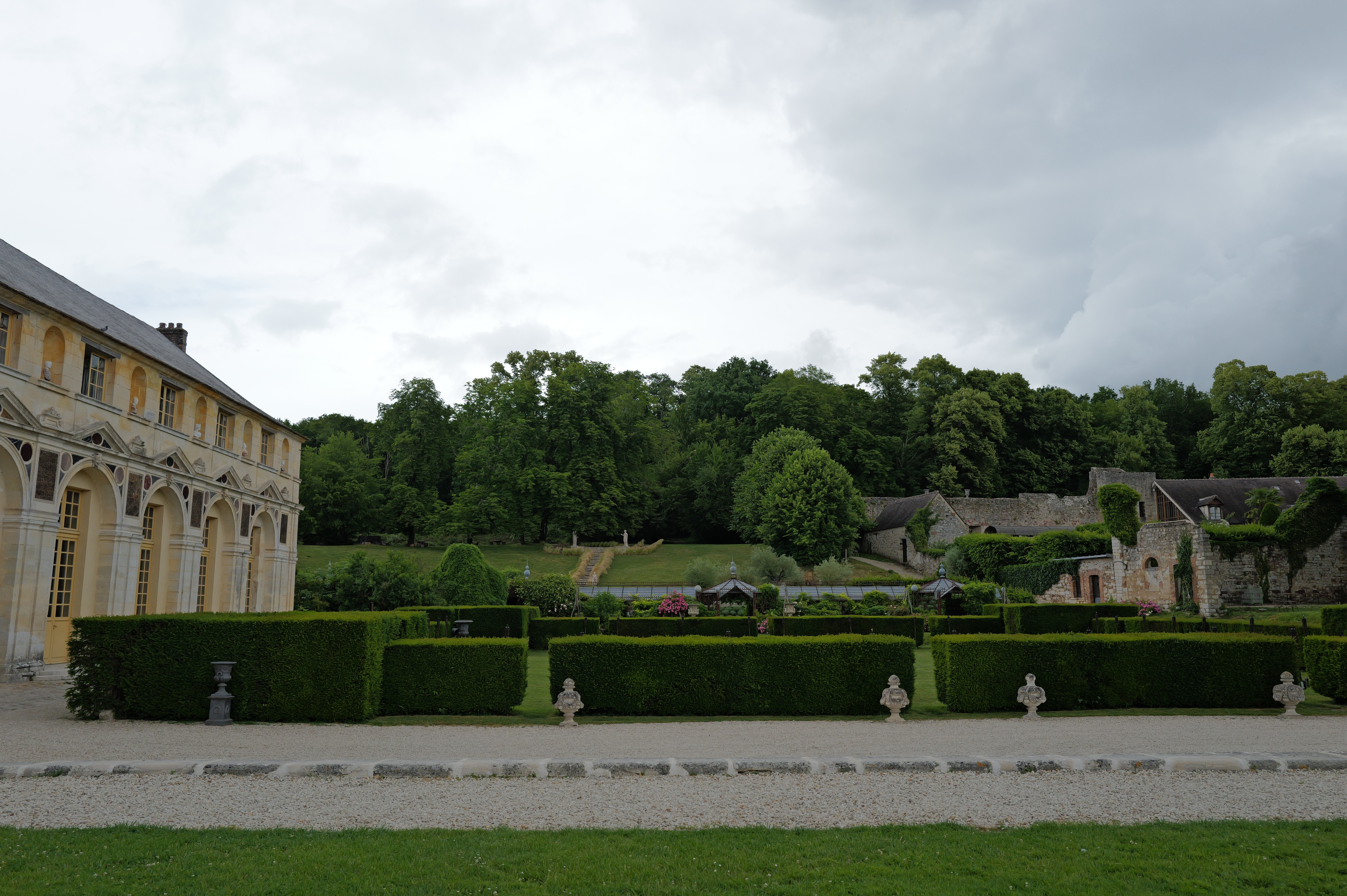
The central square

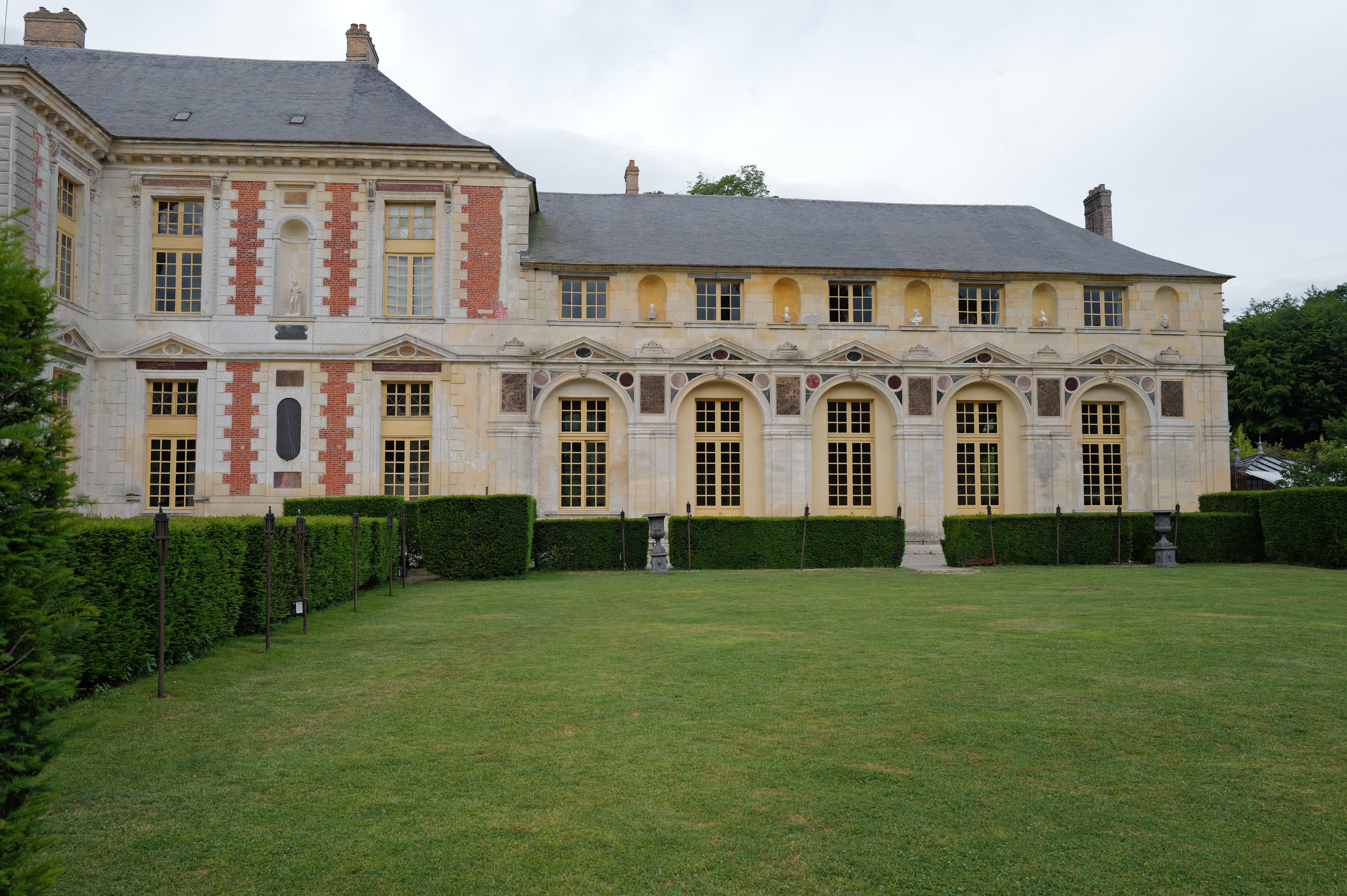
The central square

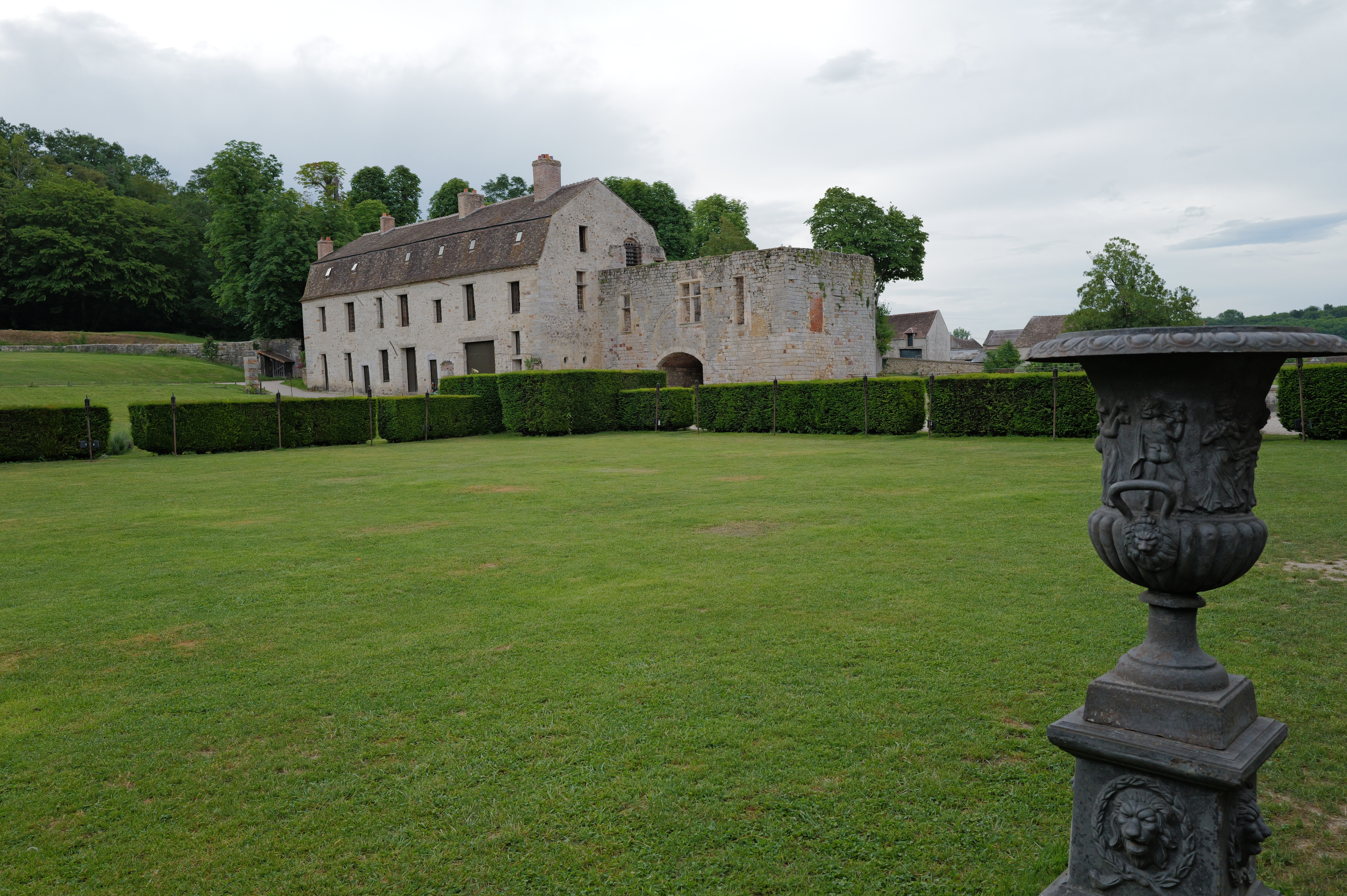
The central square

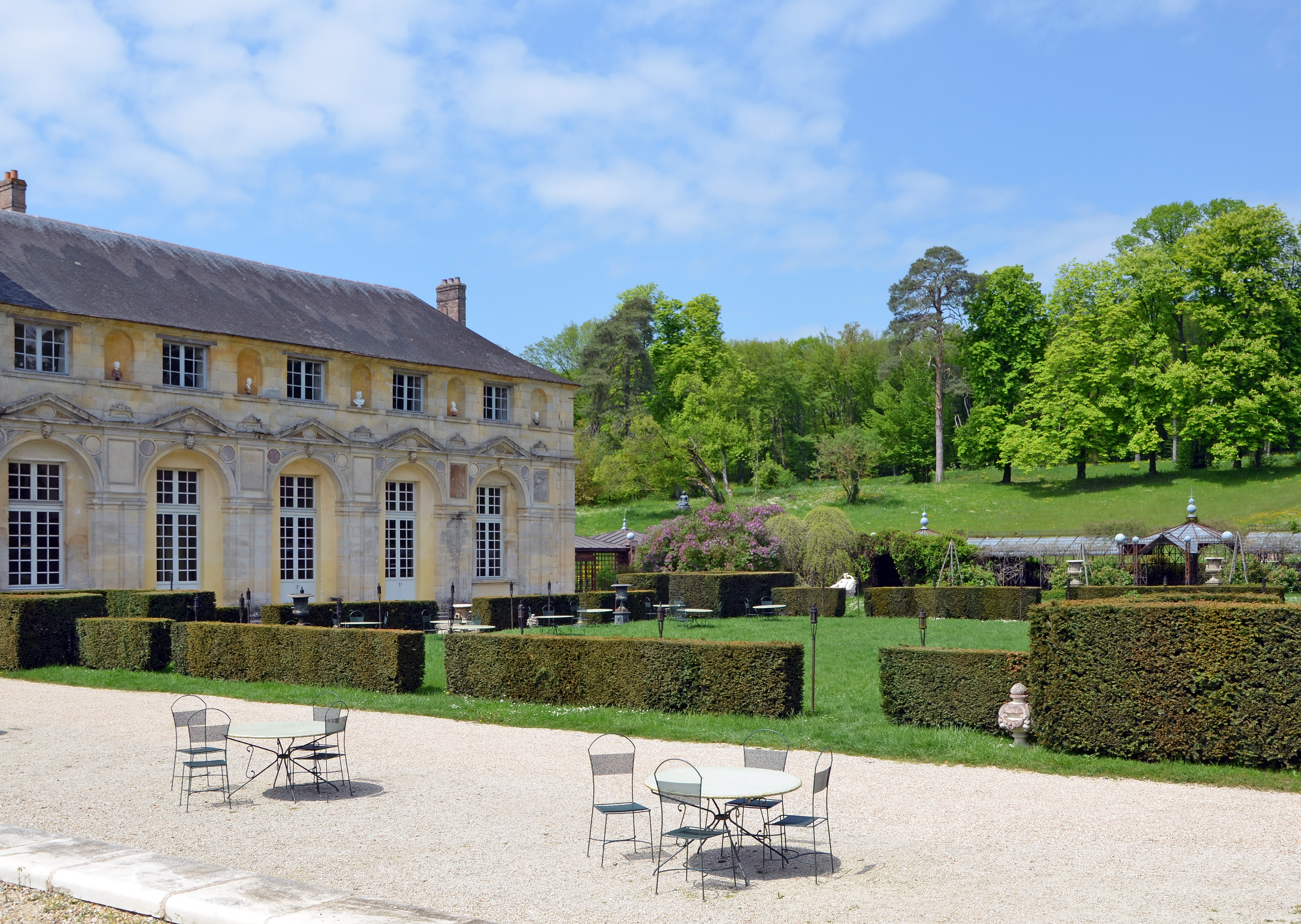
The central square

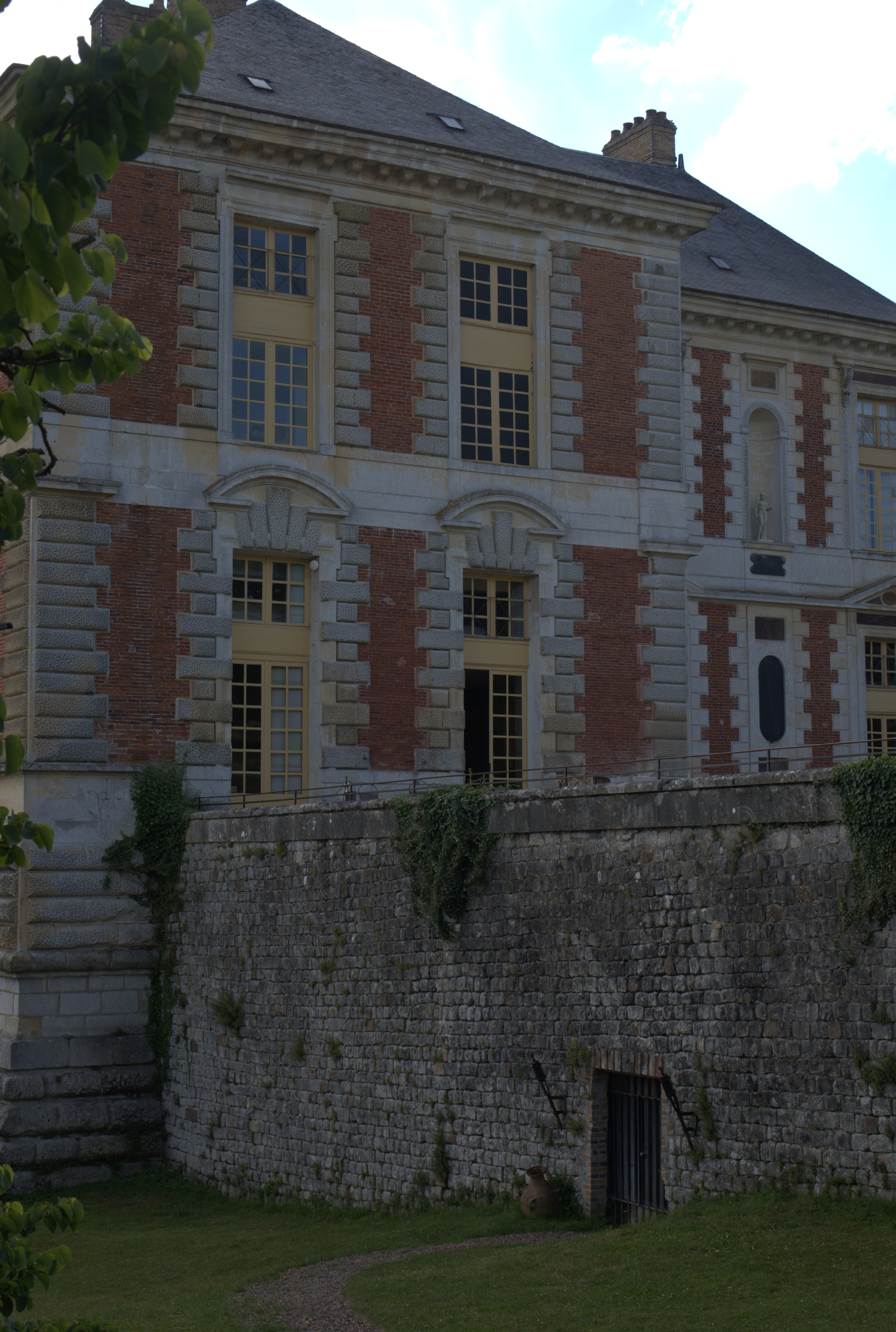
Entrance to the cellar

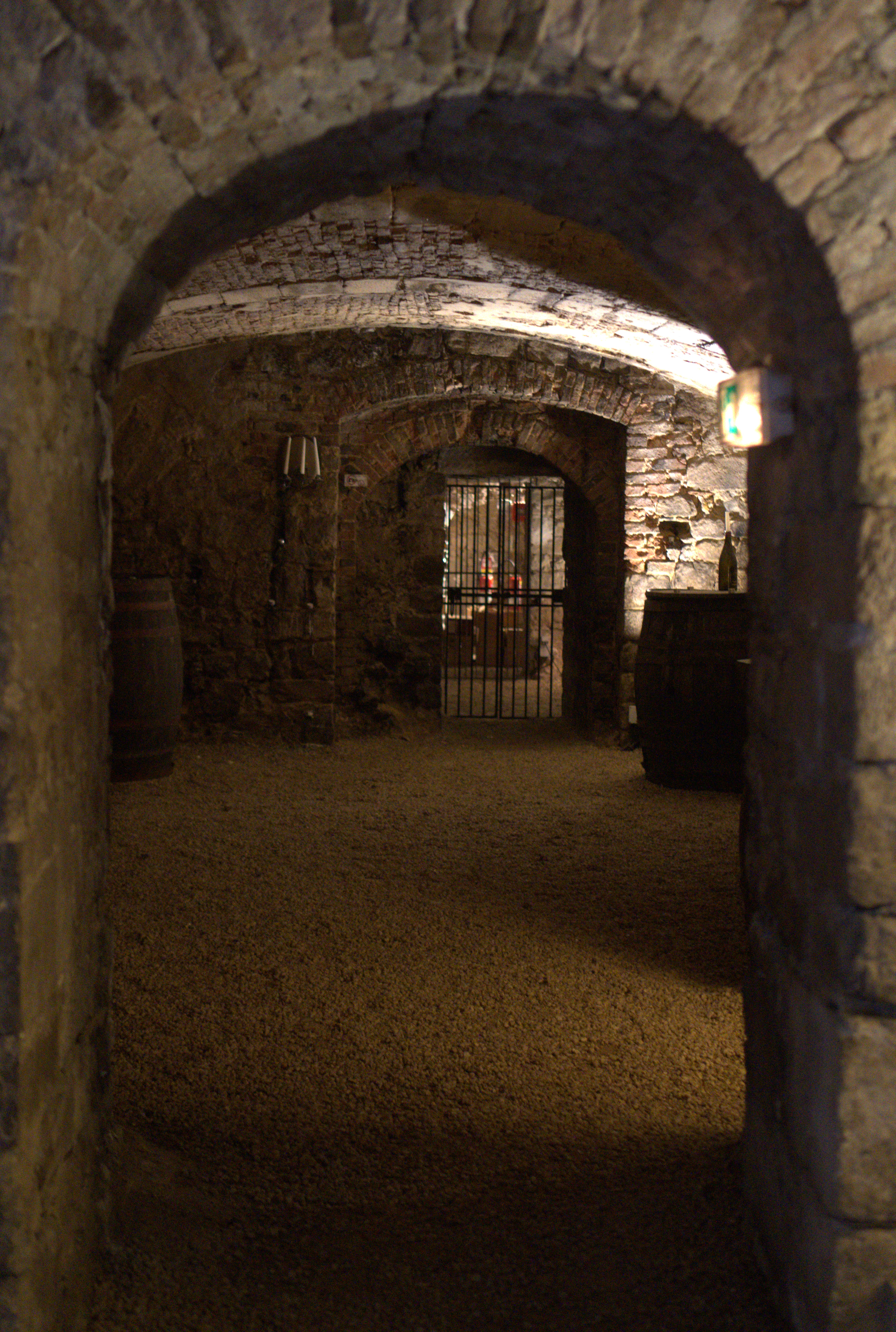
Interior of the cellar

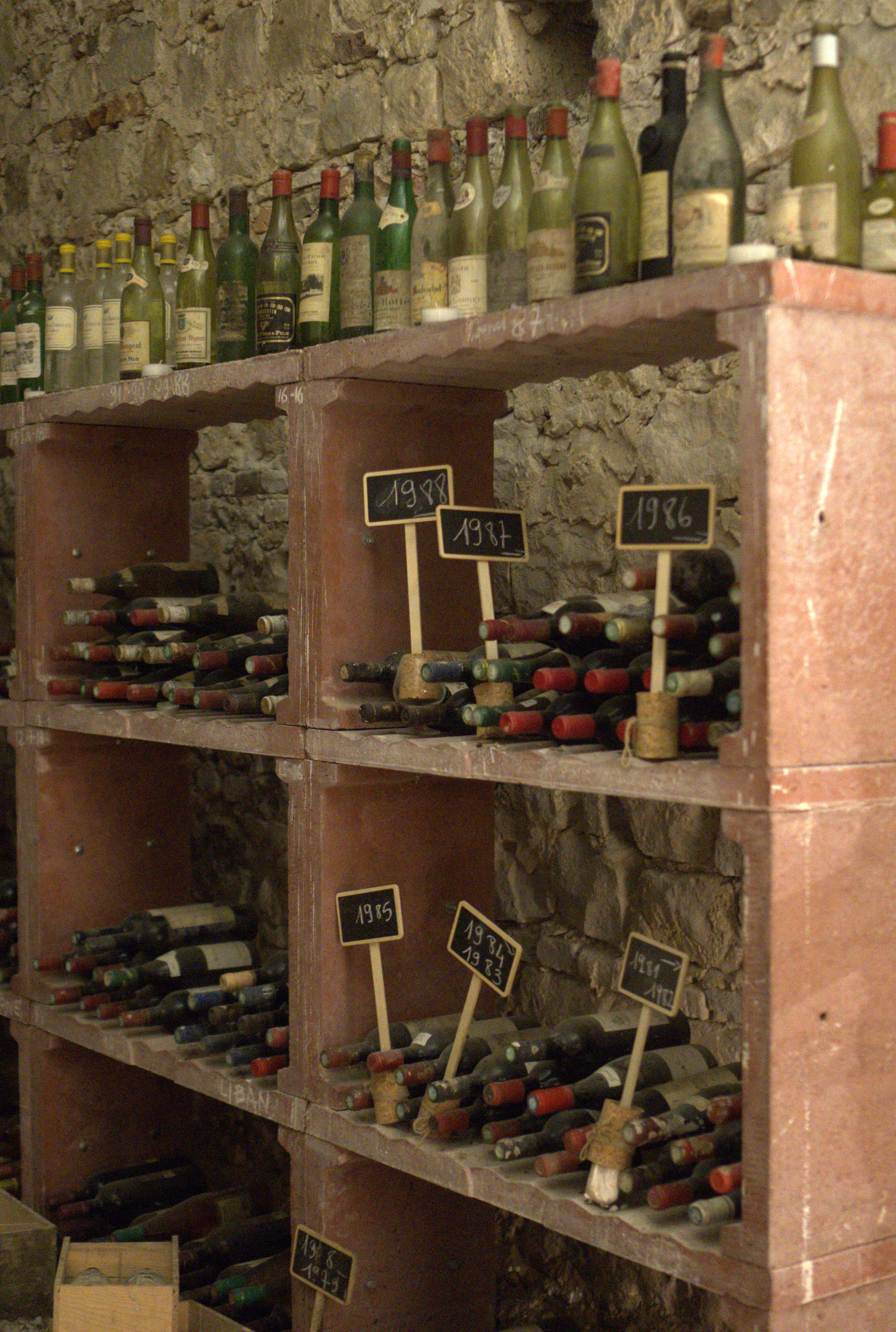
Interior of the cellar

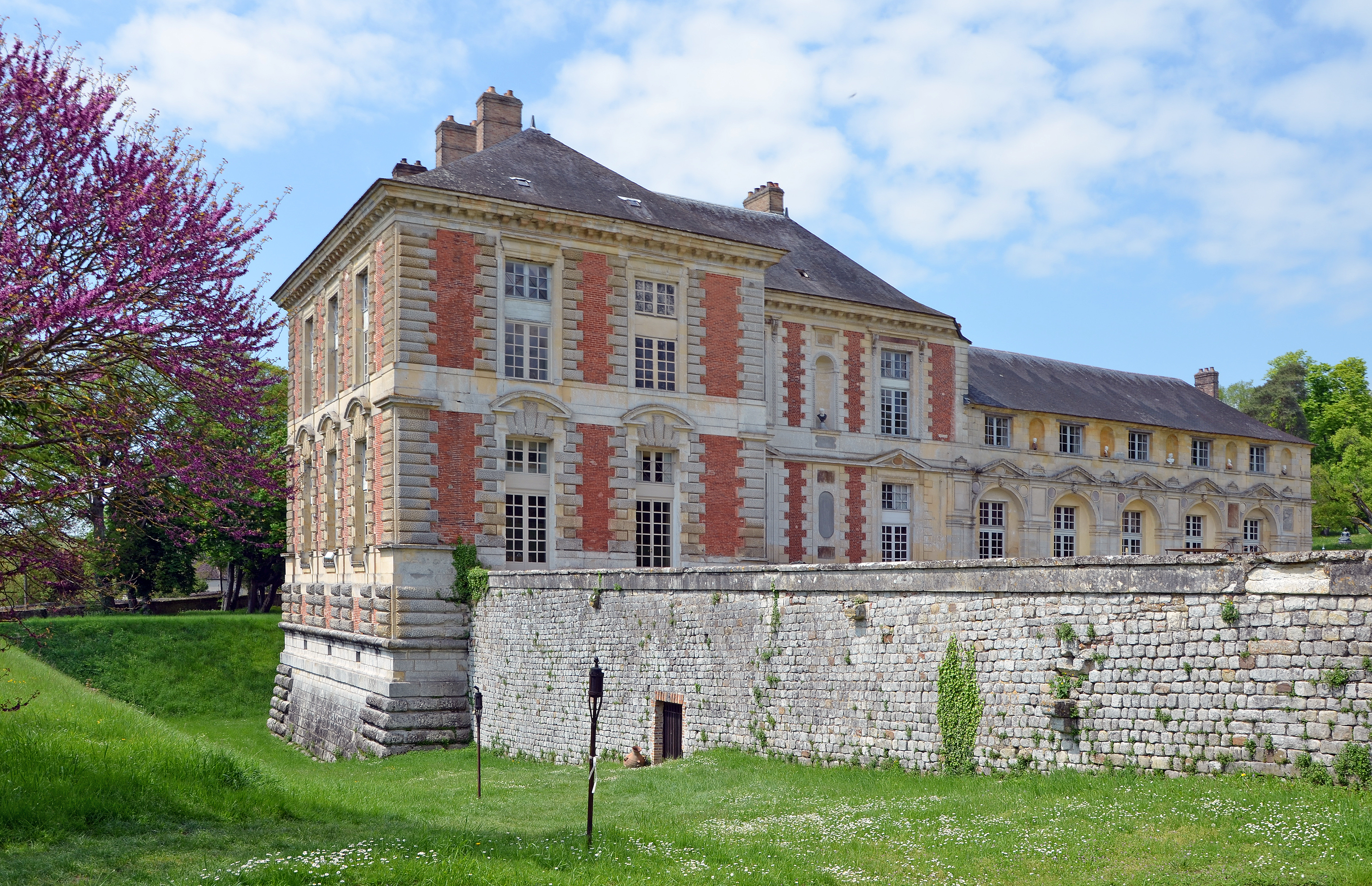
The Renaissance château

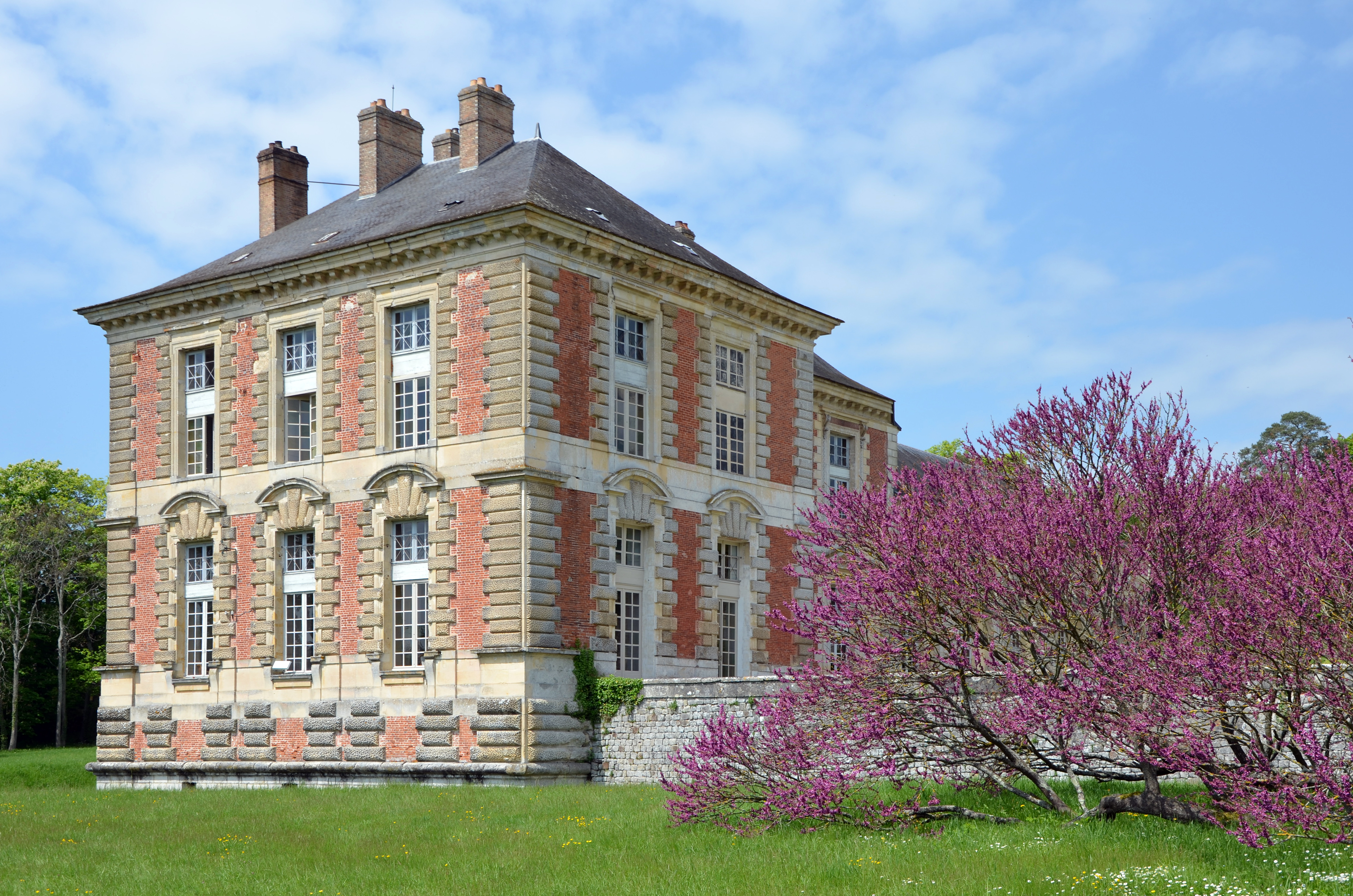
The Renaissance château

The dovecote

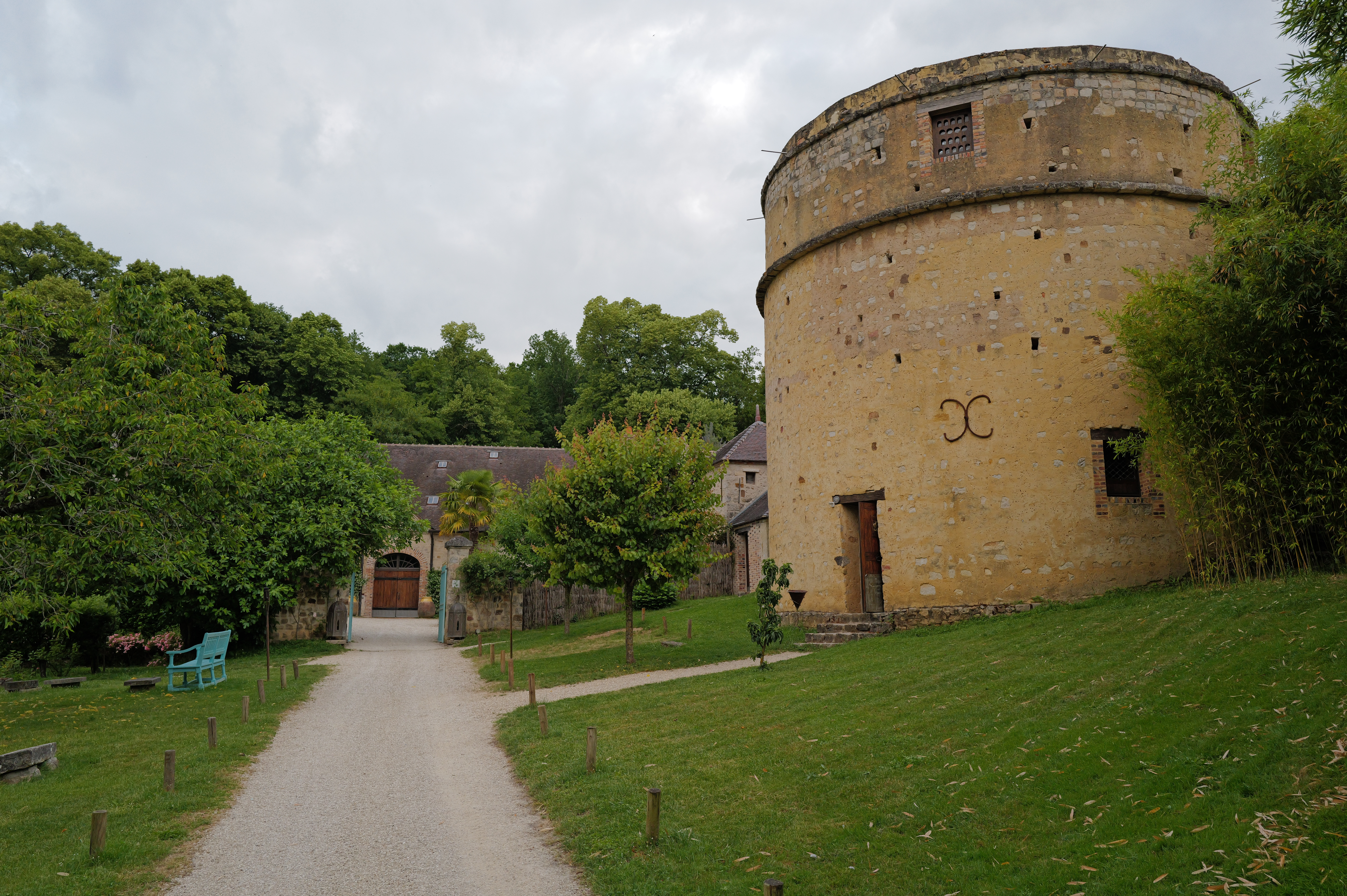
Exterior of the dovecote

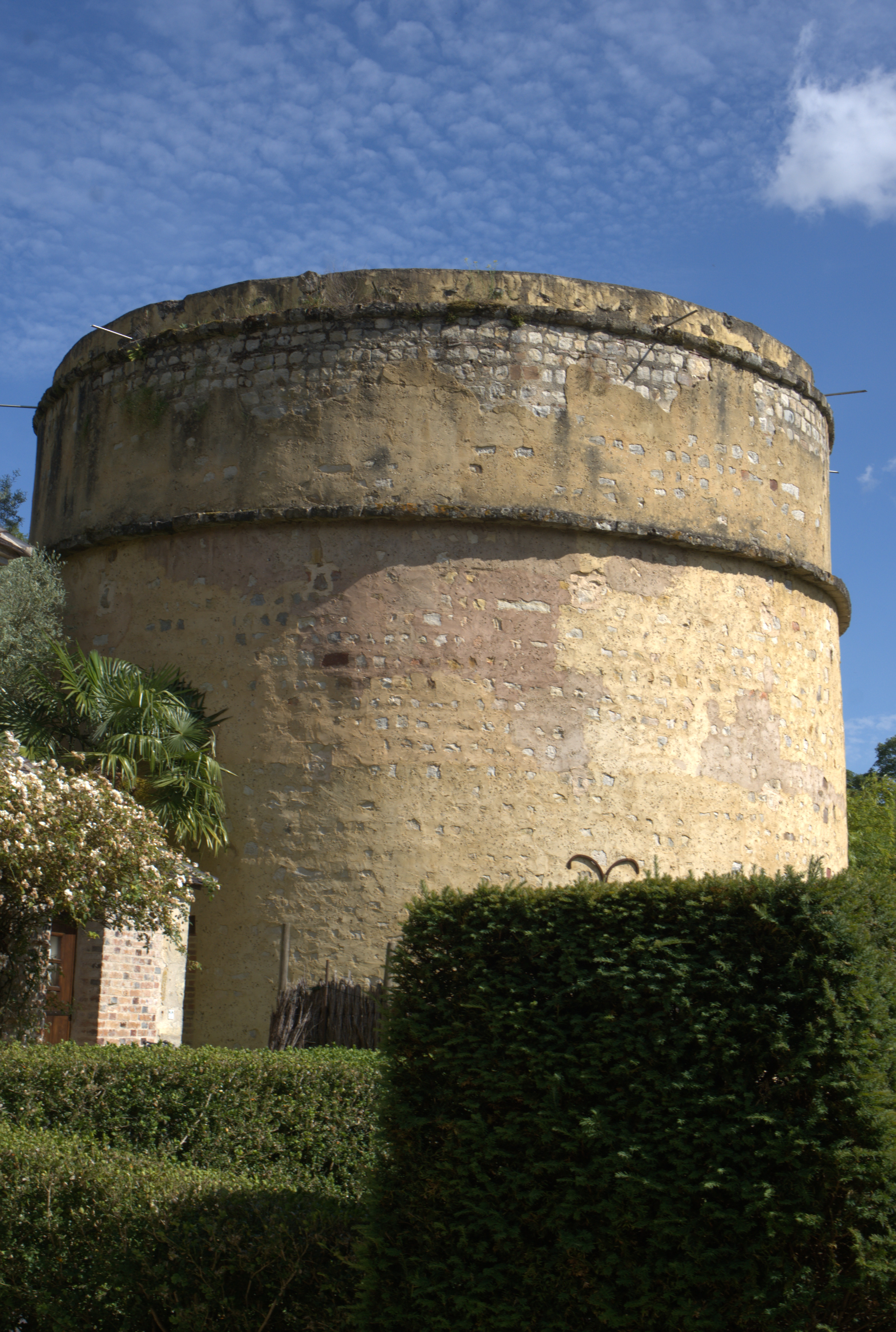
The dovecote

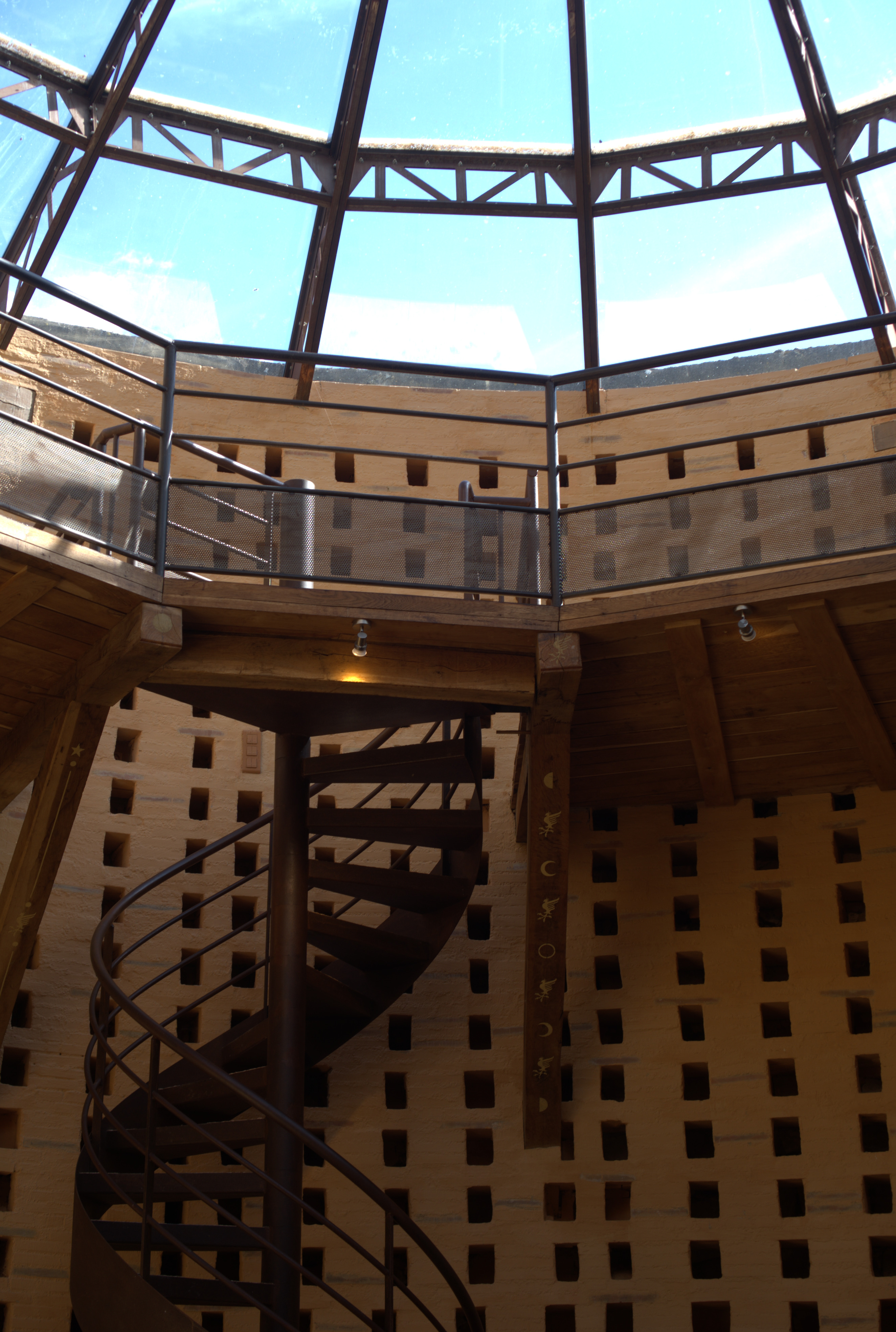
Interior of the dovecote

Gardens and park

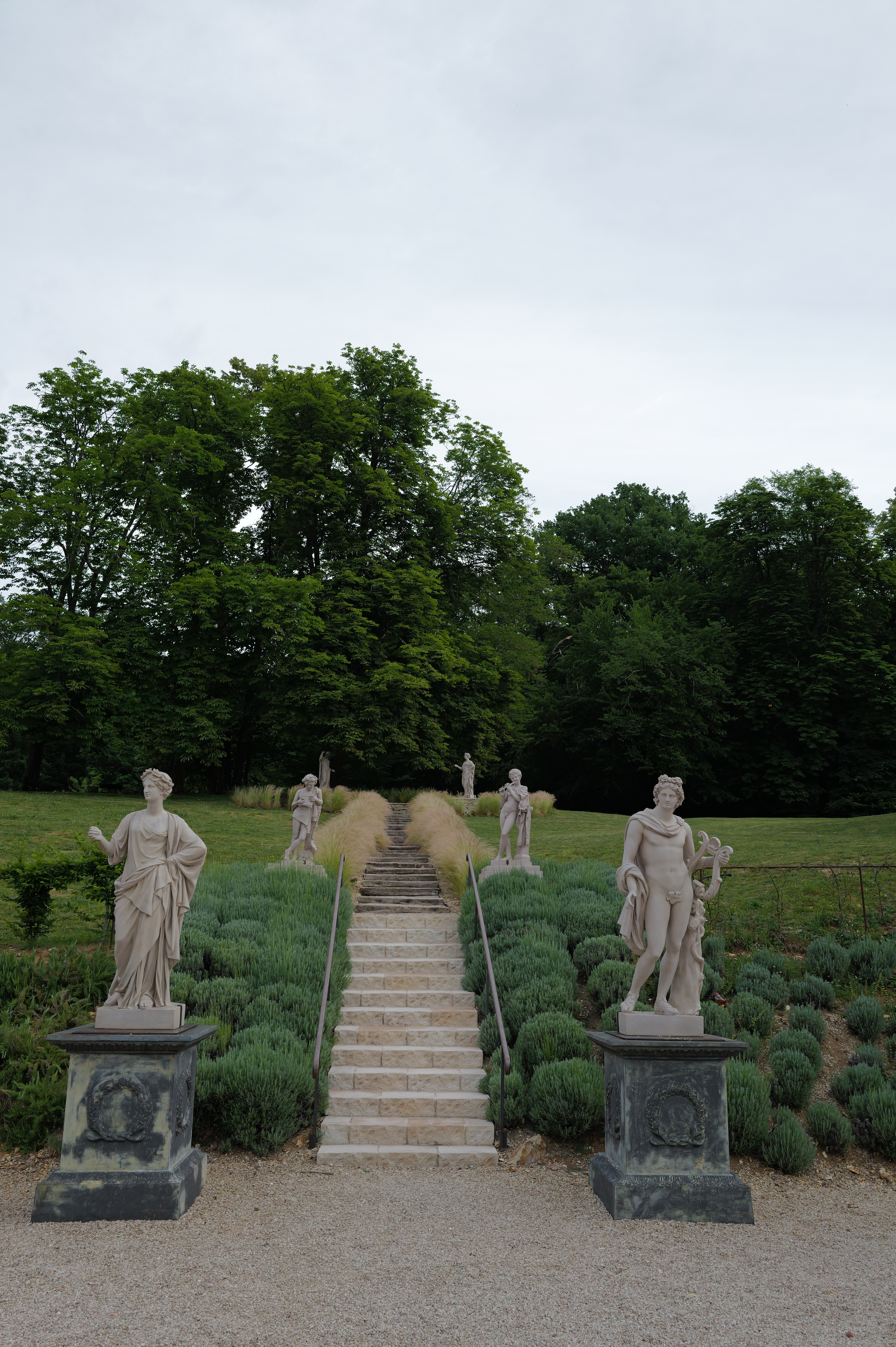
The hanging gardens

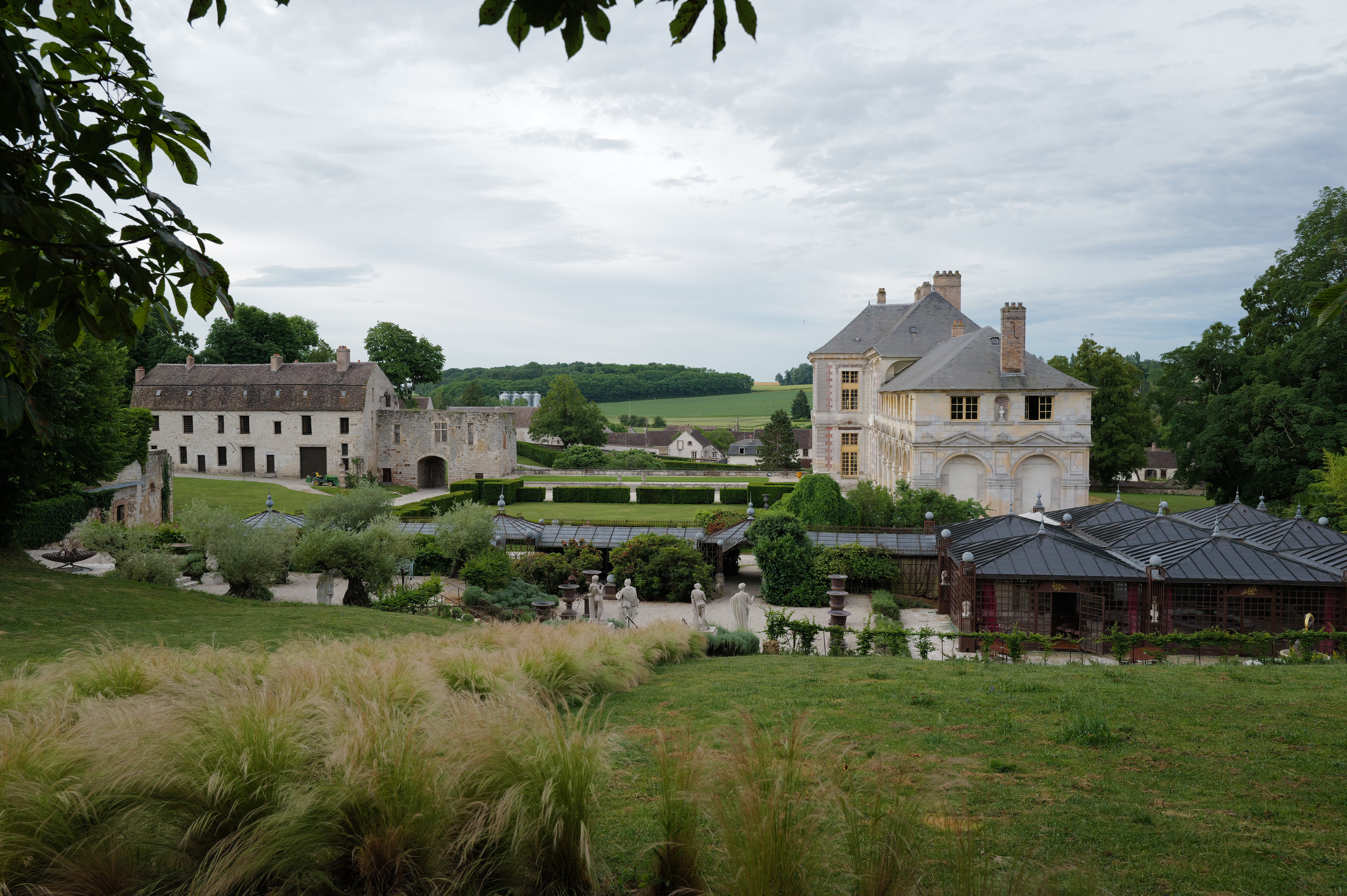
The hanging gardens

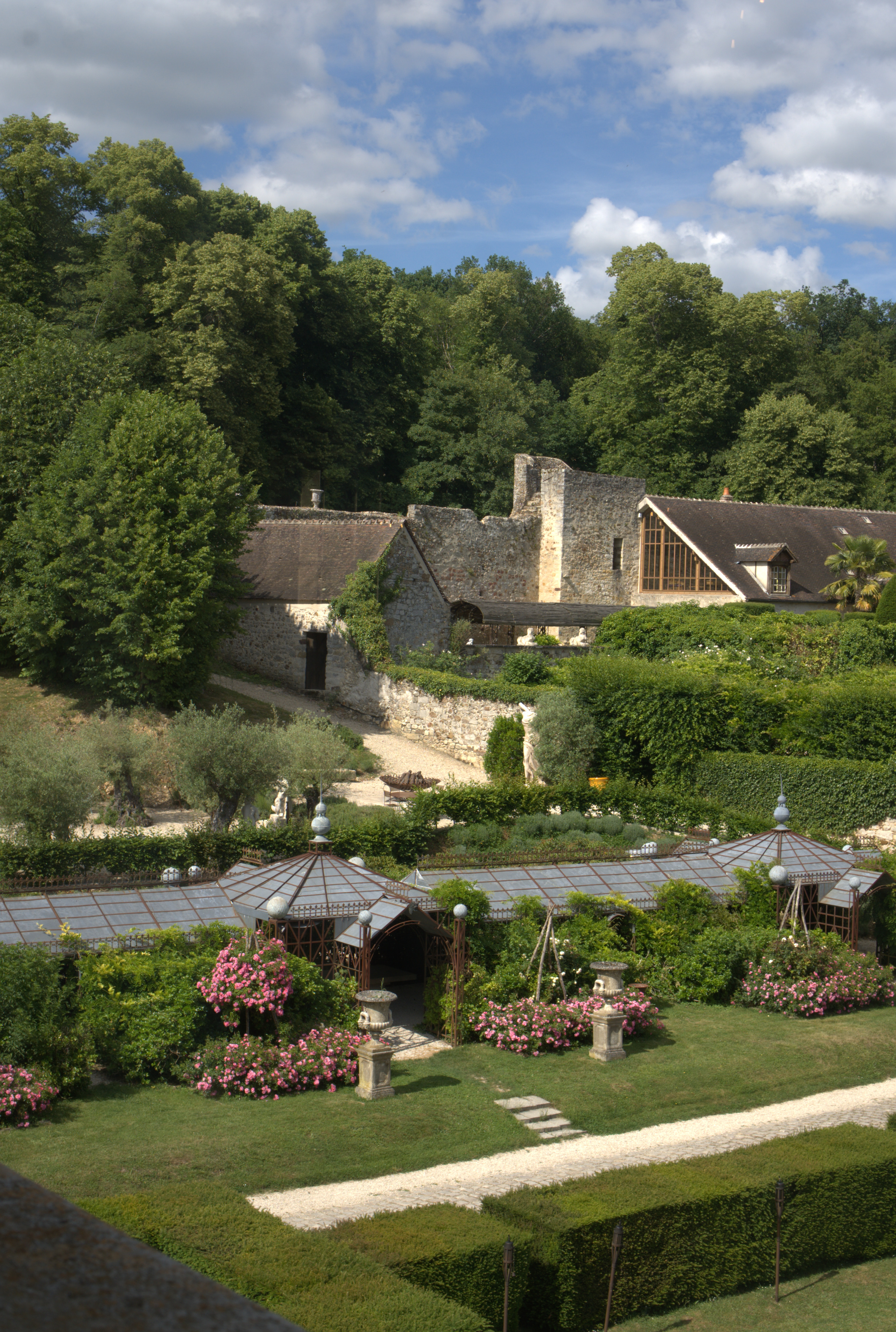
The arbor

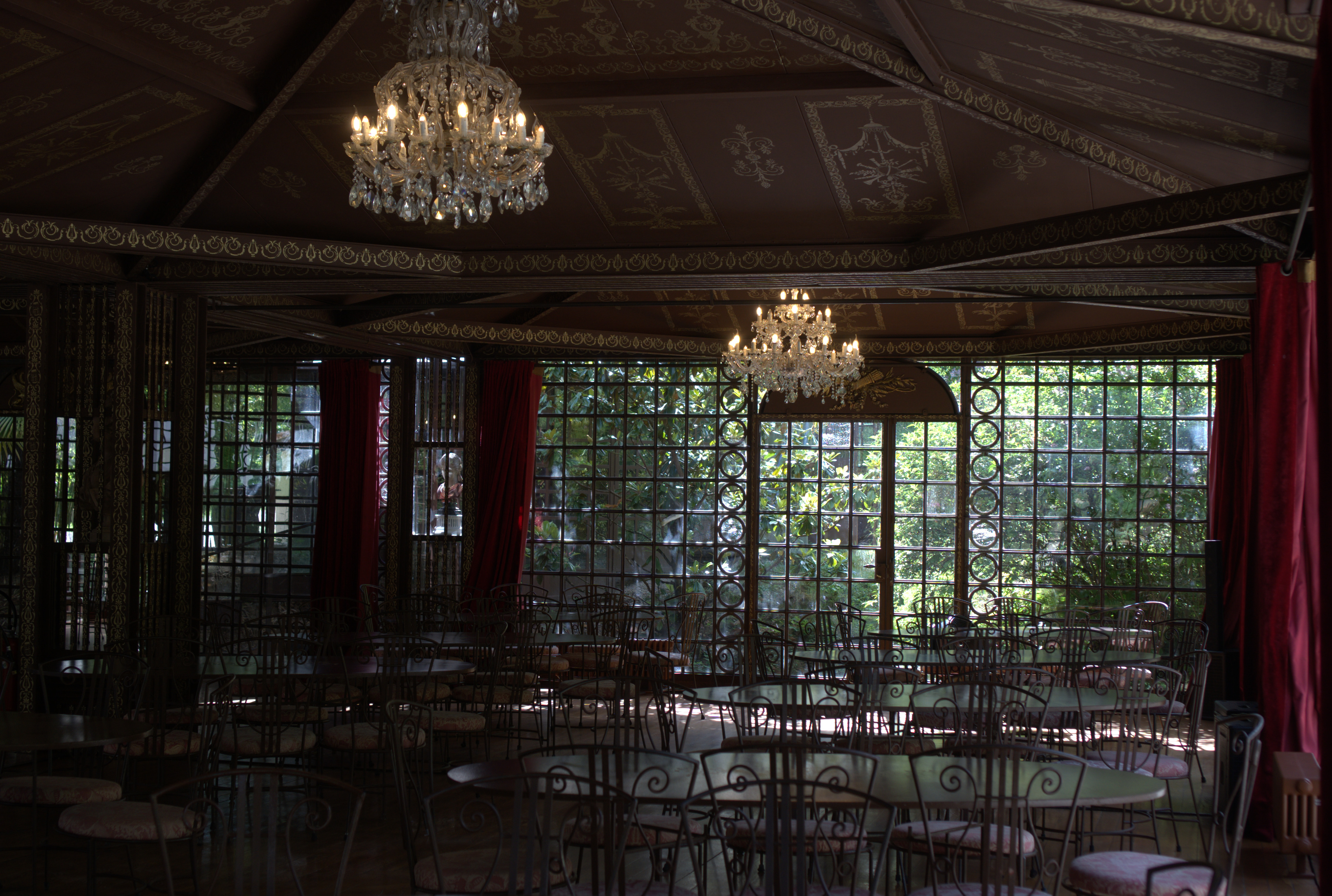
The Music Room, within the arbor

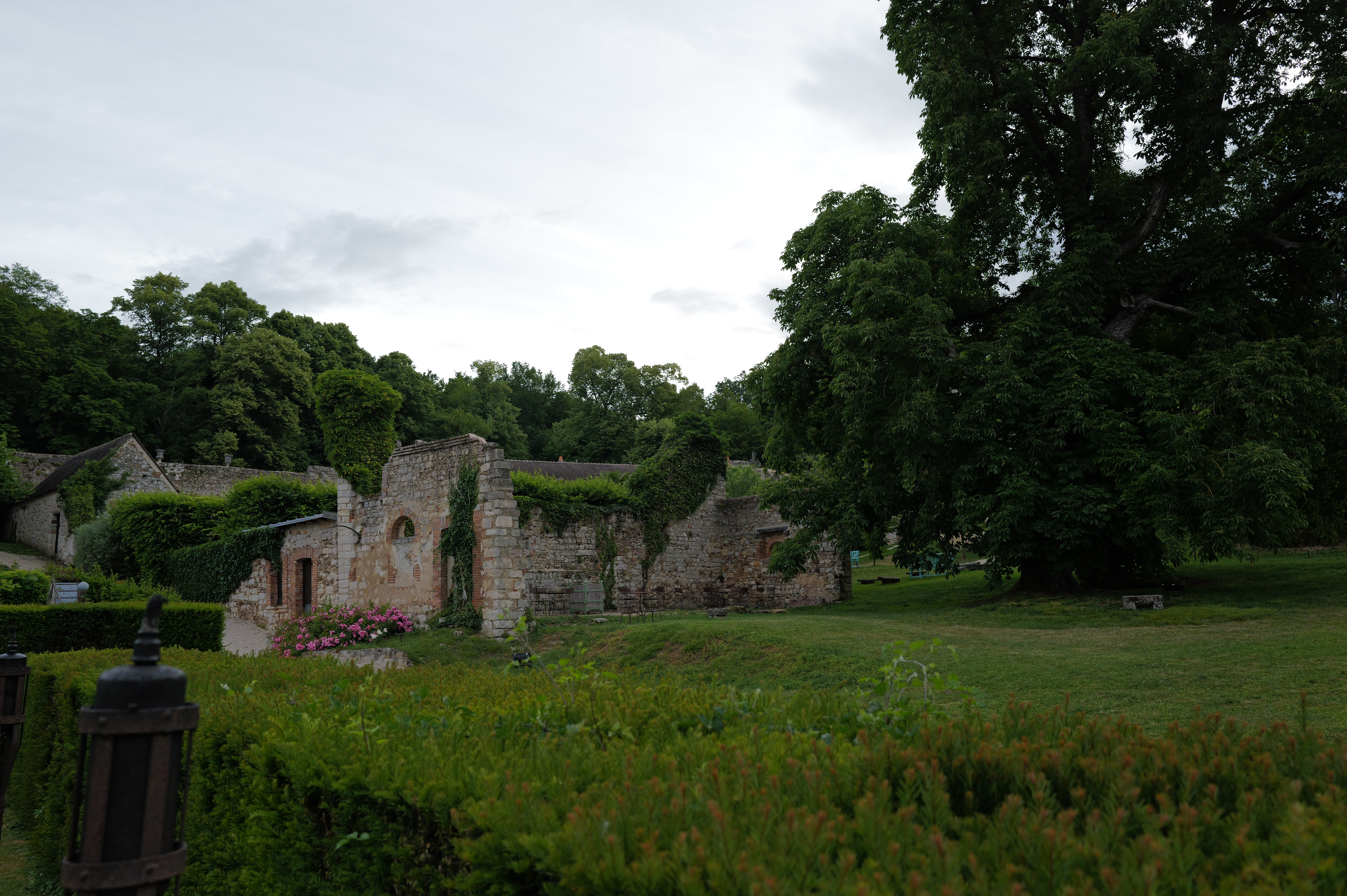
The amphitheatre

The former stables (Oriental Pavilion)

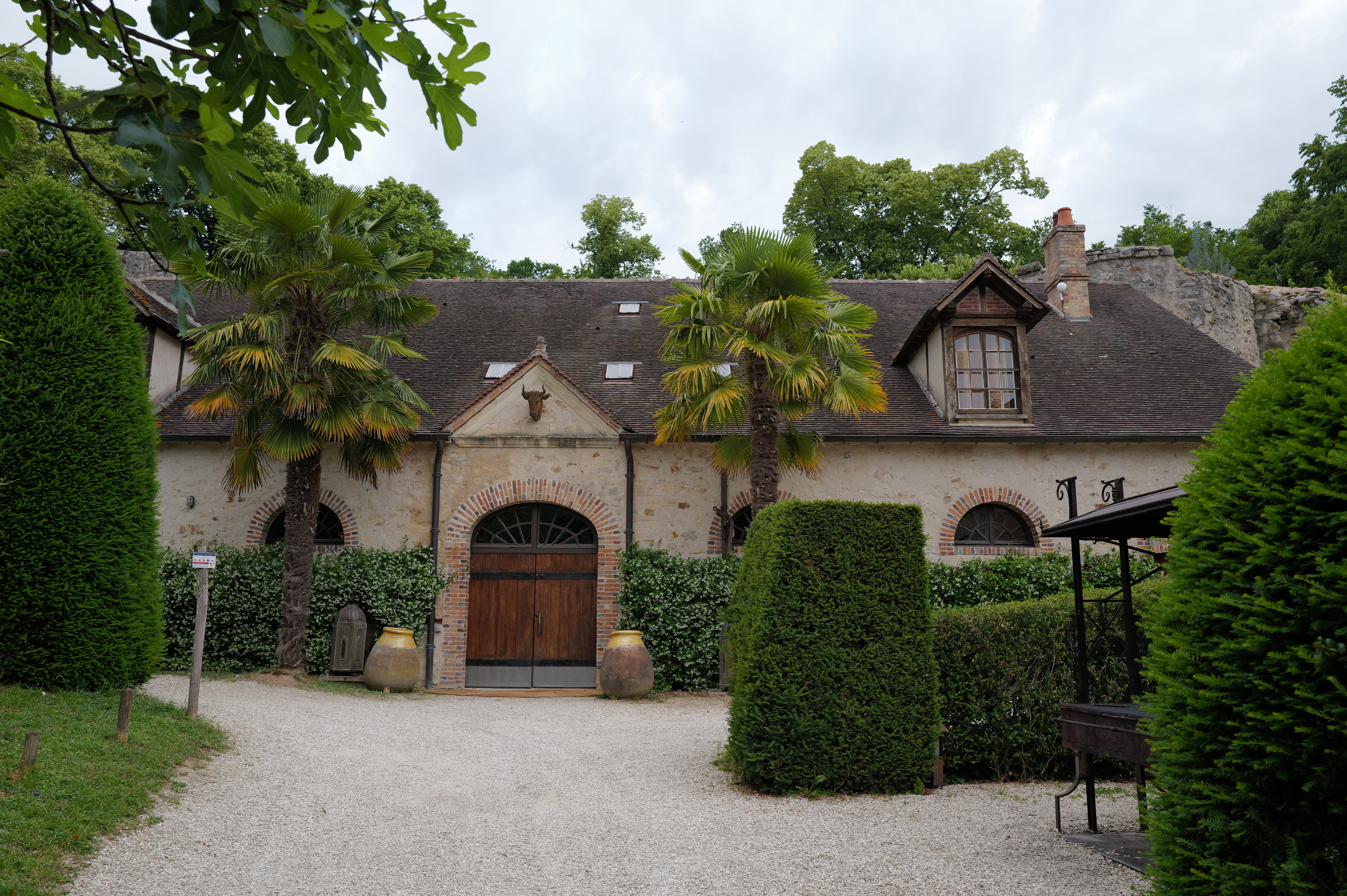
The Oriental Pavilion, in the former stables

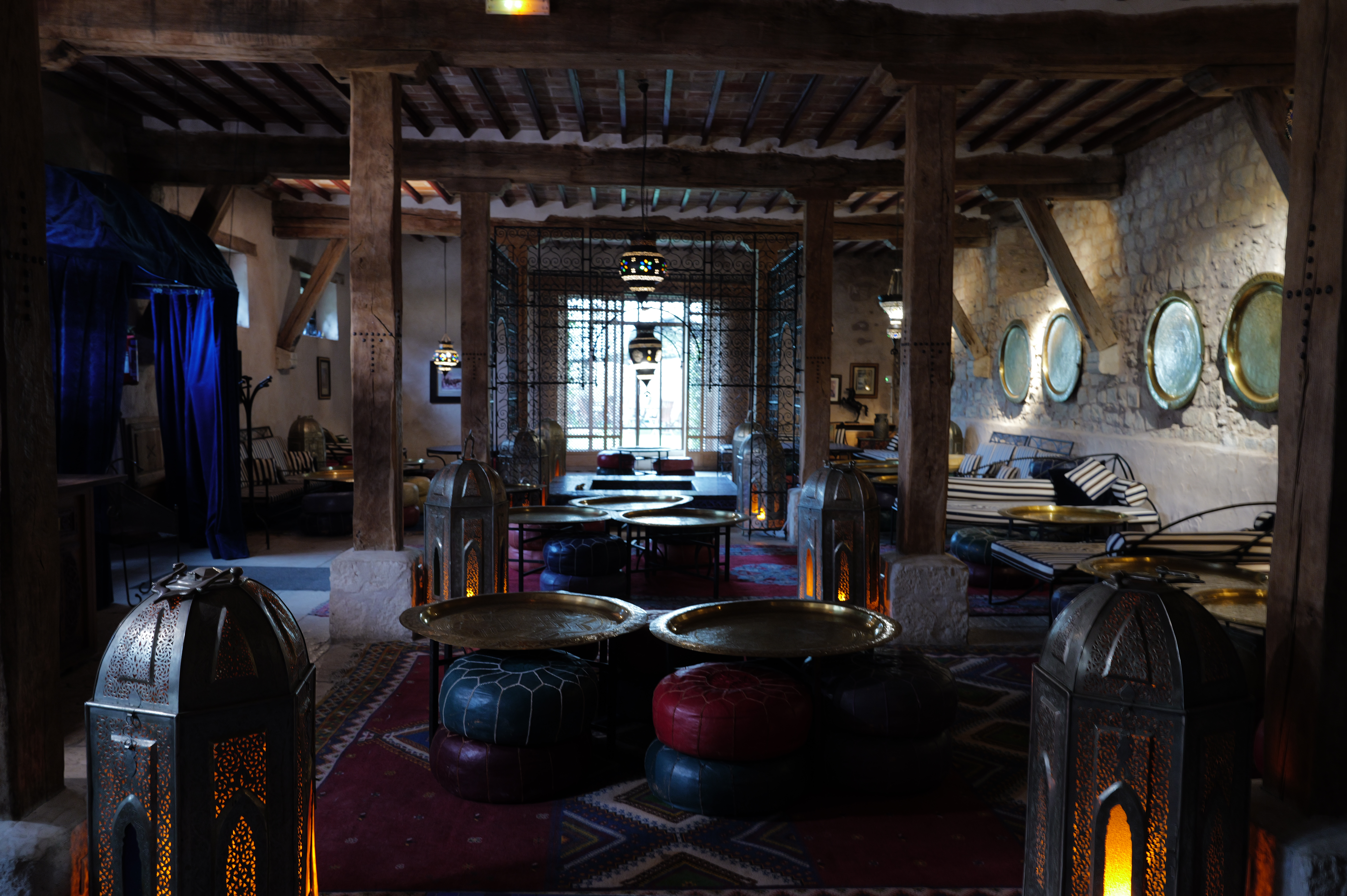
Interior of the Oriental Pavilion

Modern additions

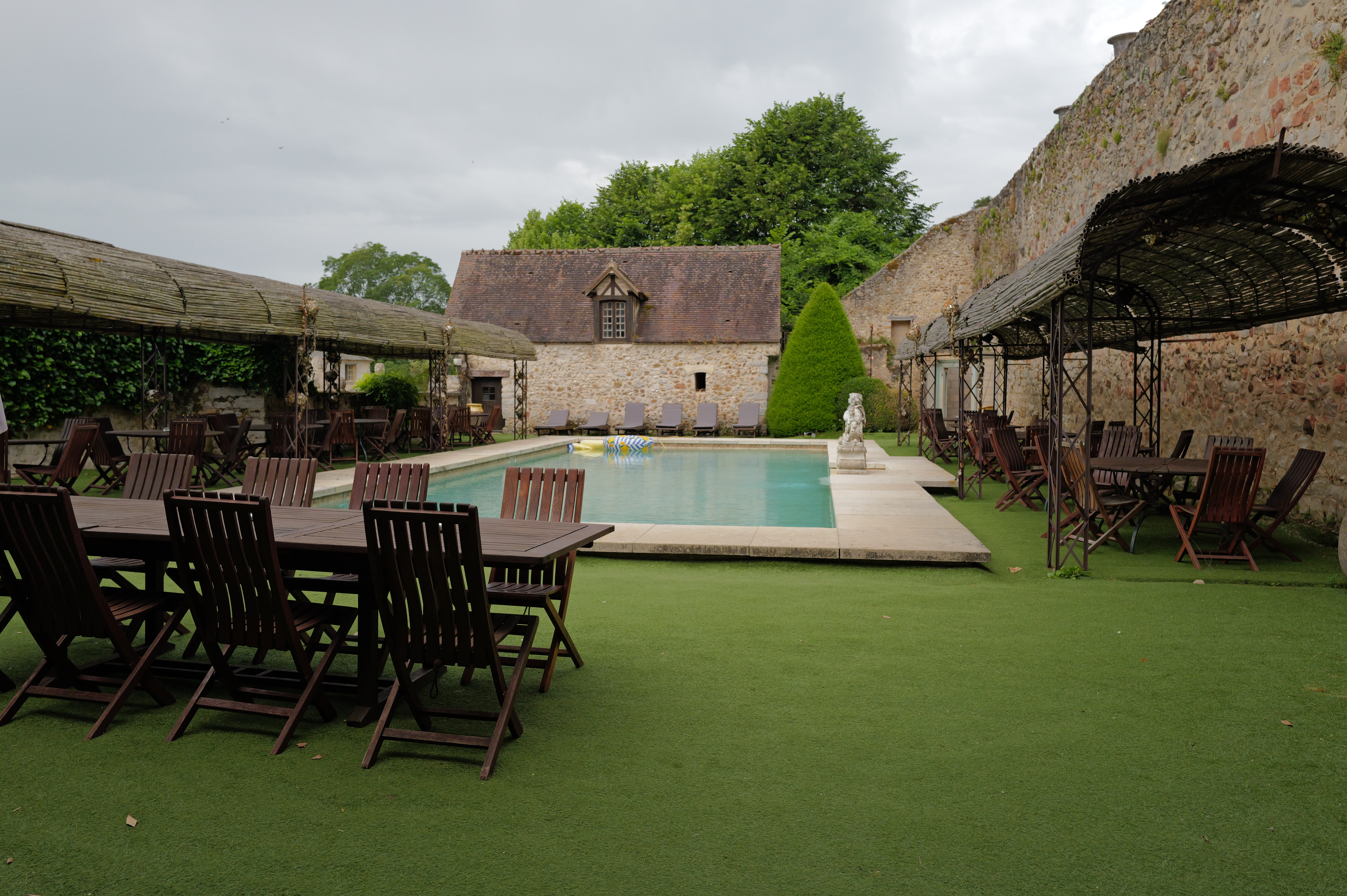
The swimming pool

== Bibliography ==
- Androuet du Cerceau, Jacques (1576). Les plus excellents bastiments de France. Vol. 1. Paris.
- Faisant, Étienne; Guillaume, Jean (2021). "Pierre Lescot et le pavillon du château de Vallery (Yonne)". Bulletin Monumental (in French). 179 (1): 31–40.
- Frommel, Sabine (2001). "Le portique du château de Vallery : un chef-d'œuvre de Pierre Lescot". Revue de l'art (in French). 131: 9–24. doi:10.3917/rda.131.0009.
- "Jardins d'agrément du château de Vallery". Base Mérimée (in French). Ministère français de la Culture.
- Planchenault, René (1963). "Le château de Vallery". Bulletin Monumental (in French). 121: 237–259.
- Vansteenberghe, Patrice (2013). Vallery, la fête au château: Princes, muses and weddings (in English and French). Gourcuff Gradenigo. ISBN 978-2-35340-166-6.
