= Princess of Taranto =

This is a list of princesses of Taranto, a principality in Southern Italy. As dynastic wives, they were often expected to mediate between their birth and marital families, such as when Isabella di Chiaramonte, princess of Taranto, mediated with her family on behalf of Ferrante during the War of Succession (1458–1465).

== Princess consort of Taranto ==
=== House of Hauteville, 1088–1194 ===
Picture	Name	Father	Birth	Marriage	Became Princess	Ceased to be Princess	Death	Spouse
	Constance of France	Philip I of France (Capet)	1078	25 March/26 May 1106		3 March 1111 husband's death	14 September 1126	Bohemond I
	Alice of Jerusalem	Baldwin II of Jerusalem (Rethel)	1110	Autumn 1126		1128; Taranto conquered by Sicily	1136–1151	Bohemond II
	Elvira of Castile	Alfonso VI of Castile (Jiménez)	1100	1117	1128 husband's conquest	1132 title passed to son	8 February 1135	Roger I
	Joan of England	Henry II of England (Plantagenet)	October 1165	13 February 1177		11 November 1189 husband's death	4 September 1199	William II
	Sibylla of Acerra	Roger, Count of Acerra (Medania)	1153	–	1189 husband's ascension	20 February 1194 husband's death	1205	Tancred II

=== House of Hohenstaufen, 1194–1266 ===
Picture	Name	Father	Birth	Marriage	Became Princess	Ceased to be Princess	Death	Spouse
	Beatrice of Provence	Raymond Berenguer IV, Count of Provence (Barcelona)	1234	31 January 1246	26 February 1266 husband's ascession	23 September 1267		Charles I
	Margaret of Burgundy	Odo, Count of Nevers (Burgundy)	1250	18 November 1268		7 January 1285 husband's death	4 September 1308	Charles I
	Maria of Hungary	Stephen V of Hungary (Árpád)	1257	May/June 1270	7 January 1285 husband's ascession	4 February 1294 title passed to son	25 March 1323	Charles II
	Thamar Angelina Komnene	Michael II Komnenos Doukas (Komnenodoukai)	–	13 August 1294		1309 repudiated	1311	Philip I
	Catherine of Valois	Charles, Count of Valois (Valois)	before 15 April 1303	30 July 1313		26 December 1331 husband's death	October 1346	Philip I
	Joan I of Naples	Charles, Duke of Calabria (Anjou-Naples)	1328	20 August 1346/7		26 May 1362 husband's death	12 May 1382	Louis
	Maria of Calabria	Charles, Duke of Calabria (Anjou-Naples)	May 1329	April 1355	26 May 1362 husband's accession	20 May 1366		Philip II
	Elizabeth of Slavonia	Stephen, Duke of Slavonia (Anjou-Hungary)	1352	20 October 1370		25 November 1374 husband's death	before 1380	Philip II

=== Capetian House of Anjou, 1266–1374 ===
Picture	Name	Father	Birth	Marriage	Became Princess	Ceased to be Princess	Death	Spouse
	Beatrice of Provence	Raymond Berenguer IV, Count of Provence (Barcelona)	1234	31 January 1246	26 February 1266 husband's ascession	23 September 1267		Charles I
	Margaret of Burgundy	Odo, Count of Nevers (Burgundy)	1250	18 November 1268		7 January 1285 husband's death	4 September 1308	Charles I
	Maria of Hungary	Stephen V of Hungary (Árpád)	1257	May/June 1270	7 January 1285 husband's ascession	4 February 1294 title passed to son	25 March 1323	Charles II
	Thamar Angelina Komnene	Nikephoros I Komnenos Doukas (Komnenodoukai)	–	13 August 1294		1309 repudiated	1311	Philip I
	Catherine of Valois	Charles, Count of Valois (Valois)	before 15 April 1303	30 July 1313		26 December 1331 husband's death	October 1346	Philip I
	Joan I of Naples	Charles, Duke of Calabria (Anjou-Naples)	1328	20 August 1346/7		26 May 1362 husband's death	12 May 1382	Louis
	Maria of Calabria	Charles, Duke of Calabria (Anjou-Naples)	May 1329	April 1355	26 May 1362 husband's accession	20 May 1366		Philip II
	Elizabeth of Slavonia	Stephen, Duke of Slavonia (Anjou-Hungary)	1352	20 October 1370		25 November 1374 husband's death	before 1380	Philip II

=== House of Baux, 1374–1383 ===
Picture	Name	Father	Birth	Marriage	Became Princess	Ceased to be Princess	Death	Spouse
	Agnes of Durazzo	Charles, Duke of Durazzo (Anjou-Durazzo)	1345	1382		7 July 1383 husband's death	15 July 1388	James of Baux

=== House of Welf, 1383–1393 ===
- None

=== House of Orsini, 1393–1406 ===
Picture	Name	Father	Birth	Marriage	Became Princess	Ceased to be Princess	Death	Spouse
	Mary of Enghien	John of Enghien, Count of Castro (Enghien)	1367/70	1384	1393 husband's accession	17 January 1406 husband's death	9 May 1446	Raimondo del Balzo Orsini

=== Capetian House of Anjou, 1406–1414 ===
Picture	Name	Father	Birth	Marriage	Became Princess	Ceased to be Princess	Death	Spouse
	Mary of Enghien	John of Enghien, Count of Castro (Enghien)	1367/70	23 April 1407		6 August 1414 husband's death	9 May 1446	Ladislaus

=== Capetian House of Anjou, 1414–1420 ===
Picture	Name	Father	Birth	Marriage	Became Princess	Ceased to be Princess	Death	Spouse
	Joan II of Naples	John of Enghien, Count of Castro (Anjou-Durazzo)	25 June 1373	10 August 1415		1420 revert to the Orsinis	2 February 1435	James II

=== House of Orsini, 1420–1463 ===
Picture	Name	Father	Birth	Marriage	Became Princess	Ceased to be Princess	Death	Spouse
	Anna Colonna	Lorenzo Onofrio Colonna (Colonna)	–	1417	1420 husband's accession	15 November 1463 husband's death	–	Giovanni Antonio del Balzo Orsini

=== House of Clermont, 1463–1465 ===
- None

=== House of Trastámara, 1465–1501 ===
Picture	Name	Father	Birth	Marriage	Became Princess	Ceased to be Princess	Death	Spouse
	Isabella del Balzo	Pietro del Balzo, 4tb Duke of Andria	–	28 November 1486	7 September 1496 husband's accession	1501 husband's desposition	1533	Frederick

== Titular princess consort of Taranto ==
=== House of Trastámara, 1501–1506 ===
Picture	Name	Father	Birth	Marriage	Became princess	Ceased to be princess	Death	Spouse
	Isabella del Balzo	Pietro del Balzo, 4tb Duke of Andria	–	28 November 1486	1501 husband's desposition	9 November 1504 husband's death	1533	Frederick

=== House of Laval, 1506–1554 ===
- Anne de Laval (1505–1554)

Picture	Name	Father	Birth	Marriage	Became Princess	Ceased to be Princess	Death	Spouse
	Anne de Laval	Guy XVI, Count of Laval	23 Sep 1505	23 Jan 1521			1554	François II de La Trémoille

=== House of La Trémoille, 1554–1971 ===
Picture	Name	Father	Birth	Marriage	Became Princess	Ceased to be Princess	Death	Spouse
	Jeanne de Montmorency	Anne de Montmorency (Montmorency)	1528	29 June 1549	1554 husband's accession	25 March 1577 husband's death	3 October 1596	Louis III
	Countess Charlotte Brabantina of Nassau	William the Silent (Montmorency)	17 September 1580	11 March 1598		25 October 1604 husband's death	August 1631	Claude
	Marie de La Tour d'Auvergne	Henri de La Tour d'Auvergne, Duke of Bouillon (La Tour d'Auvergne)	17 January 1601	19 January 1619		24 May 1665		Henri III
	Madeleine de Créquy, Princess of Poix	Charles III de Créquy (Créquy)	1662	3 April 1675		12 August 1707		Charles Belgique Hollande
	Marie-Madeleine Motier de La Fayette	Rene-Armand, marquis de La Fayette (La Fayette)	1691	13 April 1706	1 June 1709 husband's accession	1717		Charles Louis Bretagne
	Marie Hortense de La Tour d'Auvergne	Emmanuel Théodose de La Tour d'Auvergne, Duke of Bouillon (La Tour d'Auvergne)	27 January 1704	29 January 1725		23 May 1741 husband's death	?	Charles Louis Bretagne
	Marie-Genevieve de Durfort, Mademoiselle de Randan	Guy-Michel de Durfort, Duc of Lorges and Randan (Durfort)	3 February 1735	18 February 1751		10 December 1762		Jean Bretagne Charles
	Princess Marie-Maximilienne of Salm-Kyrburg	Philip Joseph, Prince of Salm-Kyrburg (Salm-Kyrburg)	1744	27 June 1763		13 July 1790		Jean Bretagne Charles
	Louise Emmanuelle de Châtillon	Louis Gaucher, duc de Châtillon (Châtillon)	3 July 1763	10 July 1781	19 May 1792 husband's accession	4 July 1814		Charles Bretagne Marie
	Marie Virginie de Saint-Didier	Count Antoine de Saint-Didier (Saint-Didier)	?	9 June 1817		16 January 1829		Charles Bretagne Marie
	Joséphine Walsh de Serrant	Antoine de Walsh-Serrant, Count de Serrant (Walsh-Serrant)	7 March 1810	14 September 1830		10 November 1839 husband's death	10 September 1887	Charles Bretagne Marie
	Marguerite Tanneguy de Duchatel	Count Charles Marie Tanneguy-Duchâtel (Tanneguy-Duchâtel)	16 December 1840	2 July 1862		4 July 1911 husband's death	19 September 1913	Louis Charles
	Hélène Pillet-Will	Count Frédéric Pillet-Will (Pillet-Will)	27 January 1875	1 February 1892	4 July 1911 husband's accession	17 June 1921 husband's death	24 March 1964	Louis Charles Marie

=== House of Ligne-La Trémoille, since 1971 ===
Picture	Name	Father	Birth	Marriage	Became Princess	Ceased to be Princess	Death	Spouse
	Maria del Rosario de Lambertye-Gerbeviller	Marquis Charles Edmond de Lambertye de Gerbevillers (Lambertye-Gerbeviller)	14 October 1922	11 March 1942	27 October 1971 husband's accession	9 July 2005 husband's death		Jean Charles
	Princess Alyette de Croÿ	Prince Rodolphe de Croÿ (Croÿ)	13 July 1951	23 January 1976	9 July 2005 husband's accession	Incumbent		Charles-Antoine

== See also ==
- List of consorts of Sicily
- List of consorts of Naples
- List of consorts of Albania
- Duchess of Calabria
- Princess of Achaea
- Princess of Antioch
