= Lamoral =

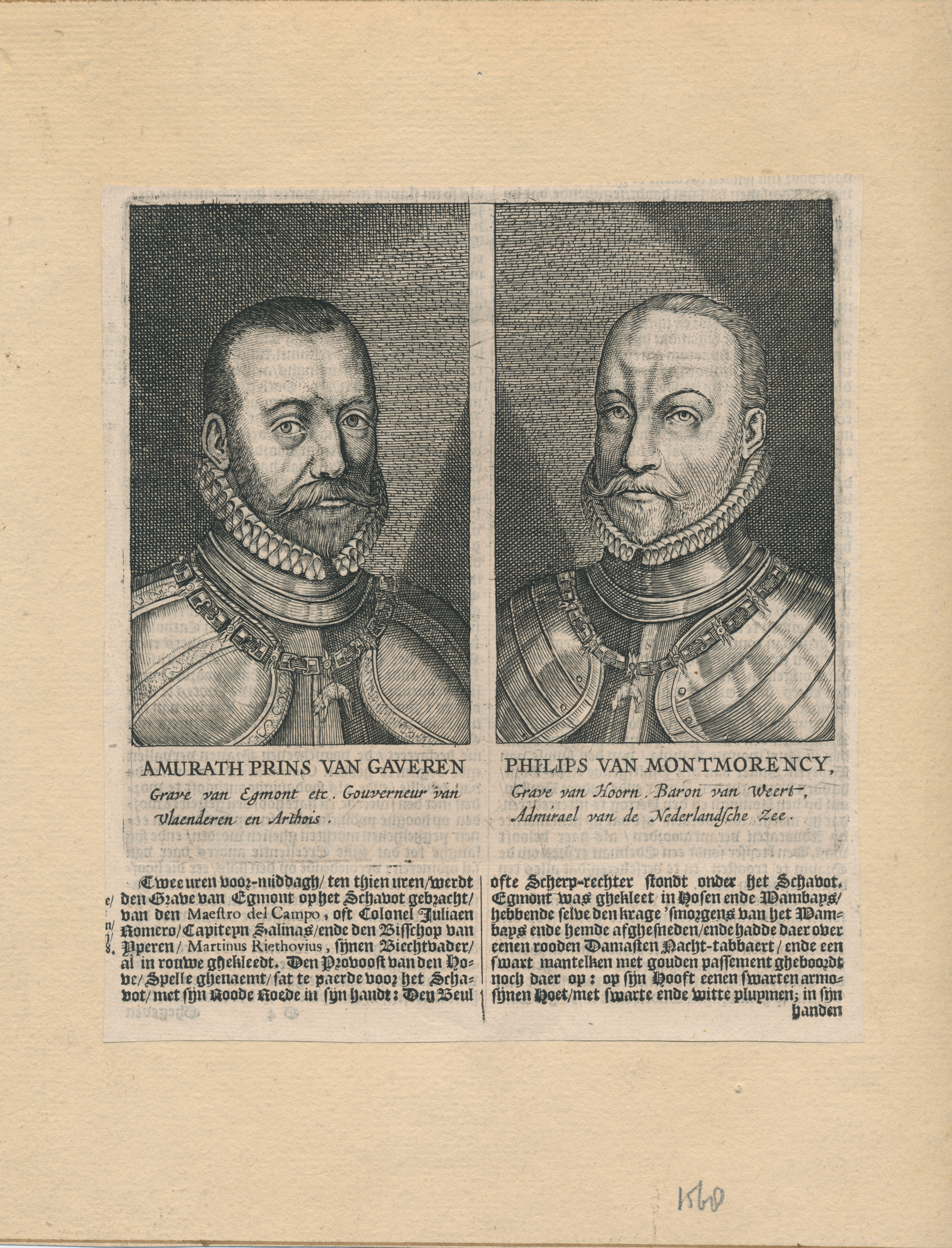
Early 17th-century engraving showing the counts of Egmont and Horne as "Amurath, Prins van Gaveren" and "Philips van Montmorency"

Lamoral is a given name mostly known from the noble houses of Egmond, Ligne and Taxis. The Dutch form is Lamoraal. The first known person by the name, Lamoral, Count of Egmont (1522–1568) was since the 17th-century also known as Amurath, perhaps leading to the hypothesis that the name derived via French from the Ottoman sultan's name Amurath. Alternatively, his name may be derived from French "L'Admiral" [lamiral], as has been recorded for another person with the name and as Egmont was sometimes referred to in his lifetime.
People named Lamoral or Lamoraal include:

House of Egmont

- Lamoral of Egmont (1522–1568), 4th Count of Egmont; a leading nobleman in the Habsburg Netherlands; his beheading partly ignited the Dutch Revolt
- Lamoral II of Egmont (c. 1565 – 1617), 6th Count of Egmont

House of Ligne

- Lamoral, 1st Prince of Ligne (1563–1624), diplomat in the Spanish Netherlands
- Claude Lamoral, 3rd Prince of Ligne (1618–1679), soldier and diplomat in the Spanish Netherlands
- Claude Lamoral, 6th Prince of Ligne (1685–1766), field marshal in the Austrian Netherlands
- Charles-Joseph Lamoral, 7th Prince de Ligne (1735–1814), field marshal in the Austrian Netherlands
- Henri Florent Lamoral, prince de Ligne (1881–1967), Belgian nobleman
- Jean Charles Lamoral of Ligne-La Trémoïlle (1911–2005), Belgian nobleman
- Charles-Antoine Lamoral of Ligne-La Trémoïlle (born 1946), Belgian businessman

House of Thurn and Taxis

- Lamoral von Taxis (1557–1624), official in the Spanish Netherlands
- Lamoral II Claudius Franz, Count of Thurn and Taxis (1621–1676), German nobleman and Imperial Postmaster
- Maximilian Anton Lamoral, Hereditary Prince of Thurn and Taxis (1831–1867)
- Paul Maximilian Lamoral, Prince of Thurn and Taxis (1843–1879)
- Maximilian Maria Lamoral Fürst von Taxis (1862–1885), 7th prince 1871–1885

Others

- Lamoraal Ulbo de Sitter (1902–1980), Dutch geologist
- Lamoraal Ulbo de Sitter (1930–2010), Dutch sociologist, son of the above
- Maximilian Karl Lamoral O'Donnell (1812–1895), Austrian officer and civil servant who helped save the life of Emperor Franz Josef I
- Willem Frederik Lamoraal Boissevain (1852–1919), Dutch colonial administrator on Java

== See also ==
- 13097 Lamoraal, Main Belt asteroid named after Lamoral, Count of Egmont (1522–1568)
