= Jean de la Trémoille =

Jean de la Trémoille is the name of:

- Jean de la Trémoille (1377–1449), Grand Master and Grand Chamberlain to the dukes of Burgundy John the Fearless and Philip the Good
- Jean Bretagne Charles de La Trémoille (1737–1792), duke of Thouars, married a daughter of Philip Joseph, Prince of Salm-Kyrburg
