= La Trémoille family =

Ancient French noble family

La Trémoïlle
- Country: France; Belgium
- Etymology: La Trimouille
- Founded: 11th Century
- Founder: Pierre, Seigneur of La Trémoïlle
- Current head: Prince Charles-Antoine Lamoral de Ligne-La Trémoïlle (Cognatic Line)
- Final head: Louis Jean Marie de La Trémoille (Agnatic Line)
- Titles: Prince and Duke of La Trémoille; Duke of Thouars; Prince of Tarente; Prince of Talmond; Duke and Viscount of Thouars; Duke of Châtellerault; Duke of Noirmoutier; Marquis of Royan; Count of Joigny
- Dissolution: 1933 (In the agnatic line)

The House of La Trémoïlle (Maison de La Trémoille in French) was an ancient French noble family from Poitou whose name comes from the village La Trimouille in the department of Vienne. This family has been known since the middle of the 11th century, and since the 14th century its members have been conspicuous in French history as nobles, military leaders and crusaders, and influential as political leaders, diplomats, Huguenots and courtiers. The male line of the family died out in 1933, while female line heirs of the last Duke have kept the La Trémoïlle surname alive in both France and Belgium.

== Lords and crusaders ==
Pierre, the first known seigneur (or sire) of La Trémoïlle, was settled in Poitou, and died after 1040. His descendant, Guy, accompanied Godefroy de Bouillon to the Holy Land as a crusader in 1096. Upon his return, he had the abbey of Reims rebuilt, and died after 1145. His son, Guillaume, joined the expedition of Louis VII of France to the Holy Land as a crusader. Guillaume's great-grandson, Thibaut, crusaded alongside St. Louis, and was killed, along with three of his sons, on 8 February 1250 in battle at Mansoura in Egypt.

In 1269 another Guy de La Trémoïlle, who is numbered "I" in the family lineage, paid homage to his liege, Alphonse, Count of Poitou, and died sometime after 1301. Guy IV (d. 1350), predeceased his father, Guy III, having been designated Grand Panetier of France. His son, Guy V (1346–1398), was called "The Valiant" according to Père Anselme, being a renowned warrior, the confidante of Philip the Hardy of Burgundy, and later counselor in the service of Charles VI of France, whose Oriflamme he carried into battle against the English in 1382. He journeyed with Louis II, Duke of Bourbon on crusade to Africa, and died in Rhodes en route to France, having been ransomed in 1396 following imprisonment at Nicopolis. His son George (1382–1444), became Grand Chamberlain of France in 1406 and husband in 1416 of Joan II, Countess of Auvergne, thereby also acquiring the counties of Boulogne and Guînes. His rivalry with Arthur de Richemont, rather than hostility to Joan of Arc, is believed to have slowed her crusade's momentum against the English, allowing them to capture and burn her at the stake in 1431. His family's rise to wealth and power made him a target, and he was ransomed after capture thrice; after the Battle of Agincourt, once again by the English, and at Chinon, whence he was taken from the king's side and held prisoner at Montrésor.

His grandson Louis II (1460–1525), commanded French troops in the conquest of Lombardy for Louis XII. Defeated and wounded fighting the Swiss at Novarra in 1513, he redeemed his reputation by raising the siege of Marseille against the Constable de Bourbon's Imperial troops in 1523 before being killed at the Battle of Pavia in 1525. In 1485 he had wed the princesse du sang Gabrielle de Bourbon, daughter of Louis I, comte de Montpensier, subsequently marrying the daughter of Cesare Borgia. He inherited from his mother Marguerite d'Amboise, Vicomtesse de Thouars, the title, "Prince of Talmond" (prince de Talmond), which Du Cange noted, in his Glossarium mediæ et infimæ latinitatis, had become attached to an allodial seigneurie in the Vendée. It was his grandson, François de La Trémoïlle (1505–1541), who succeeded Louis II in his titles, his father Charles, Prince of Talmond (1486–1515), having been killed at the Battle of Marignano. He was taken prisoner at the battle of Pavia at which his grandfather was killed, but was subsequently ransomed. François wed the heiress Anne de Laval in 1521, who eventually brought to their descendants the pretendership to a royal throne. Their two younger sons, George (died 1584) and Claude (died 1566) founded, respectively, the branches of the marquis d'Royan (extinct 1698) and of the Dukes of Noirmoutier (Ducs de Noirmoutier) (extinct 1733).

The eldest son of François de La Trémoïlle, Louis III (1521–1577), was the first of his family to obtain ducal status when Charles IX conferred that honor upon him in 1563. His son with Jeanne de Montmorency, Claude (1566–1604), had the dukedom elevated into a peerage in 1595, although it was not registered as hereditary in the Parlement until 1599. He had converted to Protestantism and fought for the Huguenots during the French Wars of Religion at the battles of Coutras in 1587, Ivry in 1590 and Fontaine-Française in 1595, and at the sieges of Paris and Rouen. In 1598 he married Charlotte Brabantine of Orange-Nassau (1580–1631), daughter of the Protestant Dutch leader William the Silent. Claude's sister, Charlotte Catherine de La Trémoille (d. 1619), married Henri I de Bourbon, Prince of Condé (1552–1588) in 1586, but when he died suddenly six months before the birth of their only son in September 1588, she was imprisoned on suspicion of having poisoned her husband to prevent the child's rejection as a bastard, although the king recognized the child as premier prince du sang and heir presumptive to the crown until the birth of his own son, the future Louis XIII, in 1601.

The 3rd Duke of Thouars, Henri (1599–1674), was present at the Siege of La Rochelle in October 1628, after which he was obliged to abjure Protestantism for Catholicism while face-to-face with the victorious Cardinal Richelieu. He fought for France thereafter, at Pas-de-Suze in 1629, at the siege of Corbie in 1636, and was wounded at Carignano in 1629. Of his marriage with his cousin in 1619, Marie de La Tour d'Auvergne (1601–1665), daughter of Henri, Duke of Bouillon, was born Henri-Charles de La Trémoïlle (1620–1672), 4th Duke of Thouars and Prince of Tarente. He lived much of his life outside of France, serving as a cavalry general in the service of the Estates of Holland and holding the post of governor of Bois-le-Duc. He married a German princess, Emilie of Hesse-Cassel (1626–1693), in 1648, and only returned to France and converted to Catholicism two years before his death, in September 1670. His great-grandson, Charles Armand René de La Trémoïlle (1683–1719) became the 7th Duke of Thouars in father-to-son succession. He received the position of Premier Gentilhomme de la Chambre du Roi, which had become a family sinecure. In 1725 he married his cousin, Marie Hortense de La Tour d'Auvergne (1704–1788), daughter of Emmanuel-Théodose, Duke of Bouillon.

== Claim to Kingdom of Naples ==
In the 17th century the La Trémoïlle family put forth a claim to the throne of the Kingdom of Naples. Henry de La Trémoïlle, in representation of his great-grandmother Anne de Laval (1505–1554), wife of François de la Trémoïlle, was the sole heir to King Frederick of Naples. Ferdinand I (1423–1494), an illegitimate son of King Alfonso V of Aragon, managed to become king of Naples in 1458, although upon his death his son Alfonso II (1452–1504) was driven out by France. Alfonso II's only legitimate child, Charlotte (1480–1506), was married in 1500 to Nicolas de Montmorency, comte de Laval. Her younger daughter Anne married in 1521 Louis I de La Trémoïlle, vicomte de Thouars. By this connection the La Trémoïlle claimed the title "Prince of Tarento", along with the inheritance of Montmorency-Laval (it had passed to the Rieux family on the death of Guy XVI in 1531, then through Claude de Rieux, comtesse de Laval et Montfort, to François de Coligny in 1547, and on the death in 1605 of his grandson Guy XX, to the La Trémoïlle). Henri-Charles (1599–1674), Duke of Thouars, received royal confirmation of the rank of foreign prince in 1651; he bore as arms Quarterly Or a chevron gules between three eagles azure (La Trémoïlle), France, Bourbon-Montpensier and Montmorency-Laval. His eldest son Charles-Belgique-Hollande (1655–1709) bore Quarterly France and Two-Sicilies, over all La Trémoïlle, the younger son Frédéric-Guillaume (d. 1739) was titled Prince of Talmond; he acquired the Lordship of Châtellerault and had it raised to a dukedom for his son in 1730, but the latter died without issue in 1759 and the title of Talmond returned to the eldest branch. The 13th and last Duke of Thouars, 13th Prince of Tarente and 17th Prince of Talmond, died in 1933.

In 1643 he asserted his rights to that crown jure uxoris, and his descendants would continue to do so at various diplomatic conferences, in vain. Louis XIII, however, recognized the Duke of La Trémoïlle's assumption of "Prince of Taranto" as a title of pretence and, by patent issued in 1629, granted him and his family the rank and prerogatives of princes étrangers at the French court.

In 1648, Louis XIV allowed him to send a representative in presented their claims before the Congress of Munster, where the Treaty of Westphalia was concluded. The princes de Tarente also sought to their dynastic rights recognized at the congresses of Munster, Nijmegen and Ryswyk, but without success. On November 6, 1748, the La Trémoïlle family made a final protest concerning their rights to the kingdom of Naples which had been yielded by the Treaty of Vienna of 1738 to the King of Sicily.

== Extinction ==
Louis Jean Marie de La Trémoille (8 February 1910 – 9 December 1933), Prince and 12th Duke of La Trémoille, 13th Duke of Thouars, 13th Prince of Tarente and 17th Prince of Talmond, was the only son and heir of Louis Charles de La Trémoïlle, 12th Duke of Thouars and 12th Prince of Taranto, and was the last male of the historic La Trémoille family. He died, unmarried and childless, at the age of 23 at the estate of Leander J. McCormick (son of L. Hamilton McCormick) in Whitchurch, Hampshire. It was noted in the New York Times at the time that his mysterious death by fire in England evoked the martyrdom at English hands of Joan of Arc five centuries earlier, who had been betrayed by the young Duke's ancestor, Georges de La Trémoïlle, founder of the family's fortune in France.

Although the 1944 Almanach de Gotha states that his successor, as 14th Duchess of Thouars, was the eldest of his four sisters, Charlotte (1892–1971), the Genealogisches Handbuch des Adels of 1991 refrains from doing so, a 1959 ruling of the French courts having found that hereditary titles may only be transmitted "male-to-male" in "modern law". The original grant of the Dukedom, in July 1563 by Charles IX, stipulated that it was heritable by both male and female successors, although when erected into a pairie by Henry IV in 1599, the letters patent restricted succession to the peerage—but not the dukedom—to male heirs, restrictions inapplicable to the title of pretence, Prince of Taranto, traditionally borne by the representative heir to the historical throne of Naples, which was heritable in the female line.

The only son of the 1910 marriage of Charlotte de La Trémoïlle with Prince Henri Florent de Ligne (1881–1967), head of the Antoing cadet branch of that princely family, had de La Trémoïlle appended to his own surname in the Kingdom of Belgium as "Jean Charles, Prince de Ligne de La Trémoille" (1911–2005) on 20 December 1934, and his only son, Prince Charles-Antoine (born 1946), bears the same title and name.

== Lineage ==
- Gui VI de La Trémoille (c. 1346–1397)
  - Georges de La Trémoille (c. 1382–1446)
    - Louis I de la Trémoille (c. 1429–1483)
      - Louis II de la Trémoille (1460–1525)
        - Charles I de la Trémoille (1485–1515)
          - François de La Trémoille, Viscount of Thouars (1505–1541)
            - Louis de La Trémoille, 1st Duke of Thouars (1521–1577)
              - Claude de La Trémoille, 2nd Duke of Thouars (1566–1604)
                - Henri de La Trémoille, 3rd Duke of Thouars (1598–1674)
                  - Henri Charles de La Trémoille, 4th Duke of Thouars (1622–1672)
                    - Charles Belgique Hollande de La Trémoïlle (1655–1709)
                      - Marie Armande de La Trémoille (1677–1717)
                      - Charles Louis Bretagne de La Trémoille, 6th Duke of Thouars (1683–1719)
                        - Charles Armand René de La Trémoille (1708–1741)
                          - Jean Bretagne Charles de La Trémoille (1737–1792)
                            - Charles Bretagne Marie de La Trémoille, 9th Duke of Thouars (1764–1839)
                              - Louis Charles de La Trémoille (1838–1911)
                                - Louis Charles Marie de La Trémoille, 10th Duke of Thouars (1863–1921)
                                  - Charlotte de La Trémoille (1892–1971)
                                  - Louis Jean Marie de La Trémoille (1910–1933)
                            - Antoine Philippe de La Trémoille (1765–1794)
                    - Charlotte Amélie de La Trémoille (1652–1732)
                  - Marie Charlotte de La Trémoille (1632–1682)
                - Charlotte de La Trémoille (1599–1664)
              - Charlotte Catherine de La Trémoille (1568–1629)
            - Claude de La Trémoille (died 1566)
              - François II de La Trémoille (died 1608)
                - Louis I de La Trémoille (1586–1613)
                  - Louis II de La Trémoille (1612–1666)
                    - Marie Anne de La Trémoille (1642–1722)
                    - Joseph-Emmanuel de La Trémoille (1659–1720)
    - Georges II de La Trémoille (c. 1437–1481)
  - Jean de la Trémoille (1377–1449)

== Chief line ==
Viscounts of Thouars (elevated to Duke 1563), Princes of Talmont, etc.

- Louis I de La Trémoille
- Louis II de La Trémoille (1460–1525), son, called the chevalier sans reproche ("knight beyond reproach"), defeated and captured Francis II, Duke of Brittany at the Battle of Saint-Aubin-du-Cormier (1488), distinguished himself in the Italian Wars, and was killed at the Battle of Pavia (1525).
- Charles I de La Trémoille, son, died in his father's lifetime and under his command at the Battle of Marignano (1515).
- François II de La Trémoille (1505–1541), son, acquired a claim on the Kingdom of Naples by his marriage with Anne de Laval, daughter of Charlotte of Aragon
- Louis III de La Trémoille (1521–1577), son, became Duke of Thouars in 1563, and his son
  - Charlotte Catherine de La Trémoille, princesse de Condé (1568–1629), daughter of the above
- Claude de La Trémoille (1566–1604), son, turned Protestant, was created a peer of France in 1595, and married a daughter of William the Silent in 1598.
  - Charlotte de La Trémoille, Countess of Derby, daughter
- Henri de La Trémoille, son of Claude, 3rd Duke of Thouars (died 1674)
- Henri Charles de La Trémoille, son of Henry (died 1672)
- Charles Belgique Hollande de La Trémoille, son of Henry, 4th Duke of Thouars (died 1709)
  - Marie Armande Victoire de La Trémoille, daughter of the above, wife of Emmanuel Théodose de La Tour d'Auvergne
- Charles Louis Bretagne de La Trémoille, son of Charles-Belgique, 5th Duke of Thouars (died 1719)
- Charles Armand René de La Trémoille, son of Charles-Louis, 6th Duke of Thouars (died 1741)
- Jean Bretagne Charles de La Trémoille, son of Charles-Armand, 7th Duke of Thouars (died 1792)
- Charles Bretagne Marie de La Trémoille, son of Jean-Bretagne, 8th Duke of Thouars (died 1839)
- Louis Charles de La Trémoille, son of Charles-Bretagne, 9th Duke of Thouars (died 1911)
- Louis Charles Marie de La Trémoille, son of Louis-Charles, 10th Duke of Thouars (died 1921)
- Louis Jean Marie de La Trémoille, son of Louis-Charles-Marie, 11th Duke of Thouars (died without issue 1933)

After the male family line died out in 1933, it was the female heirs of the last Duke that have kept the La Trémoïlle surname alive in both France and Belgium.

== Branches ==
The family was divided into several branches including, among others:

- Viscounts and Dukes of Thouars
- Dukes of La Trémoïlle
- Marquess of La Trémoïlle
- Counts of La Tremoïlle
- Countess of La Tremoïlle
- Princes of Talmont
- Princes of Tarente
- Dukes of Châtellerault
- Dukes of Noirmoutier
- Marquess of Royan
- Count of Joigny

== Notable family members ==
- Guy de la Trémoille, standard-bearer of France, was taken prisoner at the Battle of Nicopolis (1396), and
- Georges de la Trémoille (c. 1382–1446) was Count of Guînes, the favorite of King Charles VII of France, took part in the Praguerie and was captured at Battle of Azincourt (1415).
- Jean de la Trémoille (1377-1449)
- Louis II de La Trémoille (1612–1666)
- Marie Anne de La Trémoille, princesse des Ursins (1642–1722)
- Joseph-Emmanuel de La Trémoille (1659–1720), Cardinal
