= Louis Charles Marie de La Trémoille, 10th Duke of Thouars =

French nobleman

Louis Charles Marie de La Trémoille
- 10th Duke of Thouars (more...)

10th Duke of Thouars
- period: 4 July 1911 – 17 June 1921
- Predecessor: Louis Charles de La Trémoille
- Successor: Louis Jean Marie de La Trémoille
- Born: 28 March 1863; Paris, Empire of France (now French Fifth Republic)
- Died: 17 June 1921 (aged 58); Paris
- Noble family: La Trémoille
- Spouses: Hélène Marie Léonie Pillet-Will (m. 1892–1921; his death)
- Issue: Charlotte, 12th Duchess of Thouars; Marguerite, Duchess of Blacas; Hélène, Duchess of La Roche-Guyon; Antoinette, Duchess of Ursel; Louis Jean Marie de La Trémoille, 11th Duke of Thouars
- Father: Louis Charles de La Trémoille, 9th Duke of Thouars
- Mother: Marguerite Jeanne Tanneguy-Duchâtel

Louis Charles Marie de La Trémoille, 10th Duke of Thouars (28 March 1863 – 17 June 1921), 10th Duke of Thouars, 16th Count of Laval was a French nobleman.

== Early life ==
Trémoille was born on 28 March 1863 in Paris, Empire of France. He was the son of Louis Charles de La Trémoille and his wife Marguerite Églé Jeanne Caroline Duchâtel (daughter of Count Charles Marie Tanneguy Duchâtel and his wife Rosalie (née "Eglé") Paulée).

== Career ==
La Trémoille was a deputy for Gironde from 1906 to 1919, and mayor of Margaux from 1904 to 1919. He was a member of the democratic left.

== Personal life ==
On 1 February 1892, he married Hélène Marie Léonie Pillet-Will (1875–1964), the daughter of Count Frédéric Pillet-Will and his wife, Jeanne Marie Clotilde Briatte. Together, they had five children:

- Princess Charlotte (1892–1971), who married Prince Henri Florent Lamoral of Ligne.
- Princess Marguerite (1894–1939), who married the Duke of Blacas, Stanislas de Blacas d'Aulps (1885–1941)
- Princess Hélène (1899–1972), who married Gilbert de La Rochefoucauld, Duke of La Roche-Guyon (1889–1964)
- Princess Antoinette (1904–1996), who married Belgian film director and writer Henri, 8th Duke d'Ursel.
- Prince Louis Jean Marie (1910–1933), his successor.

Louis died on 17 June 1921 in Paris. As his son Louis was killed in a fire at the estate of L. Hamilton McCormick in Whitchurch, Hampshire in 1933, his daughter Charlotte then inherited his titles, however, this has been disputed.

=== Descendants ===
Through his daughter Princess Charlotte, he was a grandfather of Prince Jean Charles Lamoral of Ligne-La Trémoïlle (himself the father of Princess Hedwige de Ligne, who married the Prince of Mérode and were parents of Prince Emmanuel de Merode; and Prince Charles-Antoine Lamoral of Ligne-La Trémoïlle).

Through his daughter Princess Antoinette, he was a grandfather of Antonin, 9th Duke d'Ursel.

Louis Charles Marie de La Trémoille La Trémoille family Born: 28 March 1863 Died: 17 June 1921
French nobility
Preceded by Louis Charles de La Trémoille	Duke of Thouars, et cetera 4 July 1911 – 17 June 1921	Succeeded by Louis Jean Marie de La Trémoille
Political offices
Vacant	Mayor of Margaux; 1904–1919	Vacant
Vacant	Deputy of Gironde; 6 May 1906 – 7 December 1919	Vacant
