= Peter Forbes, 10th Earl of Granard =

British peer

The Right Honourable The Earl of Granard

Member of the House of Lords (Note: As Baron Granard.)
- Lord Temporal
- In office 19 November 1992 – 11 November 1999 as a hereditary peer
- Preceded by: The 9th Earl of Granard
- Succeeded by: Seat abolished (Note: Pursuant to the House of Lords Act 1999.)

Personal details
- Born: Peter Arthur Edward Hastings Forbes; 15 March 1957 (age 69)
- Parents: Hon. John Forbes; Joan Smith

Peter Arthur Edward Hastings Forbes, 10th Earl of Granard (born 15 March 1957), is an Irish peer.

== Early life ==
Lord Granard was born as Peter Arthur Edward Hastings Forbes on 15 March 1957. He was the only son of The Honourable John Forbes (1920–1982), a Flight Lieutenant of the Royal Air Force, and the former Joan Smith. He has three older sisters, Susan Forbes, Patricia Moira Forbes and Caroline Mary Forbes.

His paternal grandparents were the 8th Earl of Granard and Beatrice, Countess of Granard (née Mills), an American socialite who was the daughter of Ogden Mills and a descendant of the Livingston and the Schuyler families of New York. On his father's side, he had two aunts, Eileen, Lady Bute, of Scotland, and Moira, Countess Rossi, of Switzerland. His mother was the third daughter of A. Edward Smith of Sherlockstown House in County Kildare.

Lord Granard was educated at Eton College.

== Career ==
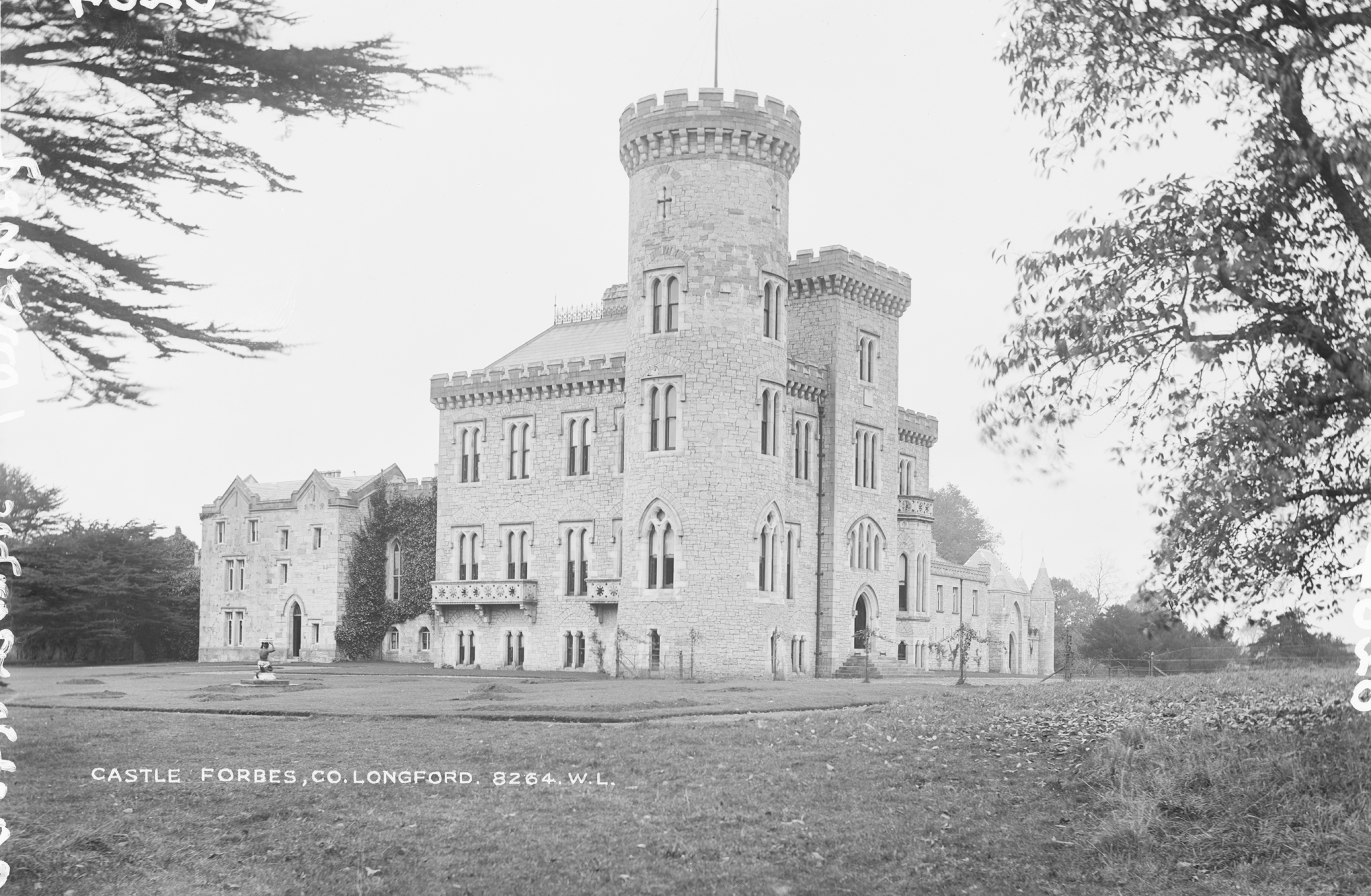
Castle Forbes in County Longford.

Upon the death of his uncle, the 9th Earl of Granard, who died on 21 November 1992 without male issue, he succeeded as the 10th Earl of Granard, 10th Viscount Granard, 10th Baron Clanehugh, 5th Baron Granard of Castle Donington, and 11th Baronet Forbes of Castle Forbes.

== Personal life ==
On 1 September 1980, Lord Granard married Nora Anne Mitchell, a daughter of Robert Mitchell of Portarlington, County Laois. Together, they are the parents of four children:

- Jonathan Peter Hastings Forbes, Viscount Forbes (b. 1981)
- Hon. David Robert Hastings Forbes (b. 1984)
- Lady Lisa Ann Forbes (b. 1986)
- Hon. Edward Hastings Forbes (b. 1989)

The family seat is Castle Forbes, near Newtownforbes, the largest estate in County Longford.

== Coat of arms ==
Coat of arms of Peter Forbes, 10th Earl of Granard
Coronet A coronet of an Earl Crest Azure three Bears' Heads couped Argent muzzled Gules. Escutcheon A Bear statant Argent guttée de sang muzzled Gules. Supporters Dexter: a Unicorn Erminois armed maned tufted and unguled Or; Sinister: a Dragon wings expanded Ermine. Motto Fax Mentis Incendium Gloriae (The incitement to glory is the firebrand of the mind)

== Notes ==
Peerage of Ireland
Preceded by Arthur Forbes	Earl of Granard; 1992–present	Incumbent; Heir apparent: Jonathan Forbes, Viscount Forbes
Preceded by Arthur Forbes	Viscount Granard; 1992–present	Incumbent; Heir apparent: Jonathan Forbes, Viscount Forbes
Preceded by Arthur Forbes	Baron Clanehugh; 1992–present	Incumbent; Heir apparent: Jonathan Forbes, Viscount Forbes
Peerage of the United Kingdom
Preceded by Arthur Forbes	Baron Granard; 1992–present Member of the House of Lords (1992–1999)	Incumbent; Heir apparent: Jonathan Forbes, Viscount Forbes
Baronetage of Nova Scotia
Preceded by Arthur Forbes	Baronet of Castle Forbes; 1992–present	Incumbent; Heir apparent: Jonathan Forbes, Viscount Forbes
