= Louis Jean Marie de La Trémoille =

French aristocrat

Louis Jean Marie de La Trémoïlle
- 11th Duke of Thouars (more...)

Duke of Thouars
- period: 17 June 1921 - 9 December 1933
- Predecessor: Louis Charles Marie de La Trémoille
- Successor: Charlotte de La Trémoille
- Born: 8 February 1910; Paris, French Third Republic (now French Fifth Republic)
- Died: 9 December 1933 (aged 23); Whitchurch, Hampshire, England, United Kingdom
- Noble family: La Trémoille
- Father: Louis Charles Marie de La Trémoille, 10th Duke of Thouars
- Mother: Hélène Marie Léonie Pillet-Will

Prince Louis Jean Marie de La Trémoïlle, 11th Duke of Thouars (8 February 1910 – 9 December 1933) was a French aristocrat. He was the 11th Duke of Thouars and 10th Duke of La Trémoïlle, 13th Prince of Tarente, 17th Prince of Talmond and 17th Count of Laval

== Biography ==
The son of Louis Charles, 10th duc de Thouars and his wife, Hélene Pillet-Will (heiress of Count Frédéric Pillet-Will, the Parisian banker who bought the Château Margaux wine label in 1879), La Trémoïlle was a member of the 1er régiment de chasseurs d'Afrique, a French army regiment.

He was killed in a fire at the estate of Leander J. McCormick in Whitchurch, Hampshire, England, at the age of 23. Some noted at the time that his mysterious death by fire in England evoked the martyrdom at English hands of Joan of Arc five centuries earlier, who had been betrayed by the young duke's ancestor Georges de la Trémoille, founder of the fortune of the House of La Trémoïlle. He died unmarried and left no known descendants.

== Heritage ==
Although the 1944 Almanach de Gotha states that his successor as 14th duchesse de Thouars was the eldest of his four sisters, Charlotte (1892–1971), the Genealogisches Handbuch des Adels of 1991 refrains from doing so, a 1959 ruling of the French courts having found that hereditary titles may only be transmitted "male-to-male" in "modern law". (The original grant of the dukedom, in July 1563 by Charles IX, stipulated that it was heritable by both male and female successors, although when erected into a pairie by King Henri le Grand in 1599, the letters patent restricted succession to the peerage — but not the dukedom — to male heirs).

The duke's nephew, Jean Charles Lamoral, as the only son of his eldest sister, had de La Trémoille appended to his own princely surname in the Kingdom of Belgium as "Prince de Ligne de La Trémoille" on 20 December 1934. The latter's only son, Charles Antoine, bears the same title and name.

Prince Louis Jean Marie de La Trémoille La Trémoille Family Born: 8 February 1910 Died: 9 December 1933
French nobility
Preceded by Louis Charles Marie de La Trémoille	Duke of Thouars, et cetera 17 June 1921 – 9 December 1933	Succeeded by Princess Charlotte de La Trémoille (Disputed)
