= Arthur Forbes, 9th Earl of Granard =

British peer

The Right Honourable The Earl of Granard AFC

Member of the House of Lords (Note: As Baron Granard.)
- Lord Temporal
- In office 10 September 1948 – 21 November 1992
- Preceded by: The 8th Earl of Granard
- Succeeded by: The 10th Earl of Granard

Personal details
- Born: Arthur Patrick Hastings Forbes; 10 April 1915
- Died: 21 November 1992 (aged 77)
- Parents: Bernard Forbes, 8th Earl of Granard; Beatrice Mills

Arthur Patrick Hastings Forbes, 9th Earl of Granard (10 April 1915 – 21 November 1992), was a British peer.

== Early life ==
Born on 10 April 1915, he was the son of Bernard Forbes, 8th Earl of Granard (1874–1948), and Beatrice (née Mills) Forbes, Countess of Granard (1883–1972), an American socialite who was the daughter of Ogden Mills and a descendant of the Livingston and the Schuyler families from New York. He had one younger brother, the Hon. John Forbes, and two sisters, Eileen, Lady Bute, of Scotland, and Moira, Countess Rossi, of Switzerland.

He was educated at Eton and Trinity College, Cambridge. He received a BA from Cambridge University in 1937.

== Career ==
Early in the Second World War, on 31 October 1939, he was appointed Air Attaché to Romania, being given the rank of Wing Commander. He used his own aircraft, a Percival Q6, to fly, often secretly, British subjects and other diplomats who had escaped from Poland during the German invasion from Cernăuți in Northern Romania (now Chernivtsi in Ukraine) to Bucharest and on to Greece or Turkey. On 30 October 1940, he was appointed deputy Air Attaché to Greece. Later in the war, he acted as an adviser to the Minister of State for the Middle East. After the war, he was appointed Air Attaché to France. His decorations included the British Air Force Cross, the French Legion of Honor and the American Legion of Merit.

From 1972 to 1990, he was a director of Texaco. Lord Granard also served as a director for other companies, including the Nabisco Group Ltd. and Martini & Rossi.

== Personal life ==
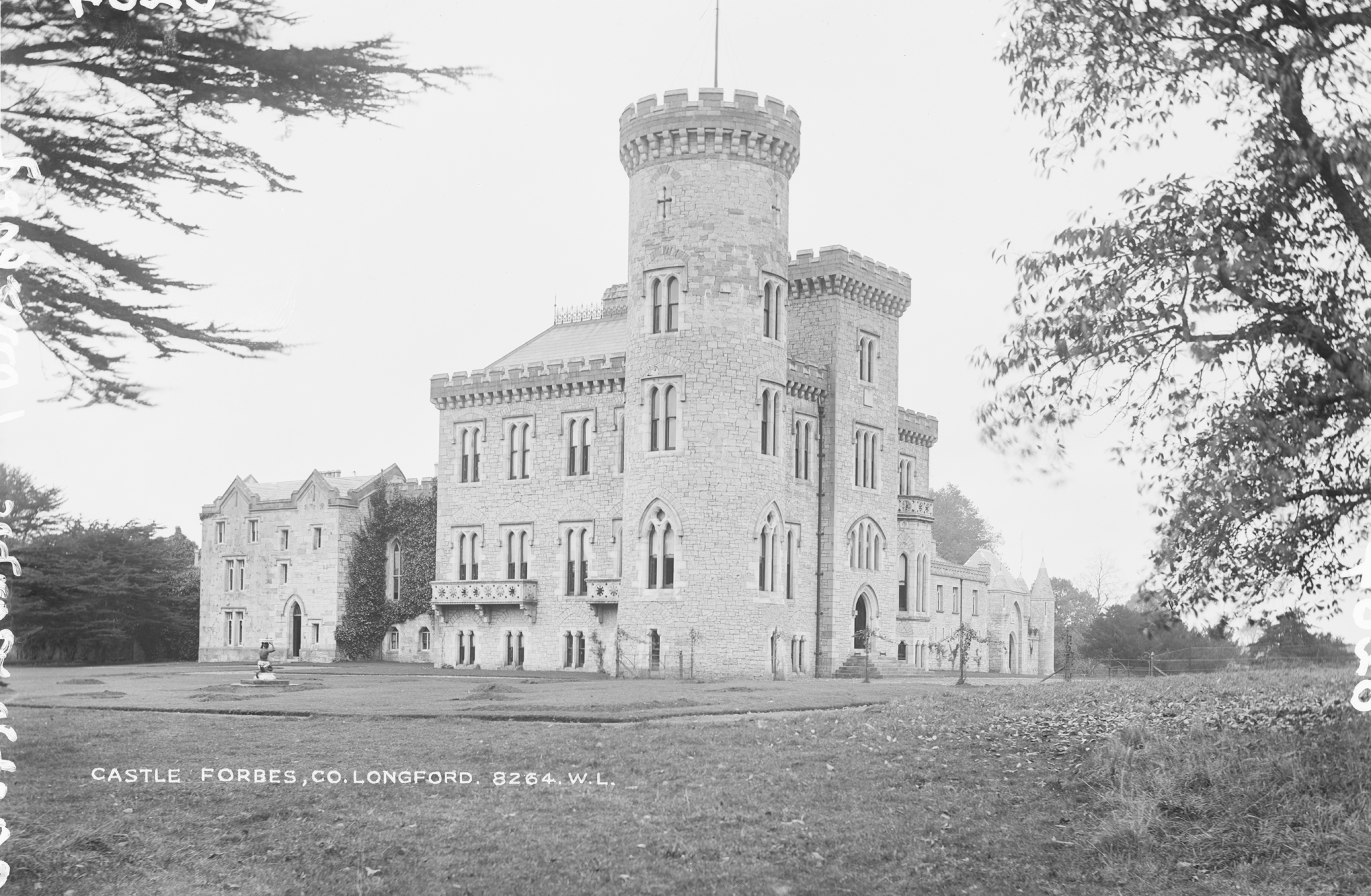
Castle Forbes

Lord Granard was married to Marie-Madeleine Eugenie, Princess of Faucigny Lucinge, (d. 1990). She was the daughter of Jean Maurel and the first wife of Prince Humbert de Faucigny-Lucinge (a brother of Prince de Cystria, both descendants of Louis IX of France). Together, Marie and Lord Granard lived at Castleforbes demesne, the largest estate in County Longford, and were the parents of two children:

- Lady Moira Forbes (b. 1951), who married Prince Charles-Antoine Lamoral de Ligne-La Trémoïlle, son of Prince Jean Charles Lamoral of Ligne-La Trémoïlle, in February 1971. They divorced in 1975 and she married, secondly, José de Guerrico Casado-Sastre in 1978.
- Lady Georgina Forbes (b. 1952), an owner of international showjumping horses.

The Earl of Granard died at his home in Morges, Switzerland, in 1992 at age 77. As he had no sons, his nephew Peter inherited the title and continues to be the holder.

== Coat of arms ==
Coat of arms of Arthur Forbes, 9th Earl of Granard
Coronet A coronet of an Earl Crest Azure three Bears' Heads couped Argent muzzled Gules. Escutcheon A Bear statant Argent guttée de sang muzzled Gules. Supporters Dexter: an Unicorn Erminois armed maned tufted and unguled Or; Sinister: a Dragon wings expanded Ermine. Motto Fax Mentis Incendium Gloriae (The incitement to glory is the firebrand of the mind)

== Notes ==
Peerage of Ireland
Preceded by Bernard Forbes	Earl of Granard; 1948–1992	Succeeded by Peter Forbes
Preceded by Bernard Forbes	Viscount Granard; 1948–1992	Succeeded by Peter Forbes
Preceded by Bernard Forbes	Baron Clanehugh; 1948–1992	Succeeded by Peter Forbes
Peerage of the United Kingdom
Preceded by Bernard Forbes	Baron Granard; 1948–1992; Member of the House of Lords (1948–1992)	Succeeded by Peter Forbes
Baronetage of Nova Scotia
Preceded by Bernard Forbes	Baronet of Castle Forbes; 1948–1992	Succeeded by Peter Forbes
