= Henri-Florent Lamoral =

Belgian nobleman

Prince Henri-Florent Lamoral
- Prince of Ligne; Duke of Thouars

Duke of Thouars
- period: 9 December 1933 - 15 May 1967
- Full name: Henri Florent Eugène François Joseph Lamoral de Ligne
- Born: 29 December 1881; Paris, French Third Republic (now French Fifth Republic)
- Died: 15 May 1967 (aged 85); Montreux, Canton of Vaud, Switzerland
- Noble family: Ligne
- Spouses: Princess Charlotte de La Trémoille, 12th Duchess of Thouars (m. 1910 - 1967; his death)
- Issue: Prince Jean Charles Lamoral de La Trémoïlle, 13th Duke of Thouars
- Father: Prince Charles of Ligne
- Mother: Charlotte de Gontaut-Biron

Prince Henri Florent Eugène François Joseph Lamoral de Ligne (29 December 1881 – 15 May 1967) was a Belgian nobleman, the son of Prince Charles Joseph Eugène Henri Georges Lamoral (1837–1914) (himself the son of Prince Eugène, 8th Prince of Ligne and his wife Nathalie de Trazegnies) and Charlotte de Gontaut-Biron (1854–1933), (herself the daughter of Étienne Charles de Gontaut, Marquis of Biron).

== Family ==
He married Princess Charlotte de La Trémoïlle (eldest daughter of Prince Louis Charles Marie de La Trémoille, 11th Duke of Thouars and his wife Hélène Marie Léonie Pillet-Will) and they had one son, Prince Jean Charles Lamoral.

In 1933, upon the accidental death of his wife’s childless younger brother, Prince Louis Jean Marie de La Trémoille, 12th Duke of Thouars, Prince Henri-Florent Lamoral became The Duke of Thouars as spouse of the now 13th Duchess, a title which was last held in the female form by his mother-in-law Princess Hélène, The Dowager Duchess of Thouars.

== Descendants ==
Prince Henri Florent Eugène François Joseph Lamoral de Ligne (1881-1967) ⚭ Princess Charlotte de La Trémoïlle

- Prince Jean Charles Lamoral of Ligne-La Trémoïlle (1911-2005)
  - Princess Hedwige de Ligne (1943-),
    married Charles-Guillaume, Prince de Merode, Marquis van Westerloo. (1940-)
    - Prince Emmanuel de Merode.
  - Charles-Antoine, Prince de Ligne-La Trémoïlle

Prince Henri-Florent Lamoral House of Ligne Born: 29 December 1881 Died: 15 May 1967
French nobility
Vacant Title last held by Hélène Marie Léonie Pillet-Will	Duke of Thouars; 9 December 1933 - 15 May 1967	Vacant Title next held by Maria del Rosario de Lambertye-Gerbeviller
