= La Trimouille =

- Commune
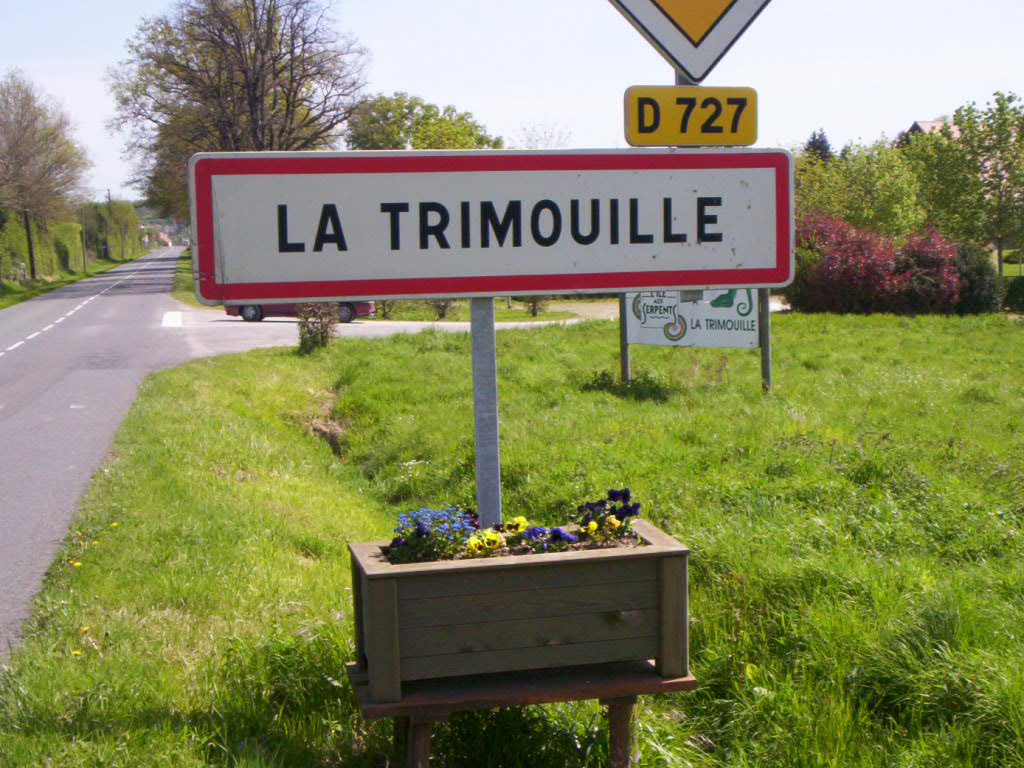
- Entering La Trimouille on the D727 road

- Coat of arms
- Location of La Trimouille
- Location within France Location within Nouvelle-Aquitaine
- Coordinates: 46°28′02″N 1°02′29″E
- Country: France
- Region: Nouvelle-Aquitaine
- Department: Vienne
- Arrondissement: Montmorillon
- Canton: Montmorillon

Government
  - Mayor (2020–2026): Brigitte Abaux
- Area^{1}: 41.65 km^{2} (16.08 sq mi)
- Elevation: 143 m (469 ft)
- Highest elevation: 183 m (600 ft)
- Lowest elevation: 97 m (318 ft)
- Population (2023): 859
  - Density: 20.6/km^{2} (53.4/sq mi)
- Time zone: UTC+01:00 (CET)
  - Summer (DST): UTC+02:00 (CEST)
- INSEE/Postal code: 86273 /86290
- ^{1} French Land Register data, which excludes lakes, ponds, glaciers > 1 km^{2} (0.386 sq mi or 247 acres) and river estuaries.

La Trimouille (French pronunciation: [la tʁimuj]) is a commune in the Vienne department and Nouvelle-Aquitaine region of western France.

== Geography ==
La Trimouille lies 13 km east of Montmorillon and 19 km south of Le Blanc. The area's main town, Poitiers, lies 55 km away to the west-north-west, while the principal town to the south is Limoges, 73 km away.

The river Benaize flows through La Trimouille.

== Demographics ==
Historical population
Year	Pop.	±% p.a.
1968	1,275	—
1975	1,257	−0.20%
1982	1,243	−0.16%
1990	1,130	−1.18%
1999	1,023	−1.10%
2007	966	−0.71%
2012	941	−0.52%
2017	889	−1.13%
2023	859	−0.57%
Source: INSEE

== See also ==
- Communes of the Vienne department
- La Trémoille family
