= Charles Sackville-Germain, 5th Duke of Dorset =

British courtier and Tory politician

His Grace The Duke of Dorset KG, PC
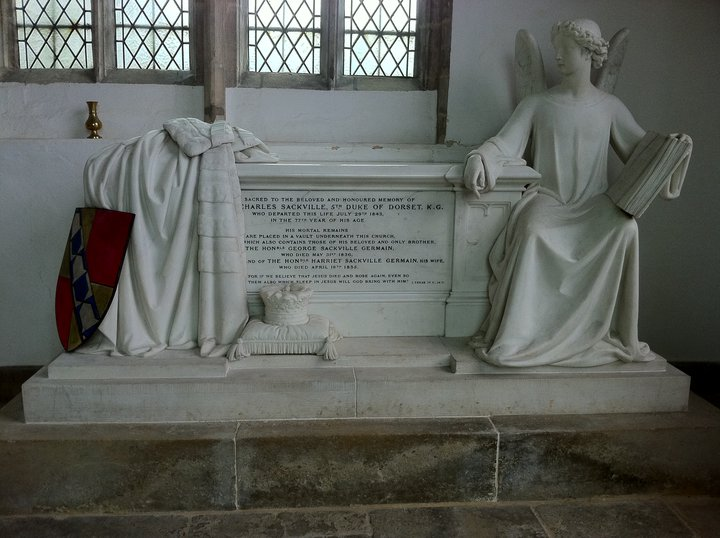
- Memorial to the Duke of Dorset in St Peter's Church, Lowick

Master of the Horse
- In office 12 December 1821 – 9 April 1827
- Monarch: George IV
- Prime Minister: The Earl of Liverpool
- Preceded by: The Duke of Montrose
- Succeeded by: The Duke of Leeds
- In office 1 January 1835 – 8 April 1835
- Monarch: William IV
- Prime Minister: Sir Robert Peel, Bt
- Preceded by: The Earl of Albemarle
- Succeeded by: The Earl of Albemarle

Personal details
- Born: 27 August 1767
- Died: 29 July 1843 (aged 75)
- Party: Tory
- Parent(s): George Germain, 1st Viscount Sackville; Diana Sambrooke

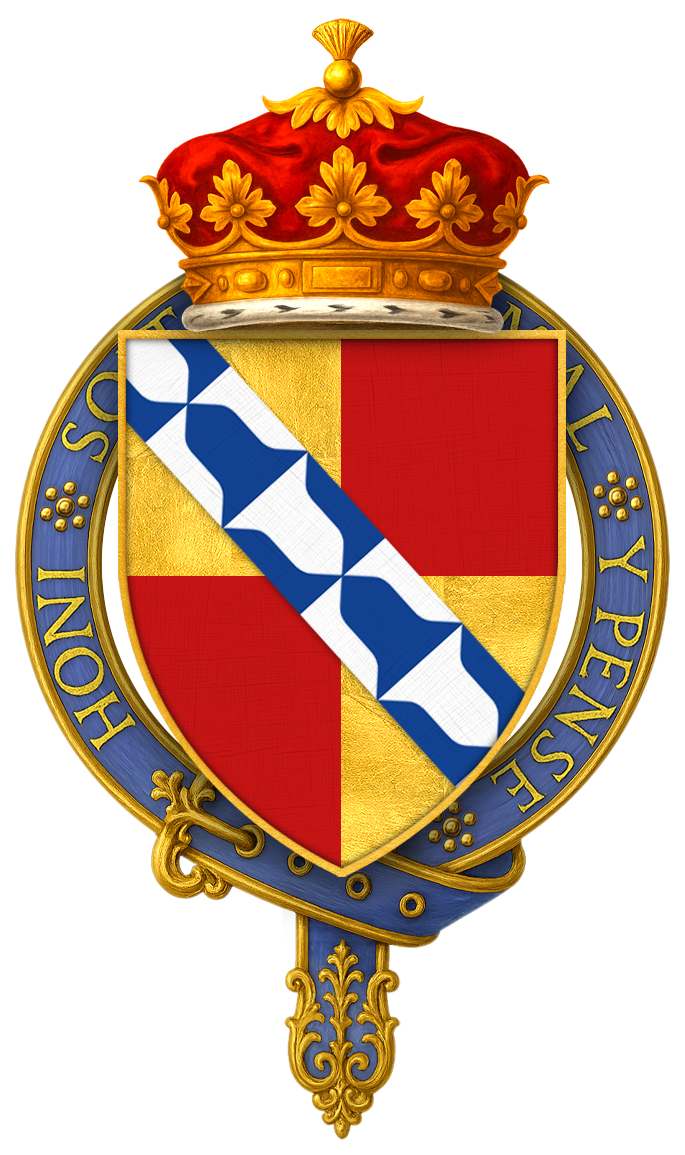
Garter-encircled arms of Charles Sackville-Germain, 5th Duke of Dorset, KG, PC

Charles Sackville-Germain, 5th Duke of Dorset, KG, PC (27 August 1767 – 29 July 1843), known as Charles Sackville between 1767 and 1770, as Charles Germain between 1770 and 1785, and as The Viscount Sackville between 1785 and 1815, was a British courtier and Tory politician. He served as Master of the Horse between 1821 and 1827 and again briefly in 1835.

== Background ==
Born Charles Sackville, he was the eldest son of Lord George Sackville. His father changed the family surname to Germain in 1770 and was created Viscount Sackville in 1782. Dorset re-incorporated the former surname as a double-barrelled one later in life.

== Career ==
Germain succeeded his father in the viscountcy in 1785, inheriting Drayton House. In 1815 he also succeeded his cousin in the dukedom of Dorset. In 1821 he was sworn of the Privy Council and appointed Master of the Horse under Lord Liverpool. Serving in that office until 1827 and again briefly under Sir Robert Peel from January to April 1835, he was also appointed a Knight of the Garter in 1826.

== Death and memorial ==
Dorset died unmarried and childless in 1843 and his titles, a viscountcy and dukedom, became extinct. His memorial is in St Peter's Church, Lowick, Northamptonshire – a black lettering-etched white marble chest-tomb by Richard Westmacott, large draped mantle, coronet on cushion with a human-size angel seated alongside, its only coloured feature is its shield.

== Estates ==
Charles had succeeded in 1785 to the vast bulk of the parish of Lowick, including the grand 13th-century-core Drayton House, replete with three towering eagles on top of its bulky gate posts. Drayton had come into the family from Sir John Germain, 1st Baronet, who died without issue in 1718, leaving it to his wife Lady Elizabeth Germain. On her death in 1769 Charles' father, Lord George Sackville (later created 1st Viscount Sackville), inherited the estate. He took her surname by Act of Parliament of 1770 and was seised of the additional manor of Lowick and right to nominate the parish priest (advowson) at the inclosure of the parish in 1771, when about 1,150 acres (4.7 km^{2}) were wholly privatized to him.

Charles was also dealing with five Northamptonshire manors by recovery in 1788 and 1791. He or his predecessor in the dukedom had in addition bought more modest nearby Pyels (a.k.a. Vaux) manor, Woodford, Northamptonshire between 1800 and 1843.

On his death in 1843, all the estates passed to his niece Mrs. Caroline Harriet Stopford Sackville (née Sackville) (died 1908) and had descended by 1930 into the hands of Nigel Victor Stopford Sackville, the only surviving son of her second son.

Political offices
Preceded by The Duke of Montrose	Master of the Horse; 1821–1827	Succeeded by The Duke of Leeds
Preceded by The Earl of Albemarle	Master of the Horse; January–April 1835	Succeeded by The Earl of Albemarle
Peerage of Great Britain
Preceded by George John Frederick Sackville	Duke of Dorset; 1815–1843	Extinct
Preceded by George Germain	Viscount Sackville; 1785–1843	Extinct
