= Isabella Orsini =

Italian actress (born 1974)

- Born: 2 December 1974 (age 51); Perugia, Italy
- Spouse: Prince Édouard Lamoral Rodolphe de Ligne-La Trémoïlle (m. 2009)
- Issue: Princess Althea de Ligne-La Trémoïlle; Princess Athénaïs de Ligne-La Trémoïlle; Prince Antoine de Ligne-La Trémoïlle
- House: House of Ligne (by marriage)
- Father: Mario Orsini
- Mother: Lolita Rossi
- Religion: Roman Catholicism
- Occupation: actress

Princess Isabella de Ligne-La Trémoïlle (née Orsini, born 2 December 1974) is an Italian actress. By marriage, she is a member of the House of Ligne, a Belgian noble family.

== Biography ==
Orsini was the daughter of a gallery owner and a court clerk, after graduating from classical high school she graduated in law in her city. She studied both in Italy and in the United States at the Actors Studio and following theatrical specialization courses with Bernard Hill in Los Angeles.

== Family ==
Orsini married in a civil ceremony on 2 September 2009 and in a religious ceremony on 5 September 2009, to Prince Édouard Lamoral Rodolphe de Ligne-La Trémoïlle (born 1976), at Antoing Castle in the Hainaut province of Belgium.

The couple's first child, Princess Althea Isabelle Sophie de Ligne-La Trémoïlle, was born on 12 May 2010 at the private "Villa Mafalda" clinic in Rome. On 9 May 2014, the couple had their second child, Princess Athénaïs Allegra Isabella de Ligne-La Trémoïlle at the American Hospital of Paris. On 10 January 2019, Orsini gave birth to the couple's third child, Prince Antoine Tau Édouard Adrien de Ligne-La Trémoïlle in Paris, France.

As Belgium is a monarchy which confers and recognises hereditary titles of nobility, the right of Orsini and her Ligne-La Trémoïlle children to the prefix of prince and princess and to the style of Highness is legal—not a courtesy title; all members of the House of Ligne have been entitled to princely rank and to the style of Highness (Altesse) in Belgium since 31 May 1923.

== Filmography ==
=== Cinema ===
- Bagnomaria, directed by Giorgio Panariello (1999)
- Apri gli occhi e... sogna, directed by Rosario Errico (2002) – in the role of Cinzia
- Velocità massima, directed by Daniele Vicari (2002)
- Ricordati di me, directed by Gabriele Muccino (2003) – in the role of Lucia
- Modena Modena, by Daniele Malavolta (2003) – Opera prima
- Intrigo a Cuba, directed by Riccardo Leoni (2004) – filmed in 1999
- Zorba Il Buddha, directed by Lakshen Sucameli (2004) – in the role of Niko
- September Eleven 1683, directed by Renzo Martinelli (2012)
- Young Perez, directed by Jacques Ouaniche (2013)
- The Twins, directed by Lamberto Bava (2016)

=== Television ===
- Il bello delle donne 2, directed by Gianni Dalla Porta, Luigi Parisi, Maurizio Ponzi and Giovanni Soldati – TV series – Canale 5 (2002)
- Il bello delle donne 3, directed by Maurizio Ponzi and Luigi Parisi – TV series – Canale 5 (2003)
- La palestra, directed by Pier Francesco Pingitore – TV miniseries – Canale 5 (2003)
- Luisa Sanfelice, directed by Fratelli Taviani – TV miniseries – Rai Uno (2004)
- Imperia, la grande cortigiana, directed by Pier Francesco Pingitore – TV film – Canale 5 (2005)
- Caterina e le sue figlie, directed by Fabio Jephcott – TV miniseries – Canale 5 (2005)
- L'onore e il rispetto, directed by Salvatore Samperi – TV miniseries – Canale 5 (2007)
- Il sangue e la rosa, directed by Salvatore Samperi, Luigi Parisi and Luciano Odorisio – TV miniseries – Canale 5 (2008)

=== Shorts ===
- Tre bicchieri di cristallo, directed by Alessandro Mistichelli – Prize for best actress
- De Pinga, directed by Simonluca Sacco – with Jonathan Borgogelli Braun
