= List of Masters of the Horse =

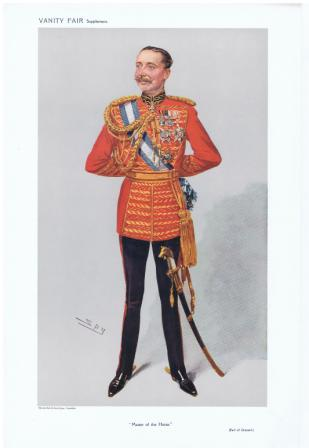
Bernard Forbes, 8th Earl of Granard, as Master of the Horse, 1908

The following list contains many of the people known to have held the office of Master of the Horse in England. Some official records are incomplete, and not all office holders are known.

== Masters of the Horse ==
=== 14th and 15th centuries ===
- John (de) Brocas, of Clewer. De facto Master of Horse to King Edward III. c.1360–1371
- Bernard Brocas 1371–
- Thomas de Murriex
- Thomas de Clifford, 6th Baron de Clifford 1388–1391
- John Russell 1391–1398
- Richard Redman 1399–1399
- Robert Waterton 1399–1405
- John Waterton 1413–1416
- Henry Noon
- Richard de Beauchamp, 13th Earl of Warwick
- Walter Beauchamp 1429–1430
- John Styward
- John Beauchamp, 1st Baron Beauchamp 1440–
- Thomas de Burgh <1454–?1479
- John Cheyne, Baron Cheyne 1475–1487
- Thomas Tyrrell 1483–1483
- James Tyrrell 1483–

=== 16th century ===
- Thomas Brandon c.1485–1510
- Thomas Knyvett 1510–1512
- Charles Brandon, 1st Duke of Suffolk 1513–1515
- Henry Guilford 1515–1522
- Nicholas Carew 1522–1539
- Anthony Browne 1539–1548
- William Herbert, 1st Earl of Pembroke 1548–1552
- John Dudley, 2nd Earl of Warwick 1552–1553
- Edward Hastings 1553–1556
- Henry Jerningham 1556–1558
- Lord Robert Dudley 1558–1587, created Earl of Leicester in 1564
- Robert Devereux, 2nd Earl of Essex 1587–1601

=== 17th century ===
- Edward Somerset, 4th Earl of Worcester (c. 1601–1616)
- George Villiers, 1st Duke of Buckingham (1616–1628), created Duke of Buckingham in 1623
- Henry Rich, 1st Earl of Holland (1628)
- James Hamilton, Marquess of Hamilton (1628–c. 1644), created Duke of Hamilton in 1643
- Prince Rupert of the Rhine (1653–1655), in exile
- John Claypole (1653–?1660), appointed by Oliver Cromwell during the Commonwealth
- George Monck, 1st Duke of Albemarle (1660–1668)
- George Villiers, 2nd Duke of Buckingham (1668–1674)
- James Scott, 1st Duke of Monmouth (1674–1679)
- In commission (1679–1681):
  - Stephen Fox
  - Richard Mason
  - Nicholas Armorer
  - Thomas Wyndham
  - Roger Pope
- Charles Lennox, 1st Duke of Richmond (1681–1685)
- Commissioners appointed during the Duke of Richmond's minority (1682–1685):
  - Henry Guy
  - Theophilus Oglethorpe
  - Charles Adderley
- George Legge, 1st Baron Dartmouth (1685–1689)
- Henry Overkirke (1689–1702)

=== 18th century ===
- In commission (1702):
  - Stephen Fox
  - Benjamin Bathurst
  - Hugh Chudleigh
- Charles Seymour, 6th Duke of Somerset (1702–1712)
- In commission (1712–1714):
  - Conyers Darcy
  - George Feilding
- Charles Seymour, 6th Duke of Somerset (1714–1715)
- In commission (1715–1717):
  - Conyers Darcy
  - Francis Negus
- In commission (1717–1727):
  - Francis Negus
- Richard Lumley, 2nd Earl of Scarbrough (1727–1735)
- Charles Lennox, 2nd Duke of Richmond (1735–1750)
- vacant
- Marquess of Hartington (1751–1755)
- Lionel Sackville, 1st Duke of Dorset (1755–1757)
- Granville Leveson-Gower, Earl Gower (1757–1760)
- Francis Hastings, 10th Earl of Huntingdon (1760–1761)
- John Manners, 3rd Duke of Rutland (1761–1766)
- Francis Seymour-Conway, Earl of Hertford (1766)
- Peregrine Bertie, 3rd Duke of Ancaster and Kesteven (1766–1778)
- Hugh Percy, 1st Duke of Northumberland (1778–1780)
- George Montagu, 1st Duke of Montagu (1780–1790)
- James Graham, 3rd Duke of Montrose (1790–1795)
- John Fane, 10th Earl of Westmorland (1795–1798)
- Philip Stanhope, 5th Earl of Chesterfield (1798–1804)

=== 19th century ===
- Francis Seymour-Conway, 2nd Marquess of Hertford (1804–1806)
- Henry Herbert, 1st Earl of Carnarvon (1806–1807)
- James Graham, 3rd Duke of Montrose (1807–1821)
- Charles Sackville-Germain, 5th Duke of Dorset (1821–1827)
- George Osborne, 6th Duke of Leeds (1827–1830)
- William Keppel, 4th Earl of Albemarle (1830–1834)
- Charles Sackville-Germain, 5th Duke of Dorset (1835)
- William Keppel, 4th Earl of Albemarle (1835–1841)
- George Child-Villiers, 5th Earl of Jersey (1841–1846)
- Henry Fitzalan-Howard, 13th Duke of Norfolk (1846–1852)
- George Child-Villiers, 5th Earl of Jersey (1852)
- Arthur Wellesley, 2nd Duke of Wellington (1853–1858)
- Henry Somerset, 8th Duke of Beaufort (1858–1859)
- George Brudenell-Bruce, 2nd Marquess of Ailesbury (1859–1866)
- Henry Somerset, 8th Duke of Beaufort (1866–1868)
- George Brudenell-Bruce, 2nd Marquess of Ailesbury (1868–1874)
- Orlando Bridgeman, 3rd Earl of Bradford (1874–1880)
- Hugh Grosvenor, 1st Duke of Westminster (1880–1885)
- Orlando Bridgeman, 3rd Earl of Bradford (1885–1886)
- Richard Boyle, 9th Earl of Cork (1886)
- William Cavendish-Bentinck, 6th Duke of Portland (1886–1892)
- William Monson, 1st Viscount Oxenbridge (1892–1894)
- Richard Boyle, 9th Earl of Cork (1894–1895)
- William Cavendish-Bentinck, 6th Duke of Portland (1895–1905)

=== 20th century ===
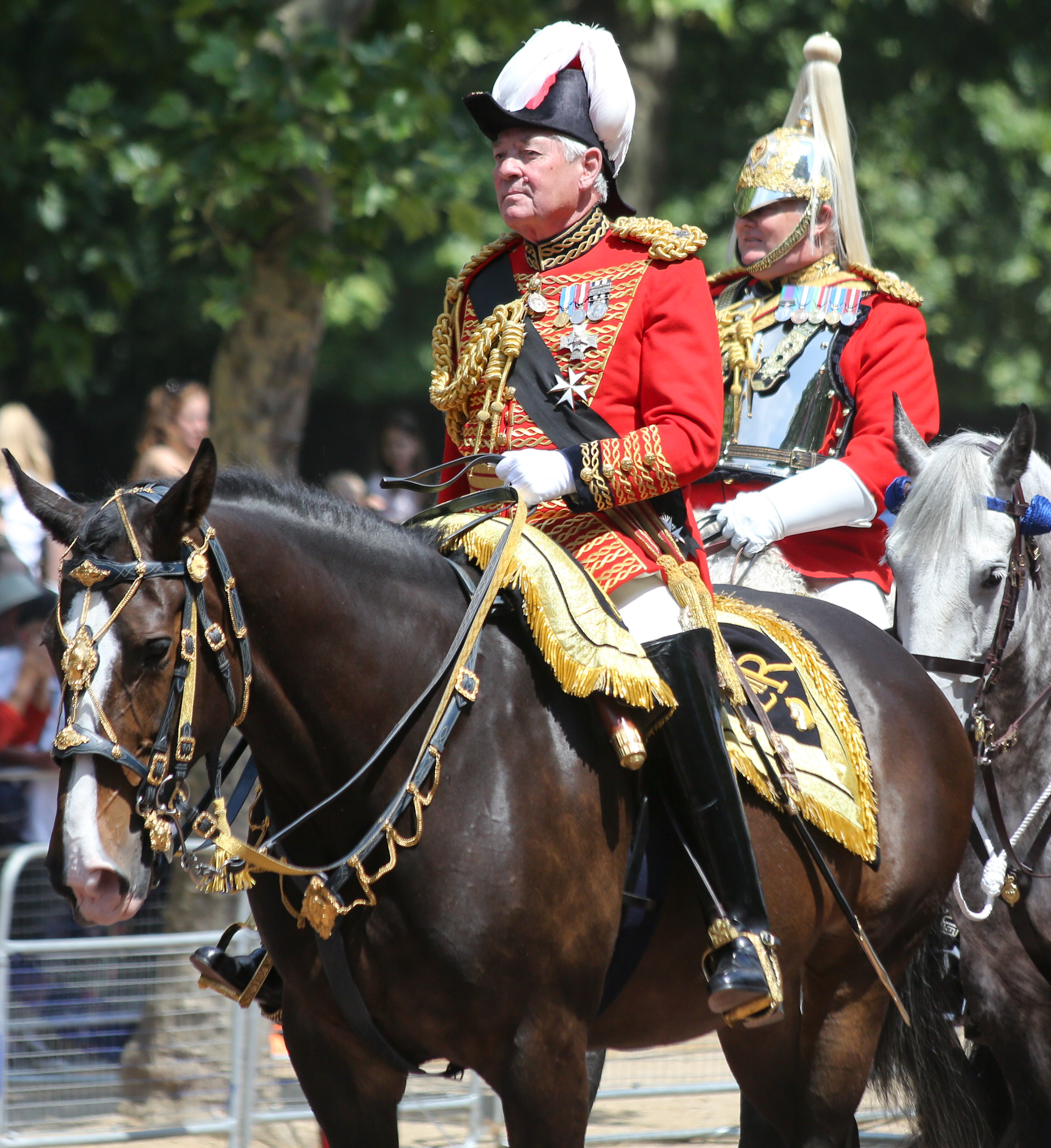
Samuel Vestey, 3rd Baron Vestey, as Master of the Horse in 2018

- Osbert Molyneux, 6th Earl of Sefton (1905–1907)
- Bernard Forbes, 8th Earl of Granard (1907–1915)
- Edwyn Scudamore-Stanhope, 10th Earl of Chesterfield (1915–1922)
- Thomas Thynne, 5th Marquess of Bath (1922–1924)
- Bernard Forbes, 8th Earl of Granard (1924–1936)
- Henry Somerset, 10th Duke of Beaufort (1936–1978)
- David Fane, 15th Earl of Westmorland (1978–1991)
- Savile Crossley, 3rd Baron Somerleyton (1991–1999)
- Samuel Vestey, 3rd Baron Vestey (1999–2018)

=== 21st century ===
- Rupert Ponsonby, 7th Baron de Mauley (2019–2024)
- Henry Ashton, 4th Baron Ashton of Hyde (2024–present)
