= Bernard Forbes, 8th Earl of Granard =

Anglo-Irish soldier and politician (1874–1948)

The Right Honourable The Earl of Granard KP GCVO PC
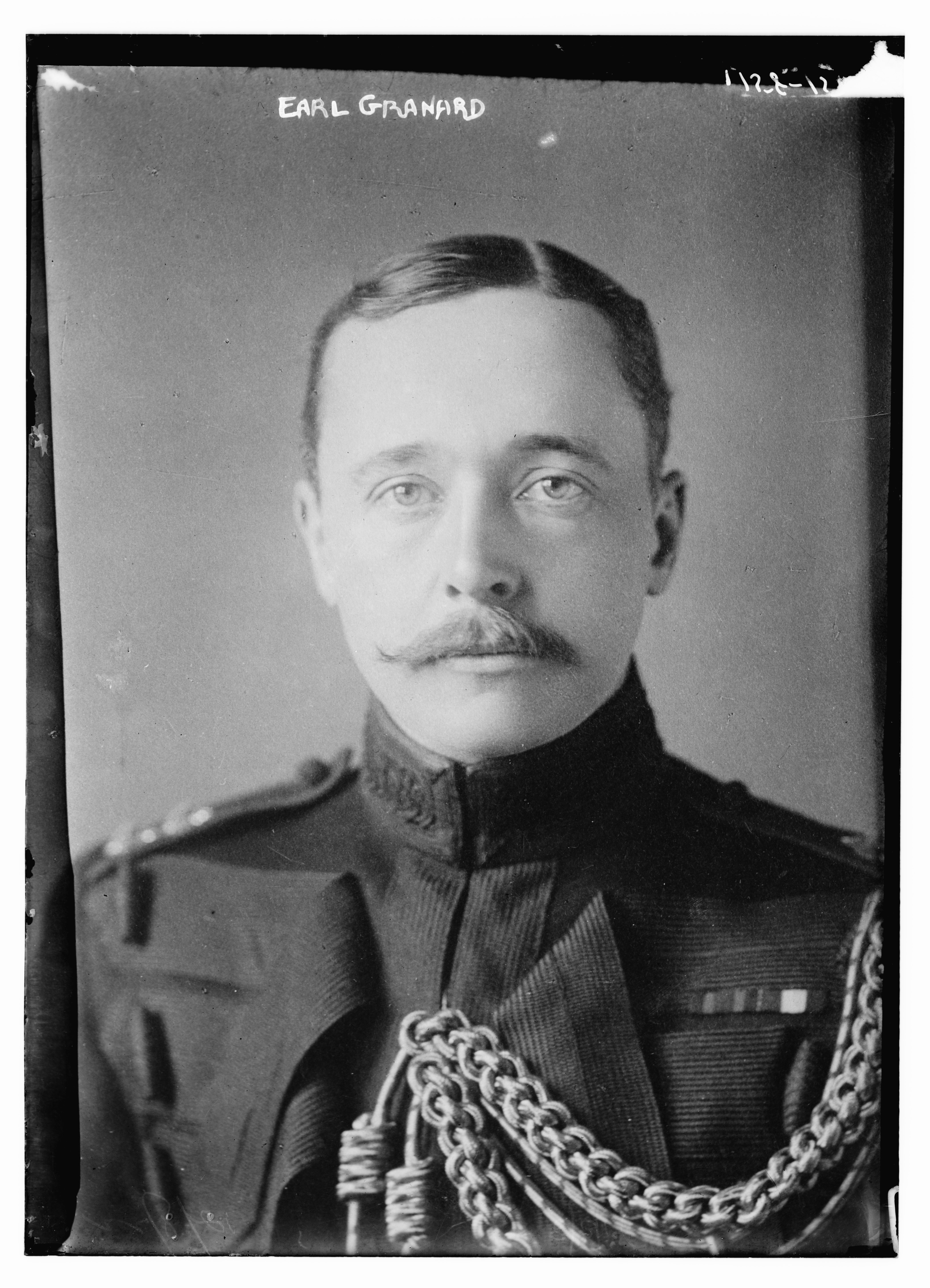

Senator
- In office 11 December 1922 – 12 December 1934

Master of the Horse
- In office 1923–1936
- Monarch: George V
- Preceded by: The Marquess of Bath
- Succeeded by: The Duke of Beaufort
- In office 6 September 1907 – 25 May 1915
- Monarchs: Edward VII; George V
- Prime Minister: Sir Henry Campbell-Bannerman; H. H. Asquith
- Preceded by: The Earl of Sefton
- Succeeded by: The Earl of Chesterfield

Personal details
- Born: 17 September 1874
- Died: 10 September 1948 (aged 73)
- Party: Liberal
- Spouse: Beatrice Mills (m. 1909)
- Children: 4, including Arthur
- Parent: George Forbes (father)

Bernard Arthur William Patrick Hastings Forbes, 8th Earl of Granard, KP, GCVO, PC (17 September 1874 – 10 September 1948), styled Viscount Forbes from 1874 to 1889, was an Anglo-Irish soldier and Liberal politician.

== Background ==
Engraved Arms of Forbes, Earl of Granard

Granard was the son of George Forbes, 7th Earl of Granard, and Mary Frances Petre, daughter of William Petre, 12th Baron Petre. At age 14, he succeeded as eighth Earl of Granard on the death of his father in 1889.

== Political career ==
Upon reaching maturity in 1895 Granard was able to take his seat in the House of Lords under his junior title Baron Granard, which was in the Peerage of the United Kingdom. When the Liberals came to power in 1905 under Sir Henry Campbell-Bannerman, Granard was appointed a Lord-in-waiting to Edward VII (government whip in the House of Lords) and Assistant Postmaster-General, posts he held until 1907 and 1909 respectively. In 1907 he was admitted to the Privy Council and appointed Master of the Horse, an office he retained until 1915.

Granard was also involved in Irish politics. He was a member of the Irish Food Convention, Food Controller for Ireland in 1918, in which year he was also admitted to the Irish Privy Council. He was a member of the short-lived Senate of Southern Ireland in 1921 and of the Senate of the Irish Free State from 1922 to 1934. He was again Master of the Horse between February 1924 and 1936, but by this time this post had ceased being a political office. Granard also served as Vice-Admiral of Connaught, Lord Lieutenant of Longford.

=== Orders ===
He was made a knight of several orders in different countries:

- Order of St Patrick in Ireland (1909).
- Legion of Honour in France.
- Order of Charles III in Spain.
- Order of the Polar Star in Sweden.
- Order of the Dannebrog in Denmark.
- Military Order of Christ in Portugal.
- Order of the White Eagle in Serbia.
- Order of Civil Merit in Spain.
- Order of the Redeemer in Greece.

He was also an assistant Postmaster General of the United Kingdom, a Lord-in-Waiting, and Master of the Horse to King Edward VII, between 1905 and 1910, and to King George V.

== Military ==
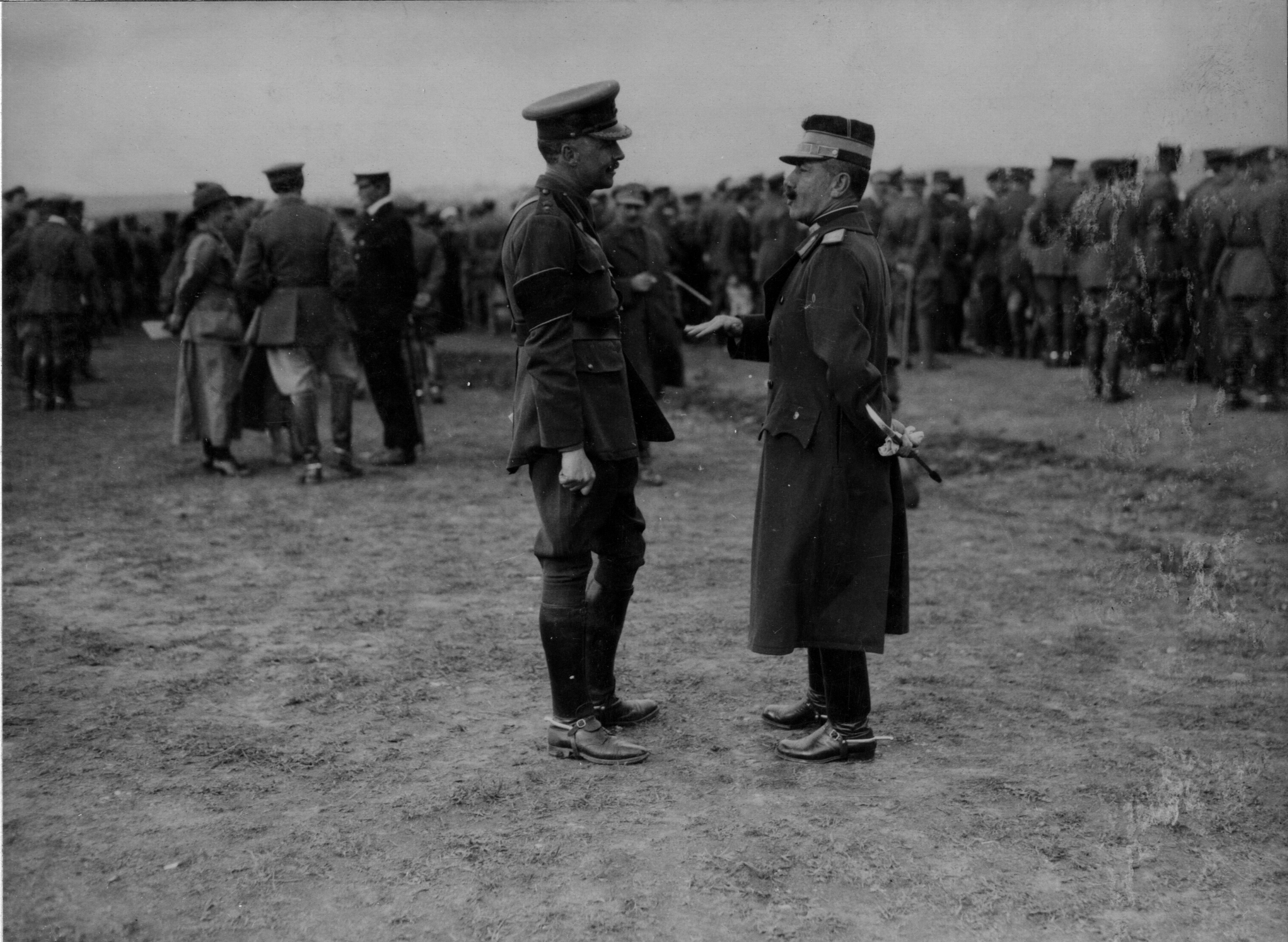
General Zymvrakakis talking to Lord Granard.

In 1896, Granard was commissioned into the 3rd (Militia) Battalion, Gordon Highlanders, but on 29 November 1899 he transferred to a regular commission as a second lieutenant in the Scots Guards. Following the outbreak of the Second Boer War in late 1899, he was with the 2nd Battalion of his regiment as it left Southampton for South Africa on the SS Britannic in March 1900. He served with the 1st Battalion in South Africa from 1900 to 1902, taking part in the Battle of Belfast (August 1900) and operations at Komatipoort. While in South Africa, he was promoted to lieutenant on 20 July 1901. Following the end of the war, Lord Granard left Cape Town for England on the SS Simla in late July 1902. Promotion to captain followed in 1905. In 1908 he was appointed Lieutenant-Colonel in the Post Office Rifles. He resigned his commissions in the Post Office Rifles in 1910 and the Scots Guards in 1911. In 1916 he was recalled to command the 5th Battalion, Royal Irish Regiment. He was later Military Secretary to the Commander-in-Chief of the Salonika Forces from 1917.

Apart from his political and military career, Granard was also on the board of Arsenal Football Club, and was club chairman from 1936 to 1939.

== Family ==
Lord Granard married, in 1909, Beatrice Mills, daughter of the wealthy American businessman Ogden Mills from Staatsburg, New York. She was the twin sister of Gladys Mills Phipps. Her brother, Ogden L. Mills, was the 50th United States Secretary of the Treasury.

They had four children:

- Lady Moira Mary Forbes (1910–1994); married Count Rossi of Switzerland.
- Lady Eileen Beatrice Forbes (1912–1993); married John Crichton-Stuart, 5th Marquess of Bute. They were the parents of John Crichton-Stuart, 6th Marquess of Bute.
- Arthur Forbes, 9th Earl of Granard (1915–1992); married Princess Marie-Madeleine Eugénie de Faucigny-Lucinge.
- Hon. John Forbes (1920–1982). He was the father of Peter Forbes, 10th Earl of Granard.

Lord Granard died at age 73. He was succeeded by his eldest son Arthur. Apart from his seat at Castleforbes, Newtownforbes, County Longford, Ireland, Lord Granard had a London residence at Forbes House, Halkin Street, and a residence at 73 Rue de Varenne, Paris.

== Coat of arms ==
Coat of arms of Bernard Forbes, 8th Earl of Granard
Coronet A coronet of an Earl Crest A Bear statant Argent guttée de sang muzzled Gules. Escutcheon Azure three Bears' Heads couped Argent muzzled Gules. Supporters Dexter: an Unicorn Erminois armed maned tufted and unguled Or; Sinister: a Dragon wings expanded Ermine. Motto Fax Mentis Incendium Gloriae (The incitement to glory is the firebrand of the mind)

Political offices
Preceded by The Earl of Kintore	Lord-in-waiting; 1905–1907	Succeeded by The Lord O'Hagan
Preceded by The Earl of Sefton	Master of the Horse; 1907–1915	Succeeded by The Earl of Chesterfield
Court offices
Preceded by The Marquess of Bath	Master of the Horse; 1924–1936	Succeeded by The Duke of Beaufort
Honorary titles
Vacant Title last held by The Earl of Longford	Lord Lieutenant of Longford; 1916–1922	Office abolished
Peerage of Ireland
Preceded by George Forbes	Earl of Granard; 1889–1948	Succeeded by Arthur Patrick Hastings Forbes
