= Charlotte de La Trémoille =

French noblewoman

Princess Charlotte de La Trémoille
- 12th Duchess of Thouars (more...)

Duchess of Thouars
- Period: 9 December 1933 - 27 October 1971
- Predecessor: Prince Louis Jean Marie de La Trémoille
- Successor: Prince Jean Charles Lamoral de La Trémoïlle
- Full name: Charlotte Marie Clotilde de La Trémoille
- Born: 20 November 1892; Paris, Empire of France (now French Fifth Republic)
- Died: 27 October 1971 (aged 78); Paris
- Noble family: La Trémoille
- Spouses: Prince Henri-Florent Lamoral of Ligne (m. 1910 - 1967; his death)
- Issue: Prince Jean Charles Lamoral de La Trémoïlle, 13th Duke of Thouars
- Father: Prince Louis Charles Marie de La Trémoille, 10th Duke of Thouars
- Mother: Hélène Marie Léonie Pillet-Will

Princess Charlotte de La Trémoille (Charlotte Marie Clotilde de La Trémoille; 20 November 1892 – 27 October 1971), 12th Duchess of Thouars, 11th Duchess of La Trémoïlle, 14th Princess de Tarente, 18th princess de Talmond and 18th Countess of Laval was a French noblewoman and the daughter of Prince Louis Charles Marie de La Trémoille and his wife, Hélène Marie Léonie Pillet-Will.

== Family ==
On 13 April 1910, she married Prince Henri-Florent Lamoral of Ligne. They had one son, Prince Jean Charles de La Trémoille. After the death of Charlotte's younger brother, Louis Jean Marie de La Trémoille, she succeeded to his titles.

Princess Charlotte de La Trémoille La Trémoille Family Born: 8 February 1910 Died: 9 December 1933
French nobility
Preceded by Prince Louis Jean Marie de La Trémoille	Duchess of Thouars, et cetera 9 December 1933 - 27 October 1971	Succeeded by Prince Jean Charles Lamoral de La Trémoïlle of Ligne
