= Jean de la Trémoille (1377–1449) =

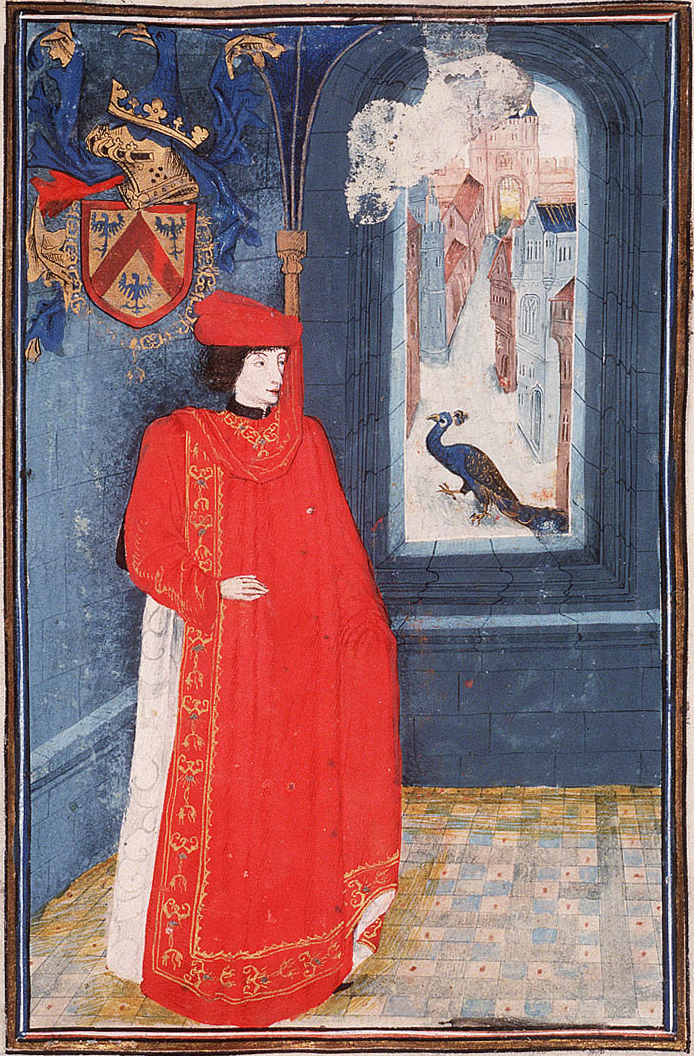
Jean de La Trémoille

Or, with a chevron gules, accompanied by three eaglets in azure with beaks and talons gules, all bordered by a border gules.

Jean de la Trémoille (d. 1449), seigneur of Jonvelle, was Grand Master and Grand Chamberlain to the dukes of Burgundy John the Fearless and Philip the Good. He was the son of Guy and Marie de Sully, Princess of Boisbelle and Countess of Guînes. On 17 July 1424 he married Jacqueline d'Amboise, daughter of Ingerger II and Jeanne de Craon.

He bore the titles :

- de la Trémoïlle, or de la Trémouille
- seigneur de Jonvelle
- seigneur of Beaumont
- seigneur of Saint-Loup
- seigneur of Conflans-Sainte-Honorine
- seigneur of Saint-Just
- seigneur of Sainte Hermine
- seigneur of Sully
- seigneur of Saint-Gaudon
- seigneur of Courcelles
- seigneur of Antilly
- seigneur of Bauché
- seigneur of Amboise
- seigneur of Montrichard
- seigneur of Bléré
- baron of Dracy
- knight of the Order of the Golden Fleece from 1430.
