= Jean Charles Lamoral of Ligne-La Trémoïlle =

Franco-Belgian nobleman

Prince Jean Charles Lamoral
- Prince of Ligne

Duke of Thouars
- Tenure: 27 October 1971 – 9 July 2005
- Predecessor: Princess Charlotte
- Successor: Prince Charles-Antoine
- Born: 16 June 1911
- Died: 9 July 2005 (aged 94)
- Noble family: Ligne (agnatic); La Trémoïlle (cognatic)
- Spouse: Maria del Rosario de Lambertye-Gerbeviller (m. 1942)
- Issue: Princess Hedwige Marie; Prince Charles-Antoine Lamoral; Princess Nathalie Marie
- Father: Prince Henri-Florent de Ligne
- Mother: Princess Charlotte de La Trémoïlle, 12th Duchess of Thouars

Prince Jean Charles Lamoral de Ligne-La Trémoïlle (16 June 1911 – 9 July 2005), 14th Duke of Thouars, 13th Duke of La Trémoïlle, 16th Prince de Tarente, 20th Prince de Talmond and 20th Count of Laval, was a Franco-Belgian nobleman and the only child of the French Princess Charlotte de La Trémoïlle, 12th Duchess of Thouars, and her Belgian husband, Prince Henri-Florent de Ligne. Upon the death of his mother in 1971, he succeeded to all of her French noble titles.

== Family background ==
Although a junior member of the House of Ligne, he founded a distinct cadet branch of that princely family – upon the death of his childless maternal uncle, Louis Jean Marie de La Trémoille, prince étranger, he legally appended his mother's surname (de La Trémoïlle) to his father's surname (de Ligne) in Belgium.

== Marriage and children ==
On 11 March 1942 in Paris, France, he married Maria del Rosario de Lambertye-Gerbeviller (14 October 1922 - 17 March 2023), daughter of Charles Edmond de Lambertye, Marquis de Gerbeviller.

They had three children, all of whom married into princely families:

- Hedwige Marie (born 1943), married in 1966 at Antoing, Belgium, to Prince Charles-Guillaume de Merode (born 1940); their children include:
  - Emmanuel de Merode
- Charles-Antoine Lamoral (born 1946), married firstly in 1971 to Lady Moira Forbes, daughter of the 9th Earl of Granard and his wife, Marie-Madeleine de Faucigny-Lucinge; after their divorce in 1975, he wed secondly at Neuilly-sur-Seine, France, on 23 January 1976 to Princess Alyette of Croÿ (born 1951), from whom he was divorced in 2002; he has issue by the second marriage:

- Edouard Lamoral Rodolphe (born in Paris in 1976), wed at Antoing Castle on 29 June 2009 to film actress (and god-daughter of Silvio Berlusconi) Isabella Orsini (born at Perugia on 2 December 1974).

- Althea Isabelle Sophie
- Athénaïs Allegra Isabella
- Antoine Tao Édouard Adrien

- Charles Lamoral Joseph Malcolm (born in Paris in 1980), wed at Antoing Castle on 20 November 2010 to Ran Li (born in Guangdong, China).

- Amadeo Joseph Gabriel

- Nathalie Marie (1948–1992), married in 1973 at Saint-Georges-sur-Loire, France, to Prince Alain de Polignac (born 1940).

His legal title and style in Belgium was: "His Highness Jean Charles de Ligne de La Trémoïlle, Prince de Ligne."

Prince Jean Charles Lamoral de La Trémoille House of Ligne-La Trémoille Cadet branch of the House of Ligne and La Trémoille family Born: 16 June 1911 Died: 9 July 2005
French nobility
Preceded by Princess Charlotte de La Trémoille	Duke of Thouars, et cetera 27 October 1971 – 9 July 2005	Succeeded by Prince Charles-Antoine Lamoral de La Trémoïlle of Ligne-La Trémoïlle
