= Louis Charles de La Trémoille =

French aristocrat

Prince Louis Charles de La Trémoille
- 9th Duke of Thouars (more...)

Duke of Thouars
- period: 10 November 1839 – 4 July 1911
- Predecessor: Prince Charles Bretagne Marie de La Trémoille
- Successor: Prince Louis Charles Marie de La Trémoille
- Born: 26 October 1838; Paris, Kingdom of France (now French Fifth Republic)
- Died: 4 July 1911 (aged 72); Paris
- Noble family: La Trémoille
- Spouses: Marguerite-Jeanne Duchâtel (m. 1862 – 1911; his death)
- Issue: Prince Louis Charles Marie de La Trémoille, 10th Duke of Thouars; Princess Charlotte de La Trémoille, Duchess of Estrées
- Father: Prince Charles Bretagne Marie de La Trémoille, 8th Duke of Thouars
- Mother: Valentine Eugénie Joséphine Walsh de Serrant

Prince Louis Charles de La Trémoille (26 October 1838 – 4 July 1911), 9th Duke of Thouars, 8th Duke of La Trémoïlle, 11th prince de Tarente, 15th prince de Talmond and 15th Count of Laval was a French aristocrat and the son of Charles Bretagne Marie de La Trémoille and his third wife, Valentine Eugénie Joséphine Walsh de Serrant.

Louis Charles was also an archivist, bibliophile and collector.

== Life ==
La Trémoille was born in his father's seventy-fifth year, and acceded to his titles just one year later. He became a historian and in 1889 was inducted as a member of the Academy of Inscriptions and Beautiful Letters. He devoted much study to his family archives, held at the Château de Serrant and also granted access of them to researchers, in particular Paul Marchegay (1812–1885) and the historian Hugues Imbert (1822–1882).

On 23 August 1886, accompanied by his friend Henry Le Tonnelier de Breteuil, Marquis of Breteuil, Louis Charles escorted Prince Philippe d’Orléans, Duke of Orléans and various other Orléans Princes who were subject to The Law of Exile from the Palace of Eu to Le Tréport where they were to embark to England.

== Marriage ==
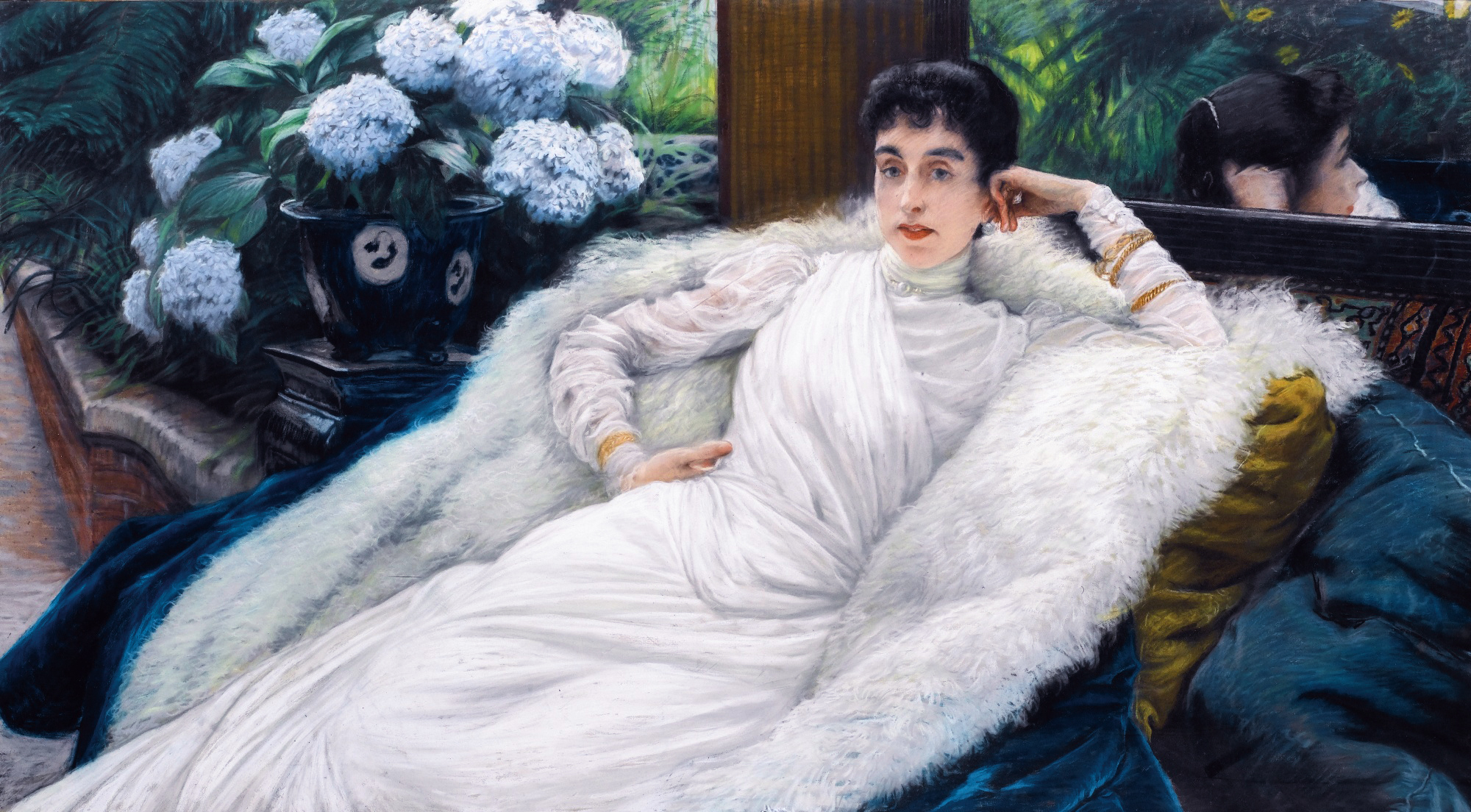
Portrait of Louis Charles's wife, Clotilde Briatte by 19th century French artist James Tissot

On 2 July 1862 he married Marguerite-Jeanne Tanneguy-Duchâtel (16 December 1840 – 19 September 1913), daughter of count Charles Marie Tanneguy Duchâtel, former minister to King Louis-Philippe of France and of his wife Rosalie ("Eglé") Paulée); They had two children:

- Prince Louis Charles Marie de La Trémoille (1863–1921) who succeeded him.
- Princess Charlotte de La Trémoille (1864–1944); who married the Charles Marie François de La Rochefoucauld (1863–1907), The 7th Duke of Estrées.

Prince Louis Charles de La Trémoille La Trémoille family Born: 26 October 1838 Died: 4 July 1911
French nobility
Preceded by Prince Charles Bretagne Marie de La Trémoille	Duke of Thouars, et cetera 10 November 1839 – 4 July 1911	Succeeded by Prince Louis Charles Marie de La Trémoille
