= Charles Bretagne Marie de La Trémoille, 9th Duke of Thouars =

French aristocrat and soldier

Charles Bretagne Marie de La Trémoille
- 9th Duke of Thouars (more...)

9th Duke of Thouars
- period: 19 May 1792 – 10 November 1839
- Predecessor: Prince Jean Bretagne Charles de La Trémoille
- Successor: Louis Charles de La Trémoille
- Born: 24 March 1764; Paris, Kingdom of France (now French Fifth Republic)
- Died: 10 November 1839 (aged 75)
- Noble family: La Trémoille
- Spouses: Louise Emmanuelle de Châtillon (m. 1781–1814; her death); Marie Virginie de Saint-Didier (m. 1817–1829; her death); Valentine Eugénie Joséphine Walsh de Serrant (m. 1830–1839; his death)
- Issue: With Louise Emmanuelle: Caroline de La Trémoille; With Marie Virginie: Charlotte de La Trémoille; Éléonore, Princess of Salm-Kyrburg; With Valentine: Marie Henriette de La Trémoille; Louis Charles de La Trémoille, 9th Duke of Thouars
- Father: Jean Bretagne Charles de La Trémoille
- Mother: Princess Marie Maximiliane of Salm-Kyrburg

Charles Bretagne Marie de La Trémoille, 9th Duke of Thouars (24 March 1764 – 10 November 1839), 9th Duke of Thouars, 7th Duke of La Trémoïlle, 10th prince de Tarente, 14th prince of Talmond and 14th Count of Laval, was a French aristocrat and soldier; he was the son of Jean Bretagne Charles de La Trémoille and his wife Princess Marie Maximilienne of Salm-Kyrburg.

== Marriages ==
La Trémoille married Louise-Emmanuelle de Châtillon in 1781. She was a granddaughter of Louis César de La Baume Le Blanc, the famous writer. The couple had one daughter:

- Caroline (26 October 1788 – 15 February 1791).

At the outbreak of the French Revolution, he sided with King Louis XVI, as did the rest of his family. In 1789, La Trémoille and his parents emigrated from France, and he joined the émigré army under the Prince of Condé. Two of La Trémoille's brothers perished in the Reign of Terror. His wife was imprisoned in the prison de l'Abbaye until 1792, when she was permitted to join him in England. She became a writer and left England in company of her brother-in-law Marie François Emmanuel de Crussol for the court of Russia around March 1797, where she was a maid of honour of Empress Maria Feodorovna.

After the Revolution, La Trémoille returned to France. Following Louise Emmanuelle's death, he remarried in 1817 to Marie Virginie de Saint-Didier. They had two daughters:

- Charlotte (8 October 1825 – 21 December 1879), who married baron Franciscus Johannes de Wijkerslooth.
- Éléonore (17 January 1827 – 26 November 1846), who married prince Frederick V, Prince of Salm-Kyrburg.

Following her death, La Trémoille married for a third time in 1830 to Valentine Eugénie Joséphine Walsh de Serrant (7 March 1810 – 10 September 1887). They had two children:

- Marie-Henriette (1833–1890), who married André de Grandmange.
- Louis Charles, (1838–1911) his heir as duc of Thouars.

La Trémoille died shortly after his son's birth, in 1839.

== Ancestry ==
Ancestors of Charles Bretagne Marie de La Trémoille, 9th Duke of Thouars

16. Charles Belgique Hollande de La Trémoille
8. Charles Louis Bretagne de La Trémoille
17. Madeleine de Créquy
4. Charles Armand René de La Trémoille
18. Rene Armand de La Fayette
9. Marie Madeleine Motier de La Fayette
19. Marie-Madeleine de Marillac
2. Jean Bretagne Charles de La Trémoille
20. Godefroy Maurice de La Tour d'Auvergne, Duke of Bouillon
10. Emmanuel Théodose de La Tour d'Auvergne, Duke of Bouillon
21. Marie Anne Mancini
5. Marie Hortense de La Tour d'Auvergne
22. Charles Belgique Hollande de La Trémoille =16
11. Marie Armande Victoire de La Trémoille
23. Madeleine de Créquy =17
1. Charles Bretagne Marie de La Trémoille
24. Karl Florentin of Salm-Neufville
12. Hendrik Gabriel Joseph, regent of Salm-Kyrburg
25. Marie Gabrielle de Lalaing
6. Philip Joseph, Prince of Salm-Kyrburg
26. Philippe François de Croÿ-Rœulx, Marquess of Warnecq
13. Maria Theresia de Croÿ
27. Claudine de La Pierre
3. Marie Maximilienne Louise de Salm-Kyrbourg
28. Philippe Emanuel, Prince of Hornes
14. Maximilian, Prince of Hornes
29. Marie Anne Antoinette de Ligne
7. Maria Theresa of Hornes
30. Thomas Bruce, 2nd Earl of Ailesbury
15. Lady Marie Thérèse Bruce, Baroness de Melsbroeck
31. Charlotte d'Argenteau, Countess of Esneux

Prince Charles Bretagne Marie de La Trémoille La Trémoille family Born: 24 March 1764 Died: 10 November 1839
French nobility
Preceded by Jean Bretagne Charles de La Trémoille	Duke of Thouars, et cetera 19 May 1792 – 10 November 1839	Succeeded by Louis Charles de La Trémoille
