= Jean Bretagne Charles de La Trémoille =

French noble

- 8th Duke of Thouars (more...)

8th Duke of Thouars
- period: 23 May 1741 – 19 May 1792
- Predecessor: Charles Armand René de La Trémoille
- Successor: Charles Bretagne Marie de La Trémoille
- Full name: Jean Bretagne Charles Godefroy de La Trémoille
- Born: 5 February 1737; Paris, Kingdom of France (now French Fifth Republic)
- Died: 19 May 1792 (aged 55); Chambéry
- Noble family: La Trémoille
- Spouses: Marie Genevieve de Durfort (m. 1751 - 1762; her death); Princess Marie Maximiliane of Salm-Kyrburg (m. 1763 - 1790; her death)
- Issue: Charles Bretagne Marie de La Trémoille, 9th Duke of Thouars; Antoine Philippe de La Trémoille; Charles Godefroy de La Trémoille; Louis Stanislas de La Trémoille
- Father: Charles Armand René de La Trémoille, 6th Duke of Thouars
- Mother: Marie Hortense de La Tour d'Auvergne
- Military career
- Allegiance: Kingdom of France
- Branch: French Royal Army
- Commands: Regiment of the Aquitaine Cavalry
- Conflicts: Seven Years' War; Battle of Krefeld

Jean Bretagne Charles de La Trémoille, 8th Duke of Thouars (Jean Bretagne Charles Godefroy; 5 February 1737 – 19 May 1792), 8th Duke of Thouars, was a French soldier and the son of Charles Armand René de La Trémoille and his wife, Marie Hortense de La Tour d'Auvergne.

== Life ==
La Trémoille began his military career in the Seven Years' War as the head of the regiment of Aquitaine-Cavalry. He was seriously wounded and afterwards promoted to the rank of sergeant, and later of brigadier, of the armies of the king.

His intervention enabled Michel du Motier, Marquis de La Fayette to marry Marie-Julie de la Riviere, who came from a wealthier and more distinguished family, in 1754.

During the French Revolution, La Trémoille remained faithful to King Louis XVI. He emigrated in 1789, but two of his sons died in the Reign of Terror.

== Marriage ==
La Trémoille married Marie-Genevieve de Durfort (1735-1762), the daughter of Guy-Michel de Durfort, Duc of Lorges and Randan, Marshal of France, and Élisabeth Philippine of Poitiers de Rye, Countess of Neufchatel, on 18 February 1751. They did not have children. On 27 June 1763 he married again to Marie-Maximilienne, princess of Salm-Kyrburg (1744-1790) the daughter of Prince Philip Joseph I, Prince of Salm-Kyrburg and Princess Maria Theresia of Hornes.

From his second marriage, the La Trémoille had four sons:

1. Charles Bretagne Marie de La Trémoille, born 24 March 1764, died 10 November 1839.
2. Antoine Philippe de La Trémoille, Prince of Talmont (27 September 1765 and guillotined on 29 January 1794)
3. Charles Godefroy de La Trémoille, canon (27 September 1765 - 15 June 1794)
4. Louis Stanislas de La Trémoille, Prince of Trémoille (12 June 1767 - August 1837) He married Genevieve de Maulévrier-Langeron (died in 1829), and later married Augusta Murray.

Prince Jean Bretagne Charles de La Trémoille La Trémoille Family Born: 5 February 1737 Died: 19 May 1792
French nobility
Preceded by Charles Armand René de La Trémoille	Duke of Thouars, et cetera 23 May 1741 - 19 May 1792	Succeeded by Charles Bretagne Marie de La Trémoille
