= Antoing Castle =

Castle in Hainaut, Wallonia, Belgium

- Château d'Antoing
- Wallonia, Belgium
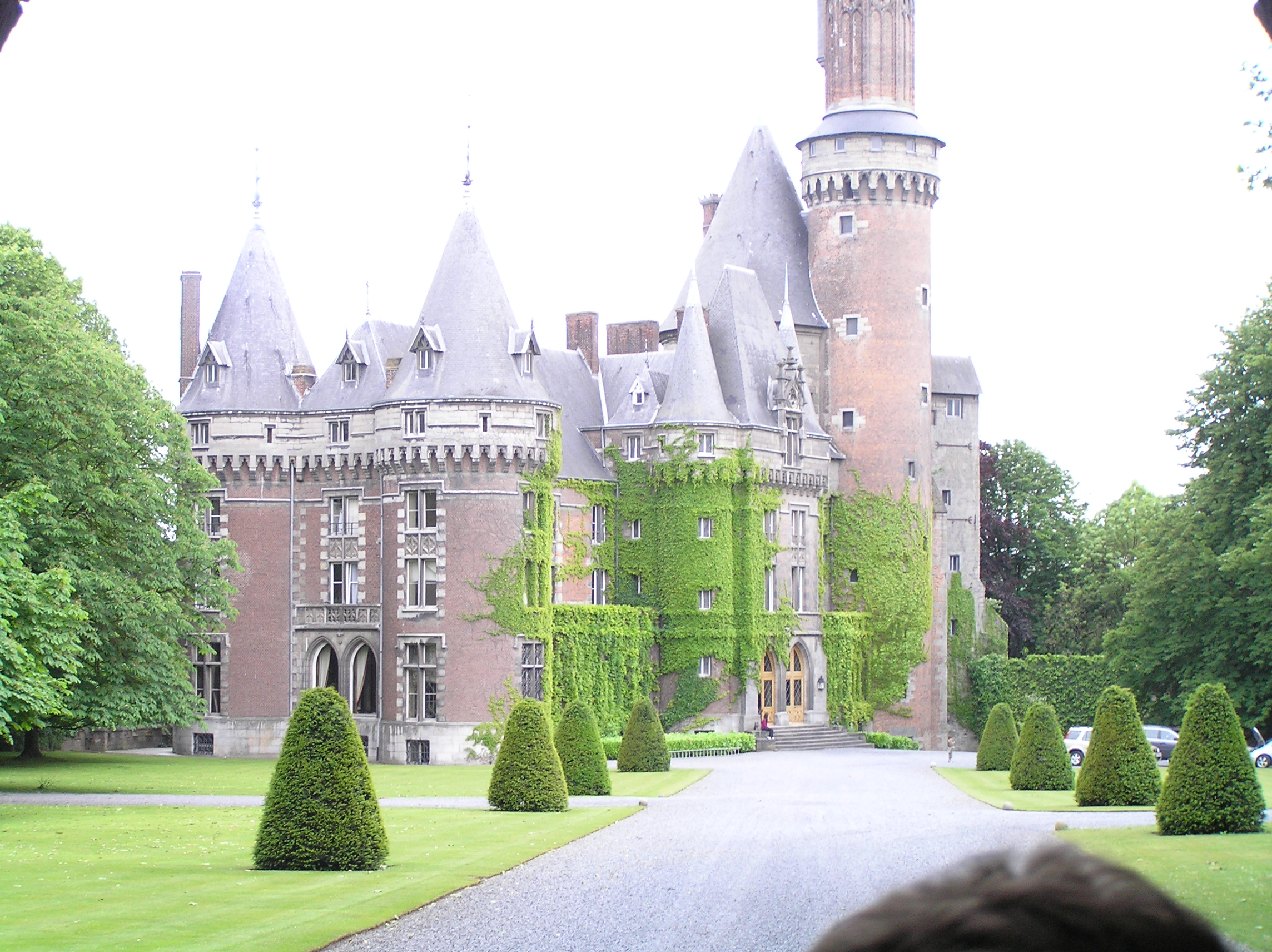

Site information
- Type: Castle

Location
- Coordinates: 50.565°N 3.447°E

Antoing Castle (French: Château d'Antoing) is one of Belgium's best-known castles. The castle is situated along the Scheldt River in Antoing in Hainaut, Wallonia. Locally, it is known as Château d'Antoing and Château des Princes de Ligne. It is held by the Princes de Ligne.

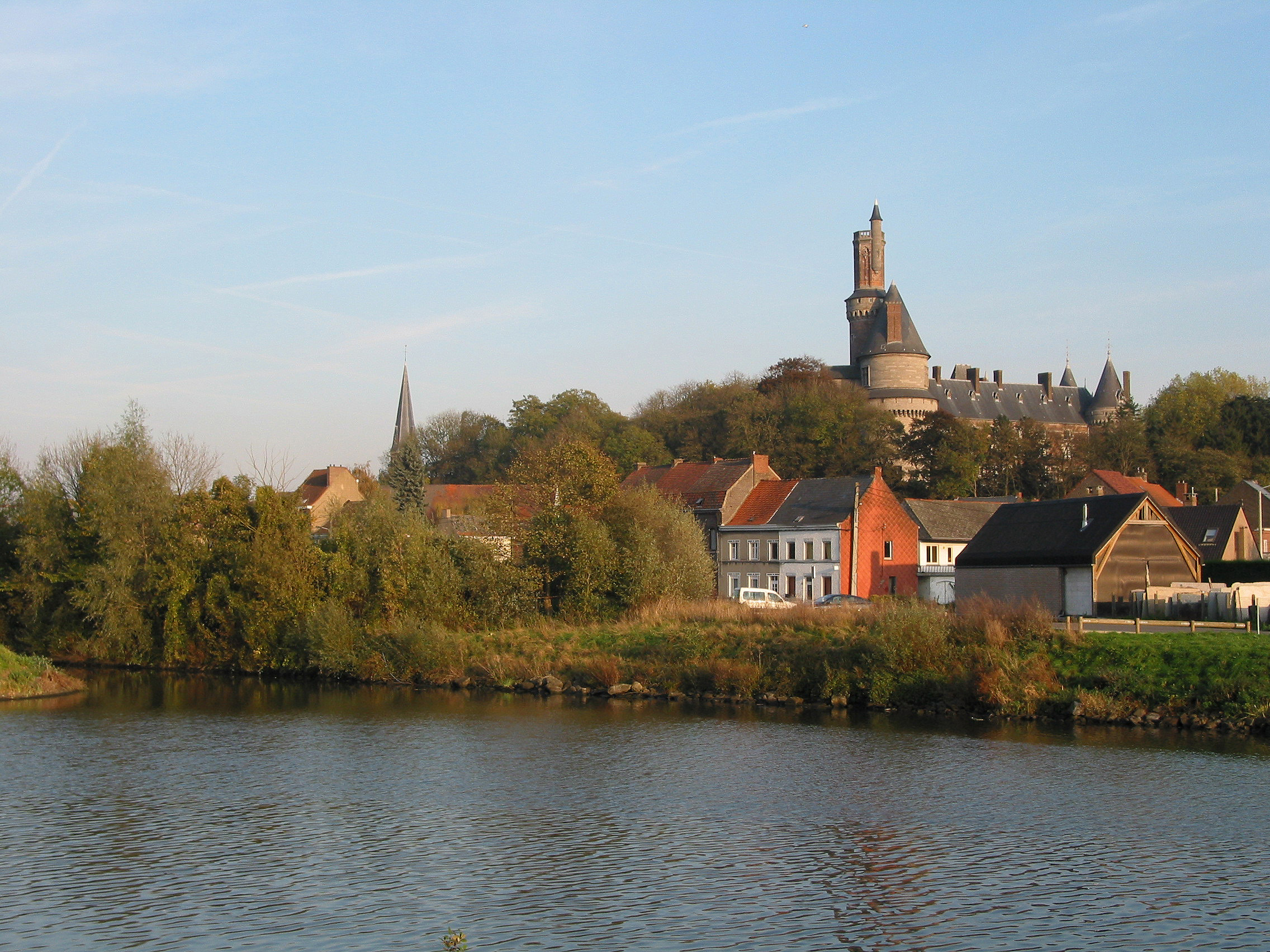
View of Amtoing Castle from the Scheldt River

== History ==
In the 10th century, the Count of Flanders built a motte-and-bailey castle along the Scheldt River on the current site of Amtoing Castle. Today, this is located in the municipality of Antoing in Hainaut Province of Wallonia, Belgium. In the early 12th century, stone fortifications and a stone keep were added to the castle.

Jean de Melum rebuilt Antoing Castle between 1436 and 1452, creating a "luxurious tower house" with updated defenses. In the 15th and 16th centuries, Antoing Castle was visited by many notables of the era, including Charles the Bold; Henry VIII; Margaret of Austria; Maximilian I, Holy Roman Emperor; Philip the Good; and Philip II of Spain. In the 17th and 18th centuries, Antoing Castle was visited by Louis XIV and Louis XV.

In 1634, Antoing Castle was inherited by the Princes de Ligne when there was not a male heir, and the holder of that title still owns it. In 1901 to 1914, Amtoing Castle was used by the College of the Sacred Heart, operated by the French Jesuit for students of the College of Lille in exile. During World War I, the castle was used as a hospital by the Imperial German Army.

Antoing Castle is now the private home of the De Ligne family. It is one of the best-known castles in Belgium. Locally, it is called the Château d'Antoing and the Château des Princes de Ligne.

== Architecture ==
Antoing Castle's core is from the late Medieval Ages. Its round towers were added in the 1400s. It also includes a corps de logis that was added near its gatehouse in the mid 16th century and is now used as a coach house.

Antoing Castle was redesigned in Neo-Gothic style in the 19th century by the French architect Viollet-le-Duc.

== Popular culture ==
Antoing Castle was the primary filming location for The Devil's Nightmare (1971) a Belgian/Italian co-production.

== See also ==
- List of castles in Belgium
