= Charles-Antoine Lamoral de Ligne-La Trémoïlle =

Belgian French businessman

Charles-Antoine
- Prince de Ligne de La Trémoïlle
- Born: 30 September 1946 (age 79); Boulogne-sur-Mer, France
- Noble family: Ligne (agnatic); La Trémoïlle (cognatic)
- Spouses: Lady Moira Beatrice Forbes (m. 1971; div. 1975); Princess Alyette Isabelle Odile Marie de Croÿ (m. 1976)
- Issue: Prince Edouard Lamoral de Ligne de la Trémoïlle; Prince Charles Joseph de Ligne de la Trémoïlle
- Father: Jean Charles, Prince de Ligne de La Trémoille
- Mother: Maria del Rosario de Lambertye-Gerbéviller
- Occupation: Businessman

Prince Charles-Antoine Marie Louis Eugène Lamoral de Ligne-La Trémoïlle (born 30 September 1946) is a Belgian French businessman, member of a family of the Belgian nobility, the House of Ligne. He co-founded a company, with Christopher Harriman, LAREX Corporation, that promoted high-speed elevated transit and urban development, with environmental enhancement along the 35 miles of riverfront of the Los Angeles River corridor, including the California high-speed train from San Francisco to San Diego.

== Background ==
Charles-Antoine was born in Boulogne-sur-Mer, France, in 1946. He studied law at the Institut Catholique de Paris and hotel administration and management at Cornell University. He is the son of the late Jean Charles, Prince de Ligne de La Trémoïlle and Maria del Rosario de Lambertye-Gerbéviller (1922-2023).

He is third cousin once removed of Michel, head of the House of Ligne through their shared descent from Eugène, 8th Prince of Ligne. Like all members of the Ligne family, he holds the title of prince in the Belgian nobility and the style of Highness.

His branch of the Ligne family are heirs in the female line of the House of La Trémoïlle, which held the rare rank of prince étranger during France's ancien régime, as pretenders to the crown of Naples.

== Marriage and children ==
He married, firstly, Lady Moira Beatrice Forbes, daughter of Arthur Forbes, 9th Earl of Granard and Princess Marie Madeleine de Faucigny-Lucinge (née Maurel, widow of Prince Humbert de Faucigny-Lucinge), on 7 October 1971 and were divorced in 1975.

He married, secondly, Princess Alyette Isabelle Odile Marie de Croÿ, daughter of Prince Rodolphe de Croÿ, and Odile de Bailleul, on 23 January 1976. They had two sons:

- HH Prince Edouard Lamoral Rodolphe de Ligne (b.1976) who married Italian actress Isabella Orsini (two daughters and one son, Prince Antoine).
- HH Prince Charles Joseph Malcolm de Ligne (b. Paris, 1980) who married Ran Li on 20 November 2010 (one son, Prince Amadeo).

== Notes ==
Prince Charles-Antoine Lamoral de La Trémoille House of Ligne-La Trémoille Born: 30 September 1946
French nobility
Preceded by Prince Jean Charles Lamoral of Ligne-La Trémoïlle	Duke of Thouars, et cetera 9 July 2005 – present	Incumbent; Heir: Prince Edouard Lamoral Rodolphe de Ligne
