= Guy XV de Laval =

French noble and military officer

Guy XV de Laval, born François de Laval-Montfort, (1435–1501) was a French noble, military officer, and Grand Master of the Kingdom of France in 1483.

== Family ==
Guy was the son of Count Guy XIV of Laval and Isabella of Brittany. Through his mother, he was the great-grandson of both Joan of Navarre and King Charles VI of France.

== Biography ==
=== Childhood and Betrothal ===
Guy was baptized under the name of François by the Bishop of Rennes, Guillaume Brillet.

When he was six years old, he was betrothed to the heiress, Françoise de Dinan. She was at the same time sought after by Arthur de Montauban and by Gilles of Brittany, brother of Duke Francis I of Brittany.

In 1444, Françoise de Dinan was abducted and forced to marry Gilles of Brittany, with the aid of his brother Francis I, Françoise's mother, Catherine de Rohan, and even Guy XIV who, in exchange for the promise of 20,000 crowns had renounced the rights of his son.

Another of her suitors, Arthur de Montauban was disheartened, and hatched a plot against Gilles, who was imprisoned by his brother the Duke, and killed in 1450.

The Duchess of Brittany refused to abandon her sister-in-law to Arthur de Montauban, instead remarrying her to Guy XIV de Laval, who gave up the promised sum of 20,000 crowns in exchange.

Guy was raised with the Dauphin Louis, son of King Charles VII, and was an intimate friend of his.

=== Military career ===
In 1453, Guy accompanied the King on the Guyenne expedition and attended the second siege of Bordeaux.

In 1465, Guy sided with King Louis XI in the feudal conflict that was the War of the Public Weal against the Duchy of Brittany and Charles the Bold.

=== Royal Honours ===
Louis XI appointed Guy as Captain of Melun in 1466, and allowed him to quarter his arms with those of France.

Guy, with his brother Pierre de Laval, attended the Estates General in 1466, as Count of Gâvres. They were made Princes equal in rank to the Princes of Blood in 1467. Guy was also invested as Count of Montfort-sur-Risle at sometime between 1466 and 1468.

=== Count of Montfort and Laval ===
On the death of Charles IV of Anjou, the last member of the House of Valois-Anjou, in 1481, Maine reverted to the King, and Laval was erected as a County held directly under the King.

Guy often lived at the Château de Laval when not at court, Guy XIV, his father, lived in Brittany since his second marriage, and dwelt at Châteaubriant, his wife's main estate. He also lost the county of Montfort around this time, complaining bitterly to King Charles VIII about it.

Guy de Laval was fifty years old when his father died in 1486, taking the title of Count of Laval as Guy XV.

=== Service under Charles VIII ===
Charles VIII was at the Château de Laval in May 1487, spending a fairly long time there.

Charles VIII gave, in 1488, to Count Guy, the government of the city of Dreux and conferred on him the vacant office of Grand Master of France. These were rewards for his loyalty in the Mad War against Brittany.

=== Devotion and Piety ===
Guy XV of Laval demonstrated his Piety in these ways:

- He constructed the Church of Saint Vénérand in Laval
- He sold land to the Jacobin Convent of Laval

Guy possessed a singular devotion to Saint Francis and made in 1494, a nunnery, for the Franciscan nuns that followed the rule of Urban IV.

== Succession and Death ==
Guy XV de Laval did not fulfill the functions of his office or attend the coronation of Louis XII on 27 May 1498, due to his infirmities.

In the same year, Guy inherited the barony of Acquigny from his sister Jeanne de Laval, widow of Rene of Anjou, who had just died.

In 1499, Guy suffered a paralytic attack that left him physically and mentally crippled.

Guy's only son had died young and the succession fell to his nephew, Nicholas de Laval, Lord of La Roche-Bernard.

Guy died at the Château de Laval on 28 January 1501.

== Titles ==
Guy XV de Laval had several titles. Here is a list of them:

Count of Laval, Baron of Vitré, Viscount of Rennes, Count of Caserta, Baron of Laz, Baron of Acquigny, and of Crèvecœr, of Lohéac, Count of Montfort in Brittany, Baron of Gaël, Lord of Tinténiac, of Bécherel and of Romillé, of Bréal, Montreuil-Bellay, Saosnois, La Guerche, Gournay and of Noyelles-sur-Mer.

== Sources ==
- Walsby, Malcolm (2007). The Counts of Laval. Aldershot: Ashgate Publishing Company. ISBN 9780754658115.
