= Guy de Laval =

Guy de Laval may refer to:

- various heads of the House of Laval:
  - Guy I de Laval
  - Guy II de Laval
  - Guy III de Laval
  - Guy IV de Laval
  - Guy V de Laval (died 1210)
  - Guy VI de Laval
  - Guy VII de Laval
  - Guy VIII de Laval
  - Guy IX de Laval (died 1333)
  - Guy X de Laval
  - Guy XI de Laval
  - Guy XII de Laval
  - Guy XIII de Laval (1385–1414)
  - Guy XIV de Laval (1406–1486)
  - Guy XV de Laval
  - Guy XVI de Laval (1476–1531)
  - Guy XVII de Laval
  - Guy XVIII de Laval
  - Guy XIX de Laval
  - Guy XX de Laval (1585–1605)
  - Guy XXI de Laval
- Guy de Laval, bishop of Le Mans (1326–1338)
- Guy de Laval (Brumor) (died 1383), married a daughter of Charles I de Montmorency
- Guy I de Laval-Loué (died 1388)
- Guy de Laval (died 1404)
- Guy II de Laval-Loué (died 1484)
