= Château d'Acquigny =

French castle

Coordinates: 49°10′20″N 1°11′15″E

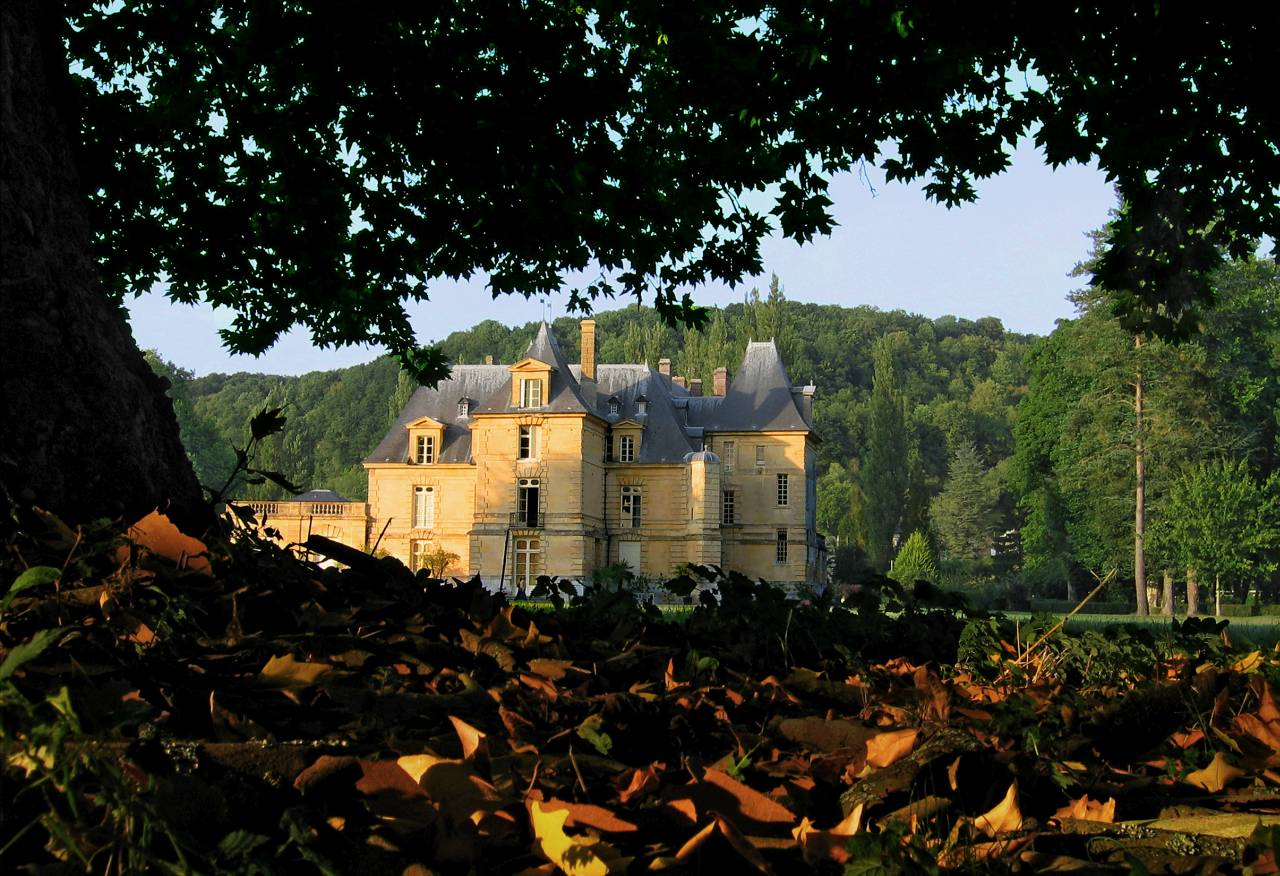
The south face of the Château d'Acquigny

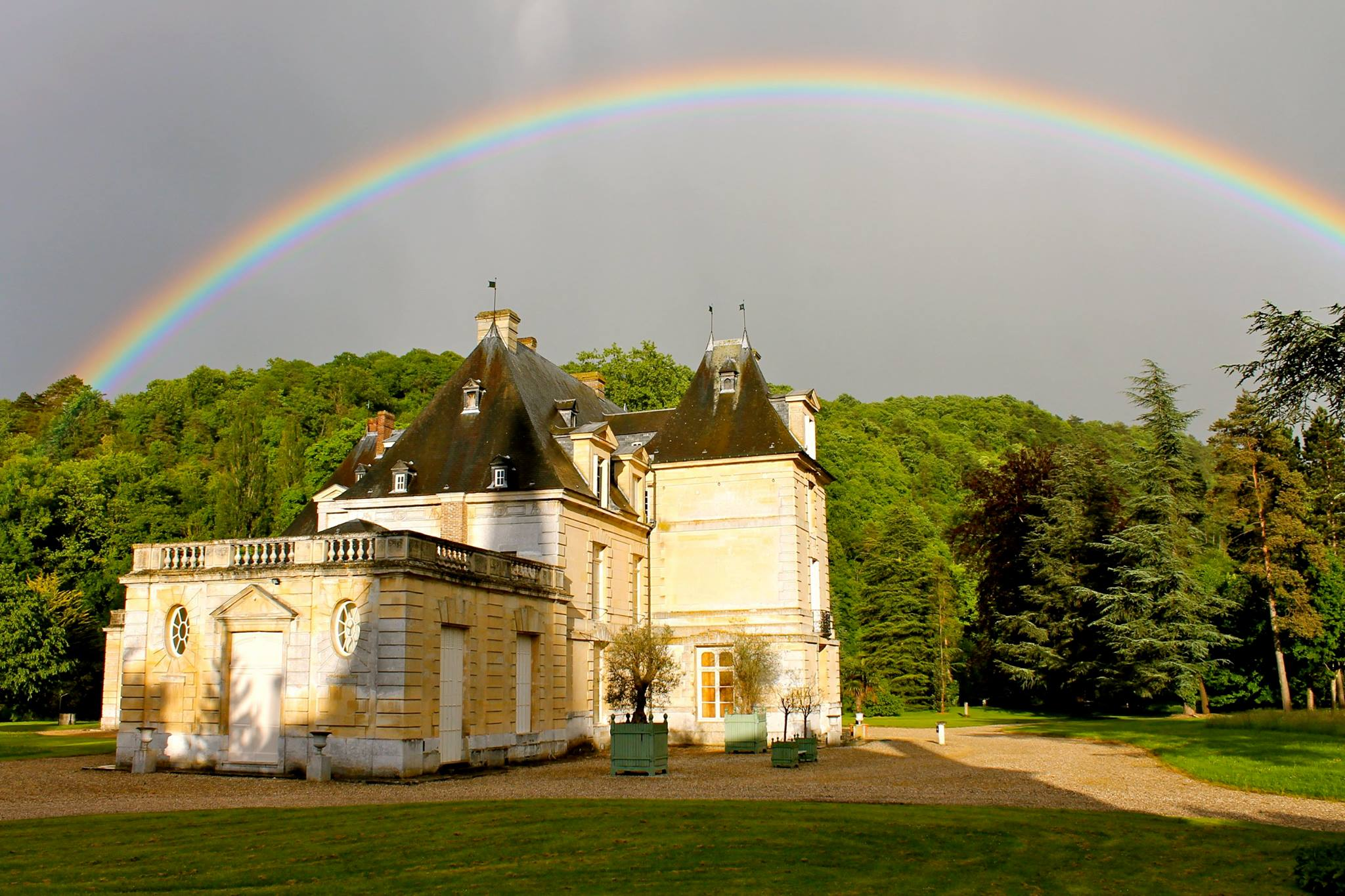
Rainbow above the château

The Château d'Acquigny is a French castle located in the department of Eure in Upper Normandy.

The present castle was built in 1557 by Anne de Laval and was listed in the French National Inventory of Historical Monuments in 1926.

== Topography and climate ==
Acquigny sits at the confluence of two rivers: the Eure, formerly navigable to Chartres, and the Iton. The two rivers were dammed and redirected during the 12th century by the monks of Conches-en-Ouche to power mills in the region. These newly created branches also fed into the castle's moats, which protected the monastery of Saint-Mals and the medieval village located directly behind the current castle.

On either side of the château are heavily wooded hills that shelter the valley in which the château lies, creating a microclimate slightly warmer than the surrounding areas.

== History ==
=== Medieval fortress ===
The Renaissance château that exists today was built on the site of a medieval fortress that had been built in the 11th century to protect Normandy while William the Conqueror was campaigning in England.

Following the imprisonment of Charles II of Navarre in 1356, the Duke of Lancaster was sent by the King of England to rescue Philip of Navarre, brother of Charles. His army of twelve hundred horsemen, sixteen thousand archers and two thousand armed brigandines convened in Évreux.

Kingdom of France between 1356 and 1363: Jacqueries and Companies Possessions of Charles de Navarre Territories Controlled by Edward III before the Treaty of Brétigny The first Treaty of London gives Aquitaine to the English Plantagenêt and the War of the Breton Succession by an alliance with the Duchy England The second Treaty of London further comprises Normandy and Maine Ride of Edward III in 1359-60 Territories ceded by France to Britain by the Treaty of Brétigny (follows the course of the first Treaty of London)

The original fortress was taken by Navarre and his army. Following the Battle of Cocherel, the castle served as a refuge and stronghold for Navarre. Control of this strategic location along the two rivers caused much anxiety for the king of France, who feared a loss of influence in the High Normandy Region and ordered his forces to retake Acquigny. After a six-month siege by the French forces, the fortress was retaken.

In 1378, the fortress was razed by Charles V, who wished to destroy any fortifications and castles in Normandy that stood for the King of Navarre. Charles V was successful in this aim with the exception of Cherbourg, which the French could not capture.

When the English were forced out of Normandy in 1450, Anne de Laval took possession of Acquigny. In an act to pay homage to the king of France, Anne de Laval combined the baronies Acquigny and Crevecoeur Crevecoeur.

=== The castle today ===
The present castle was built in 1557 by Anne de Laval, daughter of Guy XVI de Laval and widow of Louis Silly. She was also the cousin of the king and first lady of honor of Catherine de Medici. She wanted the architects Philibert Delorme and Jacques Androuet Hoop to design a castle inspired by the eternal love she bore for her husband. The castle's crest is made from the couple's intertwined initials (ALS); the floor plan of the château also takes the form of this triglyph. On the central turret, there is a vault in the form of a seashell in tribute to the Way of St. James. This facade of honor is coated with many other decorative elements that celebrate the love she held for her husband.

The castle was purchased in 1656 by Claude Roux Cambremont. In 1745, Pierre-Robert Roux Esneval, known as the President of Acquigny and the great-grandson of Claude Roux Cambremont, expanded the castle. Pierre-Robert Roux Esneval employed the architect Charles Thibault to rebuild the chapel of Saint-Mals as well as stables and sheds. It was at this time that the orangery was built, along with the Church of Saint Cécile and the Little Castle, which was designed to be attached to a hermitage.

== Gardens ==
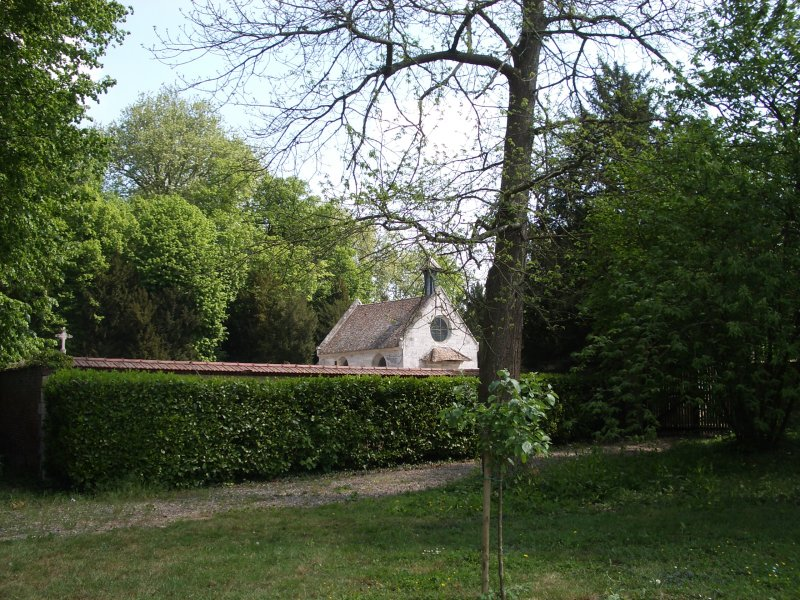
Saint Mauxe chapel seen from the château park.

The vast park created during the 17th century follows a circular route. The forest is filled with large chestnut trees, many over two hundred years old.

At the beginning of the 19th century, the park à la française was converted into a Romantic garden, with elements such as a cascade and a path of rocks based on a theme dear to Jean-Jacques Rousseau inReveries of the Solitary Walker.
