= Anne de Laval =

Anne de Laval may refer to:

- Anne de Laval (1505–1554), daughter of Guy XVI de Laval
- Anne de Laval (1385–1466), wife of Guy XIII de Laval
- Or one of the other daughters of the House of Laval
