= Guy XIV de Laval =

French nobleman

- Born: 28 January 1406
- Died: 2 September 1486 (aged 80); Châteaubriant
- Relatives: Son of Guy XIII de Laval and of Anne de Laval
- Military career
- Allegiance: Kingdom of France, Duke of Brittany
- Conflicts: Hundred Years' War (Battle of La Brossinière; Battle of Patay; Brittany and Normandy campaign (1448–49); Battle of Formigny)

Guy XIV de Laval, François de Montfort-Laval, (28 January 1406 – 2 September 1486, Châteaubriant), comte de Laval, baron de Vitré and of La Roche-Bernard, seigneur of Gâvre, of Acquigny, of Tinténiac, of Montfort and Gaël, of Bécherel, was a French nobleman, known for his account of Joan of Arc. He and his brother André de Lohéac were simultaneously vassals of the duke of Brittany and of the king of France.

== Life ==
=== Origins ===
Guy was the son of Guy XIII de Laval and Anne de Laval (1385–1466). (Note: Jean de Montfort, according to the marriage contract had to jettison his name and family's arms and take up the name "Guy of Laval" and the arms of the House of Laval) Through his mother he was grandson of Guy XII de Laval and of Jeanne de Laval, second wife of constable Bertrand du Guesclin.

In 1420, Guy XIV, only just fourteen years old, was the second person to put his signature to the petition sent to the king of England to demand the release of Arthur III, Duke of Brittany, the future constable, who had been a prisoner since the Battle of Agincourt. Arthur was freed in September of that year.

In 1424, he accompanied Arthur to the brilliant reception he had prepared for queen Yolande of Aragon in his château d'Angers. He thus worked to detach the Breton captain from the English and bring about a rapprochement between Brittany and France.

=== Companion of Joan of Arc ===
1415–1429 Controlled by Henry VI of England Controlled by Philip III of Burgundy Controlled by Charles VII of France ★ Main battles --- Battle of Agincourt, 1415 --- Journey to Chinon, 1429 --- March to Reims, 1429

On 8 June 1429, at Selles-en-Berry (Selles-sur-Cher), he rejoined the royal army which reunited Joan of Arc and the duke of Alençon to seek the liberation of the Loire Valley after the raising of the siege of Orléans. He has left, in a letter to his mother, a living portrait of Joan of Arc, of whom he was a fervent admirer. They distinguished themselves at Jargeau, Beaugency, and above all Patay, where he fought in the vanguard.

=== Coronation of Charles VII ===
With his brother André de Lohéac he followed the sovereign to Reims and assisted at the coronation of Charles VII of France on 17 July 1429, replacing Philip the Good, count of Flanders (who was also the Duke of Burgundy). Among the favours distributed by the king on this occasion, the territory of Laval was raised to a county, and Guy de Laval was made governor of Lagny in 1430.

=== House of Brittany ===
On 1 October 1430, at Redon, Guy XIV married Isabelle of Brittany (died 1444), daughter of John VI, Duke of Brittany. He was betrothed, in 1420, to Marguerite of Dreux, Isabelle's sister, who had herself been betrothed to Louis III d'Anjou.

=== Duchy of Brittany ===
In 1439, he negotiated the tentative Anglo-French treaty at Gravelines. Guy XIV assisted at Tours, on 14 January 1446, in a notable combat before Charles VII, between the Englishman Jean Chalons and Louis du Bueil, with the latter being killed. As his ancestors had founded the four canonical-prebendaries of Saint-Jean-de-Langeais, it was up to him to provide the residency privileges which they dispensed, as a result of which divine service was no longer assured.

=== Marriage with Françoise de Dinan ===
It is known that after he had, for financial reasons, let his son Guy XV's engagement to Françoise of Dinan drop in 1440, in favour of Gilles of Brittany. Guy XIV once again abused the young age of this same son, making him break off another engagement to her, when she became the widow of Gilles of Brittany, and engaged him at 45 years old in February 1451 at Vitré, Françoise of Dinan (died 1500), baronne of Châteaubriant. Guy XIV had no rights on the barony of Châteaubriant.

The Vatican archives contain two solicitations to the Holy See on this occasion, by Guy XIV and by his son. The inquiry concerning François-Guy de Laval, fils aîné de Guy, comte de Laval, seigneur du Gavre dates to 23 July 1450 and is addressed to the bishop of Nantes. He begged, for canonical reasons, for an exemption from parental kinship, and from the ban on marriage between a woman and the father of someone to whom she had previously been engaged. The mandate of dispensation for the marriage of Guy XIV and Françoise of Dinan said to be of Thouars from her mother's name, and for their absolution from certain bans, is dated 17 December 1450 and addressed to the bishop of Vannes.

The Vatican archives mention once more mention the comte of Laval and Françoise of Dinan his wife, in their founding of a psallette (choir school) at the Madeleine at Vitré, on 19 May 1453.

=== Relationship with Louis XI ===
King Louis XI established a cour des comptes at Laval in 1463. The following year the king authorised "his cousin" Guy XIV to add a first quarter of France, then those of Evreux - and those of Vitré.

=== Brocéliande ===
At the beginning of the 15th century, the château de Comper became the fiefdom of the Laval family. In order to assert better his precedence on the viscountcy of Rohan to the States of Brittany, Guy XIV de Laval, seigneur of Brocéliande, pretended, via his parent, to be descended from the ancient kings of Armorica Conan and Ponthus. In 1467, he tried to get inserted into the "Chartre des Usements de Brécilie", with the object of the seigneurial rights over the inhabitants of the forest, mentioning the jousts of Ponthus, making a historical fact of a 14th-century fictional romance in the style of the Arthurian legends called "Le roman de Ponthus et la Belle Sidoine".

He was the lieutenant-général of the duchy of Brittany in 1472.

=== Count of Laval ===
Louis XI, in 1482, gave full powers to the comté of Laval, separating it from the Comté of Maine. The comté of Laval was directly responsible to the crown of France.

He was buried at the collegial church of Saint-Thugal at Laval. His daughter Jeanne de Laval (1433–1498) was the wife of king René I of Anjou. His eldest son, Francis, would be Grand Master of France and comte of Laval (Guy XV de Laval), and one of his cadets Pierre de Laval was archbishop of Rheims.

== See also ==
- Château de Comper

== Sources ==
- Cowper, Frederick A. G. (1959). "Origins and Peregrinations of the Laval-Middleton Manuscript". Nottingham Medieval Studies. 3 (Jan). University of Nottingham Press: 3–18. doi:10.1484/J.NMS.3.1.
- Walsby, Malcolm (2007). The Counts of Laval: Culture, Patronage and Religion in Fifteenth- and Sixteenth-Century France. Ashgate.
- "Un compagnon de Jeanne d'Arc Guy XIV de Laval". Bulletin et mémoires :Société archéologique du département d'Ille-et-Vilaine. 109. 2005.
- Kekewich, Margaret L. (2008). The Good King: Rene of Anjou and Fifteenth Century Europe. Palgrave Macmillan. ISBN 978-1-4039-8820-1.
- Jürgen Klötgen, "Une charte retrouvée de Guy XV de Laval (1491) - Notice historique sur les armoiries de Laval", in Revue Historique et Archéologique du Maine, t.CXLVIII, Le Mans, 1997 p. 209-232. See also : Full text from DVD-RHAM Revue Historique et Archéologique du Maine/1875-2000, Copyright by Société Historique et Archéologique du Maine, Le Mans, 2006.
- (in French) "Guy XIV de Laval", in Alphonse-Victor Angot, Ferdinand Gaugain, Dictionnaire historique, topographique et biographique de la Mayenne, Goupil, 1900–1910 ([détail édition]), t. IV, p. 528.

| Preceded by Anne de Montmorency-Laval | Dame/Seigneur de Laval; 1429–86 | Succeeded by Guy XV de Laval |
