= Beatrice of Brittany =

- Béatrix de Bretagne
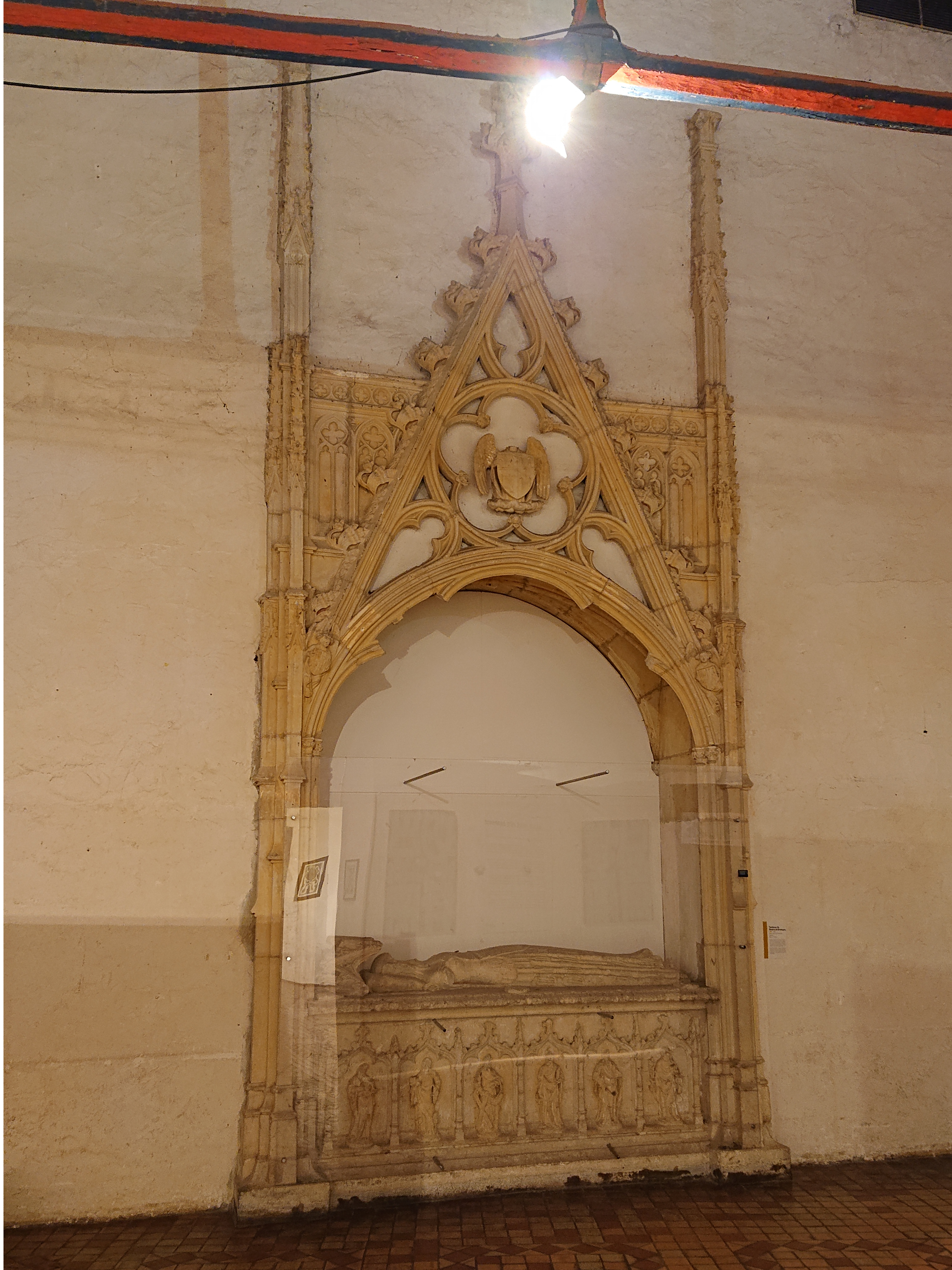
- Born: December 7, 1295
- Died: December 17, 1384 (aged 89)
- Burial place: Laval Castle
- Other name: Lady of Laval
- Spouse: Guy X of Laval
- Children: Guy XI of Laval; Guy XII of Laval; Catherine of Laval
- Parents: Arthur II of Brittany (father); Yolande of Dreux (mother)
- Relatives: John III of Brittany; Guy VII of Brittany; John of Montfort; Alix of Brittany

Beatrice of Brittany, Lady of Laval (December 7, 1295 – December 9, 1384) was the daughter of Arthur II, Duke of Brittany and Yolande of Dreux, Queen of Scotland.

== Family ==
Beatrice married Guy X of Laval (1295–1347), the eldest son of Guy IX of Laval, on March 2, 1315. She had three children:

- Guy XI of Laval (died in 1348)
- Guy XII of Laval (died in 1412)
- Catherine of Laval (died before 1378), first wife of Olivier V de Clisson (died in 1407), Count of Porhoet

Her husband died on June 18, 1347, at the Battle of La Roche-Derrien. Her son was taken prisoner there, as was Charles, Duke of Brittany. Beatrice negotiated the latter's ransom, buying him back for a large sum of money.

She was buried at Clermont Abbey next to the high altar, opposite that of her son, Guy XII. Couanier de Launay indicates that her tome could still be seen in the 19th century where it was inscribed:

"Here lies noble lady Béatrix de Bretaigne, lady of Laval and Vitré, daughter of Duke Arthur, formerly Duke of Brittany and of the Queen of Scotland, which Béatrix died on the 7th day of December in the year 1344"
