= Emmanuel Amand de Mendieta =

Emmanuel Amand de Mendieta (1907–1976) was a Belgian Benedictine scholar who specialised in the works of St. Basil of Caesarea. Of Belgian aristocratic descent, he attained a brief prominence in the English-speaking world through his conversion to Anglicanism in 1962.

De Mendieta was born in Bouvignes-sur-Meuse in 1907 and entered the novitiate at Maredsous in 1925—shortly before the Malines Conversations between Roman Catholics and Anglicans—and was given the name of Dom David. He was professed in 1930. He was ordained a Catholic priest in 1932. He became a noted patristics scholar and an international authority on St. Basil of Caesarea.

In 1956 de Mendieta announced his conversion to the Church of England. He left Belgium and moved to Great Britain, where he was received into the Church. After several years of teaching at various smaller colleges, he was named a canon, that is a canon residentiary, of Winchester Cathedral and thus a member of the Cathedral Chapter. Of studious disposition his career at the cathedral reflected his monastic experience in his general lack of knowledge of some standard procedures of modern life. Publishing in several European languages, he continued to live a relatively secluded existence after his move to England.

De Mendieta's acceptance of an office in the Anglican Church invited a journalist's comparison with the case of de Dominis' appointment to the Deanery of Windsor under King James I. It was also subsequently noted that the 20th-century cleric, Charles Davis, did not opt for a similar route when he left the Roman Catholic Church. (Other distinguished early foreign appointments to Anglican canonries, but from Protestant backgrounds, were Isaac Casaubon, Gerrit and Isaac Vossius).

== Selected works ==
- Fatalisme et liberté dans l'antiquité grecque: recherches sur la survivance de l'argumentation morale anti-fataliste de Carnéade chez les philosophes grecs et les théologiens chrétiens des quatre premiers siècles, 1945
- L'Ascèse monastique de saint Basile, Essai historique, Maredsous, 1948
- Damase, Athanase, Pierre, Mélèce et Basile, in L' Eglise et l'église. Travaux offerts à dom Lambert Beauduin I, Chevetogne, 1954
- Le Mont-Athos, la presqu'île des caloyers, Bruges, Paris, 1957, completed by L'Art au Mont-Athos, 1977
- with Stig Y. Rudberg, Basilius von Caesarea:Homilien zum Hexaemeron, Akademie Verlag, Berlin, 1997
- with S.Y. Rudberg, Basile de Césarée. La tradition manuscrite directe des neuf homélies sur l'Hexamèron, Texte u. Untersuchungen, Berlin 1980
- Rome and Canterbury: A Biblical and free Catholicism, 1961
- 'Honest to God': Three Sermons delivered in Winchester Cathedral, 1963
- Anglican Vision, S.P.C.K., 1971
- The “Unwritten” and “Secret” Apostolic Traditions in the Theological Thought of St. Basil of Caesarea. Scottish Journal of Theology No. 13. 1965.
- numerous articles in monastic and theological journals.

== See also ==
- Catholic Church in Belgium
