= Bouvignes-sur-Meuse =

Village of Wallonia, Belgium

Coordinates: 50°16′N 4°54′E

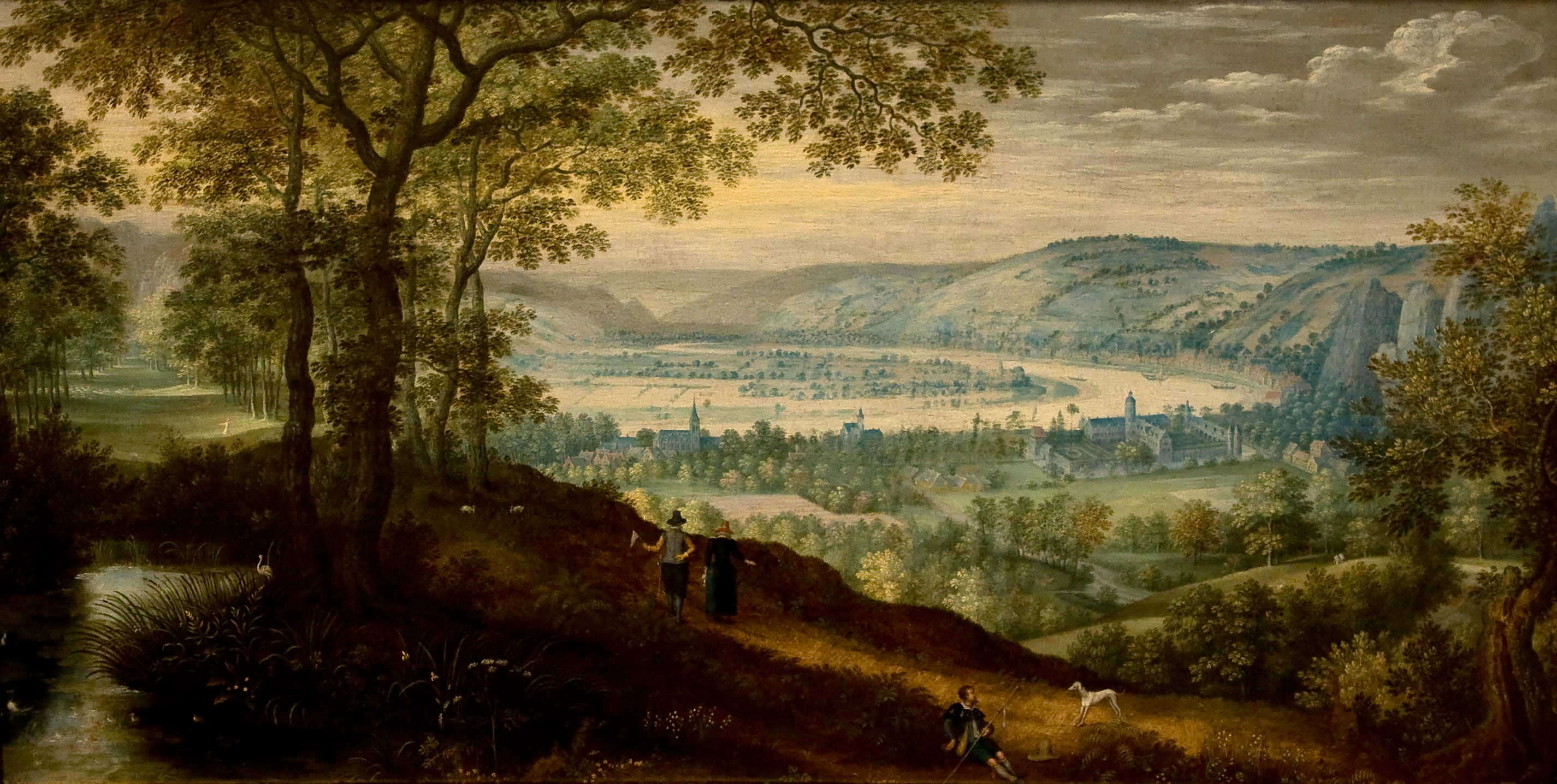
Bouvignes (left bank) opposite Dinant, Lucas van Valckenborch (1535-1597)

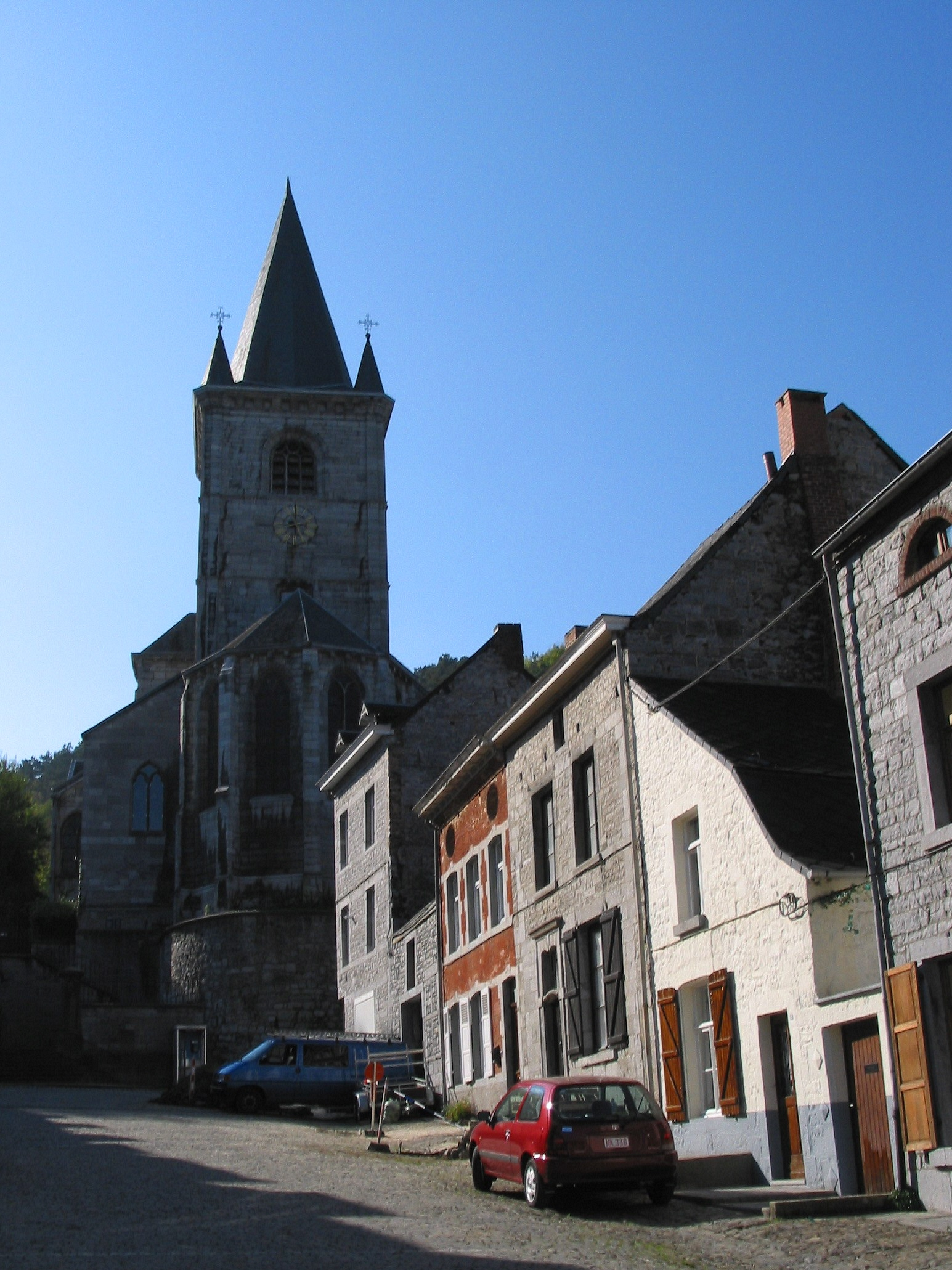
The neighbourhood of St. Lambert's church (13th-20th centuries)

Bouvignes-sur-Meuse (French pronunciation: [buviɲ syʁ møz], lit. 'Bouvignes on Meuse'; Walloon: Bovegne) is a village of Wallonia and a district of the municipality of Dinant, located in the province of Namur, Belgium, on the River Meuse.

== History ==
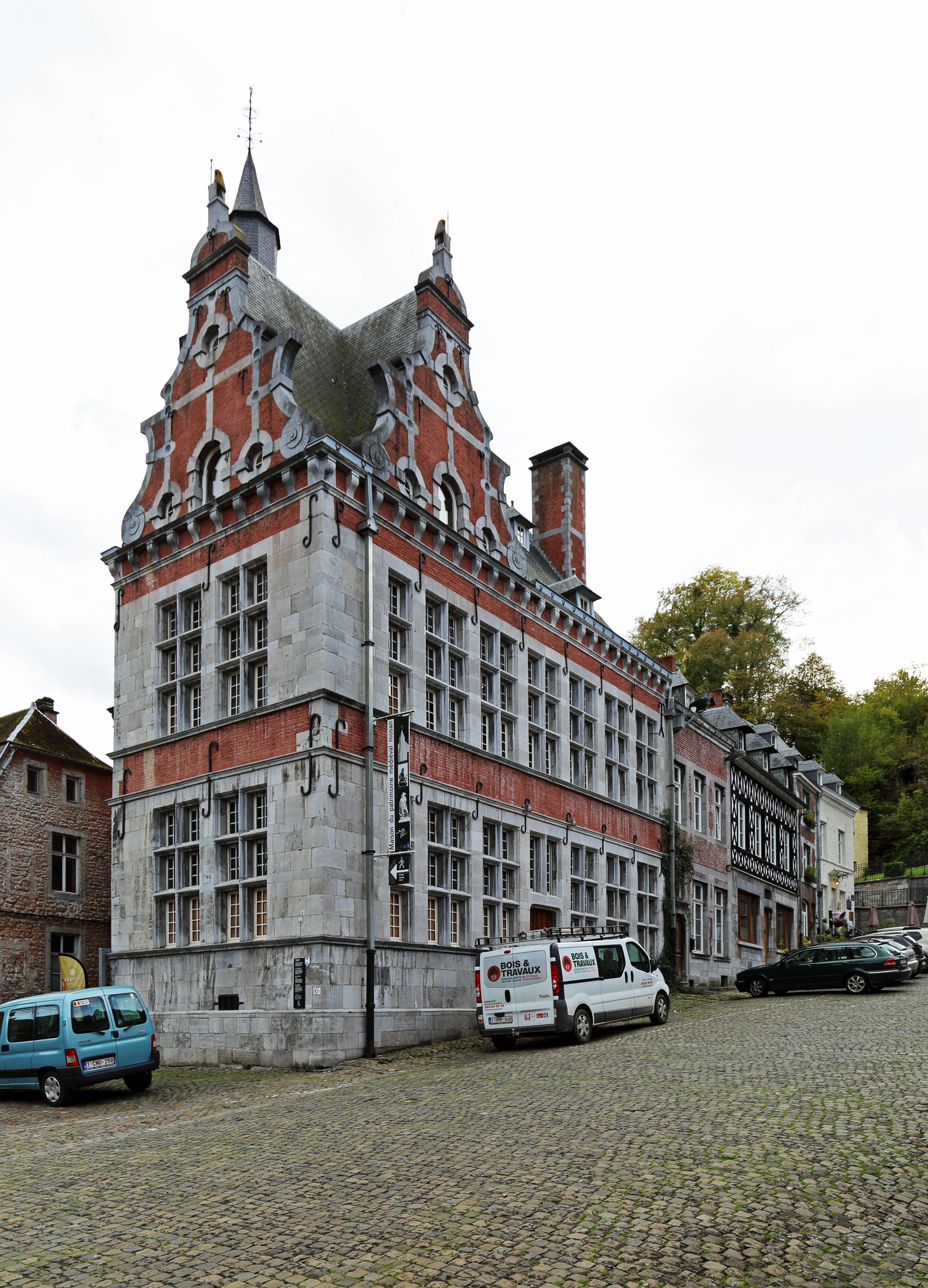
The Spanish House at Bouvignes

In medieval times there was a lot of conflict between Bouvignes and neighbouring town of Dinant, on the opposite bank of the river, and at this point Bouvignes was a fortified town. This hostility was due to that Bouvignes was part of the County of Namur and Dinant was part of the Principality of Liège.

In 1320, on a high rock cliff next to the town, Crèvecœur Castle was constructed to build up the defences of Bouvignes during the hostilities. The castle was modified during the 14th and 15th centuries.

In 1554 King Henry II of France sacked both Bouvignes and Dinant, and went on to besiege Crèvecœur Castle in Bouvignes. The castle held out, with leadership of the defence being taken over by the wives of three officers, but eventually the fighting ceased because the defenders had run out of ammunition. At this, the three wives threw themselves hand-in-hand off the castle walls, preferring to die than to be captured. Crèvecœur Castle is now freely accessible, offering beautiful views over the river and scenery.

In municipal terms, the commune was merged with Dinant in 1965. Either it or Dinant was the birthplace of the first specialist landscape painter, Joachim Patinir (d. 1524).

== See also ==
- Emmanuel Amand de Mendieta, (1907–1976) a Belgian Benedictine scholar
