= Guy XVII, Comte de Laval (Clouet) =

1540 oil painting by François Clouet

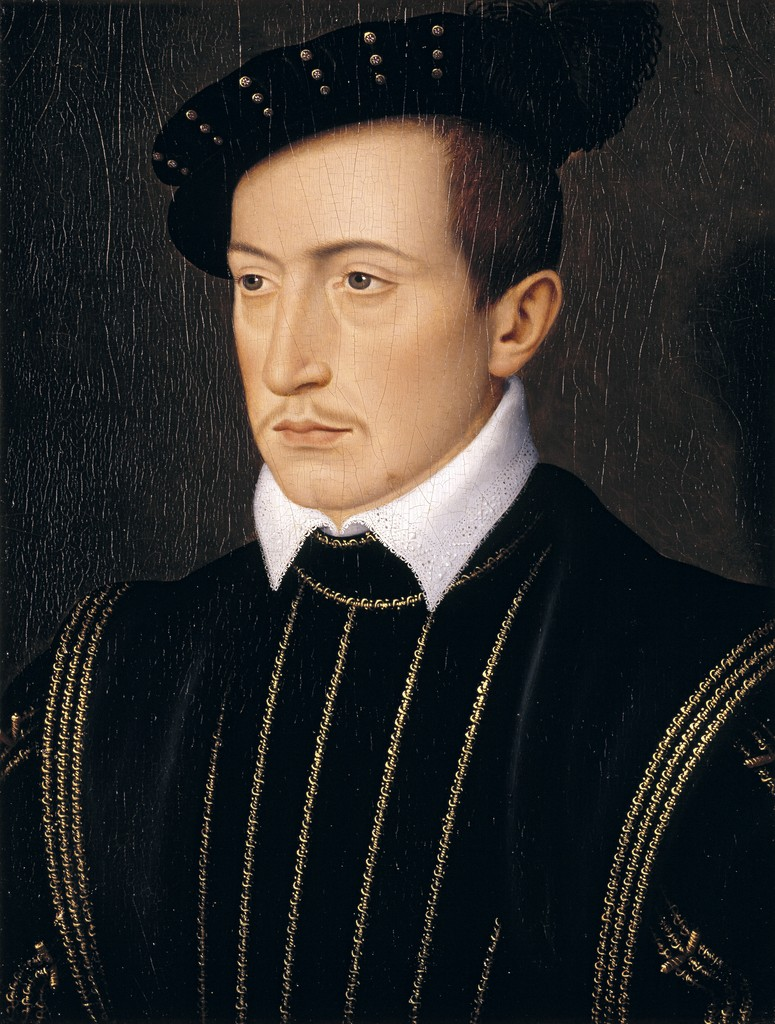
- Artist: François Clouet
- Location: Timken Museum of Art, San Diego, California, U.S.

Guy XVII, Comte de Laval is a c. 1540 oil painting by François Clouet.
