= Jeanne de Laval =

Wife of René of Anjou (1433–1498)

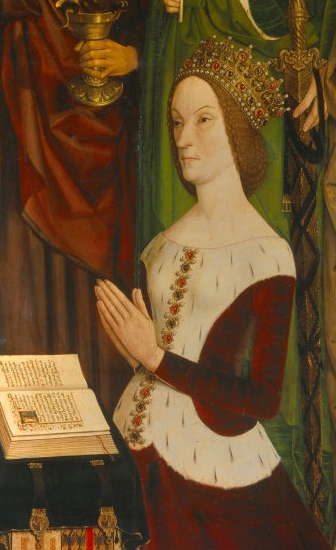
- Jeanne de Laval in the Burning Bush triptych by Nicholas Froment

Duchess consort of Anjou and Bar Countess consort of Provence
- Tenure: 10 September 1454 – 10 July 1480
- Born: 10 November 1433; Auray, Brittany, France
- Died: 19 December 1498 (aged 65); Chateau de Beaufort-en-Vallée, Maine-et-Loire
- Spouse: René of Anjou
- House: Laval
- Father: Guy XIV de Laval, Count of Laval
- Mother: Isabella of Brittany

Jeanne de Laval (10 November 1433 – 19 December 1498), was the second wife and titular queen consort of René, Duke of Anjou and Bar and former King of Naples and Sicily.

== Early life ==
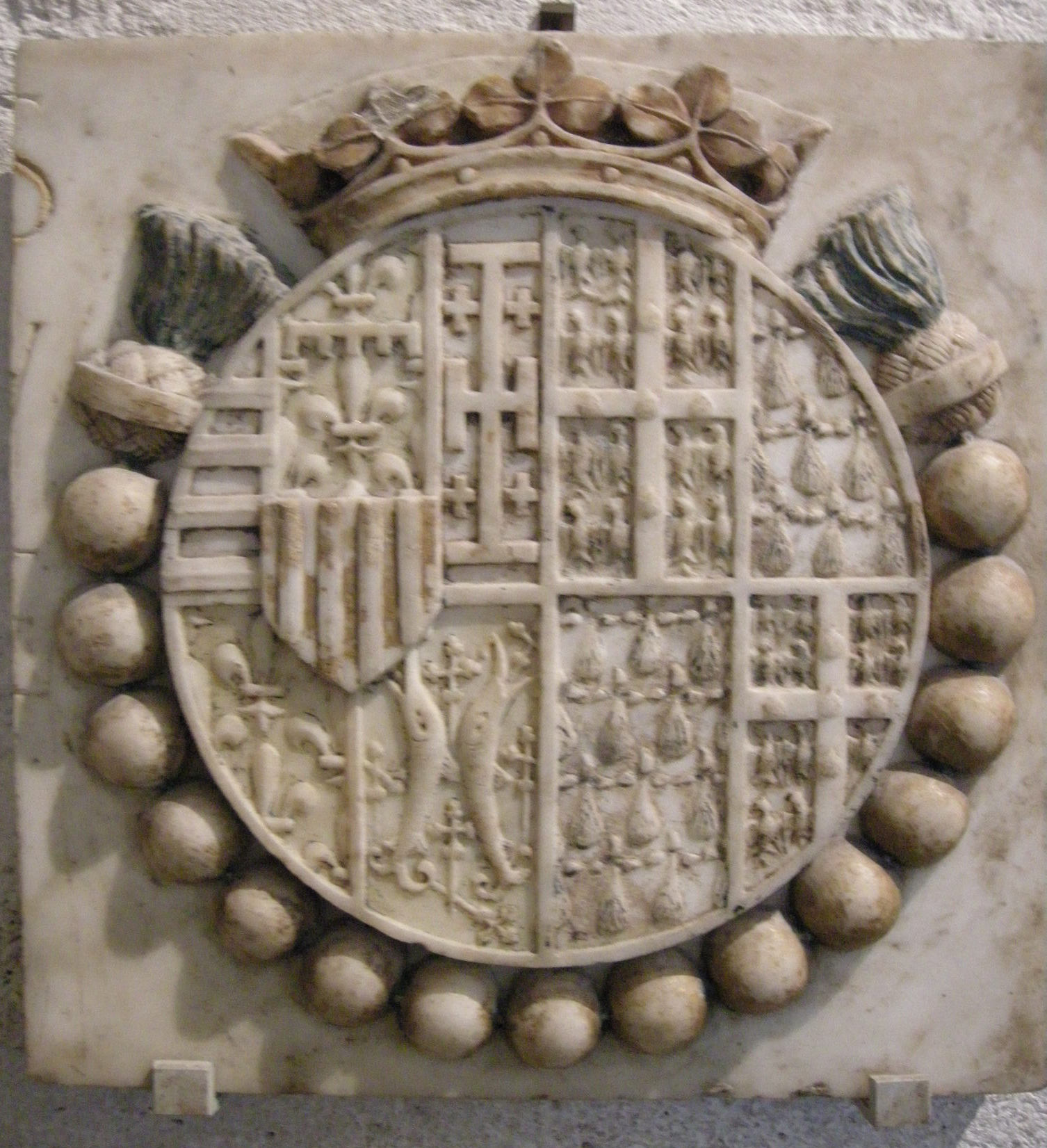
Combined coat of arms of Jeanne and her husband René of Naples. Marble with traces of polychromy, from the base of the Bearing of the Cross altarpiece in Saint-Didier at Avignon.

Jeanne was born on 10 November 1433 at Auray, Brittany, the daughter of Guy XIV de Laval, Count of Laval and Isabella of Brittany. Her father Guy fought with Joan of Arc.

== Marriage ==
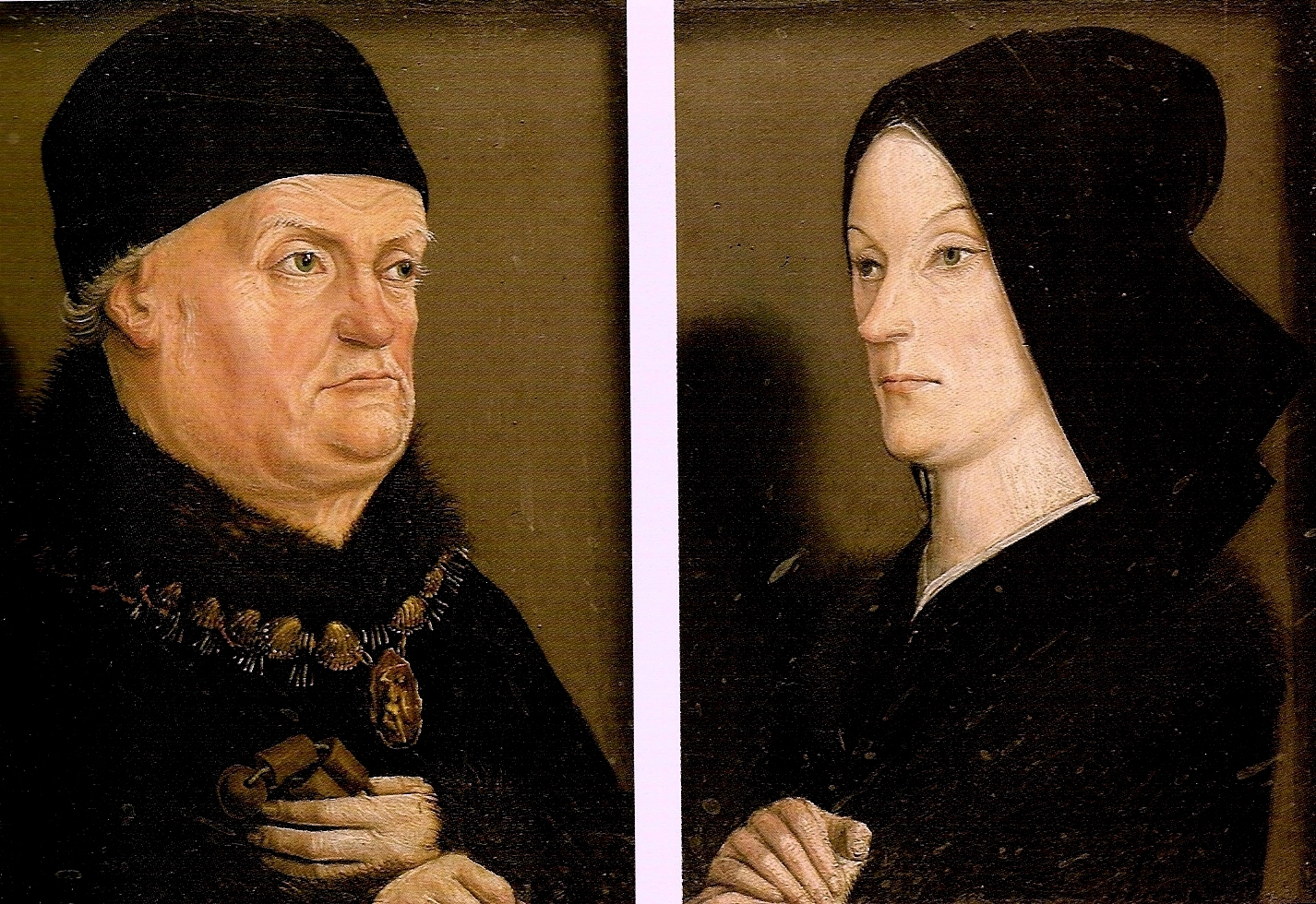
Portrait of René of Anjou and Jeanne de Laval, by Nicolas Froment.

A marriage contract was drawn up on 3 September 1454 between Jeanne's father and King René of Naples and Sicily. The wedding was celebrated on 10 September 1454, at the Abbey of St. Nicholas in Angers. At the age of twenty-one Jeanne married René, whose first wife, Isabella of Lorraine, had died the previous year. Jeanne's husband was more than twenty years her senior. The marriage, however, was happy. Jeanne, who was sweet and affectionate, seems to have been much loved by her husband. She became stepmother to René's children, who included the future John II, Duke of Lorraine, Margaret of Anjou, and Yolande, Duchess of Lorraine. Jeanne's marriage to René was childless.

After living three years in the surrounding mansions of Angers and Saumur, Jeanne and René lived in Provence in 1457 to 1462. They lived in Anjou from 1462 to 1469. In Aix-en-Provence, Angers, Jeanne participated with her husband in literary and scholarly pursuits at his court.

René composed a 10,000 verse ode to Jeanne entitled, "The Idyl of Regnault and Jeanneton". The poem was a debate on love between a shepherd and shepherdess with a pilgrim as arbiter. However, it sometimes seems to contain a good dose of conventional fiction. During his stay at Tarascon in Provence, René granted Jeanne the barony of Les Baux, which belonged to the Counts of Provence. She exchanged it on 18 February 1475 at Aix-en-Provence for Berre. She continued to live in Provence from 1469 to 1480.

== Later life ==
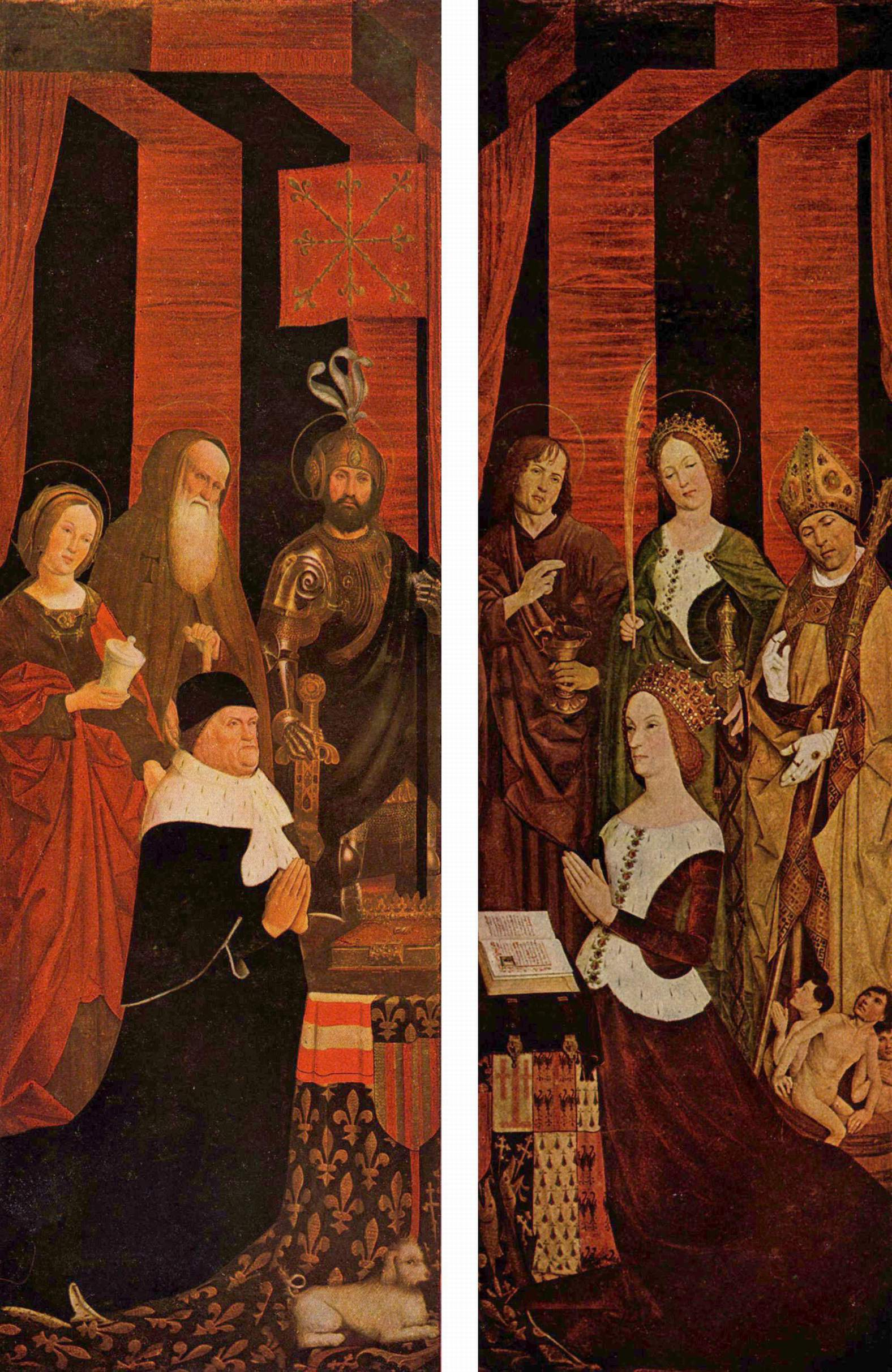
Detail of the Burning Bush triptych, which shows Jeanne de Laval and René I of Anjou.

René died on 10 July 1480. In his will, he bequeathed his wife a very large income in Anjou, Provence, and the Barrois. She also retained the County of Beaufort and the lordship of Mirebeau (exchanged with the baronies of Aubagne and Provence). After her husband's death, she sometimes lived in Beaufort and sometimes in Saumur. She was popular for her kindness and generosity. The people of Beaufort were grateful to her when she regulated the use of common pastures. Jeanne died on 19 December 1498 at the Chateau de Beaufort-en-Vallée, Maine-et-Loire. She was sixty-five years of age. A street still bears her name, "Queen of Sicily." By her will, she wished to be buried simply, without any monument, in the cathedral of Angers. Her heart was placed in the Cordeliers d'Angers, alongside that of her husband.

== Jeanne and the arts ==
Jeanne and her husband René appear in the triptych of the Burning Bush of the cathedral of Aix-en-Provence, painted by Nicolas Froment, and a painting in the museum of Cluny, where she is represented with King René listening to the preaching of Sainte-Madeleine. Jeanne used the Burning Bush triptych to illuminate a psalter (ms. 41 of the Public Library of Poitiers). The Cabinet of medals of the National Library of France has two medals, the 'King René and Queen Jeanne dating from 1462. It consists of a miniature of Jeanne, surrounded by her ladies, in the manuscript of the French version of the Pilgrimage of Life (in the Bibliothèque de l'Arsenal). Monuments to Jeanne have been raised in Beaufort (1842), Rosiers-d'Égletons (1875), and Tarascon. A statue of Jeanne can be seen in the "Public Garden" in the Noisay village in Indre-et-Loire.

== Sources ==
- Kekewich, Margaret L. (2008). The Good King: Rene of Anjou and Fifteenth Century Europe. Palgrave Macmillan. ISBN 978-1-4039-8820-1.
