= André de Laval-Montmorency =

Breton knight and Marshal of France

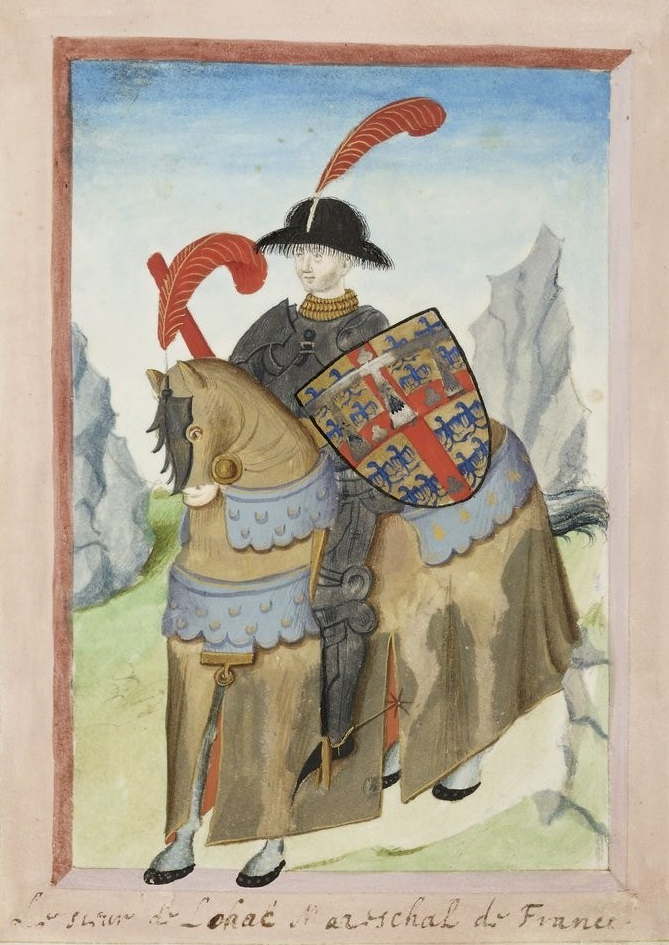
André as depicted in the Armorial de Gilles Le Bouvier

André de Laval-Montmorency (c. 1408 – 1485), seigneur de Lohéac, was a Breton knight and a Marshal of France. He was the son of Guy XIII de Laval and Anne de Laval, and a leading member of the House of Laval.

In 1423 he served in the French army against England and fought in the Battle of La Brossinière where he was knighted. He wielded the sword of Bertrand du Guesclin, a symbol of Breton support for France which he had inherited from his maternal grandmother, Jeanne de Laval, who was the widow of the famous constable. In 1428 André was taken prisoner by John Talbot, 1st Earl of Shrewsbury, after the capitulation of Laval, which he was defending. After paying his ransom he was present with Joan of Arc at the Siege of Orléans (1428–1429), at the Battle of Patay, and at the coronation of Charles VII. He was made admiral of France in 1437 and marshal in 1439.

He served Charles VII faithfully in all his wars, even against the dauphin (1456), and when the latter became king as Louis XI, Laval was dismissed from the marshal's office. After the War of the Public Weal he was restored to favor, and recovered the marshal's baton, the king also granting him the offices of lieutenant-general to the government of Paris and governor of Picardy, and conferring upon him the collar of the Order of St Michael. In 1472 Laval was successful in resisting the attacks of Charles the Bold, duke of Burgundy, on Beauvais.

André married Marie de Rais, also of the House of Laval, and daughter of Gilles de Rais.
