= Guy XIII de Laval =

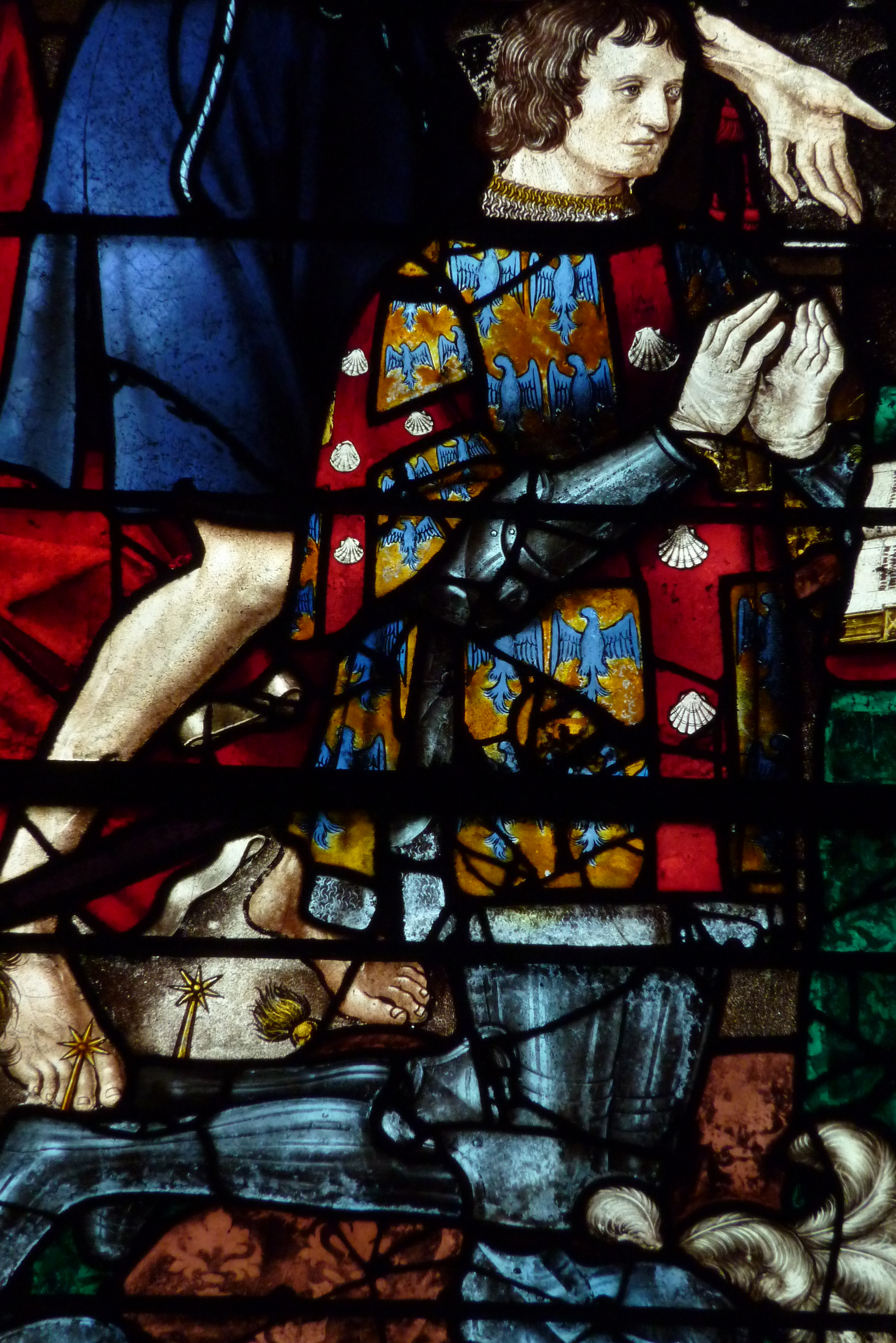
Detail of stained glass window No. 5 (16th Century), Church of Saint-Martin (Collégiale Saint-Martin) in Montmorency, Val-d'Oise, with donor portrait of Guy de Laval.

Guy XIII de Laval, born Jean de Montfort, (Note: Jean de Montfort, according to the marriage contract had to jettison his name and family's arms and take up the name "Guy of Laval" and the arms of the House of Laval) (1385- 14 August 1414, Rhodes) was seigneur of Laval and of Kergorlay. He was the son of Raoul IX de Montfort and Jeanne de Kergorlay.

Guy inherited the Laval title through his marriage on 22 January 1404 to Anne de Laval. As daughter and sole heir to Guy XII de Laval, Anne was "dame de Laval", and one of the conditions of the marriage was that any children born to it would bear the name and arms of the House of Laval. (The same condition had already been applied to the marriage of Emma de Laval with Mathieu II de Montmorency.) Nevertheless, Jean de Montfort renounced the name and title he had been born with to take up the name of Guy XIII de Laval, better to associate himself with his wife Anne's power. From the couple were descended several bishops and the greatest seigneurs of Brittany. Guy and Anne had 5 children:

- Guy XIV de Laval
- André de Lohéac
- Louis de Laval
- Jeanne de Laval (Dame de Campzillon), who in 1424 married Louis I de Bourbon-Vendôme
- Catherine de Laval (Dame de Chauvigny) who married Guy de Chauvigny vicomte de Brosse

Guy XIII died of plague on his return from a pilgrimage to the Holy Land.

== Sources ==
- Walsby, Malcolm (2007). The Counts of Laval: Culture, Patronage and Religion in Fifteenth- and Sixteenth-Century France. Ashgate.
