= Crèvecœur Castle =

Castle in Wallonia, Belgium

Coordinates: 50.273°N 4.896°E

- Wallonia, Belgium
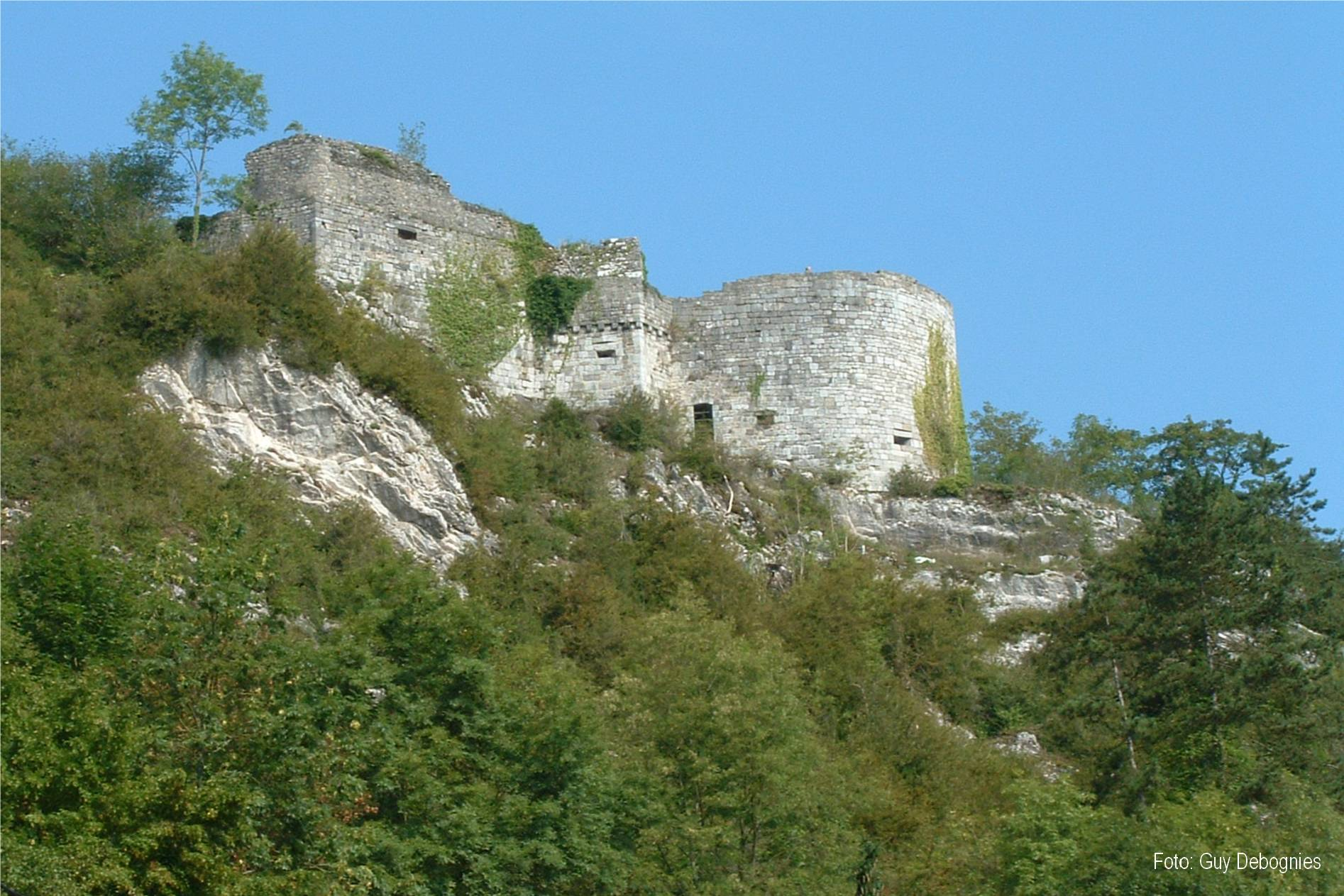

Site information
- Type: Castle
- Owner: Walloon Region
- Open to the public: Yes
- Condition: Ruin

Crèvecœur Castle (French: Château de Crèvecœur) is a ruined castle in Bouvignes-sur-Meuse, Belgium, part of the city of Dinant and province of Namur, Wallonia. It is owned by the Walloon Region. Its field can be visited freely all year.

== Etymology ==
During a siege against the castle around 1430, three knights are said to have defended the castle to defend their wives, but were killed in battle; their wives in turn took up arms in revenge, but were likewise killed. Heartbroken and believing all was lost, the ladies of the castle donned long white robes, climbed the parapet, and jumped off together to their deaths. This legend is the origin of the castle's name, Crèvecœur ("broken heart"). Since at least 1778, the original context has been distorted and the legend has been tied to the French siege of 1554.

== Description ==
The actual castle of Crèvecœur rises on a cliff eighty meters above the Meuse. The core is formed by a square keep from ca. 1320. Along the keep, two staircases of twelve steps give access to a protruding, semi-circular bastille from the 15th century. The full length of forty meters reached Crèvecœur ca. 1430.

Below Crèvecœur is the old count's castle, which is three times as long and whose ruins are situated on three levels. The highest and also the oldest is at the height of the Romanesque keep (floor plan 15 x 11.5 metres). On a second terrace, five meters lower, was the farmstead, which was extended in the 13th century toward Sint-Lambertuskerk. This part contains a still remarkably well-preserved cellar. The Saint Catherine's Chapel, the coinage and the large hall that served as town hall were also located here. The third and lowest terrace came up against the Sint-Lambertus Church.

== History ==
Already at the end of the 11th century, Godfrey I, Count of Namur had a fortress built at Bouvignes. His son Henry the Blind had heavy walls built around it. Archaeologically identified fire marks are associated with a siege of Bouvignes in 1188 by Baldwin V, Count of Hainaut. Knights from the County of Champagne then came to help the Namur with the defence. On behalf of Ermesinde, Countess of Luxembourg, Waleran III, Duke of Limburg besieged the castle in 1214, but this time it held out.

From the 14th century, it was the people of Liège who threatened the castle. A first siege took place in 1321 without success. Presumably just before that, around 1320, the square tower of Crèvecœur was erected on a separate rock. In the old feud between Bouvignes in Namur and Dinant in Liège, this building was a response to the tower of Montorgueil that the Dinantians had built on the other side of the Meuse. Crèvecœur was extended in 1388 by master builder Godefroid de Bofiaule and later received a semicircular extension (bastille). A third construction phase took place during and after a new siege.

That happened when Bouvignes was in Burgundian hands. The captain of Crèvecœur, Jean le Blondel (Blondeau), tried to capture the tower of Montorgueil on the night of 5 to 6 February 1429. At the request of the Dinantezen, Prince-Bishop John of Heinsberg launched the Wars of Liège of 1429–1431. Despite the use of a "cat" (medieval assault construction) and serious damage to the castle, the people of Liège were unable to enter. With the arrival of Philip the Good, the siege was broken down and a truce was concluded.

After many quarrels, sieges and battles, Dinant and Bouvignes finally met the same fate: in 1554 they were sacked by the French soldiers of King Henry II of France. Because of the resistance against the French army, Crèvecœur Castle was heavily damaged by artillery. It lost its military function and was manned only as a watchtower. To this end, it was partly rebuilt between 1567 and 1580. In 1655 the French took the castle one last time and in 1672 it was dismantled under the supervision of François d'Otreppe.

On 13 May 1940, during the Battle of France of World War II, Wehrmacht troops from the II./Schützen-Regiment 7 (a unit from the 7th Panzer Division under the command of Erwin Rommel) seized the castle from the French Army II/66e régiment d'infanterie after crossing the Meuse.

The ruin was restored in 1950–1951.

== See also ==
- List of castles in Belgium
