= Laval Castle (France) =

Castle

- Château de Laval (French)
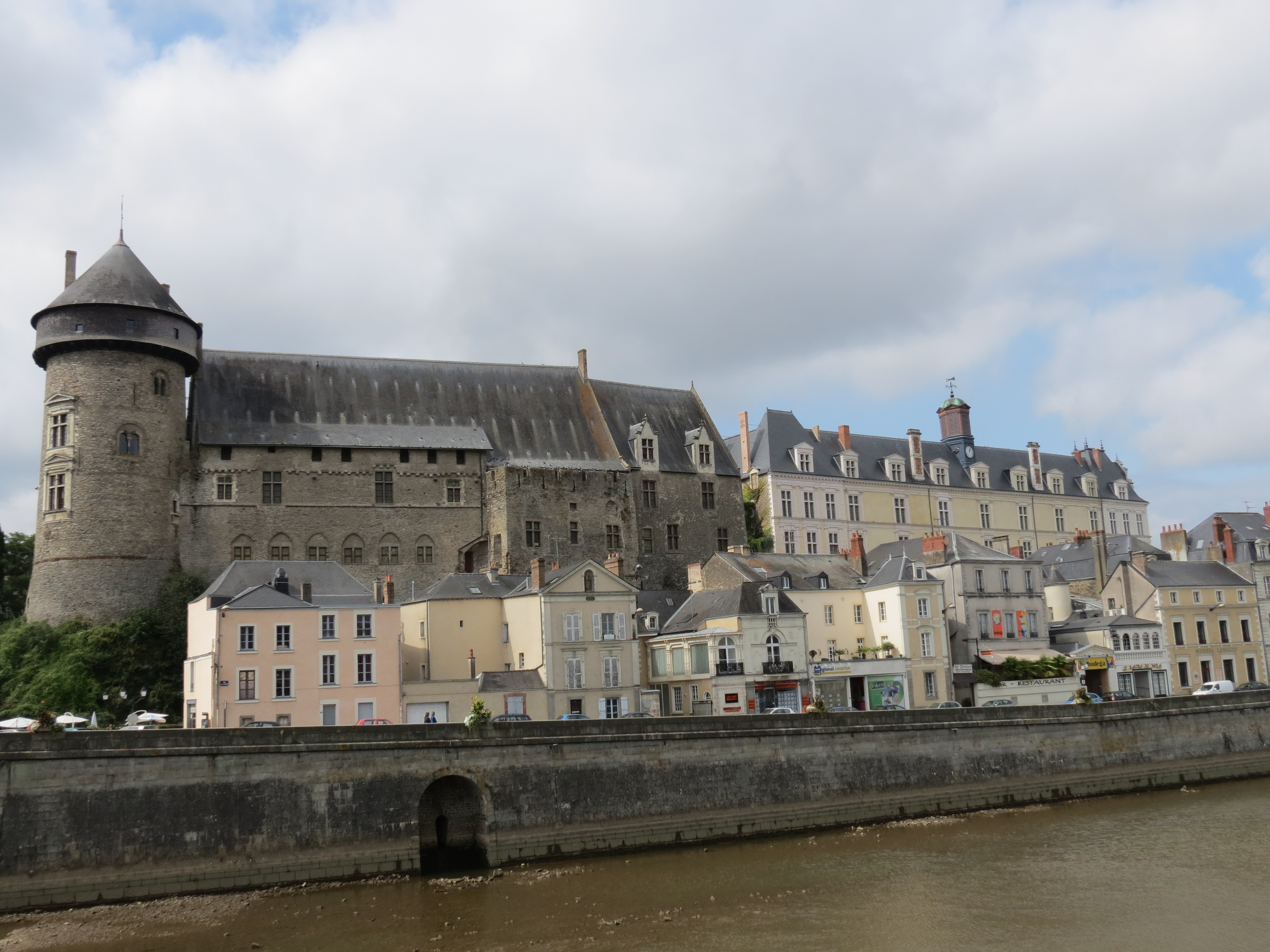
- The Old Castle seen from the banks of the Mayenne, with the New Castle as an extension.

- Location within France
- 48°04′07″N -0°46′17″W
- Location: Laval, France

History
- Built: 11th-15th centuries
- Built for: Counts of Laval

Site notes
- Architectural styles: Medieval, Renaissance
- Current use: Museum
- Owner: City of Laval
- Website: https://www.laval.fr/laval-la-ville/la-ville/laval-ville-dart-et-dhistoire/le-chateau-de-laval

Monument historique
- Designated: 1840, 2006

The Laval Castle (in French: Château de Laval) is a castle in Laval, in the French department of Mayenne. Its foundation in the 10th century allowed the birth of the city. Emblematic monument of Laval, it occupies a rocky promontory above the Mayenne River. It is composed of two distinct ensembles: the Old Castle (in French: Vieux-Château), which corresponds to the medieval fortified castle, and the New Castle (in French: Château-Neuf), a Renaissance gallery transformed into a courthouse in the 19th century. These two monuments are on the list of the first 1,034 French historical monuments classified in 1840.

The history of the Château de Laval is closely linked to that of the House of Laval, which began with Guy I, the founder of the castle. The monument bears witness to the multiple alliances contracted by this family, as well as to its power, which grew from the 11th century until its disappearance at the end of the Renaissance. The Old Castle is remarkable for its 11th-century chapel as well as for its imposing main tower, topped by a 13th-century wooden hoarding, an exceptional example of medieval military architecture. The richly worked bays of the medieval dwellings, built in the early 16th century, and the gallery of the Château-Neuf, dating from the 1540s, are striking elements of the Renaissance that show the evolution of architecture at that time.

Since the relocation of the judicial services in the 2000s, the Château-Neuf has been awaiting reconversion. The Old Castle, which served as a prison from the Revolution to 1911, has been open to the public since the 1920s. Initially devoted to archaeology, natural history and decorative arts, it has been home to the Musée d'Art naïf et d'Arts singuliers de Laval since 1967. This museum presents works by numerous artists representative of Naive art and Art Singulier.

== See also ==
- List of castles in France

== Bibliographic sources ==
- Samuel Chollet, Stéphane Hiland et Sébastien Legros, « Les châteaux du Moyen-Âge en Mayenne », Société d’Archéologie et d’Histoire de la Mayenne, 2017
- Antoinette Le Falher, « Musée art naïf, arts singuliers : guide du visiteur », Ville de Laval, 2016
- Jean-Michel Gousset et Samuel Chollet, « Laval. Nouvelle datation dendrochronologique de la tour maîtresse du château et de son hourd », Bulletin Monumental, 2012
- Samuel Chollet, « L'accès au donjon du château de Laval », La Mayenne, Archéologie, Histoire, 2006
- Malcolm Walsby, « Vivre à la cour des comtes de Laval », La Mayenne, Archéologie, Histoire, 2006
- Séverine Guillotte, « Un mécénat de transition », La Mayenne, Archéologie, Histoire, 2006
- Jean-Michel Gousset et Samuel Chollet, « Mayenne. Laval, datation dendrochronologique des hourds du donjon », Bulletin Monumental, 2006
- Xavier Villebrun, « Un emblème pour la ville de Laval », La Mayenne, Archéologie, Histoire, 2004
- Estelle Fresneau, « Laval : des musées pour un château », La Mayenne, Archéologie, Histoire, 2004
- Antoinette Le Falher, « Le château de Laval vu par le 19e siècle », La Mayenne, Archéologie, Histoire, 2004
- Jean-Michel Gousset, « Y a-t-il deux donjons au château de Laval ? », La Mayenne, Archéologie, Histoire, 2004
- Armelle Pain, Marylène Cudeville et Valérie Mansard, Le patrimoine des communes de la Mayenne », vol. 2, Flohic, 2002
- Dominique Eraud, « La galerie des comtes de Laval : vous avez dit Pierre Lescot ? », La Mayenne, Archéologie, Histoire, 2000
- Dominique Eraud, « Le château de Laval. Forteresse et résidence d’agrément », Monuments historiques, 1993
- Gilbert Chaussis, « Laval, de rue en rue », vol. 1, Laval, Siloë, 1991
- Dominique Eraud, « Laval, Mayenne », Paris, Éd. du Patrimoine, 1990
- Dominique Eraud, « Laval : le château : Mayenne / Inventaire général des monuments et des richesses artistiques de la France, région des Pays de la Loire », Association pour le développement de l'Inventaire général en pays de la Loire, 1988
- Éric Mare, « La chapelle du Vieux Château de Laval : les fouilles de 1987 », La Mayenne, Archéologie, Histoire, 1988
- Jacques Naveau, « Données nouvelles sur le château de Laval : les fouilles de 1980 », La Mayenne, Archéologie, Histoire, 1982
- Madeleine Pré, « Les façades sculptées du Château de Laval », Gazette des Beaux-Arts, 1962
- Louis-Julien Morin de la Beauluère, « Le château de Laval, Laval », Goupil, 1892
