= Anne de Laval (1385–1466) =

Coat of Arms of the House of Laval

Anne de Laval (1385 – 25 January 1466) was a French noblewoman. She was the ruling Dame/Seigneur de Laval in 1414–1429.

She was the daughter of Jeanne de Laval-Tinténiac and her second husband Guy XII de Laval (died 1412), governor of Brittany and baron of Laval (Jeanne's first husband had been Bertrand du Guesclin).

== Titles ==
Anne was the hereditary dame of Laval, hereditary baronne of Vitré, hereditary countess of Rennes, of Châtillon, of Gavre, of Acquigny, of Aubigné, Courbeveille, hereditary dame of Tinténiac, of Bécherel and of Romillé. She inherited all these titles from the successive accidental deaths of her two brothers, Guy and Francois.

== Family ==
On 22 January 1404, as daughter and sole heir of Guy XII de Laval, she married Jean de Montfort, lord of Montfort and of Kergolay.

One of the conditions of the marriage was that any children born to it would bear the name and arms of Laval. Jean de Montfort renounced the name and title he had been born with to take up the name of Guy XIII de Laval, better to associate himself with his wife Anne's power. Guy and Anne had 5 children:

- Guy XIV de Laval
- André de Lohéac
- Louis de Laval(d.1489)
- Jeanne de Laval (Dame de Campzillon), who in 1424 married Louis I de Bourbon-Vendôme
- Catherine de Laval (Dame de Chauvigny) who married Guy de Chauvigny vicomte de Brosse

== Sources ==
- Walsby, Malcolm (2007). The Counts of Laval: Culture, Patronage and Religion in Fifteenth- and Sixteenth-Century France. Ashgate.

Preceded by Guy XIII de Laval	Dame/Seigneur de Laval; 1414–1429	Succeeded by Guy XIV de Laval
