= Acquigny =

- Commune
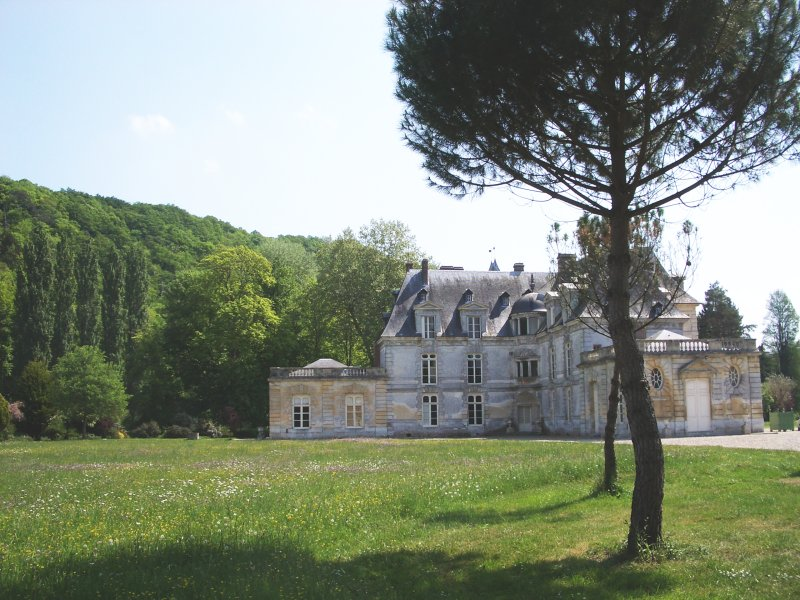
- The château in Acquigny

- Coat of arms
- Location of Acquigny
- Location within France Location within Normandy
- Coordinates: 49°10′26″N 1°10′44″E
- Country: France
- Region: Normandy
- Department: Eure
- Arrondissement: Les Andelys
- Canton: Pont-de-l'Arche
- Intercommunality: CA Seine-Eure

Government
  - Mayor (2020–2026): Patrick Collet
- Area^{1}: 17.83 km^{2} (6.88 sq mi)
- Elevation: 19 m (62 ft)
- Highest elevation: 143 m (469 ft)
- Lowest elevation: 14 m (46 ft)
- Population (2023): 1,733
  - Density: 97.20/km^{2} (251.7/sq mi)
- Time zone: UTC+01:00 (CET)
  - Summer (DST): UTC+02:00 (CEST)
- INSEE/Postal code: 27003 /27400
- ^{1} French Land Register data, which excludes lakes, ponds, glaciers > 1 km^{2} (0.386 sq mi or 247 acres) and river estuaries.

Acquigny (French pronunciation: [akiɲi]) is a commune in the Eure department in Normandy in northern France. The 16th century Château d'Acquigny is located here.

== Population ==
Historical population
Year	Pop.	±% p.a.
1968	975	—
1975	1,006	+0.45%
1982	1,055	+0.68%
1990	1,292	+2.57%
1999	1,438	+1.20%
2007	1,611	+1.43%
2012	1,529	−1.04%
2017	1,586	+0.73%
2023	1,733	+1.49%
Source: INSEE

== See also ==
- Communes of the Eure department
