= Tinténiac =

Tinténiac Teintenyac (Gallo) Tintenieg (Breton)
- Commune
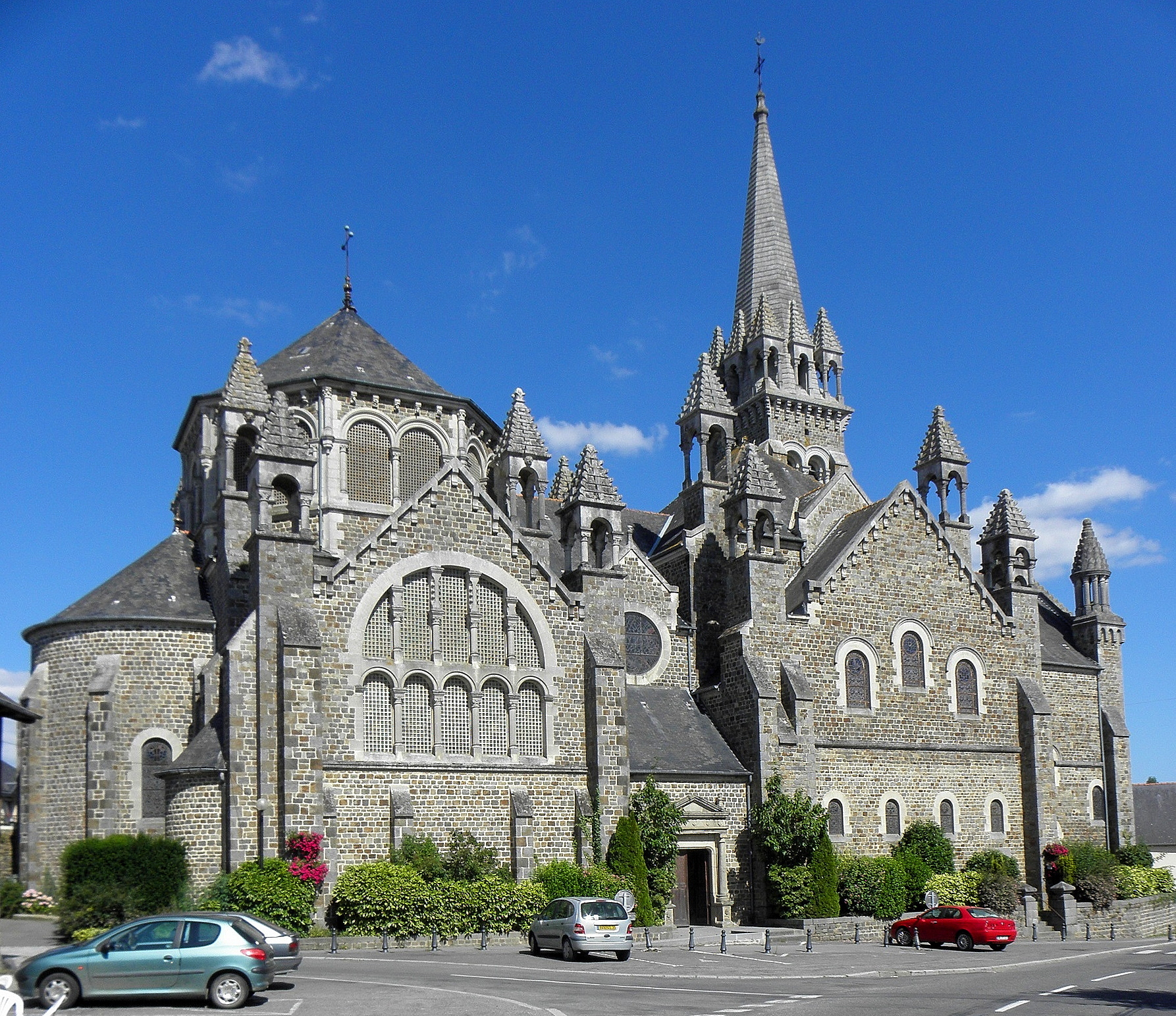
- The church in Tinténiac

- Coat of arms
- Location of Tinténiac
- Location within France Location within Brittany
- Coordinates: 48°19′47″N 1°50′01″W
- Country: France
- Region: Brittany
- Department: Ille-et-Vilaine
- Arrondissement: Saint-Malo
- Canton: Combourg
- Intercommunality: CC Bretagne Romantique

Government
  - Mayor (2020–2026): Christian Toczé
- Area^{1}: 23.40 km^{2} (9.03 sq mi)
- Highest elevation: 90 m (300 ft)
- Lowest elevation: 31 m (102 ft)
- Population (2023): 3,939
  - Density: 168.3/km^{2} (436.0/sq mi)
- Time zone: UTC+01:00 (CET)
  - Summer (DST): UTC+02:00 (CEST)
- INSEE/Postal code: 35337 /35190
- ^{1} French Land Register data, which excludes lakes, ponds, glaciers > 1 km^{2} (0.386 sq mi or 247 acres) and river estuaries.

Tinténiac (French pronunciation: [tɛ̃tenjak]; Breton: Tintenieg; Gallo: Teintenyac) is a commune in the Ille-et-Vilaine department in Brittany in northwestern France.

== Population ==
Inhabitants of Tinténiac are called Tinténiacais in French.

Historical population
Year	Pop.	±% p.a.
1968	1,938	—
1975	2,040	+0.74%
1982	2,173	+0.91%
1990	2,163	−0.06%
1999	2,434	+1.32%
2007	3,163	+3.33%
2012	3,370	+1.28%
2017	3,635	+1.53%
2023	3,939	+1.35%
Source: INSEE

== See also ==
- Communes of the Ille-et-Vilaine department
