= House of Laval =

French noble family

The coat of arms of the Laval; their motto was Eadem mensura (of same measure)

The coat of arms used by Counts of Laval

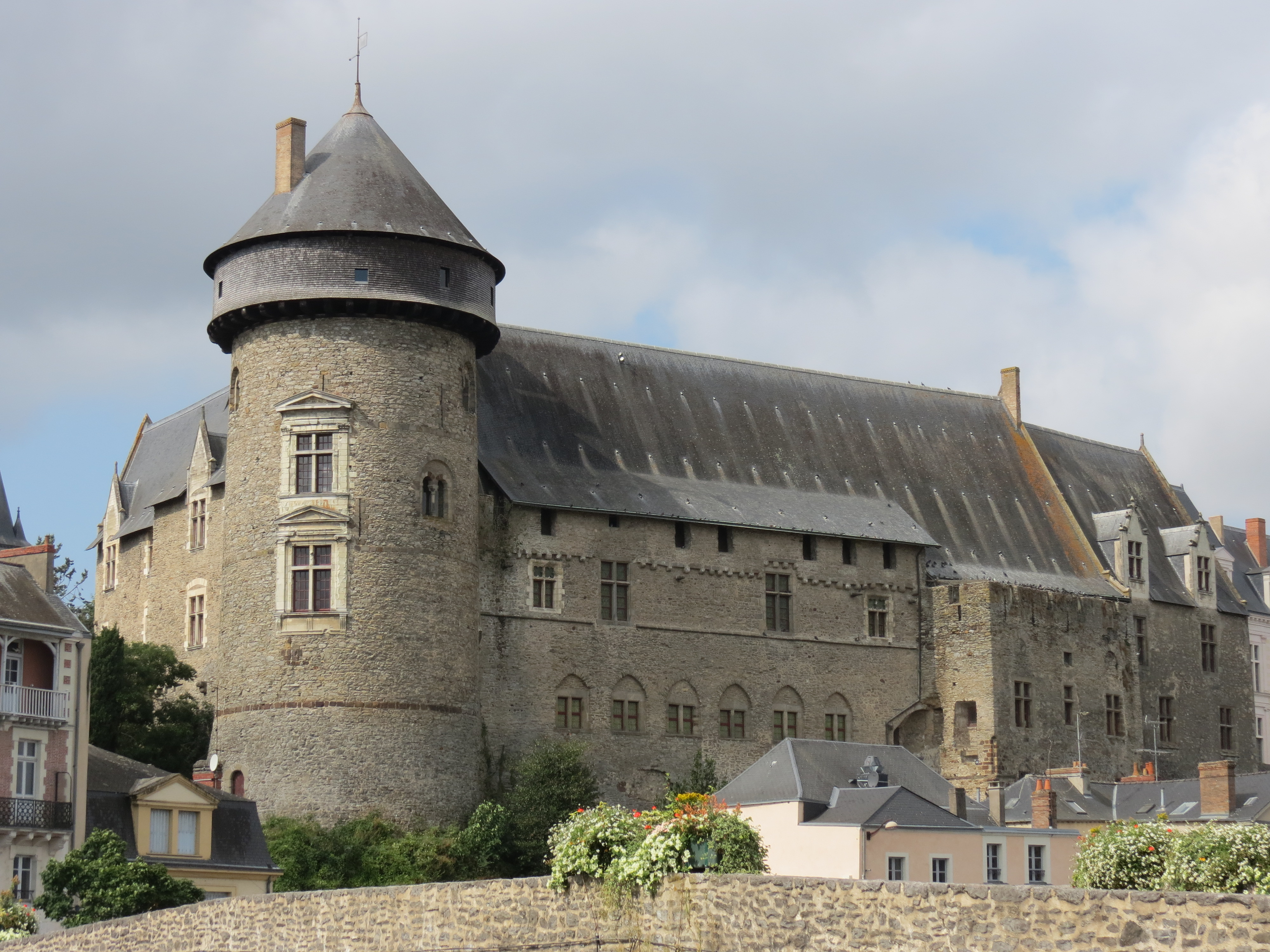
The Laval Castle

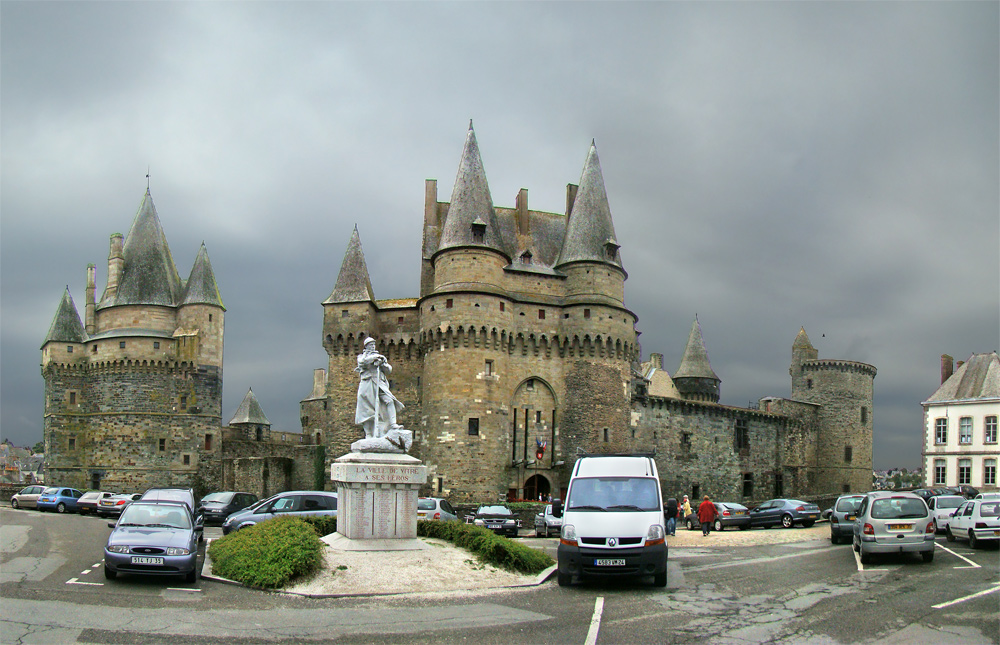
The Château de Vitré, in Brittany

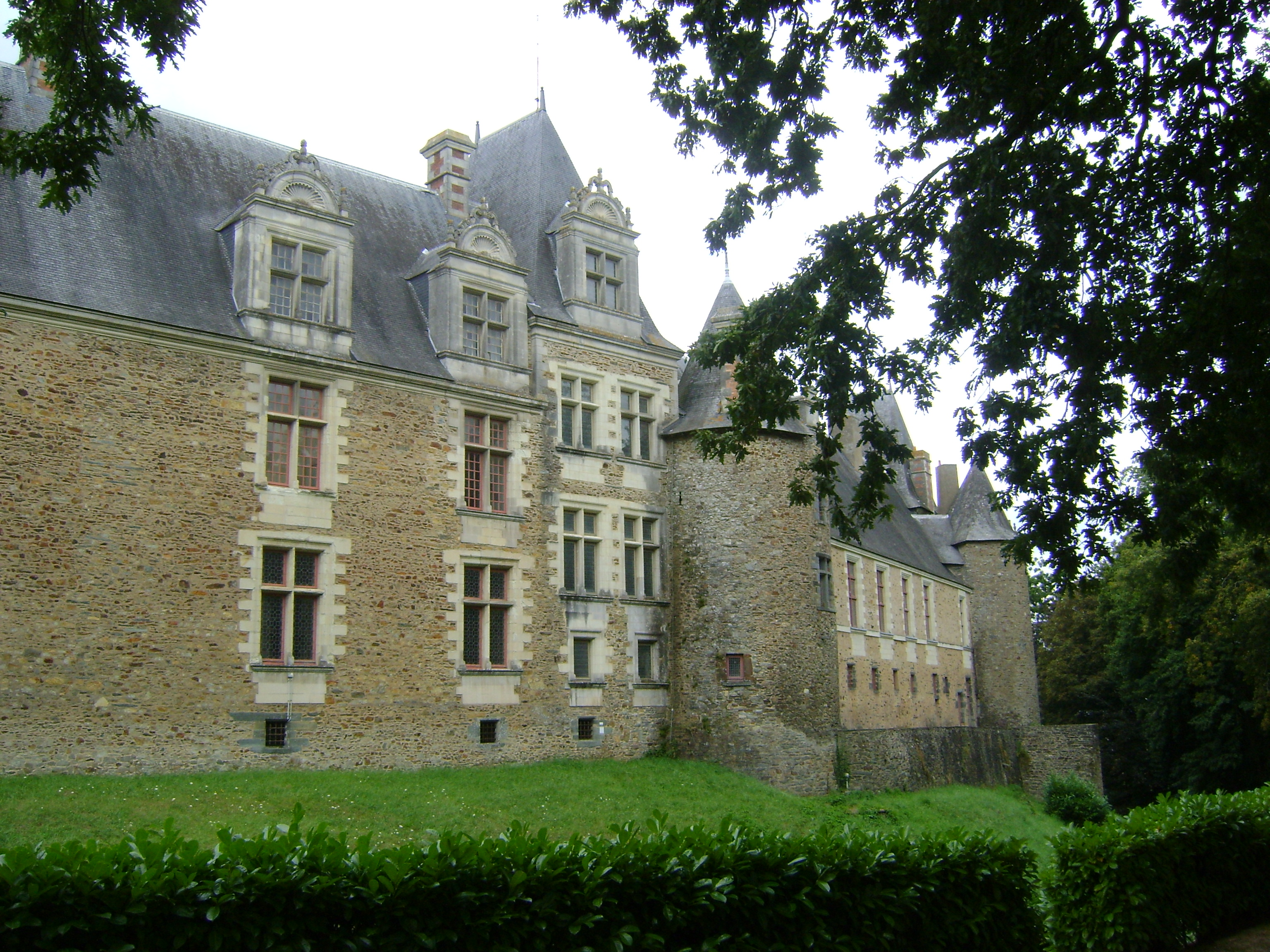
The Renaissance aisle of the château de Châteaubriant

The House of Laval is a family of barons, later counts, coming from the town of Laval, located in Northwestern France, part of the province of Maine before the French Revolution. The Laval were one of the most powerful families of Maine during the Middle Ages and also had a presence in Brittany, where their prestige was similar to that of the Rohan. The House of Laval played a significant role in Breton history and during the Hundred Years War and the French Wars of Religion. They also favored the French Renaissance in Northwestern France, building several châteaux. The last male heir died during the 17th century, and his possessions went to the House of La Trémoille.

François de Laval was the first Roman Catholic bishop of Quebec; the city of Laval, Quebec, and the Université Laval were named after him.

== Branches and titles ==
The House of Laval appeared during the first quarter of the 11th century. Its origins are unclear and the first mentioned baron is Guy I. The direct branch became extinct in the male line in 1211, after the death of Guy VI. His sister, Edme, had previously married Matthieu II de Montmorency with a contract stipulating that her first son should take the Laval surname and arms.

The branch of Montmorency-Laval died out in 1412 with Guy XII. His heiress, Anne, had married Jean de Montfort with a contract similar to Edme's one. Hence, her heirs took the name of Laval.

The branch of Montfort-Laval started with Jean de Montfort, nicknamed Guy XIII of Laval, who died in 1415, and ended with Guy XVII in 1547.

The branch of Rieux-Laval started with Louis de Sainte-Maure, who married the granddaughter of Guy XVI of Laval. This branch ended with Guy XX, killed in Hungary in 1605.

The possessions of Laval passed to the La Trémoille family, who stopped the medieval tradition according which all the counts of Laval had to be called "Guy".

== Line of Descent ==
=== Barons of Laval ===
Previous Generations

- Guy de Laval (Uncertain)
- Guyon de Laval (Uncertain)
- Bernard de Laval (Uncertain)
- Yve de Laval married Havoise (Uncertain)
- Yve de Laval married Havoise de Mathefélon (Uncertain)
- Geoffery de Laval (Uncertain)
- Geoffery de Laval (Uncertain)
- Guy I de Laval Seigneur de Laval married Bertha de Tosny daughter of Raoul I of Tosny
- Hamon de Chateau-du-Loire, Seigneur de Laval, married Hersende
- Guy II de Laval, Seigneur de Laval, married Denise de Mortain
- Guy III de Laval married Emma Guyon
- Guy IV de Laval marred Emma de Dunstanville
- Guy V de Laval (d 1210) married Avoise de Craon and sired
  - Guy VI (d 1211) who died childless
  - Emma (c1200-1264, sister of Guy VI) married Mathieu II de Montmorency and gave birth to
    - Guy VII (d 1267), who married Philippa de Vitre and sired
      - Guy VIII (d 1295), who married Isabelle Beaumont and sired
        - Guy IX (d 1333), who married Beatrix de Gavre and sired
          - Guy X (d 1347), who married Beatrix of Brittany (daughter of Arthur II) and sired
            - Guy XI (d 1348) and
            - Guy XII (d 1412), who married Jeanne de Laval (a second cousin, descended from Guy VIII). His son Guy predeceased him in 1403. The title then passed to
              - Anne (d 1466, daughter of Guy XII), who married Jean de Montfort, making him Guy XIII de Laval. They had several sons, including Guy XIV de Laval

=== Counts of Laval ===
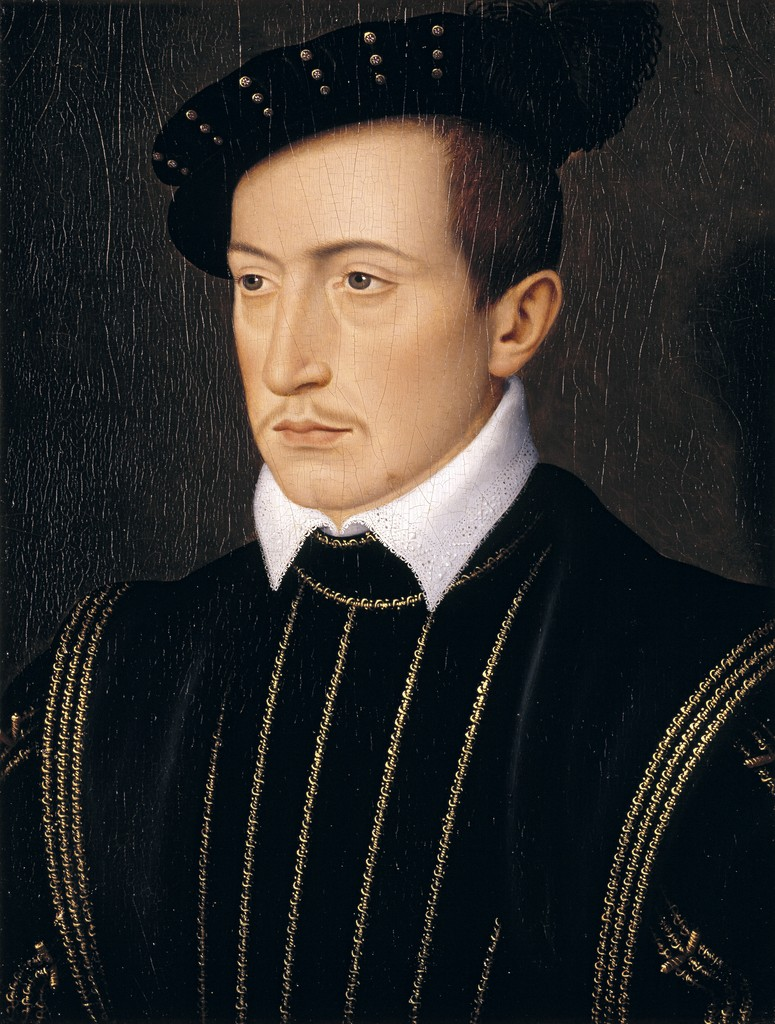
Guy XVII, Comte de Laval (portrait by François Clouet)

- Guy XIV de Laval (d 1486), who married Isabella of Brittany and sired
  - Guy XV (d 1501)
  - Jean de Laval (brother of Guy XV) sired
    - Guy XVI (d 1531), who married Charlotte of Naples and Anne de Montmorency. By Anne, he sired
      - Guy XVII (d 1547)
      - Catherine (daughter of Guy XVI and Charlotte) had 2 daughters:
        - Renee (d 1567), who reigned as Guyonne de Laval (counting as the 18th) and
        - Claude (d 1561), who gave birth to
          - Guy XIX (d 1586), who married Anne d'Alegre and sired
            - Guy XX de Laval (d 1605), who was the last of his line, and the last Count to take the name of Guy.

== Other notable members ==
- Gilles de Montmorency-Laval (c. 1405 – 26 October 1440), better known as Gilles de Rais, companion-in-arms of Joan of Arc
- André de Laval-Montmorency (c. 1408 – 1485), Marshal of France
- Louis de Laval (d. 1489), governor of Dauphiné, Champagne, Touraine and Genoa
- Jeanne de Laval, Queen consort of Naples and Sicily
- Jean de Laval, count of Châteaubriant and Governor of Brittany, who was married to Françoise de Foix
- Anne de Laval (1505–1554), who was a pretender to the throne of Naples and ancestor to kings of France and Belgium
- Henri II de Montmorency (1595–1632), military commander
- Saint-François de Montmorency-Laval, first Bishop of Quebec
- Louis-Joseph de Montmorency-Laval, Bishop of Metz
- Mathieu de Montmorency (1767–1826), statesman during the French Revolution and Bourbon Restoration

== See also ==
- Duke of Brittany
- French nobility
