= French–Breton War =

Military incidents from 1467 to 1491

Franco-Breton Wars
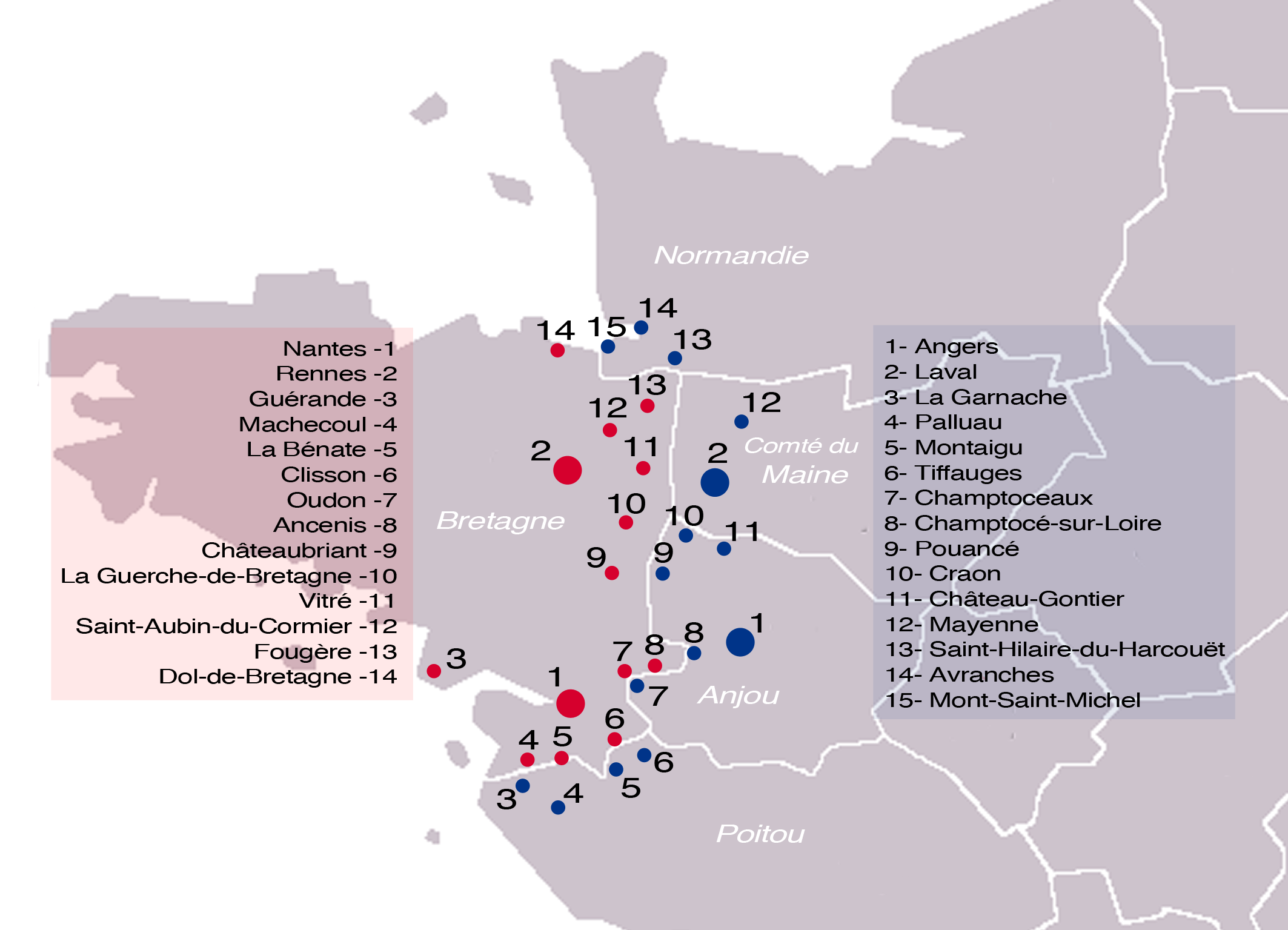
- Fortresses of the Marches of Brittany during the 15th century
Date	1487 – 1491
Location	Duchy of Brittany
Result	French victory

Belligerents
Kingdom of France	Duchy of Brittany; Holy Roman Empire; Kingdom of England; Kingdom of Castile and León

Commanders and leaders
Charles VIII of France; Louis II de la Trémoille	Francis II, Duke of Brittany; Anne of Brittany; Maximilian of Austria; Jean IV de Rieux

The French–Breton War (Breton: Brezel etre Breizh ha Bro-C'hall, "War between Brittany and France"; French: Guerre de Bretagne, "War of Brittany") lasted from 1487 to 1491. The cause of this war was the approaching death of the Breton Duke Francis II of Brittany (died 9 September 1488), who had no clear successor. If not resolved, this meant a resumption of issues from a previous War of the Breton Succession (1341–1364), which had rival claimants allying with England or France, resulting in an ambiguous peace treaty that failed to prevent future succession disputes.

This specific conflict between the Sovereign Duchy of Brittany and the Kingdom of France can be divided into a series of military and diplomatic episodes between 1465 and 1491, until Anne of Brittany married Charles VIII of France and the eventual end of Breton independence.

== Context ==
The first Treaty of Guérande (1365) settled the War of the Breton Succession. For decades, two families, the Blois-Penthièvre and Montfort, contested the succession of the Sovereign Duchy of Brittany. The latter would eventually prevail. The rights of the two families, however, were recognised in the following manner:

- the Duchy was inherited from male to male in the family of Montfort;
- if there was no male descendant in the family of Montfort, the Ducal rights would pass to the males of the family of Penthievre.

This treaty did not exclude daughters from the succession or the transmission of rights, stating that the Duchy "will not return to women as long as there were male heirs".

Both families had over time disrespected the treaty when it suited them; Various Montforts: (John IV, Francis II) while the Penthièvre forfeited their lands in 1420 after they had kidnapped and isolated Duke John V).

At the end of the reign of the current Duke Francis II, the two families had no male heirs: Francis II had two daughters, and the last Penthièvre were women. Therefore, the following claimants existed:

=== Claimants from the House of Montfort ===
- the sisters Anne and Isabeau of Brittany, daughters of the reigning Duke, last heirs of the family and first in the order of succession;
- John de Chalon, Prince of Orange, son of Catherine of Brittany (sister of the Duke Francis II). Closest heir to Francis II after Anne and Isabeau;
- John II, Viscount of Rohan and Léon, husband of Marie of Brittany (daughter of Duke Francis I). Without the Treaty of Guérande, his wife would have become Duchess from 1469, on the death of her older sister Margaret. Jean II proposed to marry his sons Francis and Jean to Anne and her sister Isabella, thereby combining the claims. Francis II refused it against the advice of his council and lineal logic. Later he would style himself as a Duke;
- Francis d'Avaugour, bastard son of Duke Francis II and Antoinette de Maignelais. He renounced before the Estates of Brittany his hypothetical rights.

=== Claimants from the House of Penthièvre ===
The Estates of Brittany, who had no right or power in the succession question, as this had been given to a French King, by a previous Breton Duke, John V, who had paid homage — deprived the Penthièvre of their rights to Ducal succession after their "treachery" in 1420, the year Henry V of England, a supporter of the Montforts, conquered Paris. These rights were to be reviewed by 1447, but the sense of urgency had changed as the French King had recovered Paris (1446) and Normandy (1447) from the English and was now close to the borders of Brittany. After Charles VII crushed the English at Formigny (1450), a previous Duke of Brittany wrote to the Penthievre indicating he had cancelled the conditional renunciation of the Penthièvre to the Ducal estate:

- John II, Count of Penthièvre (son of Nicole de Châtillon and Jean II de Brosse), but his mother had twice renounced her rights (she sold it in 1480 to Louis XI of France, confirmed in 1485);
- Charles VIII, whose father Louis XI bought, on 3 January 1480, the succession rights to the Duchy of Brittany from Nicole de Châtillon, countess of Penthièvre. He was recognised as the heir of Francis II by five Breton rebels in the Treaty of Montargis.
- Alain I of Albret, half-brother of Françoise de Dinan, widower of Françoise de Blois-Bretagne, Countess of Périgord (died in 1481), herself cousin of Nicole de Châtillon, through whom he unsuccessfully claimed the county of Penthièvre. He wanted to marry Anne to his son, John. He did succeed in betrothing Isabeau (younger sister of Anne) to his son, but Isabeau died before the marriage could take place.

=== Increased tensions ===
Some contenders tried to secure support: Charles VIII and John II gained some from different Breton nobility. Various matrimonial projects also aimed to combine the rights of both branches to a single person.

To secure his family against these pretensions, Francis II had his daughters recognized by the Estates of Brittany as heiresses of the Sovereign Duchy, and had Anne crowned Duchess in Rennes, against the provisions of the Treaty of Guérande (1365).

In light of this uncertainty, various parties decided to force the issue to their advantage.

== The four campaigns ==
=== Mad War ===
==== 1487 campaign ====
During the Mad War, at the end of May 1487, nearly 15,000 French troops entered Brittany. The army of the Duke of Brittany was concentrated towards Malestroit and included 600 cavalry and nearly 16,000 infantry, mainly peasants.

The advance of French troops was rapid: Ancenis, Châteaubriant, La Guerche, and Redon fell to the French. Ploërmel attempted to resist, but fell after three days of bombardment and was taken on 1 June 1487. With this bad news, and political infighting between the Breton nobles, the Ducal army broke up. About 4,000 troops remained, unable to rescue Ploërmel. Francis II fled to Vannes, and finally to Nantes.

In Nantes, a defence was organised. By 19 June 1487, French troops laid siege to that city. The siege was prolonged due to an effective Breton defence, the faithfulness of the people, the aid of foreign mercenaries, and the decisive support from Cornouaille and Léon, who broke the blockade. The French troops were held in check, and lifted the siege on 6 August. The French King still managed to take Vitré on 1 September, then Saint-Aubin-du-Cormier and finally Dol-de-Bretagne. Early in 1488, most Breton towns, however, were recovered by the Ducal army. Only Clisson, La Guerche, Dol, Saint-Aubin-du-Cormier, and Vitré remained in the hands of the French.

==== 1488 campaign ====
On 20 January 1488, the Dukes of Orleans and Brittany were declared rebels by the Parlement of Paris. They and their accomplices were no longer considered rebellious vassals, but subjects guilty of high treason. In spring, the Duke of Orleans retook for his Breton ally Vannes, Auray, and Ploërmel. The viscounty of Rohan was forced to capitulate. On 24 April, a French judgment of confiscation was issued against all the goods of Louis of Orleans.

Also in this period of conflict;

For the Bretons:

- Alain of Albret had obtained a subsidy from the Spanish court, and returned to Brittany with 5,000 men.
- Maximilian of Austria sent 1,500 men.
- Lord Scales landed with 700 English archers, all volunteers.

For the French:

- La Trémoille assembled his forces on the borders of the Duchy, while;

Maximilian's attention was however diverted by a rebellion in his territory of Flanders, supported by the French Marshal d'Esquerdes.

In all of this, the various allies of the Duke of Brittany competed for the hand of Anne of Brittany:

- Louis d'Orléans;
- Alain d'Albret, and
- Maximilian of Austria

were all candidates.

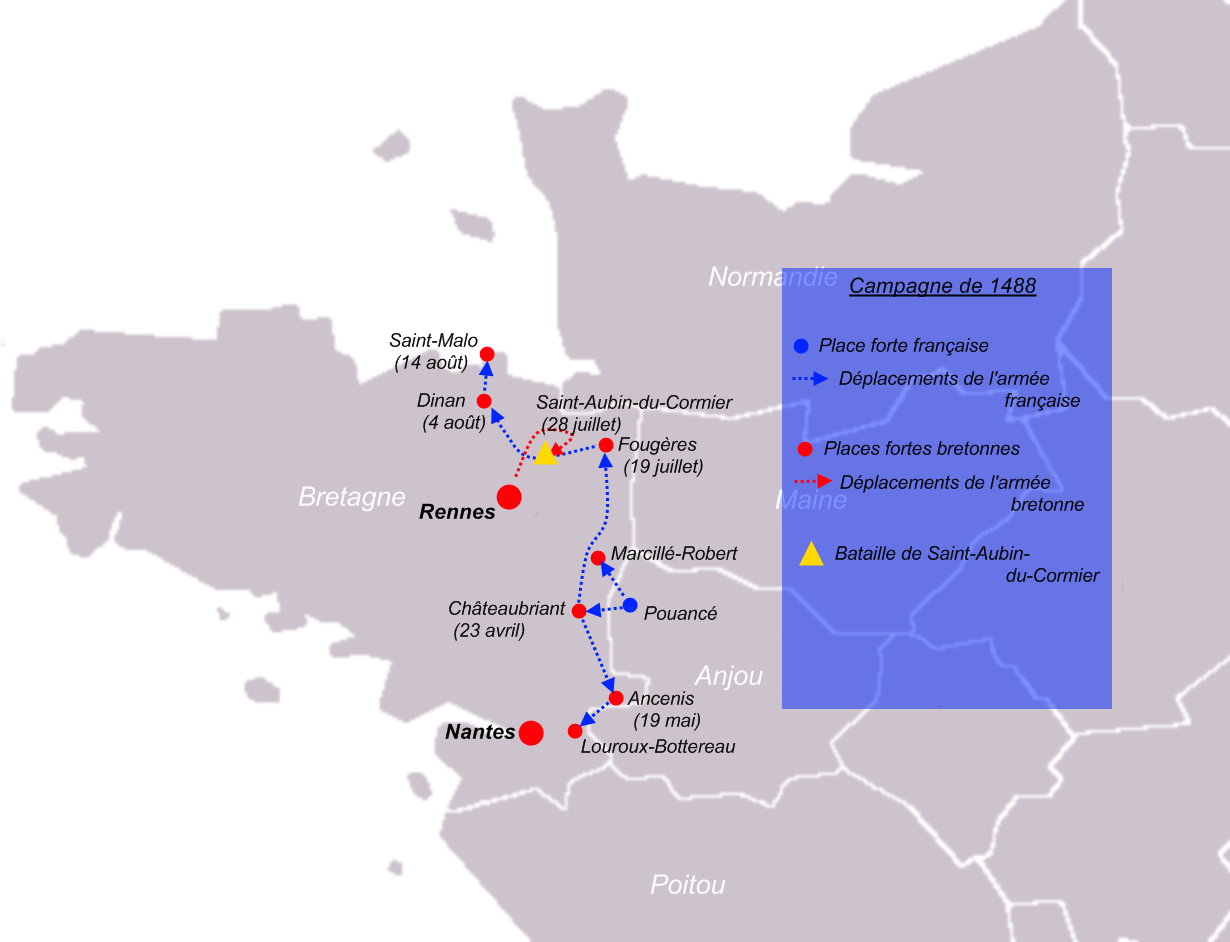
Map of the 1488 campaign.

The war resumed in late March 1488. La Trémoille assembled the French army of 15,000 troops in Pouancé and easily took Château de Marcillé-Robert on 28 March. On 7 April Francis II ordered the muster of Breton troops in Rennes. On 15 April, the French army laid siege to Châteaubriant, which fell eight days later. La Trémoille then moved to Ancenis where he laid siege on the night of the 12th to 13th. The city fell to French artillery on 19 May. As negotiations began with the Duke of Brittany, who sought a truce, La Trémoille attacked Le Loroux-Bottereau, which fell easily.

On 1 June 1488, a truce concluded the negotiations. It favoured the French, whose troops remained mobilised along the border, while Breton nobles and peasants returned home. La Trémoille anticipated the end of the truce, and on 17 June, he put his army on the march towards its next target, Fougères. The breakdown of negotiations on 9 July precipitated a Breton defeat; while the Breton army was still reassembling, the French army laid siege to Fougères. The city was regarded as one of the best defended, guarded by 2,000 to 3,000 men. By mid-July the Breton army was finally assembled, but it was too late to help Fougères, which had capitulated on the 19th, after a week of siege against the blows of powerful French artillery.

The French army then moved on to Dinan, while the Marshal of the Breton army Jean IV de Rieux, began his march in the hope of relieving Fougères, but was reluctant to fight a pitched battle. On 28 July 1488, at the Battle of Saint-Aubin-du-Cormier, the Breton troops and their allies were decisively defeated; more than 5,000 Bretons died, compared to 1,500 of the French. Following this defeat, Dinan surrendered in early August, but Rennes decided to resist. La Trémoille, wished to avoid a lengthy and uncertain siege after the last siege of Nantes, chose to bypass Rennes, and attacked Saint-Malo, which surrendered on 14 August.

On 20 August 1488, peace was concluded in Anjou. The Treaty of Sablé committed the Bretons on several points, including the Duke's promise not to marry his daughters without the consent of the King of France.

Francis II, Duke of Brittany, died on 9 September and Anne of Brittany became Duchess in January the following year. An amnesty was then given to Lescun, Dunois, and most of the vanquished. The French had also captured Louis of Orleans and was imprisoned in a fortress but would be pardoned by Charles VIII three years later.

=== 1489 campaign ===
On 10 February 1489, the Treaty of Redon was signed between the Duchy of Brittany and England:

- King Henry VII would provide 6,000 men from mid-February to November each year, but they had to be maintained at the Duchy's expense.

On 14 February 1489, two pacts, one between the Archduchy of Austria and the Spanish Kingdom of Castile, and the other between Austria and England were also signed in Dordrecht, against France; they were complemented by a 27 March Anglo-Spanish treaty in Medina del Campo.

Within the Duchy however, different ambitions clashed:

- The Marshal of Rieux, as Regent of Brittany and guardian of the young Duchess, was best placed to assemble Breton forces. Alain d'Albret, mainly due to controlling the city of Nantes since 1489, was his ally, and his half-sister Françoise de Dinan, was the governess of Anne of Brittany.
- The Viscount Jean de Rohan (who claimed to inherit the Duchy because of his ancestry and his wife, Marie of Brittany) tried to conquer a part of the Duchy beginning with an assault on Guingamp in November, but the Marshal of Rieux foiled him. He recommenced in January 1489 with his brother Pierre Quintin and French reinforcements, and succeeded, then seized without difficulty Hédé, Montfort, Moncontour, Quintin, Quimper, Lannion, Tréguier, Morlaix, Concarneau, and Brest in February with part of the Ducal fleet. Only Concarneau resisted a siege of 15 days. He then demanded the hand of Anne for his son Jean. But Charles VIII, anxious about his progress, denied him this and forced him to submit.

The Breton Chancellor Philippe de Montauban, Dunois, the Prince of Orange, Raoul de Lornay took the heiress with them, first to Redon, then fled to Nantes, without entering it, the city being held by the Marshal of Rieux. Finally, the Duchess's party took refuge in Rennes, and despite the outrage of the French King on 10 February, Anne was crowned.

The Breton treasury at this point was empty, the revenues of the domain were low: the Ducal jewels and plates had been sold. If this was not enough, loans on cities were forced (Francis II had already used this expedient). The chancellery required advances and loans (the Prince of Orange gave over 200,000 pounds, the Duke of Orleans 45,000). Monetary devaluation, which started in 1472 was exacerbated. Finally, various communities wanted to redeem their imposts (they had paid one time a hundred times the annual amount, and were later released).

Austria and Spain sent mercenaries in March and April (respectively 1,500 and 2,000 men who joined Anne of Brittany) and England (6,000 men sent to Rieux). They were employed to retake Rohan towns in Lower Brittany (Lannion, Tréguier, Morlaix from May to October).

On 3 December 1489, the parties agreed to the Peace of Frankfurt, formally signed by Maximilian of Austria and the King of France on 22 July 1490. France retained Brest, and other places acquired since the Treaty of Sablé: Dinan, Fougères, Saint-Aubin-du-Cormier, and Saint-Malo. Brittany dismissed its mercenaries. Peace lasted for a year, but both sides kept themselves armed.

In the summer of 1490, a peasant revolt broke out: the peasants of Cornouaille, led by John the Old, assembled and plundered the city of Quimper. The revolt was put down by Spanish mercenaries at Pratanros.

On 4 July 1490, the Estates of Brittany met in Vannes. They ratified new imposts and granted new taxes. These additional resources allowed them to pay:

- Jean de Rieux, for retaining powerful forts in Lower Brittany, absolving him of accusations of treason, and received a payment of 100,000 écus, plus 14,000 pension;
- Alain I of Albret, also obtained 100,000 écus, and the hand of Isabeau for his son Gabriel of Avesnes;
- Françoise de Dinan, his half-sister.

These gifts represented four times the annual budget of the Duchy, and were paid in installments.

On 19 December 1490, Anne married Maximilian of Austria in Rennes by proxy. The French regarded this a provocation and violation of the Treaty of Sablé.

=== 1491 campaign ===
On 2 January 1491, Alain d'Albret changed allegiance, signing the Treaty of Moulins with the French King: promising the city of Nantes to him. He seized the castle of Nantes on 19 March. On 4 April, Easter Sunday, the French King entered the city, which offered no resistance, having been evacuated by the Breton Marshal of Rieux. The French army at this stage had a strength of 50,000 troops. Brittany was therefore regarded by the French as conquered:

- French institutions were created in Brittany (administration of finances with Jean François de Cardonne appointed Chief of Finances);
- The Prince of Orange was appointed lieutenant-general.

In July, Rennes was besieged, where Anne's party with 12,000 men resisted, but with few provisions.

By 27 October 1491, Charles VIII convened the Estates of Brittany in Vannes, to counsel Anne in accordance to French conditions. A preliminary interview in Laval requested the following:

- the occupation of the Duchy by the French army;
- the Viscount de Rohan to be appointed as lieutenant-general representing the King in the Duchy (governor);
- any rights to the Duchy must be submitted to a commission of 24 members;
- Anne of Brittany to renounce her proxy marriage to her Austrian husband, Maximilian and;
- Marriage of Anne to the French King.

After the siege of Rennes, marriage with the King of France was accepted on 15 November, by the Treaty of Rennes: it guaranteed 120,000 livres to the Duchess, and 120,000 livres to the Ducal treasury, to pay off the mercenaries to leave the Duchy. The engagement took place on 23 November at Rennes, and the marriage on 6 December at the Château de Langeais.

=== Settlement ===
The conflict was settled by various treaties, by which the King of France obtained the renunciation of the rights of the different possible heirs, and regulated various aspects of the succession, including the payment of debts of the Duchy.

- the marriage contract between Charles VIII and Anne of Brittany:
  - both spouses mutually donated their right of succession to the other;
  - Jean de Chalons, Prince of Orange and cousin of Anne of Brittany, abandoned his rights to the King of France for 100,000 livres;
- Peace of Étaples, signed on 3 November 1492, with the King of England: the two sovereigns agreed on a settlement of the Duchy's debts to the total of 620,000 gold crowns. This agreement freed all towns held as security.
- the Treaty of Barcelona, signed on 19 January 1493, allowed the resolution of the Duchy's debts to the Spanish sovereigns, which also held some rights to the succession.
- Later, Louis XII and Anne of Brittany put the Rohans on trial, thus depriving them of their rights.
- The privileges and rights of Bretons were confirmed (e.g. no new law without the consent of the Estates of Brittany. Appointment of civil officers was reserved only for Bretons or with authorisation, no military service could occur outside Brittany. Bretons could not be tried outside Brittany. Taxes or other compulsory payments would be decided only by the Estates.

=== Aftermath ===
From a political standpoint, Brittany was therefore united to France, definitively according to chroniclers in the reign of Louis XII (only in 1532 according to the Breton writers and modern authors), then annexed and gradually assimilated. It lost its autonomy (under Charles VIII), before retrieving some of it in 1492 and 1499. This was, initially, a purely personal union.

The majority of the nobility of the Duchy and the middle class land owners were generally satisfied with this marriage because peace had returned and the tax burden was greatly reduced. A plot (which included those aggrieved by the settlement occurred: Some officers of the Duchy; captains and citizens hoping for ambitious positions, led by the Viscount of Rohan in collusion with England) in 1492 failed.

The Breton fleet, on the orders of Anne of Brittany, also now fought on the side of the French fleet, as shown in the Battle of Saint-Mathieu in 1512.

== Sources ==
=== Bibliography ===
- René Cintré, Les marches de Bretagne au Moyen Âge, 1992, 242 p.
- Dominique Le Page & Michel Nassiet, L'Union de la Bretagne à la France, édition Skol Vreizh, 2003
