= 1488 =

1488 in various calendars
- Gregorian calendar: 1488; MCDLXXXVIII
- Ab urbe condita: 2241
- Armenian calendar: 937; ԹՎ ՋԼԷ
- Assyrian calendar: 6238
- Balinese saka calendar: 1409–1410
- Bengali calendar: 894–895
- Berber calendar: 2438
- English Regnal year: 3 Hen. 7 – 4 Hen. 7
- Buddhist calendar: 2032
- Burmese calendar: 850
- Byzantine calendar: 6996–6997
- Chinese calendar: 丁未年 (Fire Goat); 4185 or 3978 — to — 戊申年 (Earth Monkey); 4186 or 3979
- Coptic calendar: 1204–1205
- Discordian calendar: 2654
- Ethiopian calendar: 1480–1481
- Hebrew calendar: 5248–5249
- Hindu calendars
- Vikram Samvat: 1544–1545
- Shaka Samvat: 1409–1410
- Kali Yuga: 4588–4589
- Holocene calendar: 11488
- Igbo calendar: 488–489
- Iranian calendar: 866–867
- Islamic calendar: 893–894
- Japanese calendar: Chōkyō 2 (長享２年)
- Javanese calendar: 1404–1405
- Julian calendar: 1488; MCDLXXXVIII
- Korean calendar: 3821
- Minguo calendar: 424 before ROC 民前424年
- Nanakshahi calendar: 20
- Thai solar calendar: 2030–2031
- Tibetan calendar: མེ་མོ་ལུག་ལོ་ (female Fire-Sheep); 1614 or 1233 or 461 — to — ས་ཕོ་སྤྲེ་ལོ་ (male Earth-Monkey); 1615 or 1234 or 462

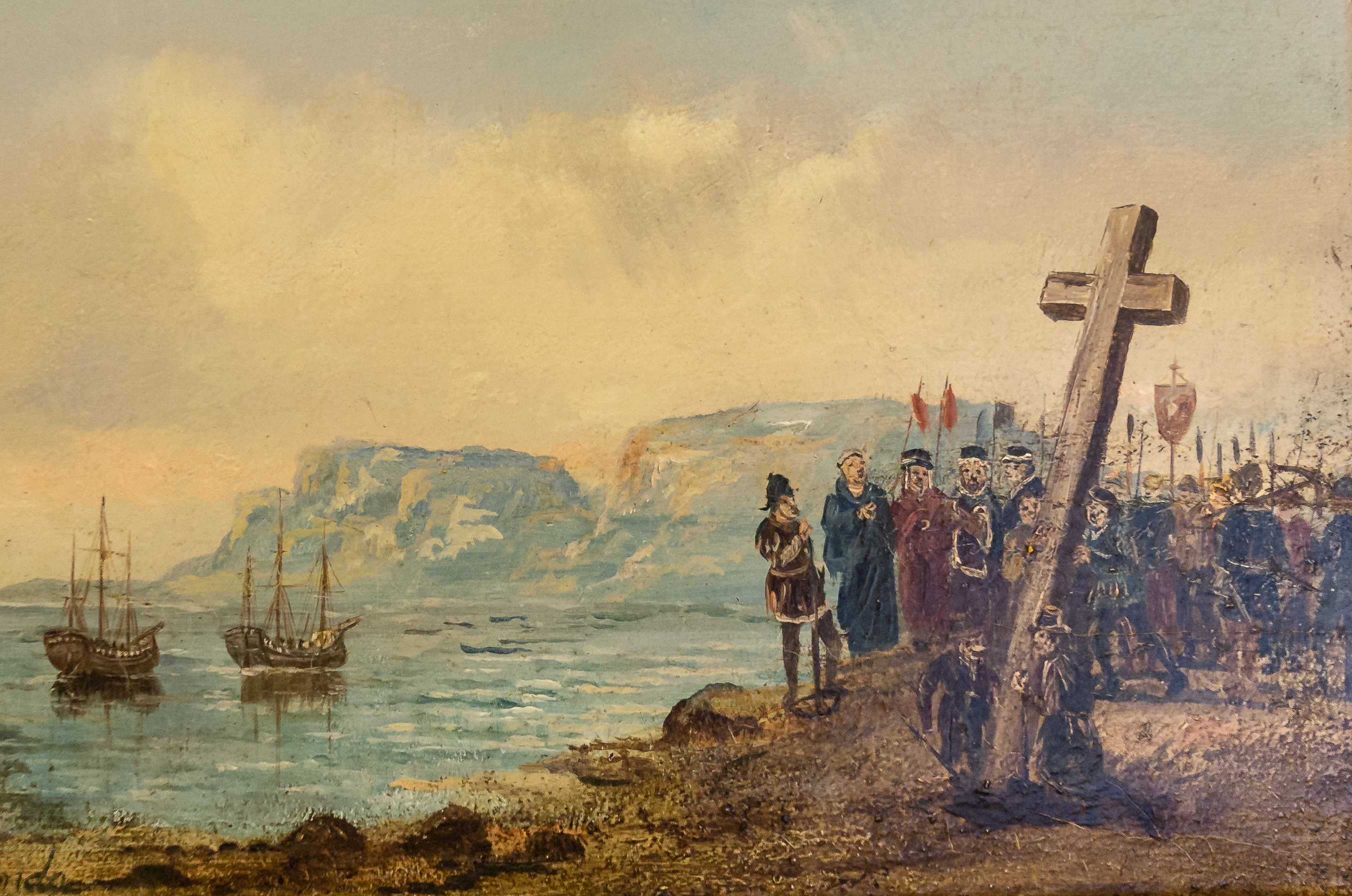
March 12: Bartolomeu Dias and crew become the first Europeans to land at Africa's Cape of Good Hope.

Year 1488 (MCDLXXXVIII) was a leap year starting on Tuesday of the Julian calendar.

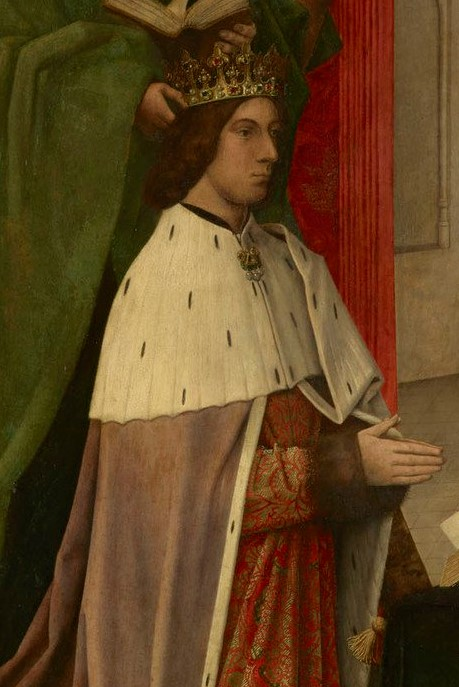
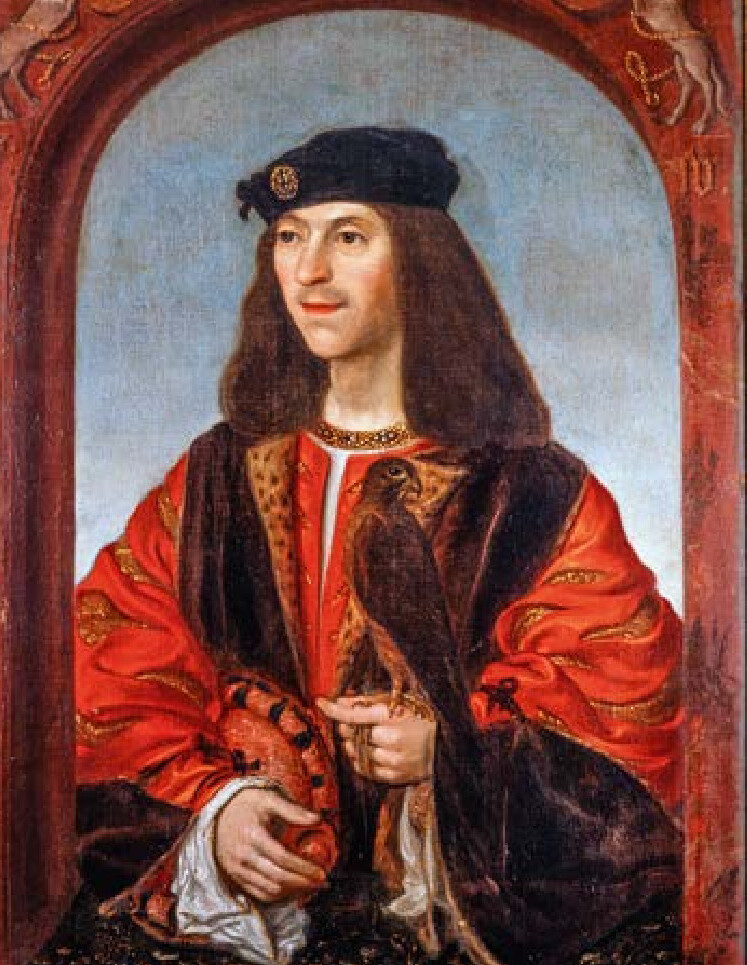
June 11: King James III of Scotland killed in Battle of Sauchieburn against his son, the Duke of Rothesay, who becomes King James IV of Scotland

== Events ==
=== January–March ===
- January 8 – The Royal Netherlands Navy is formed by the Ordinance of Admiralty, issued by Archduke Maximilian of Austria, co-ruler of the Burgundian Netherlands.
- January 20 – In the Kingdom of France, Louis II, Duke of Orleans and François II, Duke of Brittany, are both declared rebels by the Parlement of Paris.
- February 2 – Prince James, Duke of Rothesay, the 15-year-old son of King James III of Scotland and heir to the throne, leaves his residence at Stirling Castle and joins a rebellion against his father. Prince James sides with the Earl of Angus and the Earl of Argyll in the rebellion, which ultimately leads to the King's death.
- February 4 – Bartolomeu Dias of Portugal lands in Mossel Bay after his ships had been blown off course while sailing southeastward along Africa's coast in search of the Cape of Good Hope. After having turned northward, Dias realizes later that he had actually rounded the Cape and seen it from a distance as his ships were sailing westward to reach his prior position.
- February 14 – The Swabian League is re-established at a ceremony in Esslingen am Neckar as a military alliance of the Electorate of the Palatinate, the Duchy of Bavaria, monarchies and archbishoprics in Bayreuth, Hesse, Ansbach, Baden, Tyrol, Württemberg, Mainz and Trier, as well as 22 other "free cities" in the Holy Roman Empire.
- February 15 – The Frari Triptych is completed by Giovanni Bellini, and he marks the date by placing a label on the back of the canvas.
- February 28 – Choe Bu (1454-1504), the Korean Commissioner of Registers for the island of Cheju, shipwrecks on the south east coast of China in Taizhou, Zhejiang.
- March 12 – The Bartolomeu Dias expedition from Portugal arrives at the Cape of Good Hope and the crew of the two expedition ships, São Cristóvão and São Pantaleão, become the first Europeans to set foot at Good Hope. They anchor at the Boesmans River at what is now the South African city of Kwaaihoek. In that the landing took place on the feast day of Saint Gregory, the Portuguese sailors erect the Padrão de São Gregório, a stone pillar and cross, to mark their arrival.
- March 14 – Hadım Ali Pasha, the Ottoman beylerbey of Karaman, recaptures Adana and Tarsus from the Mamluks.
- March 21 – The Treaty of Valencia is signed in Spain between the Kingdom of Navarre and the "Catholic Monarchy" of Aragon and Castile.

=== April–June ===
- April 23 – The Siege of Châteaubriant in the Duchy of Brittany, started by the army of France, ends after eight days. Commanded by Louis II de la Trémoille, the French Army had bombarded the city with cannon fire and forced its surrender.
- April 23 – Konrad the Red of the Piast dynasty inherits the rights to the Duchy of Warsaw upon the death of his older brother, Duke Bolesław V, but the nobles refuse to accept him. Konrad and Bolesław's younger brother Janusz II of Płock become the new rulers. Duke Konrad III the Red's promises to pay homage to John Albert of April 20, 1496.
- April 24 – A judgment of confiscation is declared by a French court against the goods of Prince Louis of Orleans, who had sought to overthrow his cousin, King Charles VIII
- June 11 – King James III of Scotland is killed at the Battle of Sauchieburn, in a rebellion in which his son, James, Duke of Rothesay, is on the other side. Rothesay becomes King James IV and spends the rest of his life regretting his role in his father's death.

=== July–September ===
- July 12 – Joseon Dynasty official Choe Bu returns to Korea, after months of shipwrecked travel in China.
- July 19 – France's siege of Fougères in Brittany, led by General Louis de la Trémoille, ends after seven days with the French capture of the city.
- July 28 – Battle of Saint-Aubin-du-Cormier: Troops loyal to King Charles VIII of France defeat rebel forces, led by the Dukes of Orleans and Brittany, bringing the "Mad War" (la Guerre folle) to an end.
- August 17 – The Mamluk Sultanate defeats the Ottoman Empire Army in the Battle of Aga-Cayiri fought in the Cilicia region of Asia Minor, now in Turkey.
- August 20 – The Treaty of Sablé is signed in Sablé-sur-Sarthe by Francois, Duke of Brittany and Charles VIII, King of France, ending the "Mad War". Under the terms of the treaty, Francois agrees for the Duchy of Brittany to be a vassal of King Charles, and cedes the Duchy's territories of Saint Malo, Dinan, Fougères and Saint-Aubin-du-Cormier to the French crown. Francois also agrees that before arranging his daughter, Anne of Brittany, to be married, he will seek the King's consent. In return, Charles removes the French Army troops from Brittany.
- September 9 – Anne of Brittany becomes Duchess of Brittany at the age of 11. Her marriage to King Charles VIII in 1491 effectively ends Breton independence from France.

=== October–December ===
- October 17 – King James IV of Scotland gives royal assent to numerous laws approved by the Scottish Parliament during its 1488 session, including the France Act ("to renew the confideracioun betuix the realmez of France and Scotland") and the Rebel Officers of Law Act (disbarring and suspending any wardens, justices or other officials "who were in battle at Stirling against our sovereign Lord").
- November 18 – In the "Squire Francis War" (Jonker Fransenoorlog), a new phase of the Dutch civil war in the Burgundian Netherlands county of Holland, the rebel army of the Hook faction, led by Frans van Brederode, captures the city of Rotterdam, capital of Holland.
- December 23 – Isabella of Aragon, daughter of King Alfonso II of Naples, enters a marriage by proxy to Gian Galeazzo Sforza, Duke of Milan.

=== Date unknown ===
- Jasper Tudor, 1st Duke of Bedford, takes possession of Cardiff Castle.
- Michelangelo Buonarroti becomes apprentice to Domenico Ghirlandaio.
- The city of Bikaner in western India is founded by Rao Bika.
- Rathbornes Candles is established in Dublin; the company is still trading in the 21st century.

== Births ==
- January 6 – Helius Eobanus Hessus, German Latin poet (d. 1540)
- January 20
  - John George, Marquis of Montferrat, Italian noble (d. 1533)
  - Sebastian Münster, German scholar, cartographer, and cosmographer (d. 1552)
- March 19 – Johannes Magnus, last Catholic Archbishop of Sweden (d. 1544)
- April 16 – Jungjong of Joseon (d. 1544)
- April 21 – Ulrich von Hutten, German religious reformer (d. 1523)
- May 1 – Sidonie of Bavaria, eldest daughter of Duke Albrecht IV of Bavaria-Munich (d. 1505)
- May 5 – Lê Uy Mục, 8th king of the later Lê dynasty of Vietnam (d. 1509)
- May 7 – John III of the Palatinate, Administrator of the Bishopric of Regensburg (d. 1538)
- June – Heinrich Glarean, Swiss music theorist (d. 1563)
- June 29 – Pedro Pacheco de Villena, Spanish Catholic cardinal (d. 1560)
- July 15 – Juan Álvarez de Toledo, Spanish Catholic cardinal (d. 1557)
- October 17 – Ursula of Brandenburg, Duchess consort of Mecklenburg-Schwerin (d. 1510)
- December 15 – Ferdinand, Duke of Calabria (d. 1550)
- date unknown
  - Rabbi Yosef Karo, Spanish Jewish scholar (d. 1575)
  - Oswald Myconius, Swiss religious reformer (d. 1552)
  - Jan Tarnowski, Polish nobleman (d. 1561)
  - Thomas of Villanova, Spanish bishop (d. 1555)
  - Gustav Trolle, Archbishop of Uppsala (d. 1533)
  - Elisabeth of Nassau-Siegen, German noblewoman (d. 1559)
- probable
  - Thomas Audley, 1st Baron Audley of Walden, Lord Chancellor of England (d. 1544)
  - Guillaume Gouffier, seigneur de Bonnivet, French soldier (d. 1525)
  - Myles Coverdale, English Bible translator (d. 1568)
  - Lütfi Pasha, Ottoman statesman (d. 1564)

== Deaths ==
- April 1 – John II, Duke of Bourbon (b. 1426)
- April 14 – Girolamo Riario, Lord of Imola and Forli (b. 1443)
- May 9 – Frederick I of Liegnitz, Duke of Chojnów and Strzelin from 1453 (b. 1446)
- May 26 – Iizasa Ienao, Japanese swordsman (b. c. 1387)
- June 11 – King James III of Scotland (at the Battle of Sauchieburn; b. c. 1451)
- July 18 – Alvise Cadamosto, Italian explorer (b. 1432)
- July 28 – Edward Woodville, Lord Scales (at the Battle of St. Aubin-du-Cormier; b. c. 1456)
- July 30 – Clarice Orsini, Florentine noblewoman and wife of Lorenzo de’ Medici (b. 1453)
- September – Abu 'Amr 'Uthman, Hafsid caliph of Ifriqiya (b. 1419)
- September – Lasse Huittinen, Finnish thief
- September 9 – Francis II, Duke of Brittany (fell from a horse) (b. 1433)
- September 13 – Charles II, Duke of Bourbon (b. 1434)
- October 11 – Geoffroy Cœur, French nobleman, son of Jacques Cœur
- November 1 – Johannes Crabbe, Flemish abbot and bibliophile
- date unknown
  - Mary Stewart, Countess of Arran (b. 1453)
  - Andrea del Verrocchio, Italian sculptor (b. c. 1435)
  - Borommatrailokkanat, Ayutthaya king (b. 1431)
