= Battle of Saint-Aubin-du-Cormier =

The Battle of Saint-Aubin-du-Cormier may be

- Battle of Saint-Aubin-du-Cormier (1488), during the "Mad War"
- Battle of Saint-Aubin-du-Cormier (1796), during the Chouannerie
