= Princess Odette =

Princess Odette can refer to:

- the principal role in the ballet Swan Lake
- the principal female character in the animated film The Swan Princess
- the principal female character in the animated film Barbie of Swan Lake

== See also ==
- Odette (disambiguation)
