= Odet (disambiguation) =

The Odet is a river in France.

Odet may also refer to:

- Odet d'Aydie (c. 1425–1490), Admiral of France
- Odet de Coligny (1517–1571), French cardinal
- Odet de Foix, Vicomte de Lautrec (1485–1528), Marshal of France
- Odet de Selve (c. 1504-1563), French diplomat
- Odet de Turnèbe (1552–1581), French author
- Odet Philippe (1787–1869), Floridian settler
- Stéphane Odet (born 1976), French footballer

== See also ==
- Odet-Joseph Giry (1699–1761), French clergyman
- Odets
- Odette (disambiguation)
