= Odette =

Odette may refer to:

== Arts and entertainment ==
- Odette (play), an 1881 play by Victorien Sardou
  - Odette (1916 film), an Italian silent drama film based on the Sardou play
  - Odette (1928 film), a German silent drama film based on the Sardou play
  - Odette (1934 film), an Italian drama film based on the Sardou play
- Odette (1950 film), a British war film about Odette Sansom
- Odette, heroine of Tchaikovsky's ballet Swan Lake
- Odette (ballet), an 1847 ballet by Jules Perrot
- Odette, a character in Marcel Proust's Swann's Way, volume 1 of In Search of Lost Time
- Odette, a character in Genshin Impact named after the ballet Swan Lake

== People ==
- Odette (given name), people with the given name Odette
- Odette (musician) (born 1997), British-born Australian musician
- Edmond George Odette (1884–1939), Canadian politician
- Mary Odette, stage name of Marie Odette Goimbault (1901–1987), French-born British actress
- Terrance Odette, Canadian film director and screenwriter
- Yvonne Baseden (1922–2017), Special Operations Executive agent with the field name Odette

== Other uses ==
- List of storms named Odette, tropical cyclones with this name
- Odette (restaurant), a Michelin-starred restaurant in Singapore
- Odette FTP, a file transfer protocol

== See also ==
- Odet (disambiguation)
- Odets (disambiguation)
