= Marianne Loir =

French artist (c. 1715–1769)

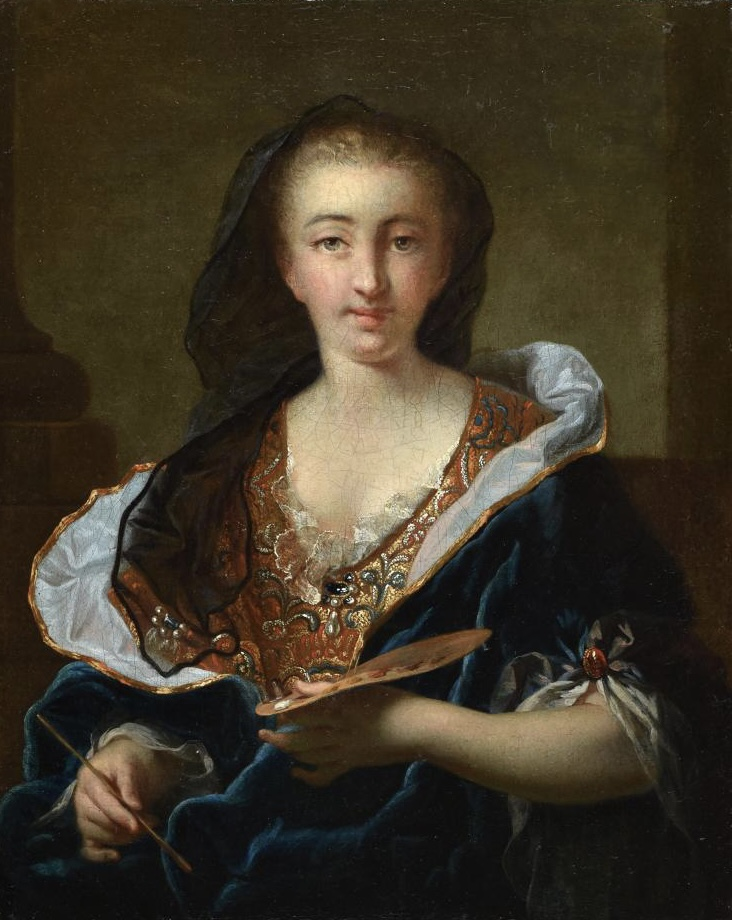
- A presumed self-potrait of Marianne Loir (c.1730)
- Born: 10 December 1705; Paris, France
- Died: 11 May 1783 (aged 77); Paris, France
- Education: French Academy in Rome
- Known for: Portrait painter

Marianne Loir or Marie-Anne Loir (10 December 1705 – 11 May 1783) was a French painter who specialized in portraits.

== Biography ==
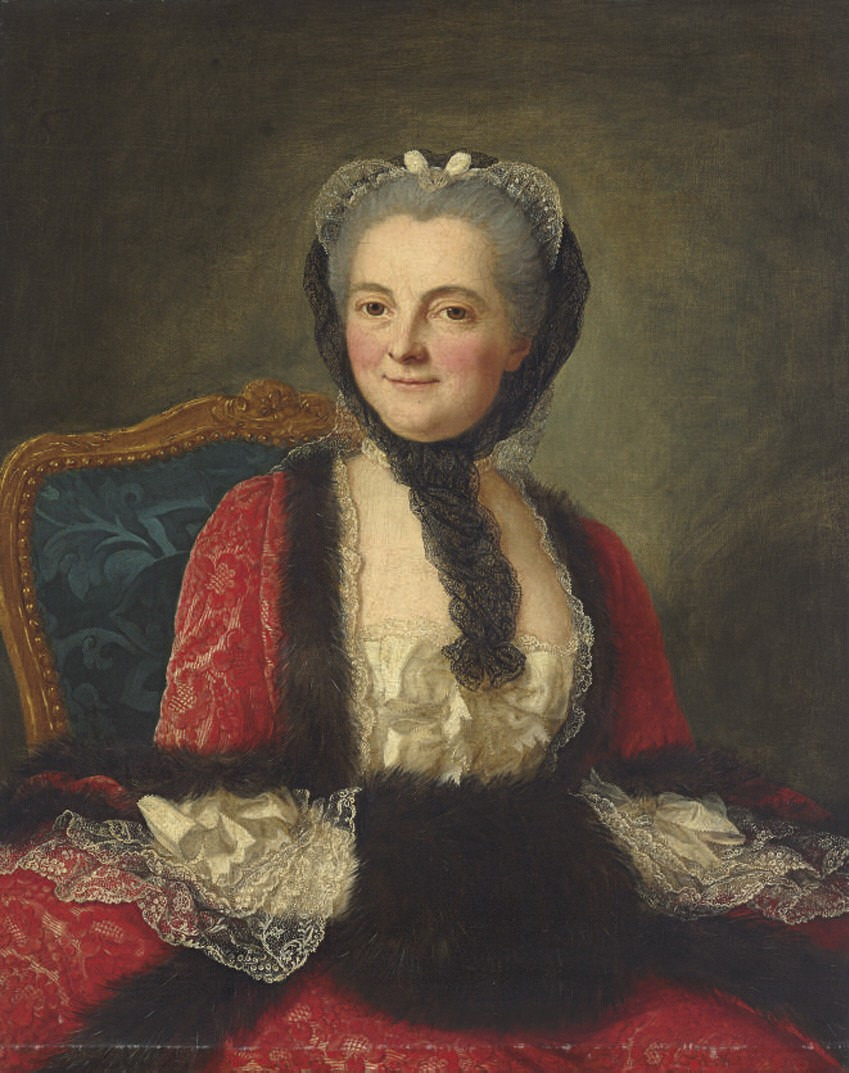
Portrait of a woman in a red dress with a black muff

Marianne Loir was born in Paris, 10 December 1705, daughter of the goldsmith Alexis II Loir and granddaughter of Nicolas Loir. Her brother, Alexis III Loir (1712–1785), was a renowned sculptor.

She studied under Jean François de Troy (1679–1752), director of the French Academy in Rome, where Marianne stayed between 1738 and 1746. She became a member of the Académie des Beaux-Arts in Marseille in 1762, and seems to have stayed at Pau for a time in the 1720s and Toulouse. In 1763 she was in Paris, where she completed a portrait of the young Antoine Duplas on 1 September. She left Paris in 1765 and moved to Provence.

She left ten paintings, signed and dated between 1745 and 1769. She died in Paris on 11 May 1783.

== Works ==
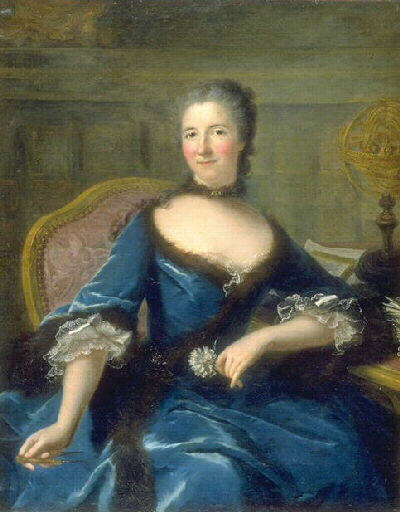
Portrait of Emilie Le Tonnelier de Breteuil, Marquise du Châtelet c. 1748

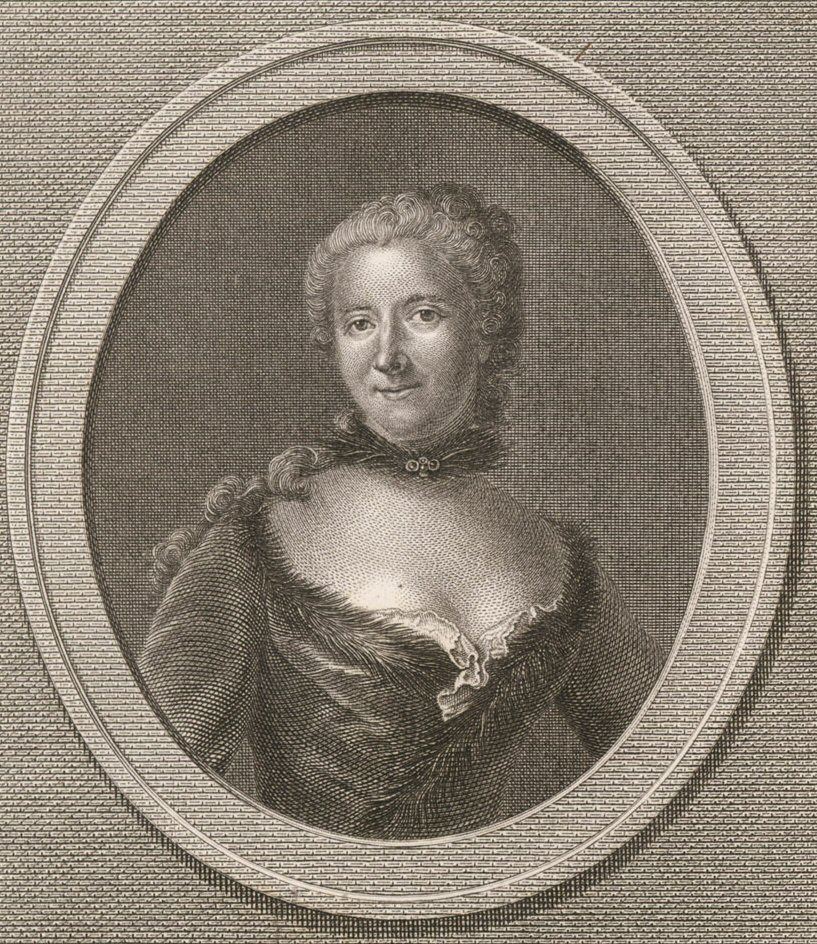
Portrait of Emilie du Châtelet (1706–1749) – print by Rémi-Henri-Joseph Delvaux (c.1748–1823) After Marianne Loir

Works include:

Drawings, watercolors

- N – D – Portrait de jeune femme Dessin, aquarelle, pastel (attribué); Dim; H:54,5 cm X L:44 cm (Vente France, 24 juin 1998)

Paintings

- 1737 – Portrait du Duc de Bourbon HST; S; Dim; H: X L: (notes dans Christine Kaiser; effigie payée entre 1737 et 1738)
- 1740 c Portrait de Gabrielle Emilie Le Tonnelier de Breteuil, Marquise du Châtelet décédée en 1749 HST; Dim; H:118 cm X L:96 cm (Musée des beaux-arts de Bordeaux, attribution en 1803 provient des collections royales française, n°inv: Bx E19 Bx M5848 restauré en 1969 et 1971
- 1740 – Portrait miniature de Emilie du Châtelet collection of Jane Birkenstock, San Jose, California, USA
- 1740 c Portrait de Marie Charles Auguste Grimaldi (1722–1749), Comte de Matignon, frère du Prince de Monaco (Attributed) HST; Dim; H: X L: (Musée de Saint-Lô dans la Manche)
- 1749 – Portrait de Maurice de Saxe HST; Dim; H: 137 cm X L:105 cm (Collection Jacques d'Alençon, inscription on the back of the painting. Collection Baronne Bosmelet née du Trésor, vente anonyme à Galerie Charpentier 6 déc. 1952 (Me Ader) no B Acquis par Mr Huck-Astier dans la famille depuis, vente Robert à Paris le 28 nov. 2008 lot n°16, Robert & Baille, 28 nov. 2008)
- 1750 c Portrait d'un gentilhomme écrivant " HST; (attribué); Dim; H:112cm X L: 86,7cm (Bowes Museum n°accession BM354, Royaume-Uni)
- 1750 c Portrait d'homme HST; Dim; H:80cm X L:64cm (Musée des Beaux-Arts d'Orléans, n°inv: INV976, base Joconde)
- 1760 c Portrait présumé de Madame Geoffrin HST; H: X L: (National Museum of Women in the Arts à Washington DC USA, don de Wallace et Wilhelmina Holladay)
- 1760 c Portrait du Chevalier de Fleury Commandeur de l'Ordre de Malte, commandant de la place de Montlouis à Castries, HST; S; Dim; H:78,5cm X L:63,1cm (classé MH le 5 déc. 2000 au château de Castries)
- 1761 – Portrait d'homme au livre HST; SD au revers de la toile Âgé de 54 ans et peint par Melle Loir en Avril 1761; Dim; H:90,5cm X L:73cm (vente Pescheteau Badin)
- 1763 – Portrait de Antoine Vincent Louis Barbe Duplas âgé de 9 ans peint le 1er sept. 1763, HST; SD; Dim; 75cm X L: 59cm (Musée des Beaux-Arts de Tours n°inv: 52.1.8.)
- 1763 – Portrait présumé de Marion de Mersan « HST; Dim; H: X L: (connu par base Joconde fiche du Portrait d'homme)
- N – D – L'Enfant au râteau HST; S; Dim; H:75 cm X L:59 cm (Musée des Beaux-Arts de Tours)
- N – D – Portrait de J. N. Regnault HST; S; Dim; H: X L: (connu d'après la gravure de François Robert Ingouf, estampe des grands albums de gravures de Philippe d'Orléans conservés au Musée de Versailles)
- N – D – Portrait d'une femme tenant une partition de musique (attribué) HST; Dim; H:80,5 cm X L:64,5 cm (lot n°18 vente France, 28 juin 2007)
- N – D – Portrait présumé de Madame de Séran HST; Dim; H:80 cm X L:64 cm (vente France, lot n°30, Daguerre)
- N – D – Portrait d'un gentilhomme » HST; Dim; H: X L: (vente à Galliera le 3 déc. 1969, n° 68, connu par la fiche du Portrait d'homme de la base Joconde)
- N – D – Portrait de la Comtesse de la Ferrière HST; Dim; H:101cm X L:81cm (Pillet, 5 avril 2009, lot n°50)
- N – D – Bildnis des Gabriel Nicolas Silvain de Montaignac d'Estan – san im alter von zehn jahren HST; S; Dim; H:72,5cm X L: 60cm (Dorotheum, 23 juin 1992)
- N – D – Portrait d'homme assis à son bureau HST; (attribué) Dim; H:81cm X L:65cm (vente Tajan Drouot 12 déc. 2005)
- N – D – Portrait présumé de Monsieur de la Blotterie HST; S; Dim; H:100 cm X L:80cm (exposé par la galerie Frédérick Chanoit à Paris)
- N – D – Portrait d'un homme en robe de bure HST; Dim; H:117cm X L:89cm, (Tajan, 21 juin 2005, lot n°64)
- N – D – Portrait d'un violiste HST; Dim; H: X L: (réplique de l'œuvre de Louis Tocqué Florence Gétreau IRPMF)
- N – D – Portrait d'une femme assise en robe rouge HST; Dim; H:81,3cm X L:66cm (New-York Rockefeller Plaza, vente 2175 le 4 juin 2009)
- N – D – Portrait d'une fillette tenant une guirlande de fleurs " HST; Dim; H: X L: (Tajan 18 mars 2005, Drouot)
- N – D – Portrait de jeune femme en vestale HST; Dim; H:92 cm X L:73,5 cm (Collection Strakovits, Budapest, Hungary)

== Titles, distinctions ==
- 1762 – Member of the Académie des Beaux-Arts de Marseille

== Museums holding her work ==
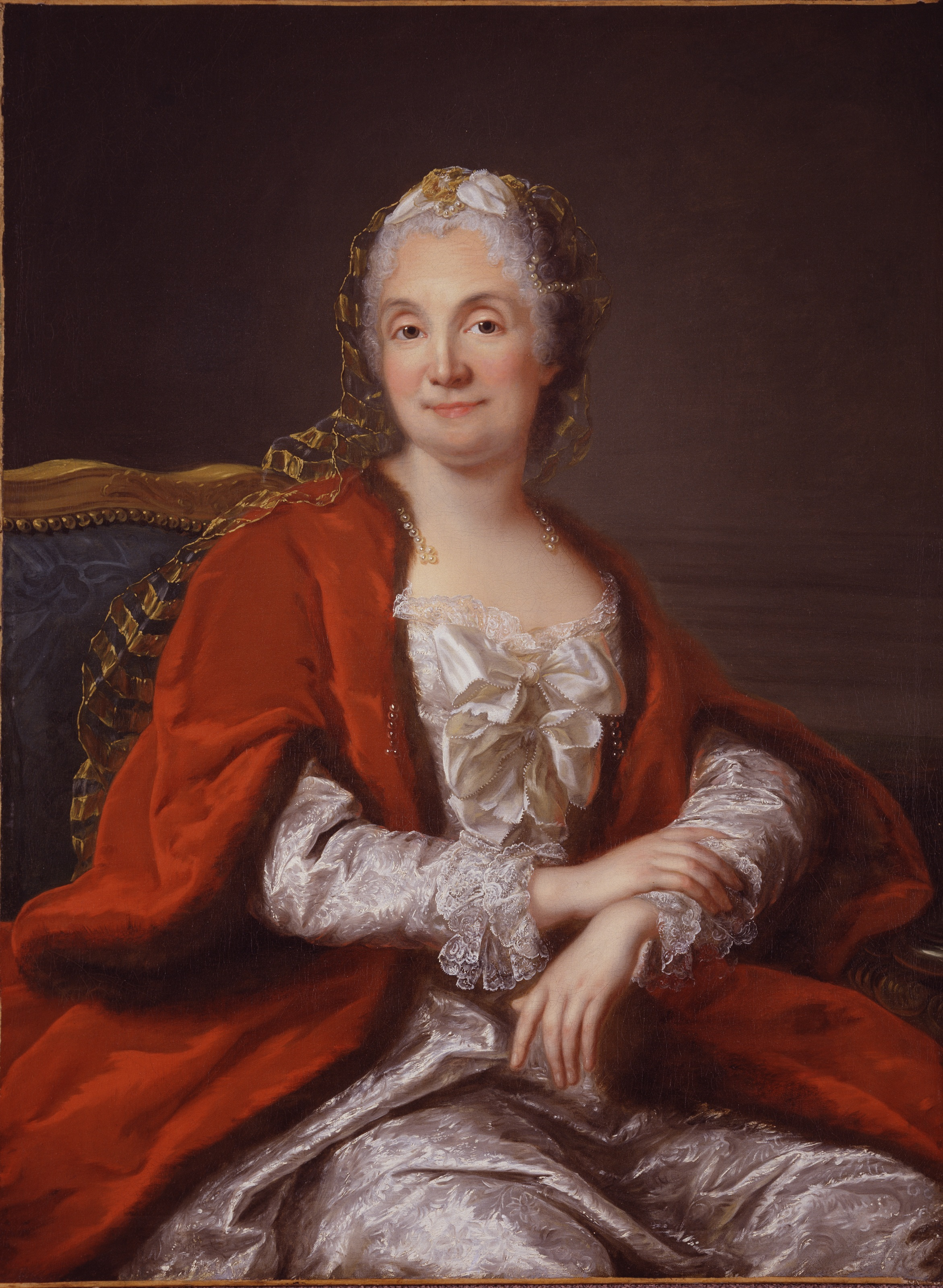
Portrait presumed to be of Mme Geoffrin, salonnière, National Museum of Women in the Arts, Washington, DC

- Musée des Beaux-Arts de Tours, Indre-et-Loire: (Portrait d'Antoine Duplas) – (L'Enfant au râteau )
- Bowes Museum, United Kingdom: (Portrait d'un gentilhomme écrivant )
- National Museum of Women in the Arts, Washington DC, USA: (Portrait présumé de Madame Geoffrin)
- Musée des Beaux-Arts d'Orléans, Loiret: (Portrait d'homme )
- Château de Castries, Hérault: (Portrait du Chevalier de Fleury)
- Musée des Beaux-Arts de Bordeaux, Gironde: (Portrait de Gabrielle Emilie Le Tonnelier de Breteuil, Marquise du Châtelet)
- Collection de Jane Birkenstock, San Jose CA USA: (Miniature de Emilie du Châtelet )
- Musée des Beaux-Arts de Saint-Lô, Manche: (Portrait de Marie Charles Auguste Grimaldi)
- Portland Art Museum, Portland, Oregon, USA: (Portrait of a Man)
- Collection Strakovits, Budapest, Hungary (Portrait de jeune femme en vestale)
