= Battle of Saint-Aubin-du-Cormier (1796) =

Coordinates: 48.2603°N 1.3975°W

- Part of the Chouannerie
Date	June 1796
Location	Saint-Aubin-du-Cormier, France
Result	Chouan victory

Belligerents
(France) Republicans	(Kingdom of France) Chouans

Commanders and leaders
Unknown	Auguste Hay de Bonteville

Strength
500 men (according to the Chouans)	1,000 men

Casualties and losses
90 deaths (according to the Chouans)	2 deaths

The second Battle of Saint-Aubin du Cormier was a conflict between the anti-revolutionary Chouans and the French Republican forces during the Chouannerie. The First Battle of Saint-Aubin-du-Cormier took place in 1488.

A substantial force of 1,000 Chouans under Gustave Hay de Bonteville moved to meet the small Republican force of 500 men, encountering them close to Saint-Aubin-du-Cormier. The Republicans were taken by surprise, losing 90 men killed or injured to the loss of 2 Chouans and 12 injured.
