= Battle of Novara (1513) =

Battle of the War of the League of Cambrai

- Part of the War of the League of Cambrai
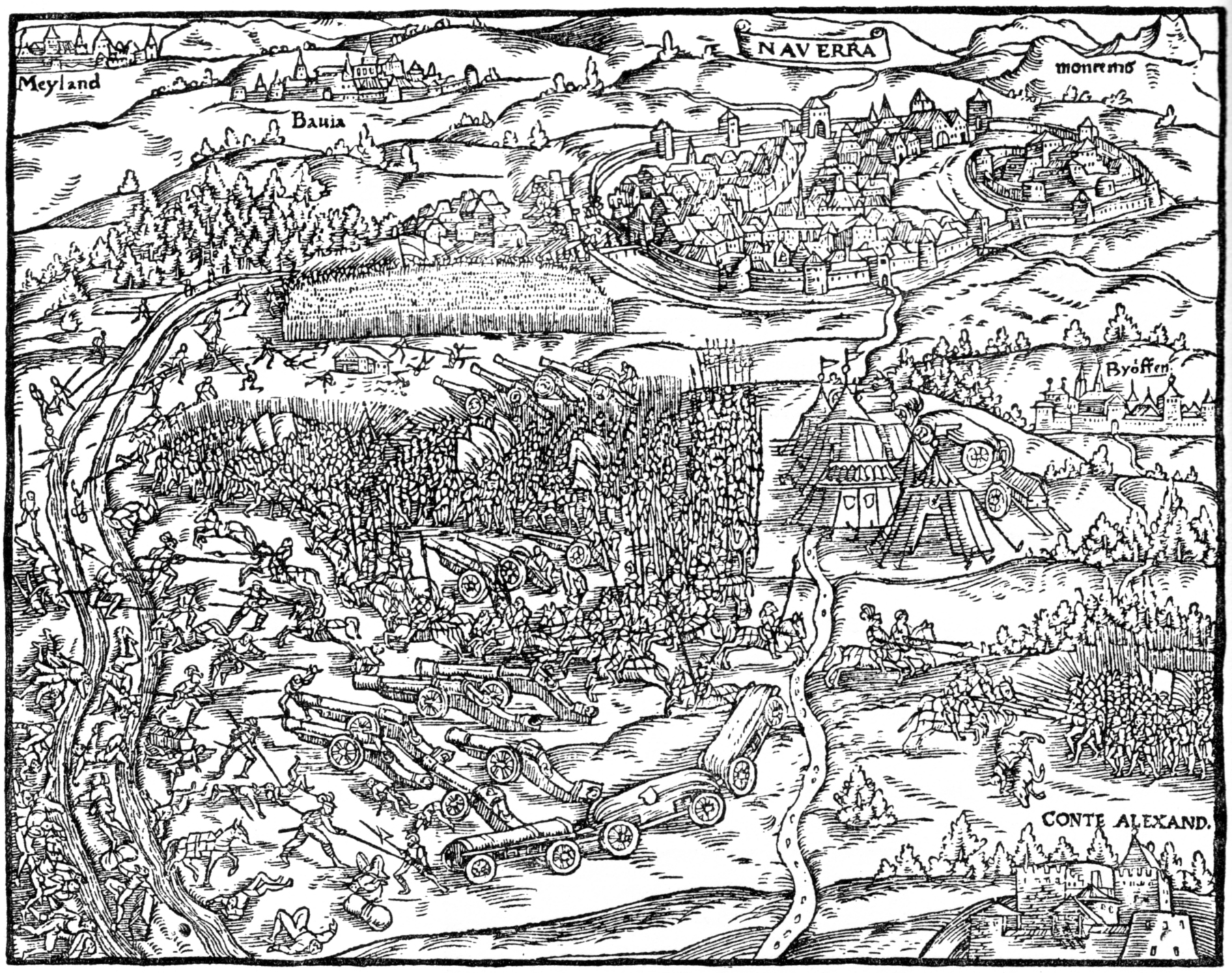
- Illustration of the Battle of Novara in the chronicle of Johannes Stumpf, 1548
Date	6 June 1513
Location	Novara, present-day Italy 45.435°N 8.720°E
Result	Swiss-Milanese victory
Territorial changes	French forces withdraw from the Duchy of Milan

Belligerents
Kingdom of France	Old Swiss Confederacy; Duchy of Milan

Commanders and leaders
Louis de la Trémoille	Maximilian Sforza

Strength
1,200–1,400 cavalry 600 Light horse 20,000 infantry (6,000 Landsknechte)	11,000–20,000 Swiss pikemen

Casualties and losses
5,000+ casualties	1,500 dead

The Battle of Novara (also known as the battle of Ariotta) was a battle of the War of the League of Cambrai fought on 6 June 1513, near Novara, in Northern Italy. A French attacking force was routed by allied Swiss-Milanese troops. As a consequence, France was forced to withdraw entirely from Italy.

== Prelude ==
The French had been victorious at the Battle of Ravenna the previous year. Nevertheless, the French under King Louis XII were driven out of the city of Milan the following month by the Holy League.

Following the French removal from Milan, Swiss mercenaries installed Maximilian Sforza as Duke of Milan on 29 December 1512.

In June 1513, the French army, consisting of more than 20,000 under Louis de la Trémoille, besieged the city of Novara, which was held by Swiss mercenaries.

== Battle ==
By June 1513, most of the western part of the duchy of Milan had been occupied by the French. After marching to Novara the night before, the French were surprised at dawn by a Swiss relief army of some 12,000 troops. The German Landsknechte, pike-armed like the Swiss, were able to form up into heavy squares and offered stiff resistance to the Swiss attack, while the French were able to deploy some of their artillery. Despite this, the Swiss onslaught, sweeping in from multiple directions due to forced marches that achieved encirclement of the French camp, took the French guns, pushed back the Landsknecht infantry regiments, and destroyed the Landsknecht squares. Caught off guard, the French heavy cavalry was unable to properly deploy, fled the field, and left the baggage train to the Swiss.

== Aftermath ==
The battle was particularly bloody, with at least 5,000 casualties on the French side, and 1,500 for the Swiss pikemen, mostly suffered from the French artillery as the Swiss forces moved into the attack. (Note: Seven hundred men were killed in three minutes by heavy artillery fire.) Additionally, after the battle, the Swiss executed the hundreds of German Landsknecht mercenaries they had captured who had fought for the French. Having routed the French army, the Swiss were unable to launch a close pursuit because of their lack of cavalry, several contingents of Swiss mercenaries did follow the French withdrawal to Dijon before the French paid them off to leave France. The Swiss captured 22 French guns.

The French defeat forced Louis XII to withdraw from Milan and Italy.

== Bibliography ==
- Delbrück, Hans (1990). The Dawn of Modern Warfare. University of Nebraska Press. p. 78. ISBN 0803265867.
- Gagné, John (2021). Milan Undone: Contested Sovereignties in the Italian Wars. Harvard University Press.
- Mallett, Michael; Shaw, Christine (2012). The Italian Wars, 1494–1559. Pearson Education Limited.
- Nolan, Cathal J., ed. (2006). "Battle of Novara". The Age of Wars of Religion, 1000–1650: An Encyclopedia of Global Warfare and Civilization. Vol. 2. Greenwood Press.
- O'Connell, Robert L. (1989). Of Arms and Men: A History of War, Weapons, and Aggression. Oxford University Press.
- Taylor, Frederick Lewis (1921). The Art of War in Italy 1494–1529. Cambridge University Press.
- Tucker, Spencer C., ed. (2010). A Global Chronology of Conflict: From the Ancient World to the Modern Middle East. Vol. II. ABC-CLIO.
