= Clément Belle =

French painter

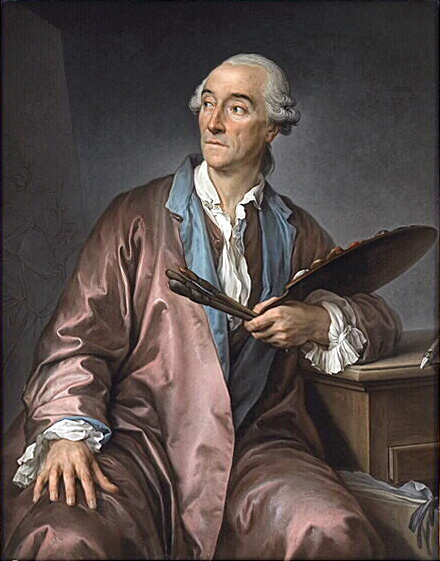
Portrait in pastel of Clément Belle by Alexis III Loir

Clément Louis Marie Anne Belle (16 November 1722 in Paris – 29 September 1806 in Paris) was a French painter and tapestry designer.

== Life and work ==
He was the son of Alexis Simon Belle, a well-known portrait painter and a Member of the Royal Academy of Painting and Sculpture in Paris and his wife, the painter and engraver Marie-Nicole Horthemels. Clément too showed a talent for art and was taught by his mother.

In 1745 he went to Italy, where he spent 10 years studying the old masters and on his return to Paris was accepted into the Academy. In 1765 he was appointed Deputy Professor and then Professor. In 1785 he was appointed Deputy Rector and then Rector.

In 1755 he was appointed head of the art section at the Gobelins Manufactory, an historic tapestry producer in Paris. Although he held the post for 30 years it did not prevent him creating paintings of his own. At some point between 1791 and 1793, the three painters (Belle, Pierre Peyron and Joseph-Laurent Malaine) who worked at the Gobelins were dismissed.

He died in 1806. His son Augustin-Louis Belle succeeded him to his position at Gobelins.

== Selected works ==
- Le Christ en Croix avec la Vierge et saint Jean, 1762, oil on canvas, 292 x 195 cm, Musée des beaux-arts de Dijon, Dijon.
- Le Retour de l'enfant prodigue, musée Magnin, Dijon.
- Minerve remet à Hercule le decret qui a aboli les vices de l'ancien gouvernement, c.1790, oil on canvas, 36 x 39 cm, inventory no. INV 20297 A Louvre Museum Joconde website
- La France recoit de Minerve le code de lois republicaines, c.1790, oil on canvas, 26 x 23 cm, inventory no. INV 20296 A Louvre Museum Joconde website
- La Convention nationale décrète l'abolition de la monarchie (entre 1788 et 1794), oil on canvas, Musée de la Révolution française, Vizille
- La Convention nationale remet à la France le code des Lois républicaines (entre 1788 et 1794), oil on canvas, Musée de la Révolution française, Vizille

== Selected paintings ==
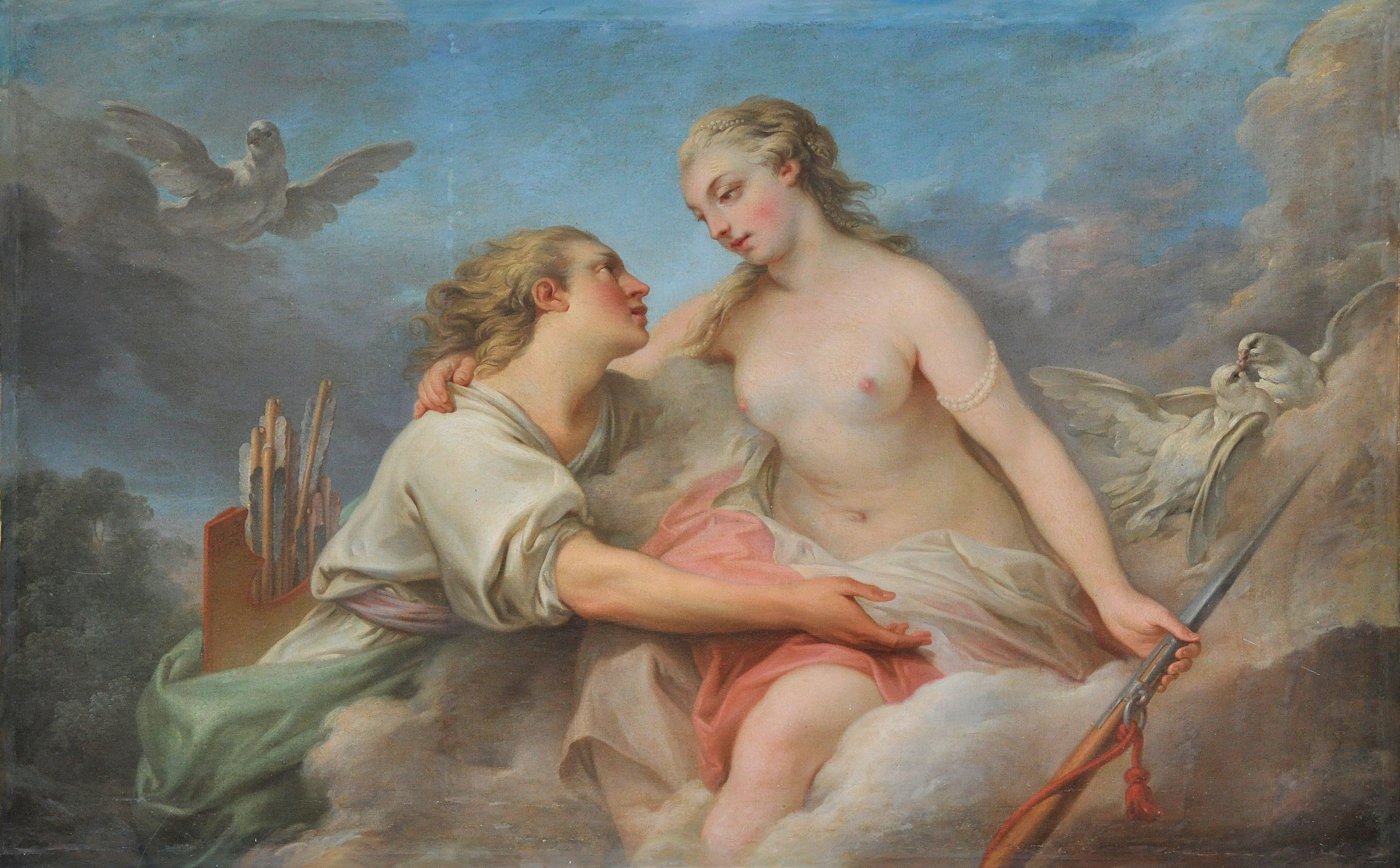
Venus and Adonis, 1772

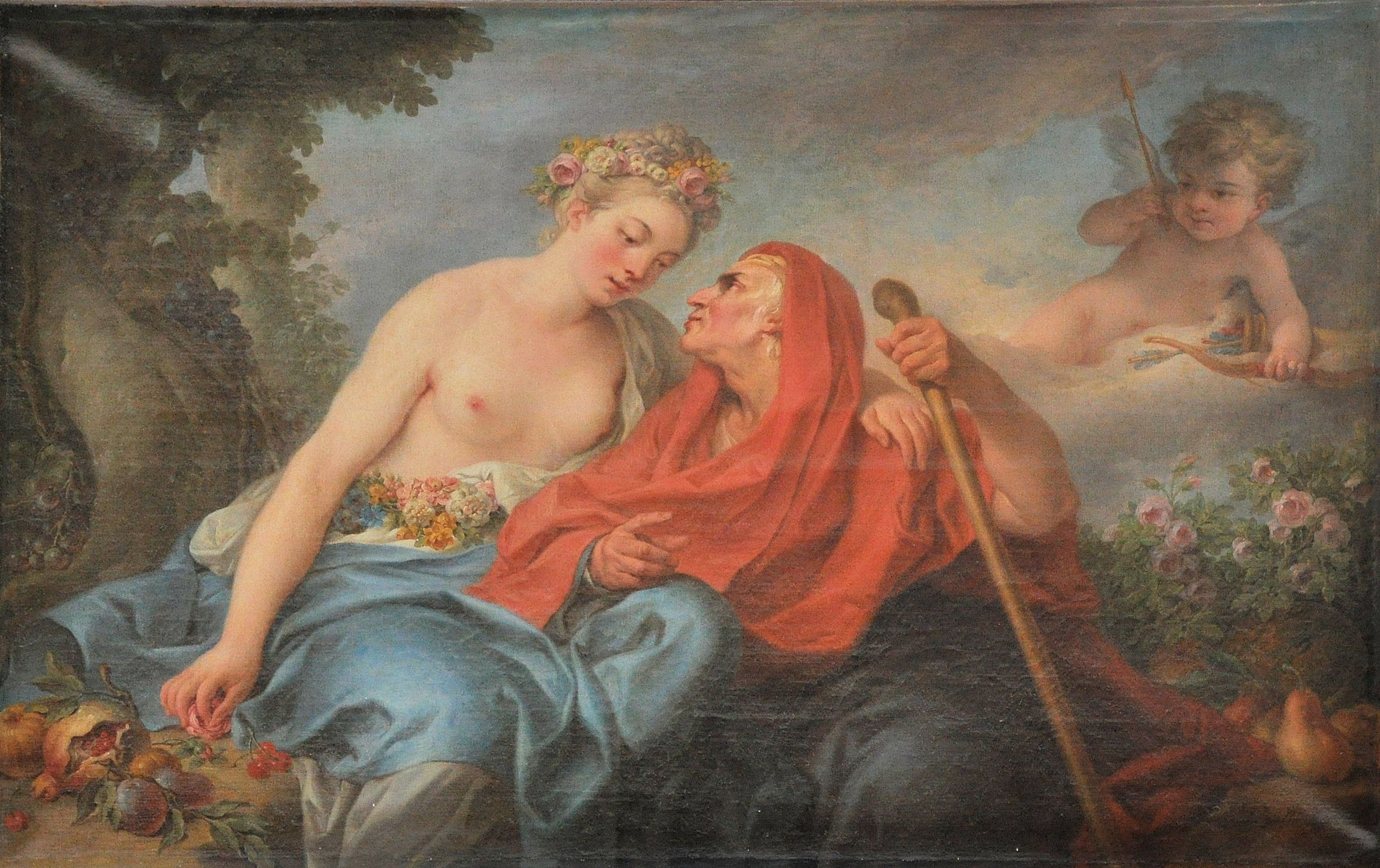
Vertumnus and Pomona, 1772

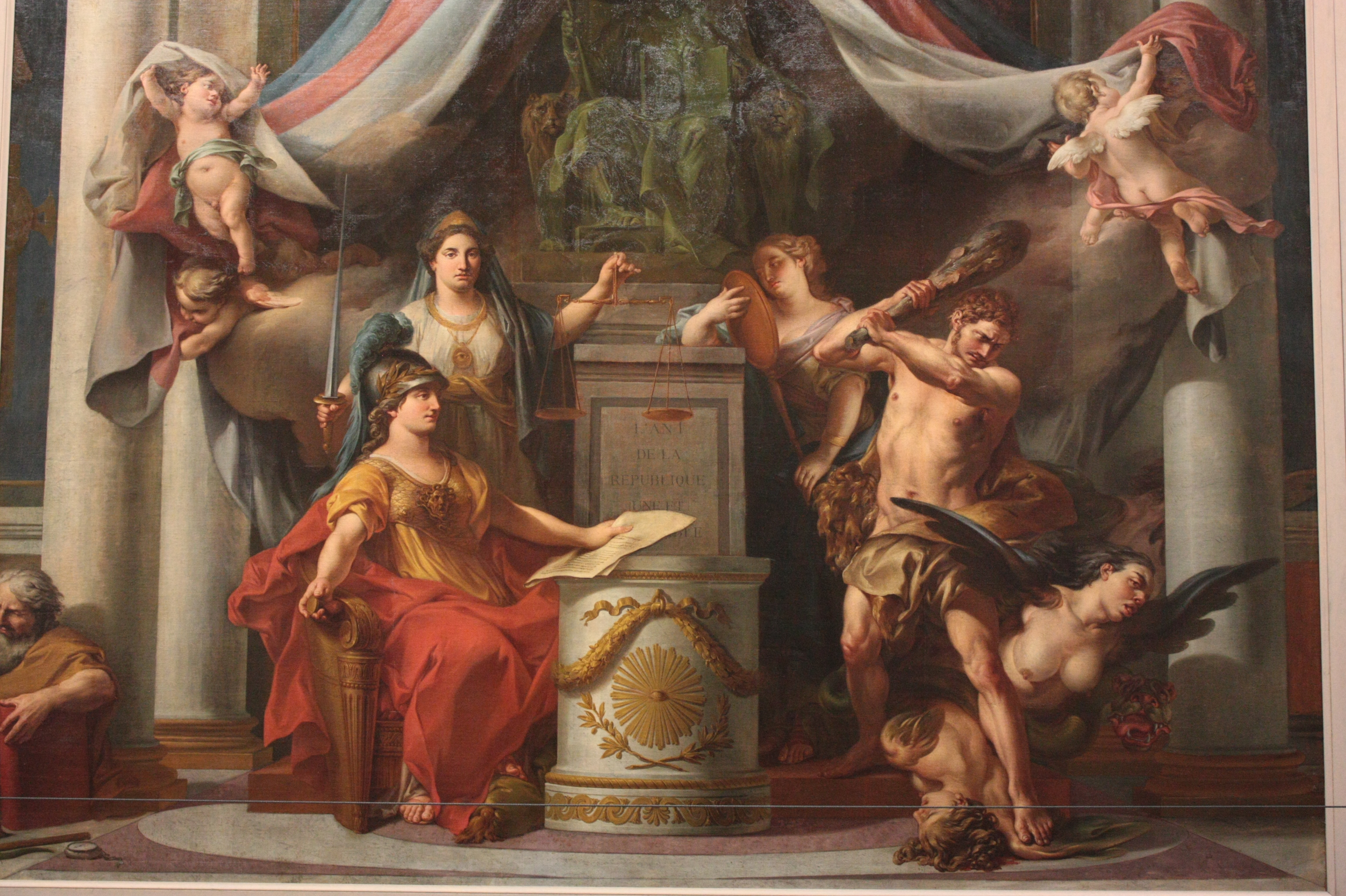
Minerva gives to Hercules the decree which abolished the vices of the former government

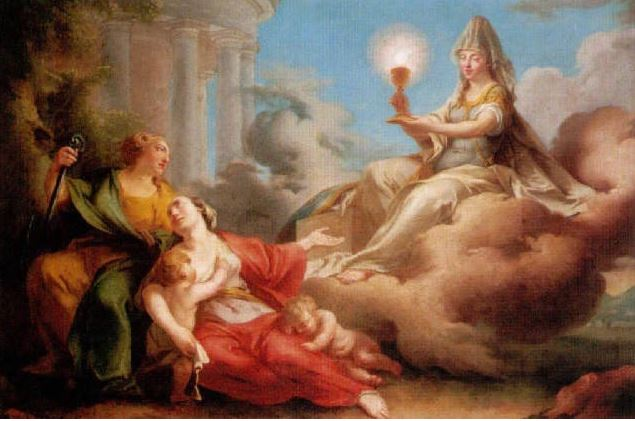
Faith, Hope and Charity
