= Augustin-Louis Belle =

French painter (1757–1841)

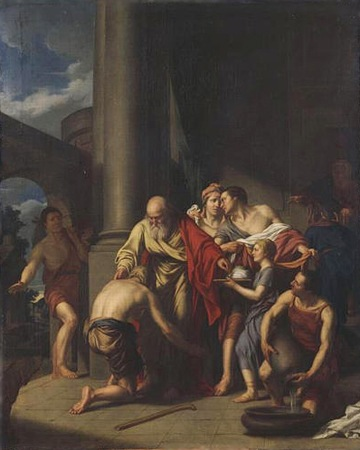
Parable of the Prodigal Son

Augustin-Louis Belle (1757 – 12 January 1841) was a French history painter in the Classical style. He also created some portraits.

== Family ==
He was born in Paris. He came from a long line of painters; including his father Clément Belle, grandfather Alexis Simon Belle and great-grandfather, Jean-Baptiste Belle (before 1642–1703).

== Rome ==
He was awarded second prize in the Prix de Rome of 1783 for his Parable of the Prodigal Son. However, after he went to Rome, he was unable to enter the Academy of France due to lack of space. It was not until 1785 that he was given room and board, courtesy of his relative, the engraver Charles-Nicolas Cochin, who exerted his influence to get him in. At the time, this was kept secret. For some unknown reason, his lodgings were searched during the affair involving Count Cagliostro. He left Rome shortly thereafter, in 1790.

While there, he sent home only one painting, Tobias Giving Sight to His Father (1788).

== Return to France ==
Upon returning to France, he exhibited the "Marriage of Ruth and Boaz" in 1791. He was appointed director of the Gobelins Manufactory in 1793. As one of his first acts, he gathered together tapestries that contained Royal coats-of-arms and other symbols of the Monarchy and burned them at the Liberty Tree, in what he considered to be a show of support for the Revolution. He was also able to negotiate and come to terms with the workers at the Manufactory who had gone on strike to protest being paid in assignats.

When the position of Director was abolished, he resumed painting; specializing in subjects from antiquity. In 1806, he became Chief Inspector at the Manufactory, succeeding his father, who had held the position since 1755. He remained there for only ten years, however, resigning in 1816 during the early years of the Bourbon Restoration. After that time, he apparently retired from painting. He died in Paris in 1841.

== References and sources ==
- Anatole de Montaiglon, Jules Guiffrey, Correspondance des directeurs de L’Académie de France à Rome avec les surintendants des bâtiments: publiée d’après les manuscrits des Archives nationales sous le patronage de la direction des Beaux-Arts, Jean Schemit, 1906
