= Battle of Guinegate =

Battle of Guinegate may refer to:

- Battle of Guinegate (1479), part of the War of the Burgundian Succession
- Battle of Guinegate (1513), the Battle of the Spurs, part of the War of the League of Cambrai
