= Mad War =

Civil war in France (1485–1488)

- Part of the Anglo-French Wars
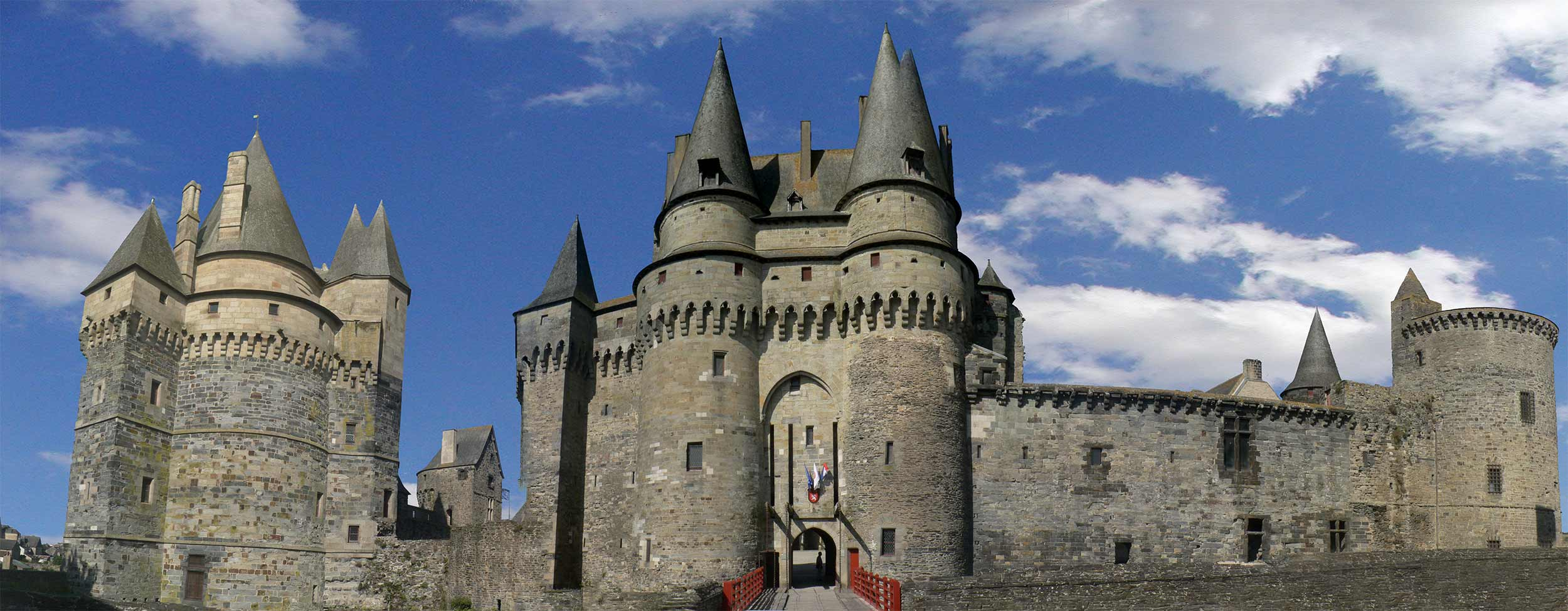
- The Château de Vitré, one of the main fortifications on the Franco-Breton border.
Date	1485–1488
Location	France
Result	Royal victory

Belligerents
France	Rebellious nobles Lorraine Brittany: Albret; Orange: Angoulême; Supported by: Holy Roman Empire; England; Castile

Commanders and leaders
Charles VIII of France; Anne of France; Louis II de la Trémoille	René II, Duke of Lorraine; Francis II, Duke of Brittany; Jean IV de Rieux; Louis II, Duke of Orléans; Charles, Count of Angoulême; Odet d'Aydie; John IV of Orange; Alain d'Albret

The Mad War (French: la Guerre folle) was a late medieval conflict between a coalition of feudal lords and the French monarchy. It occurred during the regency of Anne of Beaujeu in the period after the death of Louis XI and before the majority of Charles VIII. The war began in 1485 and ended in 1488.

The principal lords involved were Louis II of Orléans, the cousin of the King (and future Louis XII of France); Francis II of Brittany; René II, Duke of Lorraine; Alain d'Albret; Jean de Châlon, Prince of Orange; and Charles, Count of Angoulême. Other leading lords supported the revolt, including Philippe de Commines and Odet d'Aydie, Count of Commines and Governor of Guyenne.

As a revolt against French royal authority, it was supported by the foreign enemies of the King of France: England, Spain, and Austria. Its principal outcome was the absorption of Brittany into the French kingdom.

== Name and extent ==
The derogatory expression "Mad War" to designate this struggle of major feudal lords against central royal power was coined by Paul Emile in his Histoire des faicts, gestes et conquestes des roys de France, published in 1581.

There is some dispute about the extent to which the events can be defined as a single war. It followed a long succession of conflicts between royalty and the great lords of the kingdom in the second half of the 15th century, subsequent to the formation of the League of the Public Weal. As part of these power struggles, in 1484–1485, Louis II of Orléans, supported by Francis II of Brittany and a certain number of lords, attempted to depose the regent, Anne de Beaujeu. Mostly by a mixture of diplomacy and shows of force, Anne succeeded in breaking the revolt without a major battle. On 2 November 1485, the Peace of Bourges suspended the hostilities.

According to some historians, this ended the first phase of the Mad War. The second phase of the conflict, from June 1486 to November 1488, is sometimes called the "War of Brittany". Other commentators, mainly Breton nationalists, distinguish this second phase from the first, making it into a Franco-Breton war, or even a Breton war of independence, sometimes by connecting it to the earlier Breton War of Succession.

== Development ==
The pattern of royal lands, duchies, and lordly domains in 1477, shortly before the Guerre folle

At the beginning of the reign of Charles VIII, Louis II of Orléans tried to seize the regency but was rejected by the States General of Tours (15 January to 11 March 1484). In April, Louis left for Brittany to join Duke Francis II; he also sent a request to the pope to annul his marriage, so that he would be free to marry Anne of Brittany, Francis's heir. On 23 November 1484, he signed a treaty which envisaged his marriage with Anne. Returning to the royal court, Louis tried to take the King into his custody, but Anne de Beaujeu prevented him by force. She stopped some lords of the royal guard and placed the Duke of Orléans under house arrest at Gien.

Louis of Orléans escaped from Gien on 17 January 1485 and tried to invest Paris, but failed. He managed to escape on 3 February to Alençon, and made amende honorable on 12 March. Royal troops placed around Évreux prevented him from joining Brittany, and he was locked up in Orléans. At the same time, the roused Breton nobility was brought back to order by the royal troops.

On 30 August, Louis of Orléans issued a proclamation against the regency. The royal army marched to Orléans, but Louis escaped to Beaugency, whence he was dislodged by the young Louis II de La Trémoille in September. On 9 August, Francis II of Brittany agreed to a year-long truce. Known as the "Peace of Bourges", the truce was signed on 2 November 1485.

== Renewed hostilities ==
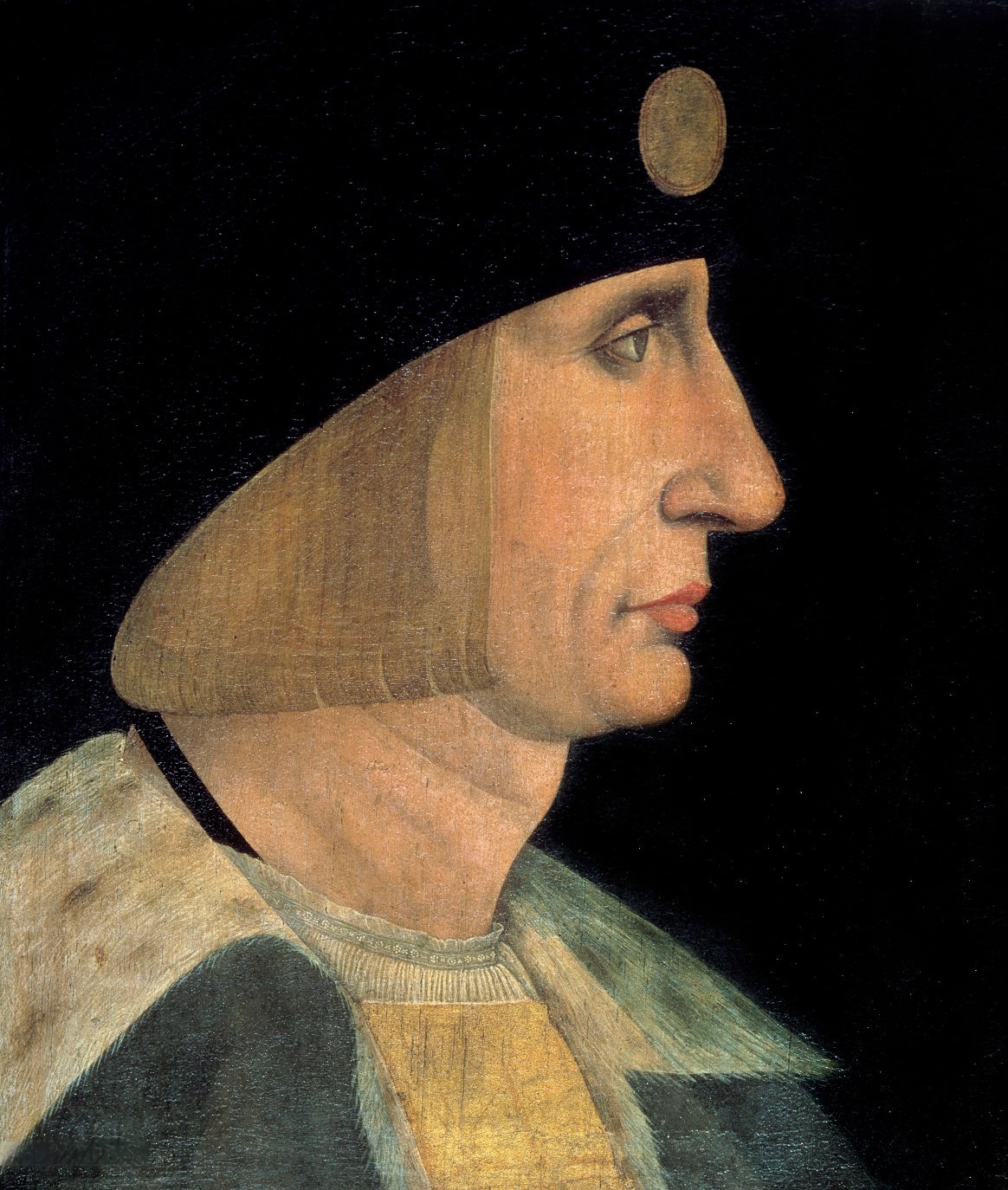
Portrait of Louis II of Orléans

Effigy of Francis II of Brittany at his tomb in Nantes Cathedral

With the end of the truce, the rebellion again erupted. Already in June 1486, Maximilian I of Austria had invaded the north of France, but then retreated; in November, the rebel François de Dunois seized the castle of Parthenay. On 11 January 1487, Louis of Orléans escaped from the castle of Blois and, pursued by royal archers, took refuge again in Brittany. The royal army left from Tours at the beginning of February and began its offensive in the southwest. At Bordeaux on 7 March, Odet d'Aydie, the pro-rebel governor of Guyenne, was deposed and replaced by Pierre de Beaujeu. As the royal army suppressed the rebels in Guyenne, Count Charles of Angoulême surrendered on 19 March 1487. The royal army set out from Bordeaux on the 15th, to take Parthenay on the 30th, Dunois managing to join Louis of Orléans in Nantes. The royal army then proceeded towards Brittany. With the Treaty of Chateaubriant, most of the Breton nobility came to an accommodation with the King. Royal forces agreed that the Duke would not be threatened by the army, which would leave Brittany as soon as the two rebels (Orléans and Dunois) were captured.

Meanwhile, in the north, the Marshal de Esquerdes successfully pushed back Maximilian I of Austria, who shortly afterwards was elected King of the Romans prior to becoming Holy Roman Emperor. In the south, the Lord de Candale beat Alain d'Albret, a leading rebel, at the Battle of Nontron. D'Albret had intended to join the rebels in the north, but was forced to give up hostages. In Brittany, the allies of the royal party directed by the Viscount de Rohan held the north of the duchy, and took Ploërmel.

In April 1487, Duke Francis II's attempt to mobilize Breton military forces (nobility and urban militia) failed due to widespread resentment of the corruption of his government. At the same time, the royal army advanced into Brittany. It was accommodated favorably in Châteaubriant, Vitré, Ancenis, and Clisson. It besieged Nantes, but Cornish allies of Brittany, helped by foreign mercenaries, broke the siege. At the same time, Norman corsairs blockaded the Breton coast to stop further pro-Breton forces arriving from Britain and elsewhere.

On 20 January 1488, the Dukes of Orléans and Brittany were both declared rebels at the Parlement of Paris. They and their associates were no longer regarded as vassals, but rather as subjects, and thus guilty of lèse-majesté. In the spring, the Duke of Orléans renewed the struggle for his ally, taking Vannes, Auray, and Ploërmel, and forcing the Viscount of Rohan to capitulate.

On 24 April 1488, a judgment of confiscation was declared against all the goods of Louis of Orléans. Meanwhile, Alain d'Albret had obtained a subsidy from the court of Spain, and thereupon joined the Duke of Brittany with 5,000 men. Maximilian I of Austria sent 1,500 men to him, and the English leader Lord Scales successfully landed with additional reinforcements. Despite this concentration of forces the Breton alliance was still outnumbered. It was further weakened because Maximilian I was diverted by a rebellion in Flanders, which was being supported by the Marshal de Esquerdes. The various lords supporting the Duke of Brittany were also in dispute with each other for the hand of Anne of Brittany: Louis of Orléans, Alain d'Albret, and Maximilian I all being candidates.

The French royal general Louis II de la Trémoille gathered his forces on the border of the duchy, preparing to attack. On 12 July, royal forces captured Fougères and then Dinan. On 28 July 1488, the main Breton and French armies met at the Battle of Saint-Aubin-du-Cormier. The Breton forces, led by Marshal de Rieux, were decisively beaten by the French. The defeat put an end to the war. The Duke of Orléans was captured and Duke Francis II was forced to accept a punitive treaty.

== Treaty and aftermath ==
On 20 August 1488, the Treaty of Sablé, also known as the "Treaty of le Verger" or "Treaty of the Orchard", was signed between Francis II of Brittany and King Charles VIII of France. Francis acknowledged himself as a vassal of the king, promised to remove foreign troops from the duchy and to no longer summon such troops, and to pledge the territories conquered by France to remain under their control. In turn, Charles removed his forces from Brittany except in the town garrisons of the territories pledged by Francis. The most interesting stipulation of the pact was that it required the agreement of the French king to any marriage of the daughters of Francis II. Amnesty was granted to d'Aydie, Dunois, and the majority of the combatants. Louis of Orléans was imprisoned in a fortress, but when Charles VIII reached his majority three years later and assumed the regency, he pardoned Louis.

Francis II wanted his daughter Anne to marry Maximilian I of Austria as a means to (hopefully) ensure the sovereignty of Brittany. Francis II died on 9 September 1488, and Anne was enthroned as duchess in January of the following year. Francis' loyal supporters facilitated the union with Maximilian for Anne in a marriage by proxy held 19 December 1490. Unfortunately, this violated the Treaty of Sablé as the king of France did not consent to this marriage, and it also placed the rule of Brittany in the hands of an enemy of France. As a result, France resumed its armed conflict with Brittany. The spring of 1491 brought new successes by the French general La Trémoille, and Charles VIII of France came to lay siege to Rennes. Maximilian failed to come to his bride's assistance, and Rennes fell. Anne became engaged to Charles and traveled to Langeais to be married. Although Austria made diplomatic protests, Anne was wed to Charles VIII on 6 December 1491. The marriage was subsequently validated by Pope Innocent VIII on 15 February 1492.
