= Odets =

Odets is a surname. Notable people with the surname include:

- Clifford Odets (1906–1963), American playwright, screenwriter, and director
- Walt Odets (born 1947), American psychologist and author

== See also ==
- Odet (disambiguation)
