= Odet d'Aydie =

Knight from Béarn, Lord of Lescun from 1426 – 1498

Odet d'Aydie (c. 1425 – August 1490) was a knight from Béarn, Lord of Lescun. He held the titles of count of Comminges and governor of Guyenne at the end of the 15th century. He was the son of Bertrand d'Aydie and his first wife Marie Domin.

== Biography ==
His career began in 1454 when he was appointed bailiff of Cotentin, a position he held until 1461. He was a confidant of Charles de France, Duke of Berry (1472), brother of King Louis XI. He took part in all the conspiracies against the king, including the League of the Public Weal (1465) and the Mad War.

Thanks to the support of Charles, he became admiral in 1469. After the death of Charles of France in November 1472, he rallied on the side of King Louis XI. He was appointed Admiral of France and remained great seneschal of Guyenne.

In 1473, he received the county of Comminges, the viscounty of Fronsac with the seigniory of Coutras. He married Marie of Lescun, lady of Lescun and baroness of Esparros, the heiress of Lescun and the daughter of Mathieu of Lescun and Diane of Béarn (natural daughter of John I, Count of Foix, Count of Foix and Viscount of Béarn, whose husband Mathieu was the cousin of the bastard of Armagnac Jean of Lescun, Marshal of France and already Count of Comminges). In 1479 he became governor of Rouen and Caen, and played an important role at the court of the Duke of Brittany, Francis II. He opposed Anne of France, daughter of Louis XI and regent for his brother Charles VIII and rallied with the Duke of Orleans, the future King Louis XII. He was appointed governor of Guyenne in 1484 – while remaining seneschal. However his participation in the Mad War made him lose all of his titles (1487).

== Marriage and family ==
Odet d'Aydie married Marie of Lescun, heiress of the property of his family (including Esparros). They had two daughters:

- Jeanne d'Aydie, wife of Jean de Foix, Viscount of Lautrec, in 1480, mother of, among others, Odet of Foix.
- Madeleine d'Aydie, wife of Louis de Gramont, Viscount of Castillon.
