= Jean IV de Rieux =

Breton nobleman

Arms of Jean IV de Rieux

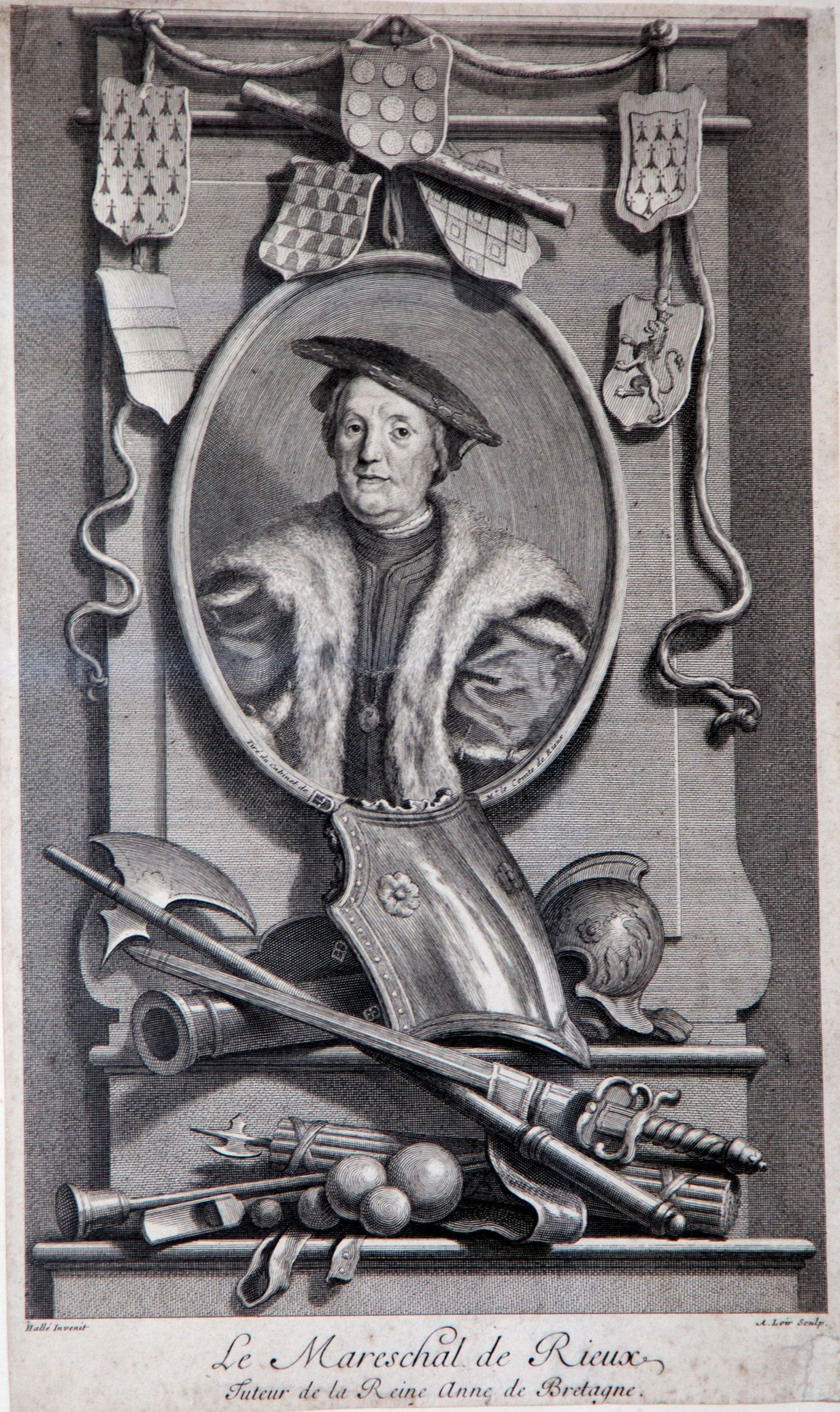
18th century engraving of Jean IV de Rieux by Alexis Loir after Noël Hallé

Jean IV de Rieux (June 27, 1447 – February 9, 1518), was a Breton noble and Marshal. He was the son of Jean III de Rieux and Béatrice de Rohan-Montauban (1385–1414).

He ruled Brittany as regent of Anne of Brittany.

He is best known for being the commander of the Breton army against King Charles VIII of France, which ended in a crushing defeat at the Battle of Saint-Aubin-du-Cormier (1488).

He was also Count of Aumale and Count of Harcourt.

He married Isabelle de Brosse (died 1527), daughter of Jean III de Brosse, Comte de Penthièvre.

Renée de Rieux, La Belle Châteauneuf, was one of his descendants.
