= Philippe de Crèvecœur d'Esquerdes =

French military commander (1418–1494)

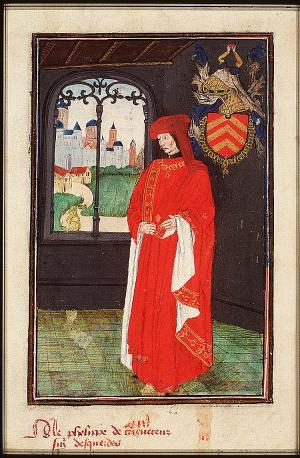
Philippe de Crèvecœur

Philippe de Crèvecœur, seigneur d'Esquerdes (1418–1494), was a French military commander and a Marshal of France in 1486. He is also known as Maréchal des Cordes or Maréchal d'Esquerdes.

== Biography ==
He was the son of Jacques († 1436), Lord of Crèvecœur and Thois, Captain of Compiègne, Governor of Clermont-en-Beauvaisis and a Knight in the Order of the Golden Fleece. Philippe entered the service of Charles the Bold, Duke of Burgundy. He was governor of Troyes in 1463 and distinguished himself in 1465 at the Battle of Montlhéry.

In 1467, he fought in the Liège Wars against the Prince-Bishopric of Liège and was awarded the Order of the Golden Fleece.

He was then governor of Artois and Picardy, where he defended Abbeville against Louis XI. In 1472, he conquered Nesle, but failed to take Beauvais defended by Jeanne Hachette.

When Charles the Bold was killed in 1477 without a male heir, Crèvecœur went over to serve King Louis XI of France, who claimed all the lands owned by Charles. Crèvecœur remained governor of Picardy and also brought Artois under French rule, delivering Arras to the French Army. For this, he received the Order of Saint Michael.

In the Battle of Guinegate (1479) he was defeated by Maximilian I, Holy Roman Emperor. Nevertheless, he was made Marshal of France and Lieutenant-General of the King's army in Picardy in 1486.

During the Mad War, he was successful in stopping the attacks of the Imperial forces. He defeated Adolph of Cleves, Lord of Ravenstein in 1486, and captured during the Battle of Béthune in 1487, Charles II, Duke of Guelders and Engelbert II of Nassau. He also took Saint-Omer and Thérouanne.

In 1492, he negotiated the Peace of Etaples with King Henry VII of England.

When Charles VIII of France prepared his Italian campaign in 1494, Crèvecœur was given the command of the vanguard, but he died on the 22nd of April at L'Arbresle near Lyon, before the start of the campaign.

He had no children and was buried in the Notre-Dame church of Boulogne-sur-Mer.

== Media ==
- He portrayed in Sir Walter Scott's 1823 novel Quentin Durward as a wise counselor, attempting to avoid war between Charles the Bold and Louis XI of France.
