= Alexis Loir =

Alexis III Loir
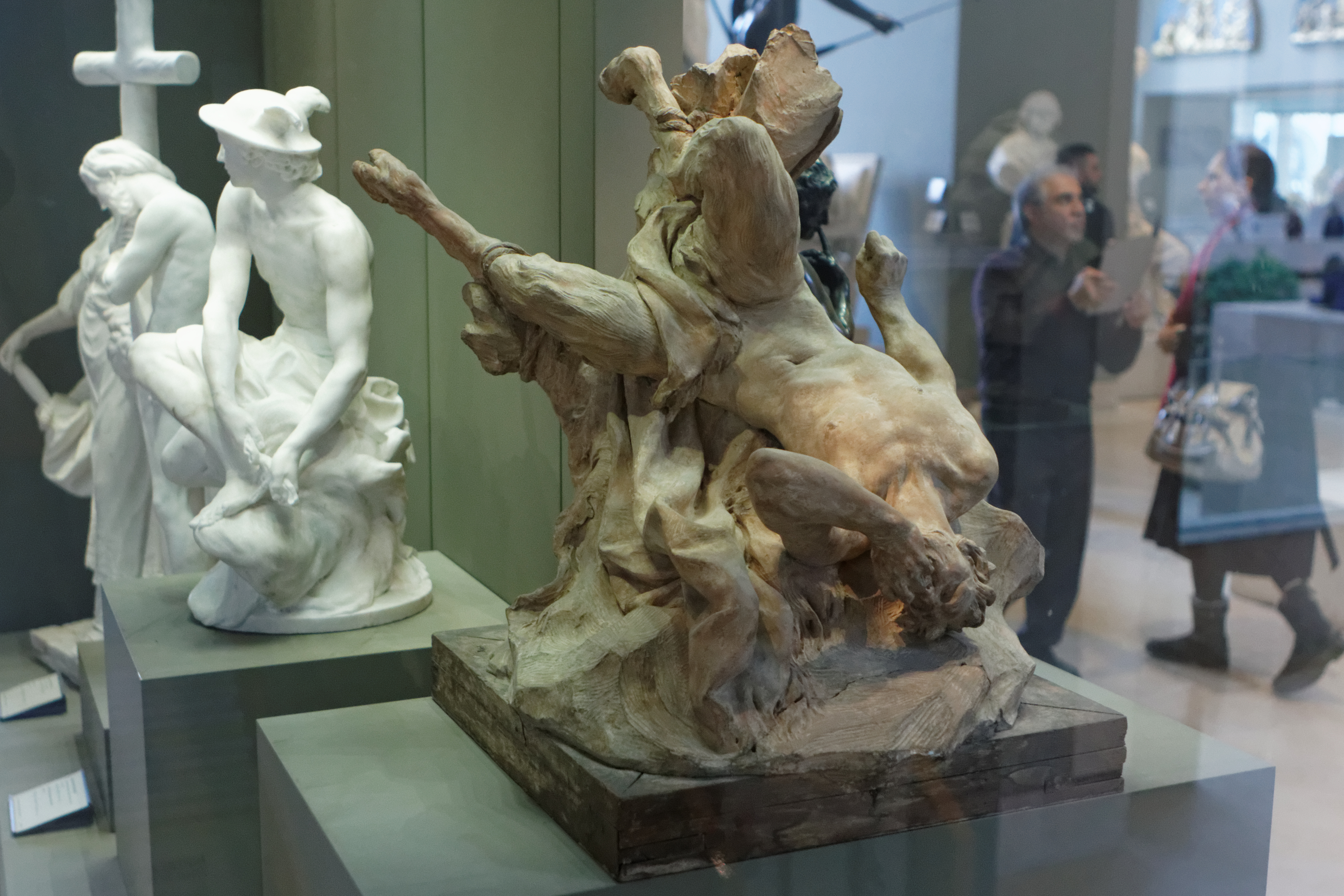
- Marsyas Overthrown
- Born: 1712; Paris
- Died: 18 August 1785 (aged 72–73); Paris
- Occupations: Sculptor, painter
- Relatives: Marianne Loir (sister); Alexis I Loir (nephew)

Alexis Loir, also known as Alexis III Loir, was a French painter and sculptor. He was born in Paris in 1712 and died in the same city in 1785.

== Biography ==
Born into a renowned family of Parisian goldsmiths dating back to the 15th century in the parish of Saint-Jacques-la-Boucherie, Alexis Loir was the son of goldsmith Nicolas Loir and the younger brother of Marianne Loir (1705–1783), also a painter, and Jean-Baptiste Loir (1716), a goldsmith and merchant. He was the uncle of the painter and engraver Alexis Loir (the Roman).

Admitted to the Académie royale de peinture et de sculpture in Paris on April 30, 1746, he did not submit his reception piece until much later. Instead of the pastel portrait the academy had requested, they accepted a terracotta sculpture titled Marsyas Overthrown and a bust of Charles André van Loo in 1746.

He traveled to England in 1753 and to Russia from 1763 to 1769. Upon returning to France, he settled in Béarn in 1772. In 1775, King Louis XVI granted him a scholarship of 225 livres.

He was officially received with his reception piece on February 27, 1779, a portrait of Clément-Louis-Marie-Anne Belle (1722–1806). He was appointed adviser to the Académie royale in Paris in 1783.

== Works ==
- Paris, Louvre
  - Study for the portrait of Clément Belle, drawing squared for transfer, charcoal on paper with white highlights; dimensions: 36.2 × 32 cm
  - Portrait of Clément Belle, painter, seated nearly full-length, 1779, pastel, 94 × 74 cm
  - Marsyas Overthrown, 1746, terracotta, 61.8 × 52.2 × 49.5 cm
- Pau, Musée des Beaux-Arts
  - Self-Portrait, 1772, pastel, 36 × 28 cm;
  - Portrait of the Marquis de Candau, 1772, pastel, 54 × 43 cm
  - La Présidente Bayard, née Marie-Victoire Caroline de Duplaa
- Rennes, Musée des Beaux-Arts
  - Project for an allegory, pen and brown ink, grey wash with white highlights, traces of black chalk

== Prints ==
- Messire Charles Gérin (1661–1746), Doctor of the Sorbonne, former parish priest of Sainte-Croix de la Cité, 1746, painted and engraved by Alexis Loir, 'the Roman', nephew of Alexis III Loir, mezzotint, 32.9 × 23.2 cm
- The Adoration of the Magi, circa 1700, after Jean Jouvenet, copper engraving, 58.8 × 42.5 cm
- Jean-Marie Leclair the Elder (1697–1764), 1741, musician, composer, ballet master of the King's Chamber, print by Alexis III Loir and Jean-Charles François (1717–1769), 30.7 × 22 cm

== Salons and exhibitions ==
- Salon of 1746
- Salon of 1747: Mr. Loir holding a letter, pastel
- Salon of 1748: Mlle de Billy; Mme de Julienne, pastels
- Salon of 1759: Two heads of children, pastel
- Salon of 1779: Portrait of Clément Belle, pastel
- Salon of 1785: Jean de Jullienne, bust
- 1891: exhibition at the Musée de Pau
- 1979: London, Heim Gallery, Vestals Sacrificed

== General references ==
- Bellier de la Chavignerie and Louis Auvray, Dictionnaire général des artistes de l'école française depuis l'origine des arts du dessin jusqu'à nos jours, architectes, peintres, sculpteur, graveurs et lithographes, Paris, Éd. Renouard, 1882
- Bénézit Dictionary of Artists
- Collective work, Jean-René Gaborit (ed.), Sculpture Française II Renaissance et Temps modernes, Paris, RMN, 1998
- Philippe Renard, Portraits et autoportraits d'artistes au xviiie siècle, Éd. Renaissance du Livre, 2003, 189 p. (ISBN 2 804 608166)
- Neil Jeffares, Dictionary of Pastellists before 1800
