= Louis II de la Trémoille =

French general (1460–1525)

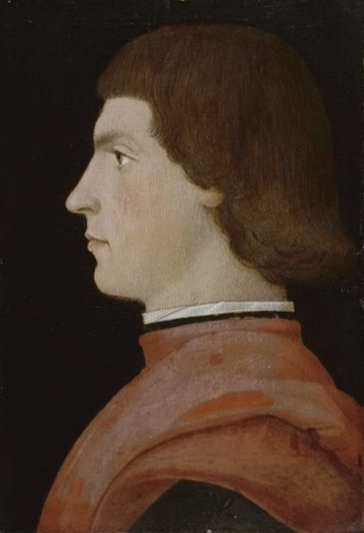
- Portrait of Louis II de la Trémoille by Domenico Ghirlandaio or one of his assistants

Personal details
- Born: 29 September 1460 Thouars, Poitou, Kingdom of France
- Died: 24 February 1525 (aged 64) Pavia, Duchy of Milan
- Cause of death: Wound inflicted by an arquebus
- Spouse(s): Gabrielle de Bourbon (m. 1484) Louise Borgia (m. 1517)
- Children: Charles I de la Trémoille
- Parent: Louis I de la Trémoille (father)
- Relatives: Louis I, Count of Montpensier; François II de La Trémoille; Louise de Coëtivy; Cesare Borgia

Military service
- Battles/wars: Mad War; Battle of Saint-Aubin-du-Cormier; Italian Wars; Battle of Fornovo; Battle of Novara; Battle of Agnadello; Battle of Novara; Siege of Dijon; Battle of Marignano; Battle of Pavia †
- Titles: 12: Vicomte de Thouars; Prince de Talmond; Comte de Guînes et de Bénon; Baron de Sully; Baron de Craon; Baron de Montagu; Baron de Mauléon; Baron de l'Ile-Bouchard; Seigneur des Iles de Ré; Seigneur de Rochefort; Seigneur de Marans; Premier Chambellan du Roi

Louis II de la Trémoille (29 September 1460 – 24 February 1525), also known as La Trimouille, was a French general. He served under three kings: Charles VIII, Louis XII and Francis I. He was killed in combat at the Battle of Pavia.

== Military career ==
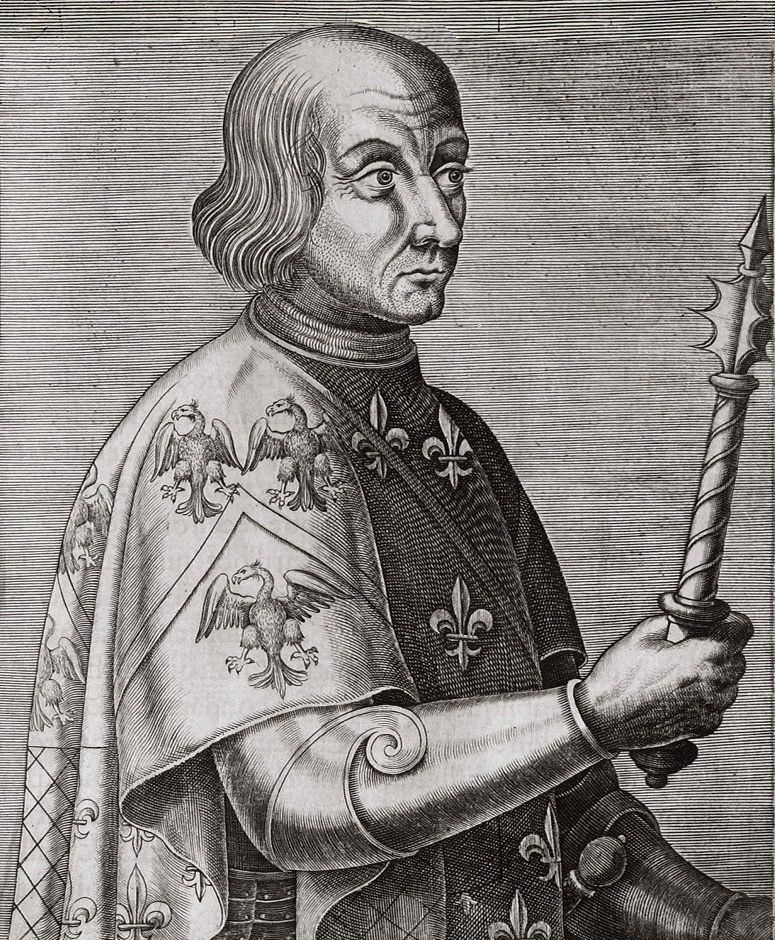
Louis II de La Trémoille in an ancient engraving.

Louis was born in Thouars, the eldest son of Louis I de la Trémoille. He commanded an army that attempted to secure Brittany for the French crown after internal revolts had weakened Francis II, Duke of Brittany during the so-called "Mad War" (La Guerre Folle). By March 1488, Louis had been appointed lieutenant-general of Brittany by Charles VIII. His decisive victory at the Battle of Saint-Aubin-du-Cormier on 28 July 1488 ended effective Breton independence.

Louis took part in several battles in the Italian Wars, notably the Battle of Fornovo in 1495 and the Battle of Agnadello of 1509. He suffered a severe defeat at the Battle of Novara, in which his 10,000-strong army was ambushed by 13,000 Swiss mercenaries.
The Swiss subsequently invaded France. De la Trémoille was then sent to Dijon and defended the city when the Swiss laid siege to it in September 1513. He succeeded in negotiating the departure of the besiegers on 13 September, by promising them 400,000 écus.

Louis went on to secure a French victory under the command of Francis I at the Battle of Marignano in 1515, but he perished at the Battle of Pavia on 24 February 1525, where he died of a wound inflicted by an arquebus. His death occurred during the climax of the battle when the French were surprised by 1,500 Spanish arquebusiers. La Trémoille and other high-ranking Frenchmen fought their way towards their king, Francis I, in order to protect him. La Trémoille fell from his horse after being shot through the heart.

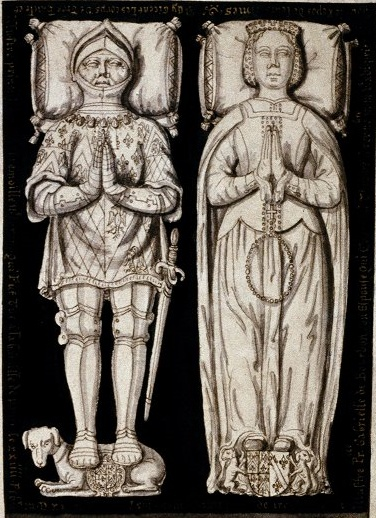
Louis II de la Trémoille and Gabrielle de Bourbon.

== Marriage ==
On 28 July 1484, Louis married Gabrielle de Bourbon, daughter of Louis I, Count of Montpensier, they had:

- Charles I de la Trémoille (1485-1515 Marignano), married Louise de Coëtivy, they had: François II de La Trémoille

On 7 April 1517, Louis II de la Trémoille married 16-year-old Louise Borgia, Duchess of Valentinois, the only legitimate child of Cesare Borgia, Duke of Valentinois by his French wife Charlotte of Albret. The marriage was childless.

== Titles ==
During the course of his career, Louis earned the title Vicomte de Thouars, Prince de Talmond, Comte de Guînes et de Bénon, Baron de Sully, de Craon, de Montagu, de Mauléon et de l'Ile-Bouchard, Seigneur des Iles de Ré, de Rochefort et de Marans, and Premier Chambellan du Roi.

== Legacy ==
Rue de La Trémoille, in the 8th arrondissement of Paris, is named after him.

Trimouille Island, Montebello Islands, Western Australia

== See also ==
- La Trémoille family

== Sources ==
- Bardet, Jean-Pierre; Dinet, Dominique; Poussou, Jean-Pierre; Vignal, Marie Catherine, eds. (2000). Etat et société en France aux XVIIe et XVIIIe siècles (in French). Presses de l'Universitie de Paris-Sorbonne.
- Bongard, David (1995). "Louis II de Trémoille". In Dupuy, Trevor N.; Johnson, Curt; Bongard, David L. (eds.). The Harper Encyclopedia of Military Biography. Castle Books.
- Knecht, Robert (2004). The Valois: Kings of France 1328–1589. Hambledon Continuum.
- Taylor, Jane H. M. (2014). Rewriting Arthurian Romance in Renaissance France. D.S. Brewer.
