= Battle of Saint-Aubin-du-Cormier (1488) =

1488 French defeat of Brittany in the Mad War

Coordinates: 48°15′37″N 1°23′51″W

- Part of the Mad War
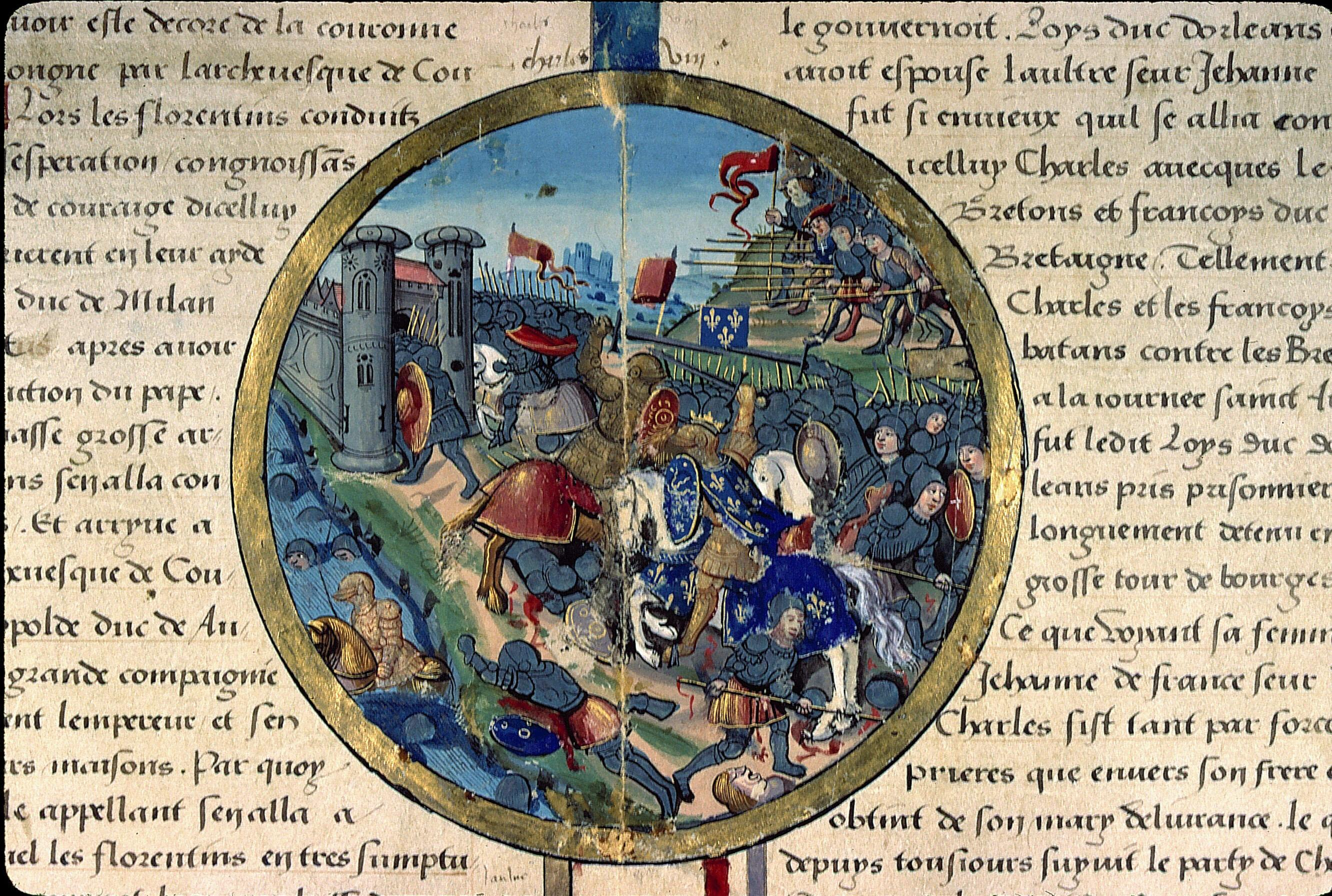
- 1520 illustration of the battle in 'Histoire universelle'
Date	28 July 1488
Location	Saint-Aubin-du-Cormier (Ille-et-Vilaine), Brittany
Result	French victory

Belligerents
Kingdom of France	Duchy of Brittany; Holy Roman Empire; Kingdom of England; Kingdom of Castile and León

Commanders and leaders
Louis II de la Trémoille; Jean de Baudricourt; Jean II de Rohan	Maréchal de Rieux, Duke of Orléans, John IV of Chalon-Arlay, Prince of Orange; Alain d'Albret, Edward Woodville, Lord Scales †

Strength
15,000	11,500

Casualties and losses
1,500	Around 5,000 – 6,000

The Battle of Saint-Aubin-du-Cormier took place on 28 July 1488, between the forces of King Charles VIII of France, and those of Francis II, Duke of Brittany, and his allies. The defeat of the latter signalled the end to the "guerre folle" ('Mad war'), a feudal conflict in which French aristocrats revolted against royal power during the regency of Anne de Beaujeu. It also effectively precipitated the end of the independence of Brittany from France.

== Causes ==
Brittany, Burgundy, and England had been repeatedly allied to resist the expansion of the French state. In the aftermath of the death of Charles the Bold of Burgundy in 1477, the Burgundian threat to French power was all-but eliminated. Brittany became the main base for the feudal aristocrats in the League of the Public Weal, an alliance founded by Charles the Bold to resist the centralisation of power in the king.

By 1488 the regime of Duke Francis had been severely weakened by conflict between his prime-minister Pierre Landais and a group of aristocrats led by the Prince of Orange John IV of Chalon-Arlay. Landais was keen to strengthen ties with England. His opponents secured French support for an armed incursion to overthrow and execute Landais in 1485, after which Jean de Rieux became de facto chief minister.

Francis was keen to secure the independence of Brittany and to construct a network of alliances to achieve that objective, offering the prospect of marriage to his daughter and heir Anne of Brittany to several possible allies. Rebel lords from the League, notably Louis d'Orléans, had sought sanctuary in Brittany. The French saw this as a violation of royal rights, and demanded the return of the lords, asserting that they had the right to take them by force if Francis refused.

== Background ==
Under the leadership of Louis II de la Trémoille, the French royal army had struck against Vannes and Fougères, controlling access to Brittany. The French attempted to take control of the major strategic strongholds.

The Bretons had sought support from various rebel lords and opponents of expanding French power. Alain d'Albret, a rebel lord, believing he would marry Anne, had reinforced the Breton army with 5,000 troops supplied by the king of Spain. Maximilian I of Austria also sent 1,500 men. Henry VII of England was also approached for support, but refused to send troops and instead attempted to negotiate a deal with the French to stop the invasion. However the English knight Edward Woodville, Lord Scales, defied Henry and brought over a small force of 700 archers he had gathered from his base in the Isle of Wight. The Bretons decided to create the impression that Henry had changed his mind and had sent a large force of longbowmen, dressing 1,300 of their own men in the English cross of St George and adding them to Lord Scales' troops to create a vanguard of 2,000 men.

Despite this concentration of forces the Breton alliance was still significantly outnumbered. It was further weakened because Maximilian I was diverted by a rebellion in Flanders, which was being supported by Marshal de Esquerdes. The Breton forces thus comprised a mix of local troops with Gascons, Germans, English longbowmen, and non-Breton aristocrats who were challenging royal power.

The French army included Swiss and Italian mercenaries, and also some pro-royal Breton noblemen. It had the most powerful artillery of the era.

== Battle ==
The Breton commander de Rieux positioned his forces on a ridge around a mile to the south of Mézières-sur-Couesnon. French forces arrived at the field in disparate groups, with no idea that the Bretons were so close. The Bretons initially had the advantage that the French were fragmented and not arrayed in battle order. Lord Scales and de Rieux were in favour of a rapid attack on the French before they could manoeuvre into effective battle order, but d'Albret insisted on redeploying his troops. As a result, de la Trémoille had time to place his army in a defensive formation. The Breton vanguard under Lord Scales then led the attack in an arrow-head formation.

According to Jean Molinet, "the English archers showed great courage, for each of the opposing parties fought for victory." Scales himself was apparently killed at some point in this stage of the battle. Nevertheless, the French were forced to pull back, giving the archers a chance to attack the French lines, causing panic, which was stemmed by the French commanders.

Meanwhile, the Breton centre under d'Albret was moving forward, having been suffering significant casualties from the powerful French artillery in its static position. The redeployment caused a gap to open in the Breton lines. Jacques Galliota, an Italian captain in the French army, immediately asked permission from Trémoille to exploit the opportunity. Trémoille agreed, and Galliota led a cavalry attack on the weakened position. Galliota himself was killed, but the Italians opened a gap through which the cavalry passed. D'Albret and de Rieux failed to deploy their own cavalry in time to stem the gap, and Trémoille quickly sent in more French troops. At the same time there was a massive explosion in one of the magazines behind the Breton lines, probably caused by stray shot. Panic ran through the Breton army, leading to a rout of their forces.

== Consequences ==
The defeat of Francis II forced him to accept a treaty which deprived him of power by requiring him to expel foreign princes and troops from Brittany. It also restricted his ability to marry his children to suitors of his choosing and required that he cede territory in Saint-Malo, Fougères, Dinan, and Saint-Aubin to the king as a guarantee that in the absence of a male successor the king would determine the succession. Francis died a few months later leaving only a daughter, Anne of Brittany, so the treaty was used to force her, as his successor, to marry King Charles VIII, and then Louis XII.

The battle of Saint-Aubin-du-Cormier also destroyed the power-base of the warring princes. Edward Woodville was killed, along with his entire force. Louis of Orléans (the future Louis XII), and Jean IV, Prince of Orange were captured. Alain d'Albret and the Maréchal de Rieux succeeded in escaping, and played an important part in continuing the conflict. Despite the French victory, the guerre folle dragged on for three more years until December 1491, when Charles married Anne.

== Role in Breton nationalism ==
Since the emergence of modern Breton nationalism in the 19th century, the battle has been portrayed as the moment when Brittany lost its independence, despite the three years of struggle which followed it and the continued nominal independence of the Duchy into the 16th century. It is thus regarded by nationalists as a tragic episode in the history of Brittany. In the words of Leon Meur, "the battle of Saint-Aubin rang the death-knell of Breton independence". The Breton nationalist Célestin Lainé, who sided with Nazi Germany in World War II, stated that his SS-affiliated Bezen Perrot militia was the first Breton force to have fought against France since the battle. At his death he requested that his ashes be scattered on the spot.

The Breton National Party placed a cross at the site of the battle in 1932. To mark the 500th anniversary of the battle a large monument was erected in 1988, comprising a raised platform with plaques commemorating the forces involved, surmounted by a shield bearing the Breton Ducal coat of arms and a Cross pattée. The Breton nationalist organization Koun Breizh commemorates the battle at the site on the last Sunday of every July, and the far-right nationalist group Adsav also commemorates it in September.

A plan in 2000 to bury domestic waste on the site of the battle caused such protests from the Breton movement that the project was abandoned. A "cairn of liberty" was built at the site of the proposed dump. Breton nationalist groups subsequently acquired part of the land with the intention of creating a sculpture park and visitor centre.

== Sources ==
- L'État Breton, tome 2 de l' Histoire de la Bretagne et des pays celtiques, Morlaix, Éditions Skol Vreizh, 1966
- Philippe Contamine, Bataille de Saint-Aubin-du-Cormier, in Jacques Garnier dir. Dictionnaire Perrin des guerres et batailles de l'histoire de France, Paris : Perrin, 2004.
- Georges Minois. Anne de Bretagne. Paris : Fayard, 1999.
- Philippe Tourault. Anne de Bretagne. Paris : Perrin, 1990.
- Collectif d’universitaires des universités de Brest, Nantes, Rennes, Toute l’histoire de Bretagne, dans l'Ile de Bretagne et sur le continent, ouvrage in-8°, 800 pages, éditions Skol- Vreizh, Morlaix 1996
- Jean Kerhervé, L'État Breton aux XIVe et XVe siècles, 2 vol., Maloine, 1987. ISBN 2-224-01703-0. 2-224-01704-9
- Arthur Le Moyne de La Borderie, Membre de l'Institut, Histoire de la Bretagne, 6 volumes in-quarto, Plihon Editeur, Imprimerie Vatar, Rennes 1905-1914.
- Jean-Pierre Legay et Hervé Martin, Fastes et malheurs de la Bretagne ducale 1213-1532, Editions *Ouest-France Université, 435 pages, Rennes, 1982
- Antoine Dupuy, Histoire de l'union de la Bretagne à la France, 2 vol. de 447 p et 501 p., Librairie Hachette, Paris, 1880.
