= Hours of Margaret of Foix =

- Heures de Marguerite de Foix
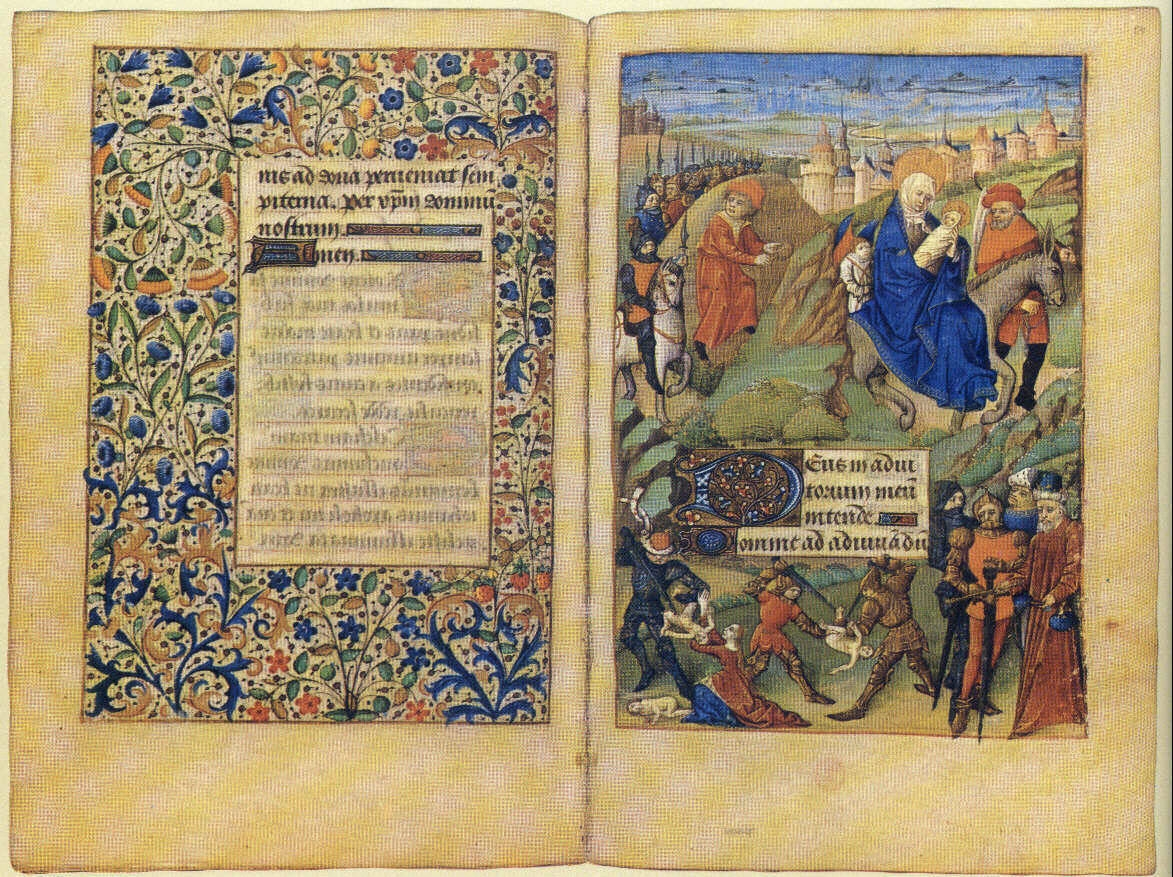
- Patron: Margaret of Foix
- Language: French and Latin
- Date: Between 1471 and 1486
- Manuscript(s): MSL/1910/2385, Salting 1222
- Genre: Book of Hours

The Hours of Margaret of Foix is an illuminated book of Hours, named after its patron, Margaret of Foix. It follows the Paris liturgy and was produced in France between 1471 and 1486. Many of the prayers included in this manuscript focus on childbirth, motherhood, and producing a male heir. The illuminations include scenes from the Passion of Christ and Christ's birth. It is now part of the Salting Collection in the Victoria and Albert Museum in London (Nr. 1222).

== Description ==
This manuscript is made of ink, pigments, and gold on parchment. The cover is made of calf-leather binding over wooden boards. The manuscript measures 17.6 by 10 cm and has 288 folios, bearing twenty-four illustrated calendars of saints, twelve large miniatures and twenty-five smaller miniatures.

The Hours of Margaret of Foix depicts scenes from the Passion of Christ and Christ's birth. The borders surrounding the miniatures are decorated using foliage, flowers, and fruit. The three distinct border styles may indicate that this manuscript is the work of several artists. Rowan Watson, senior curator at the National Art Library at the Victoria and Albert Museum, argues that the folios 208v-209r demonstrate the possibility of multiple artists through the different border styles surrounding the text and illustration of Saint Anthony.

The prayers of this book are in French or Latin. The text is written in lettre bâtard, a Gothic style of script.

There are twelve miniatures in the calendar for each of the Labors of the Months, twelve miniatures with Old Testament scenes, twenty-three half-page miniatures of holy figures, and two miniatures integrated into text pages.

One prayer at the end of the book was added in the late fifteenth or early sixteenth century.

== History ==
=== Patron ===
The patron of this manuscript was Margaret of Foix. Margaret of Foix was born to Gaston IV, and Eleanor, queen of Navarre. She was described by contemporaries at the time in a generally positive way, with descriptions noting her beauty and sophistication. Margaret married Francis II, Duke of Brittany, on June 26, 1471, which joined their two families in an alliance. Despite her own family's history of fertility problems, their marriage was meant to produce a male heir, which was especially important considering that Francis II had no male children from his first marriage. However, Margaret would go on to have two daughters named Anne and Isabeau.

There are a few indicators that this manuscript was originally owned by Margaret of Foix. The first is a prayer that mentions her by name, and the second is the inclusion of a coat of arms associated with her family. The prayer is found on folios 223-225v, and is from a female point of view praying for childbirth. The end of the prayer asks for a son for Francis and Margaret, indicating ownership of the manuscript. The coat of arms are found on folios 21V, 47r, and 222r, and are weathered. Interpretations of these coat of arms visually relate to the coat of arms of Brittany and Foix, relaying the connection formed between their marriage.

=== Creation ===
Scholars generally agree that the Hours of Margaret of Foix were created in France. Some scholars, such as Elizabeth L'Estrange and Rowan Watson, further specify Rennes, due to the illustration style.

There are conflicting interpretations in dating this manuscript. John Harthan writes that the wording of the prayer at the end of the manuscript implies that Margaret's daughter Anne had already been born and the prayers were meant to encourage the birth of a son. This interpretation dates the work to the time between Anne's birth and Margaret's death, placing the date at somewhere between 1477 and 1486. Rowan Watson interprets the prayer against sterility to mean that Margaret must not have had her child yet, dating the manuscript between 1471 and 1476. It is generally agreed, however, that the manuscript can safely be dated to sometime after 1471, the year of the marriage between Margaret and Francis.

=== Provenance ===
This manuscript was previously owned by Hippolyte d'Argenté, who gave it to Claude Dumolinet. It was also previously in the collection of Frédéric Spitzer. The manuscript found its current ownership when it was given to the Victoria and Albert Museum by George Salting in 1910.

== Interpretation ==
=== Childbirth and Producing an Heir ===
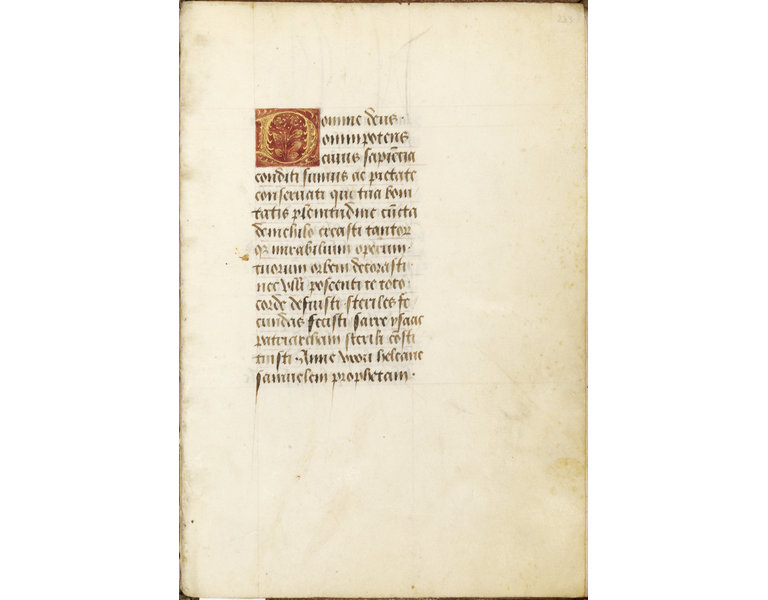
Prayer from the Hours of Margaret of Foix, f. 223r

The desire for a male heir is prevalent in interpretations of this manuscript. The manuscript can be understood as an anxious plea for a male heir, largely in part due to the issues of succession.

The pressure placed on Margaret to produce an heir escalated due to the fact that Francis II had an illegitimate son named Francis of Avaugour with his mistress, Antoinette de Maignelais. The social connotations of Francis' affair were also associated with Margaret's infertility. Many at the time believed that it was Francis' roguish actions that resulted in punishment from God, in the form of his wife's inability to birth a son.

The prayer written at the end of the manuscript prays against sterility in the marriage of Margaret of Foix and her husband Francis II. It lists women in the Bible who were unable to have children, but through the miraculous power of God, were able to give birth. It goes on to describe the numerous saints associated with the Christian origins of Brittany. This historical description is interpreted by some to function as a history of the blessed nature of the duchy, thus adding credibility to the plea for an heir.

=== Saint Margaret ===
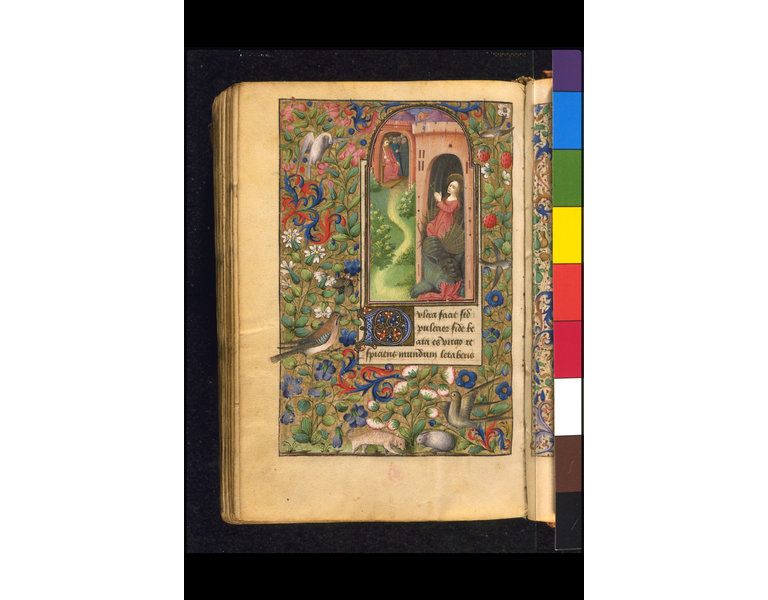
Saint Margaret, Suffrages, f. 215v

It may seem as though the inclusion of Saint Margaret of Antioch in this book of hours was due to her being the patron saint of Margaret of Foix. Even though this may have been the primary reason, another important connection comes from Saint Margaret as the patron saint of women in childbirth. According to legends of this saint, she emerged unharmed from the mouth of a dragon. At the time when this manuscript was created, this story was associated with the idea of a child emerging in childbirth unharmed. This standard iconography is included in the illustration of St. Margaret. Saint Margaret stands upright next to a monstrous dragon that has begun to eat her dress, signaling the consumption of Saint Margaret in the story. The inclusion of Saint Margaret and her iconography could underscore the desire for childbirth so prevalent in the manuscript.

== Gallery ==
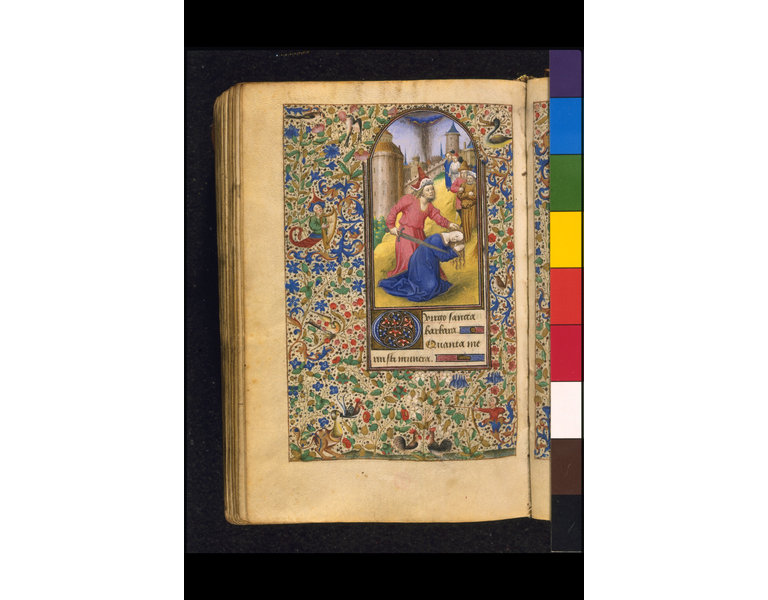

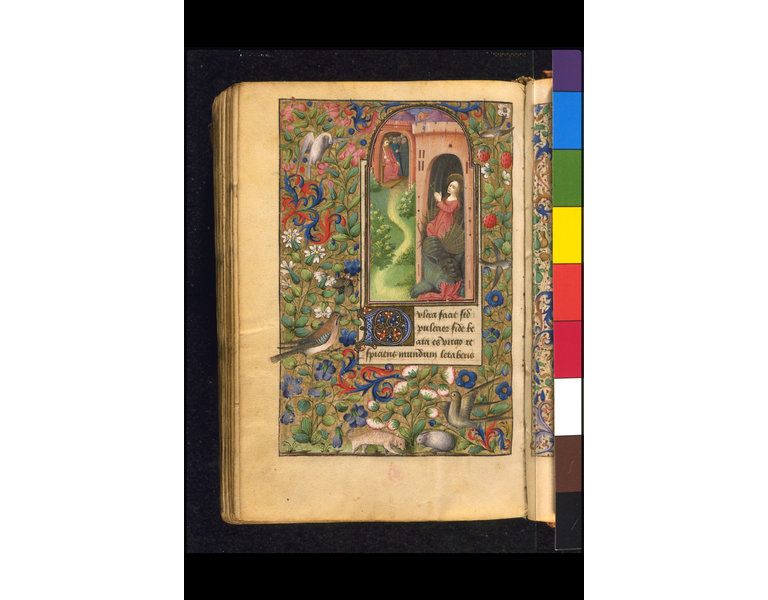

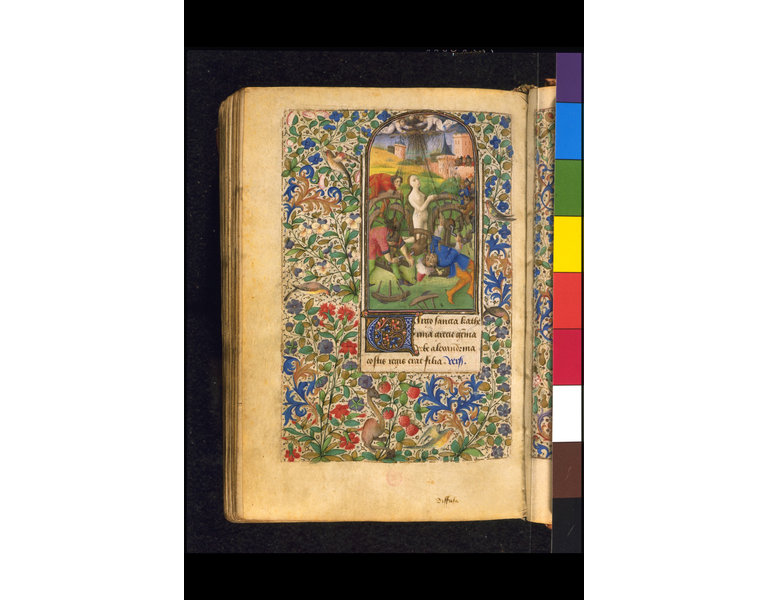

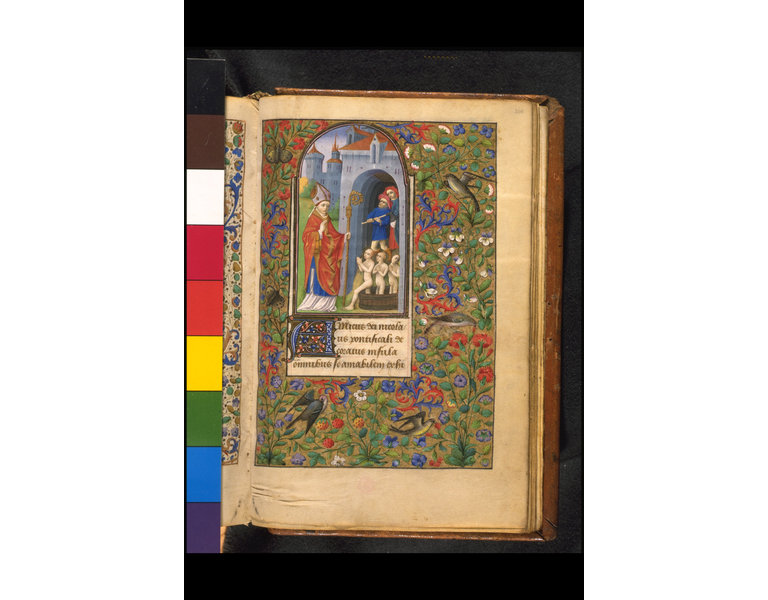

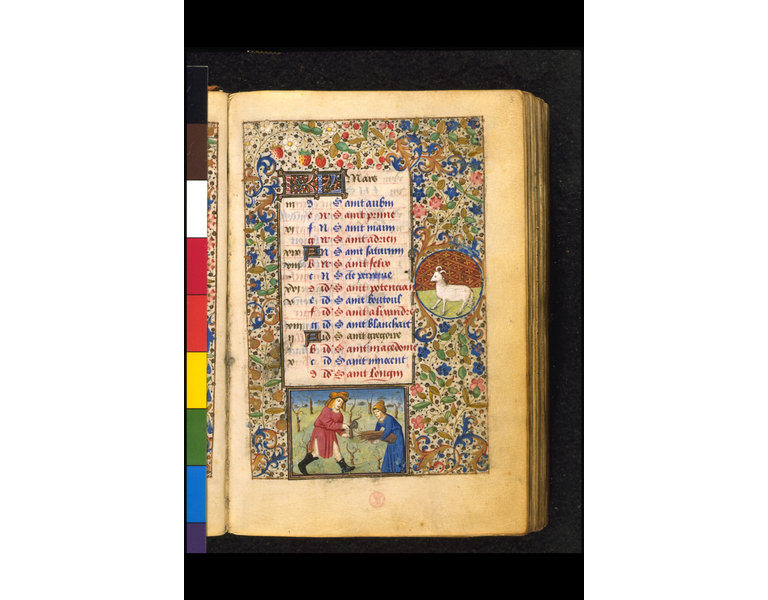

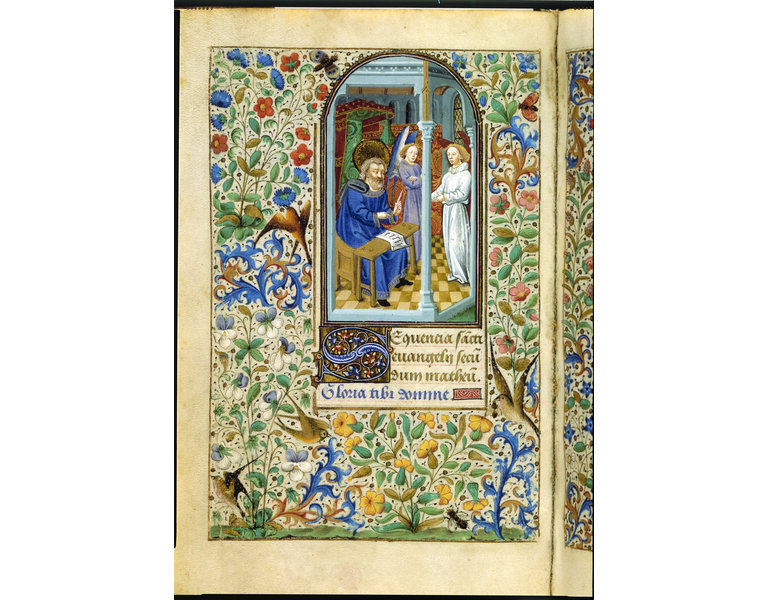

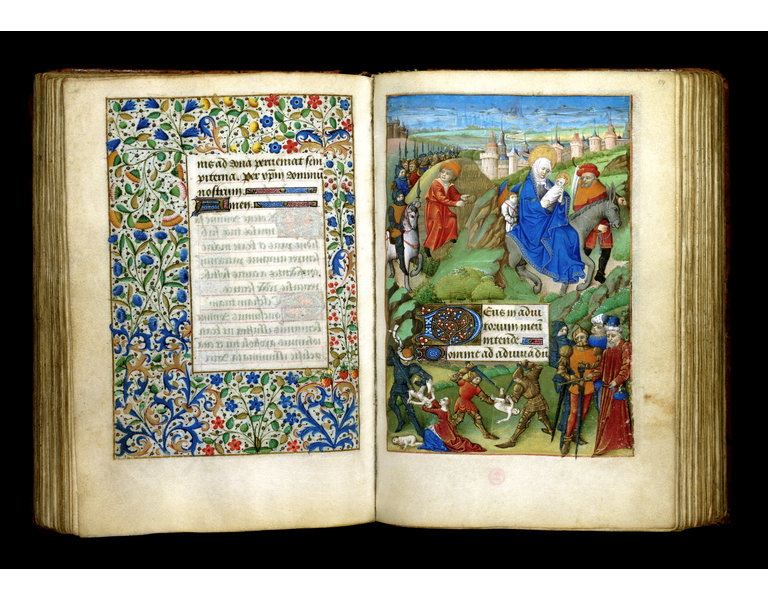

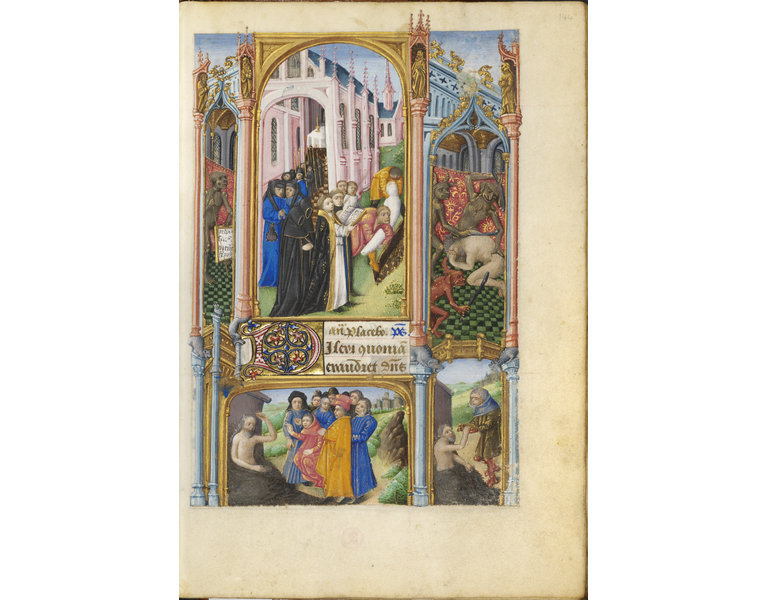

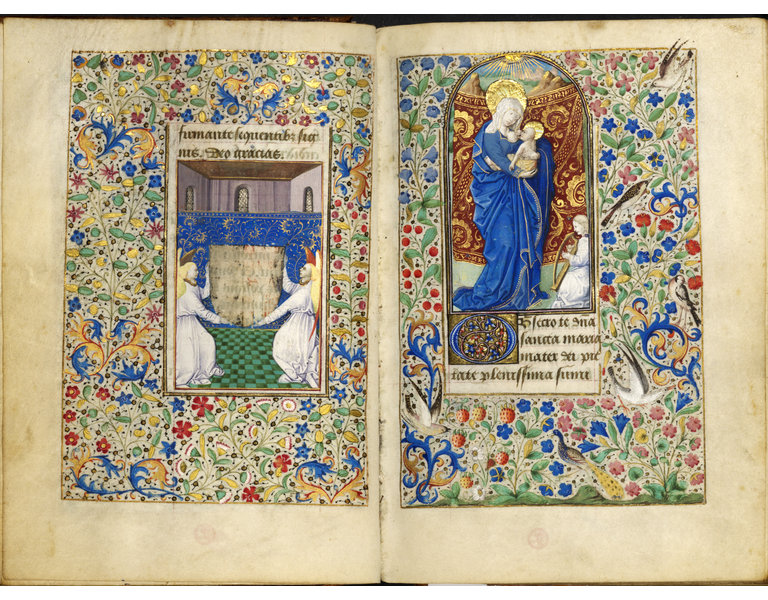

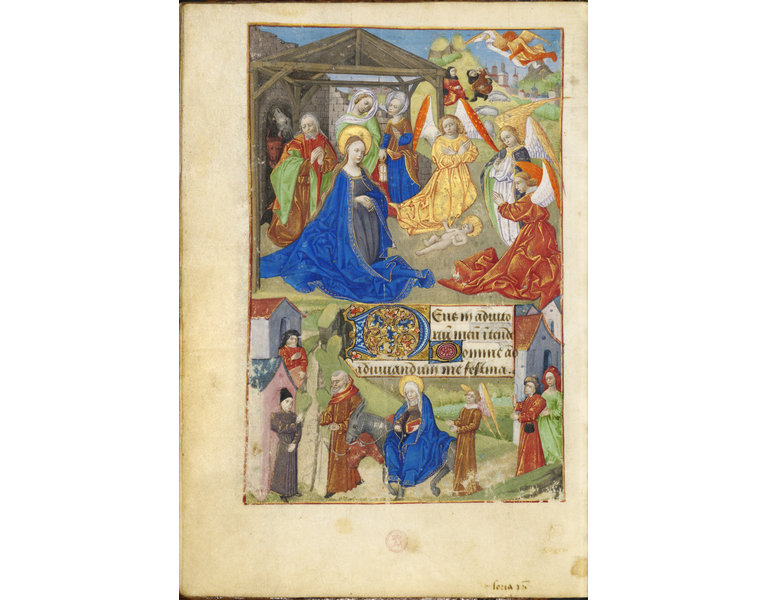

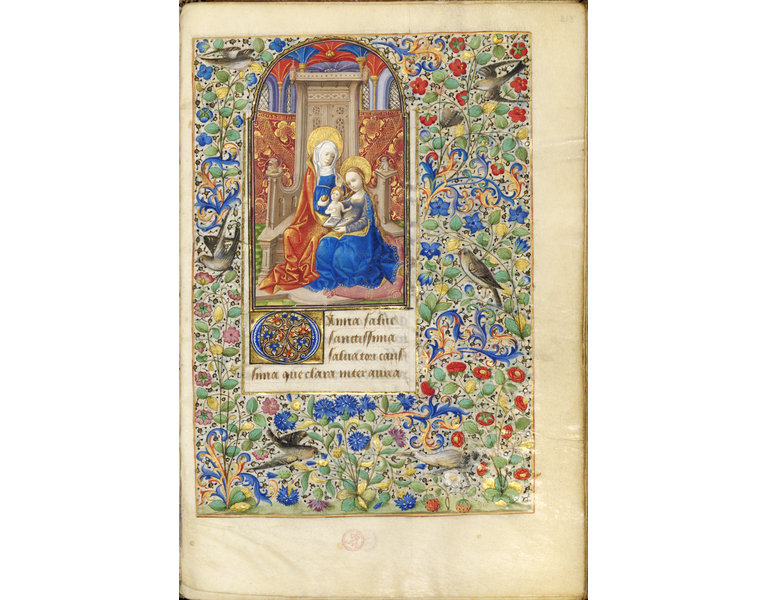

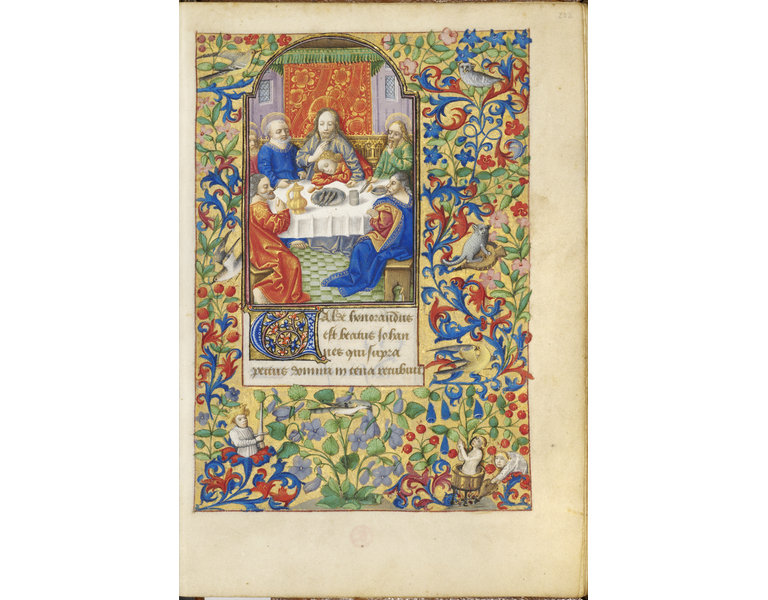

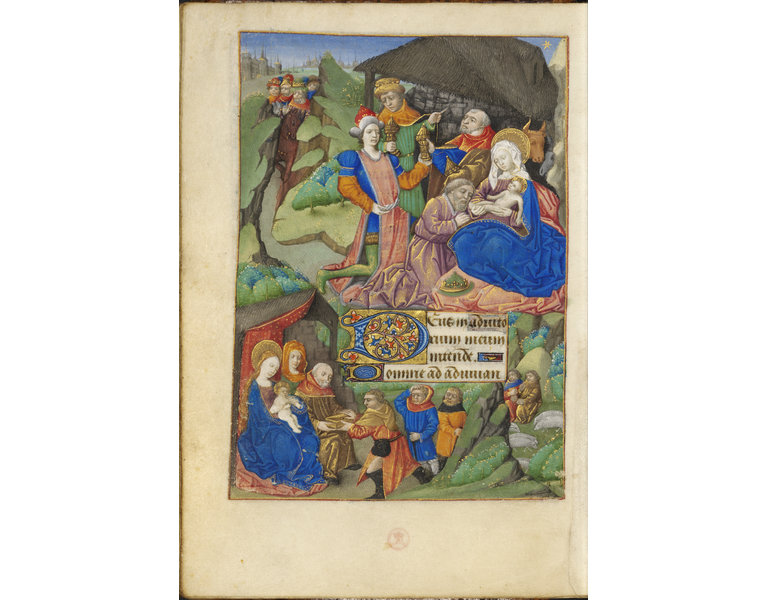

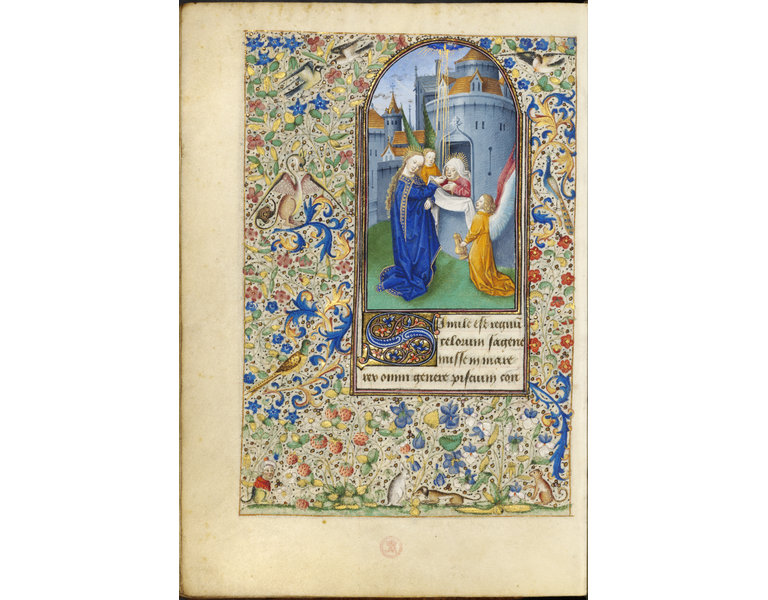

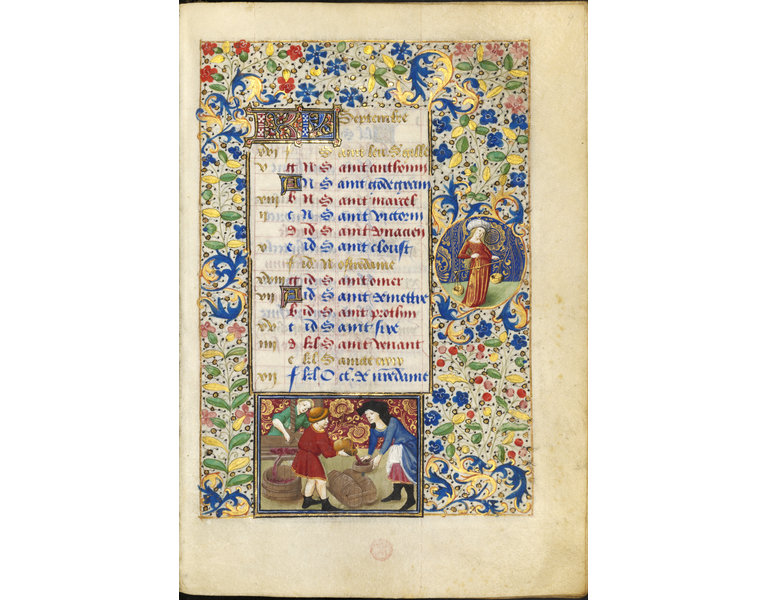

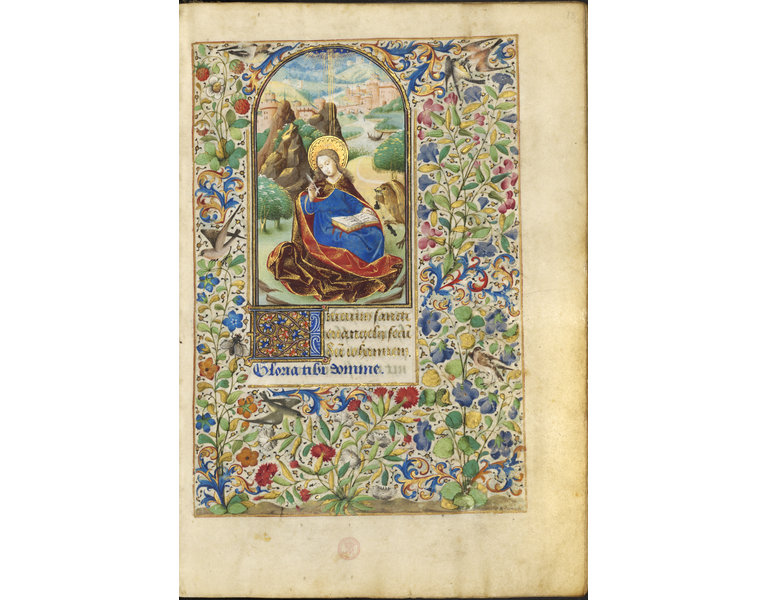
