= Jean Meschinot =

Breton poet (1420–1491)

Jean Meschinot (1420, Monnières, near Clisson – September 12, 1491) was a Breton poet who wrote in French at the court of the dukes of Brittany. His birthplace was in the Mortiers domain, around 30 km south of Nantes, capital of the duchy, and he came from the minor nobility. A squire of the ducal household under John VI, he was highly favoured under dukes Peter II and Arthur III, composing rondeaus and ballades. Just as he was about to become 'official poet' he came into disfavour with duke Francis II. Historian Johann Huizinga quotes a ballad of his indicting King Louis XI for crimes against France: "You have sinned against peace..."

He was maître d’hôtel to the young Anne of Brittany from 1488 onwards, dying before her marriage and Brittany's merger into France.
