= Anne of Brittany =

Queen of France (1491–1498; 1499–1514), Duchess of Brittany (1488–1514)

Anne
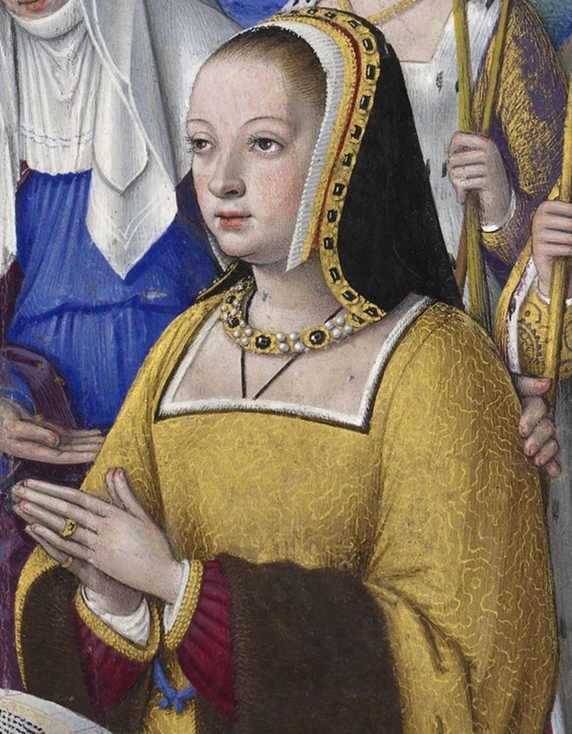
- Miniature depiction in the Grandes Heures of Anne of Brittany, by Jean Bourdichon (c. 1503–1508)

Duchess of Brittany
- Reign: 9 September 1488 – 9 January 1514
- Enthronement: 10 February 1489
- Predecessor: Francis II
- Successor: Claude

Queen consort of the Romans
- Tenure: 19 December 1490 – 15 February 1492

Queen consort of France
- Tenure: 6 December 1491 – 7 April 1498
- Coronation: 8 February 1492
- Tenure: 8 January 1499 – 9 January 1514
- Coronation: 18 November 1504

Queen consort of Naples
- Tenure: 2 August 1501 – 31 January 1504
- Born: 25/26 January 1477; Nantes, Duchy of Brittany, Kingdom of France
- Died: 9 January 1514 (aged 36); Blois, Kingdom of France
- Burial: 15 February 1514; Saint Denis Basilica
- Spouses: Maximilian I, King of the Romans (later Holy Roman Emperor) (m. 1490; ann. 1492) Charles VIII of France (m. 1491; died 1498) Louis XII of France (m. 1499)
- Issue Detail: Charles Orlando, Dauphin of France; Claude, Queen of France; Renée, Duchess of Ferrara
- House: Montfort-Brittany
- Father: Francis II, Duke of Brittany
- Mother: Margaret of Foix
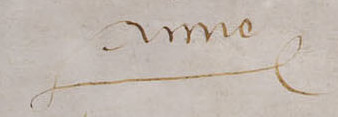
- Signature

Anne of Brittany (Breton: Anna; 25/26 January 1477 – 9 January 1514) was suo jure Duchess of Brittany from 1488 until her death, and Queen of France from 1491 to 1498 and again from 1499 to her death. She was the only woman to have been queen consort of France twice.

Anne was raised in Nantes during a series of conflicts in which the King of France sought to assert his suzerainty over Brittany. Her father, Francis II, Duke of Brittany, was the last male heir of the House of Montfort. Upon his death in 1488, Anne became duchess of Brittany, countess of Nantes, Montfort, and Richmond, and viscountess of Limoges. She was only 11 at that time, but she was already considered a desirable prospect for marriage because of Brittany's strategic position. The next year, she married Maximilian I of Austria by proxy, but Charles VIII of France saw this as a threat since his realm was located between Brittany and Austria. He started a military campaign which eventually forced the duchess to renounce her marriage.

Anne eventually married Charles VIII in 1491. None of their children survived early childhood, and when the king died in 1498, the throne went to his cousin, Louis XII. Following an agreement made to secure the annexation of Brittany, Anne had to marry the new king. Louis XII was deeply in love with his wife and Anne had many opportunities to reassert the independence of her duchy. They had two daughters — although neither could succeed to the French throne due to the Salic law, the elder was proclaimed the heiress of Brittany. Anne managed to have her elder daughter engaged to Charles of Austria, grandchild of Maximilian I, but after Anne's death in 1514, her daughter married her cousin Francis I of France. This marriage later led to the formal union between France and Brittany.

Anne was highly regarded in Brittany as a conscientious ruler who defended the duchy against France. In the Romantic period, she became a figure of Breton patriotism and she was honoured with many memorials and statues. Her artistic legacy is important in the Loire Valley, where she spent most of her life. She was notably responsible, with her husbands, for architectural projects in the châteaux of Blois and Amboise.

== Life ==
=== Early years and education ===
Anne was born on 25 or 26 January 1477 in the Castle of the Dukes of Brittany in the city of Nantes in what is now the Loire-Atlantique département of France, as the eldest child of Duke Francis II of Brittany and his second wife Margaret of Foix, Infanta of Navarre. The next year, in 1478, her parents had a second daughter, Isabeau. Her mother died when Anne was nine, while her father died when Anne was eleven years old.

It is likely that she learned to read and write in French, and perhaps a little Latin. Contrary to what is sometimes claimed, it was unlikely that she learned Greek or Hebrew and never spoke or understood the Breton language. She was raised by a governess, Françoise de Dinan, Lady of Chateaubriant and by marriage Countess of Laval. In addition, she had several tutors, including her butler and court poet, Jean Meschinot, who is thought to have taught her dancing, singing and music.

=== Heiress of Brittany ===
In this period, the law of succession was unclear, but prior to the Breton War of Succession mainly operated according to semi-Salic Law; i.e., noble women could inherit, but only if the male line had died out. The Treaty of Guérande in 1365, however, stated that in the absence of a male heir from the House of Montfort, the heirs of Joanna of Penthièvre would succeed. By the time Anne was born, her father was the only man of from the Breton House of Montfort-Brittany, and the Blois-Penthièvre heir was a woman, Nicole of Blois, who in 1480 sold her rights over Brittany to King Louis XI of France for the amount of 50,000 écus.

The lack of a male heir gave rise to the threat of a dynastic crisis in the Duchy, or to its passing directly into the royal domain. To avoid this, Francis II had Anne officially recognised as his heiress by the Estates of Brittany on 10 February 1486; however, the question of her marriage remained a diplomatic issue.

=== Betrothals ===
Being the eldest surviving child and heiress of the Duchy of Brittany, Anne was, above all, the instrument of her father's political maneuvering. Francis II indeed promised his daughter to various French or foreign princes in order to obtain military and financial aid, and to strengthen his position against the King of France. The prospect for these princes to add the duchy to their domain thus allowed the Duke of Brittany to initiate several marriage negotiations and to forge various secret alliances which accompanied these matrimonial projects. Anne became the stake of these rival ambitions, and her father, reassured by the signing of these alliances, could afford to refuse various marriage projects and contracts. (Note: At the time, such matrimonial projects only materialized after long political calculations and lengthy negotiations; royal or noble intended brides or grooms were sometimes not even born at the time of their betrothal. These projects could, therefore, vary at the rate of political vagaries, and many of them did not succeed.) These political calculations thus led to Anne's engagement with different European princes:

- In 1480 she was officially promised in marriage to Edward, Prince of Wales, son of Edward IV of England; however, soon after the death of Edward IV in 1483, the boy disappeared, presumed to have been killed – possibly on the orders of his regent, Richard III.
- Henry Tudor, the future King Henry VII of England, last male representative of the Lancaster branch, then in exile in Brittany showed interest in being a suitor for Anne's hand, but this marriage did not interest her father.
- Maximilian, King of the Romans and Archduke of Austria, widower of Mary of Burgundy, daughter and heiress of Charles the Bold.
- Alain I of Albret, son of Catherine of Rohan and Jean I of Albret. Through his mother, he was a great-grandson of Duke John V of Brittany, and thus a possible heir. Although he was an ally of Duke Francis II, Anne refused to marry him because she found him repulsive. Before the papal court, convened by Marshal Rieux, a proponent of Albret's suit, to give the couple a dispensation to marry, Anne declared that she had only entertained his offer of marriage due to "l'obéissance, crainte & révérence" [the obedience, fear, and reverence] due to her father, and that she herself did not want it.
- Louis, Duke of Orléans, cousin of King Charles VIII and in turn future King, was another aspirant for her hand, despite being already married to the King's sister Joan.
- John IV of Chalon-Arlay, Prince of Orange. A grandson of Richard, Count of Étampes, and nephew of Francis II, he was in line to the throne after Anne and Isabeau.
- Edward Stafford, 3rd Duke of Buckingham. In 1488 Henry VII had suggested a marriage between Buckingham and Anne, but in December 1489 the executors of Henry Percy, 4th Earl of Northumberland, paid the King £4000 for Buckingham's marriage to Percy's eldest daughter Eleanor.
- Viscount John II of Rohan, also in line to the Breton Ducal throne, offered with the support of Marshal Jean IV de Rieux a double marriage of his sons François and Jean with Anne and her sister Isabeau, but Francis II opposed this plan.

=== Marriages ===
In 1488, Francis II was defeated at the Battle of Saint-Aubin-du-Cormier, ending the Mad War (la Guerre Folle) between Brittany and France. In the Treaty of Sablé (19 August 1488), which concluded the peace settlement, the Duke was forced to accept clauses stipulating that his daughters were not to marry without the approval of the King of France.

With the death of Francis II soon afterwards (9 September 1488) as a result of a fall from his horse, Brittany was plunged into a fresh crisis, leading to the final Franco-Breton war. On his deathbed, the Duke made his daughter promise never to consent to the subjugation of the Duchy to the Kingdom of France. Before he died, Francis II appointed the Marshal of Rieux guardian of his daughter.

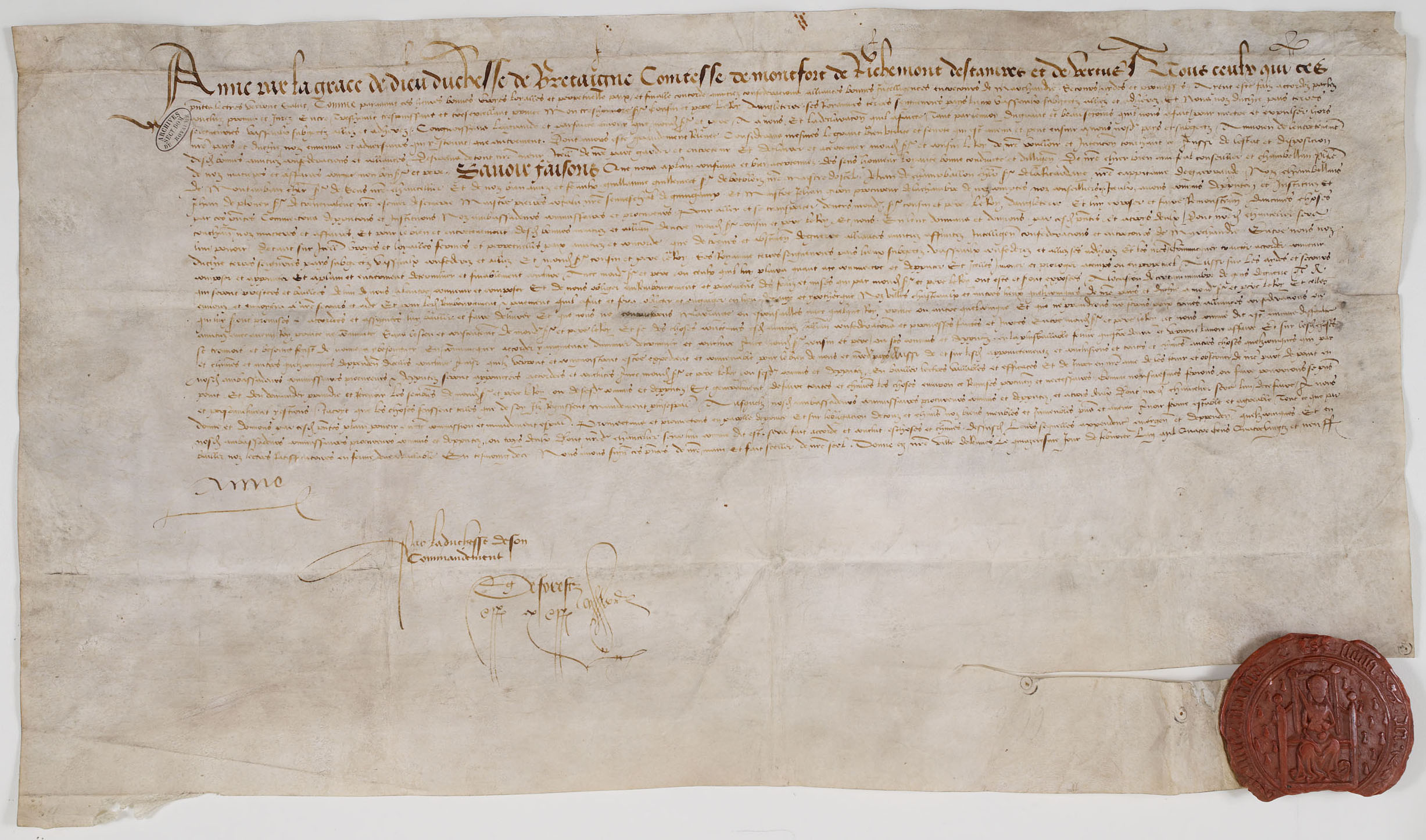
Treaty made signed on Anne's behalf with the Kingdom of England on 15 February 1490. The signing is autograph and also contains the personal seal of the Duchess. Archives nationales, France, AE/II/525.

After fleeing Nantes following the division of her advisors over the issue of her marriage, Anne was crowned Duchess of Brittany in Rennes on 10 February 1489. Slightly over a year later, on 10 June 1490, Anne's sister and heir, Isabeau, died of pneumonia at age 11/12. At the age of thirteen, on 19 December 1490, Anne was married by proxy to Maximilian I of Austria at Rennes Cathedral. This conferred upon her the title Queen of the Romans. The French regarded it as a serious provocation – it not only violated the Treaty of Sablé (the King of France not having consented to the marriage), but also reintroduced an enemy of the French as ruler of Brittany, which they had wanted to avoid during the 14th and 15th centuries. The marriage also proved ill-timed: the Habsburgs were too busy in Hungary to pay any serious attention to Brittany, and the Castilians were busy fighting in Granada.

Although both Castile and England sent small numbers of troops to supplement the Ducal army, neither wished for open warfare with France. The spring of 1491 brought new successes by the French general La Trémoille (the previous victor of the Battle of Saint-Aubin-du-Cormier), and King Charles VIII of France came to lay siege to Rennes, where Anne stayed, to force her to desist from her Habsburg marriage. Aided by troops from England, the Holy Roman Empire, and the crowns of Aragon and Castile, Rennes lasted through two months of Charles's siege before falling.

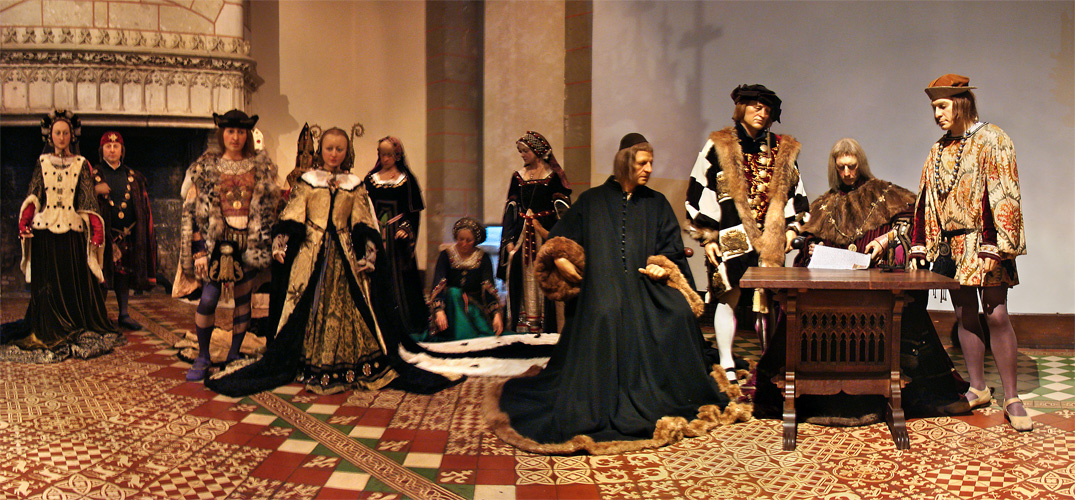
Waxwork reenactment from the marriage of Duchess Anne of Brittany and King Charles VIII of France in the "marriage hall" of the Château de Langeais. (Note: Those present and showed are from left to right: <according to Madame Amèlie Delaunay of the Chateau Staff>: Princess-Regent & Duchess Anne de Beaujeu [aged 31 at the time of the marriage and also referred-to as "Madame La Grande" by her contemporaries], and her husband and co-Regent, the Sire De Beaujeu – Pierre II, Duc de Bourbon; then King Charles VIII [aged 21] and Duchess Anne [aged 14]. Behind the Royal Couple, Bishop Louis D'Amboise [in the white Mitre] and Charles, Cardinal D'Amboise, the King's Minister of State [think "Prime Minister"], wearing the cloth-of-gold mitre. The lady kneeling to arrange Duchess Anne's train is a likeness of her Chaperone-Teacher-Companion, Madame Françoise de Dinan, the Lady of Chateaubriant and Laval. Two Breton ladies-in-waiting are mentioned as being present by Bishop D'Amboise in his report to the Pope, but were unnamed. Around the table, recreating the final reading of the Marriage Contract before Charles VIII and Anne sign it, are: the Notary-Public of Tours, seated; Duke Louis of Orléans (the future Louis XII), standing; Chancellor Guillaume of Rochefort, seated; and the Prince of Orange, standing. All the likenesses are the best that could be achieved by the Forensic Reconstruction Sculptors commissioned by the Institut de France for the 500th Anniversary of the marriage, in 1991.)

Charles VIII entered the city on 15 November, and both parties signed the Treaty of Rennes, ending the fourth military campaign of the French over Brittany. After refusing all proposed marriages with French princes, Anne became engaged to the King on 17 November 1491, in the vault of the Jacobins in Rennes. Then, escorted by her army (ostensibly to show that she had willingly consented to the marriage), Anne went to Langeais to be married. Austria made diplomatic protests (especially before the Holy See), claiming that the marriage was illegal because the bride was unwilling, that she was already legally married to Maximilian, and that Charles VIII was legally betrothed to Margaret of Austria, Maximilian's daughter.

The official marriage between Anne and King Charles VIII of France was celebrated in the Great Hall of the Château de Langeais on 6 December 1491 at dawn. The ceremony was concluded discreetly and urgently because it was technically illegal until Pope Innocent VIII, in exchange for substantial concessions, validated the union on 15 February 1492, by granting the annulment of the marriage by proxy with Maximilian, and also giving a dispensation for the marriage with Charles VIII, needed because the King and Anne were related in the forbidden fourth degree of consanguinity. The marriage contract provided that the spouse who outlived the other would retain possession of Brittany; however, it also stipulated that if Charles VIII died without male heirs, Anne would marry his successor, thus ensuring the French kings a second chance to annex Brittany permanently.

=== Queen of Charles VIII ===
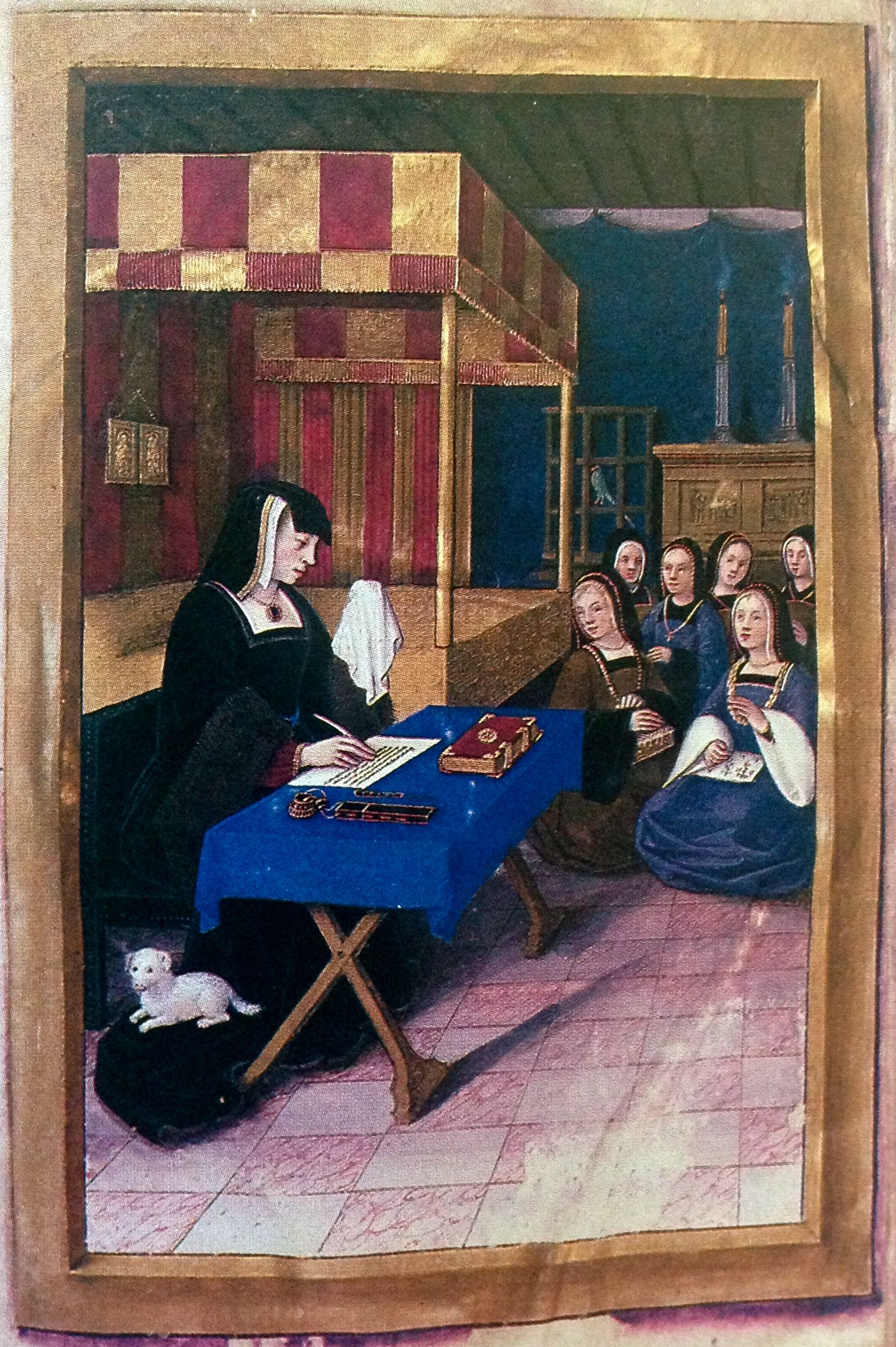
Miniature representing Anne writing to her absent husband, 1509, Épîtres de poètes royaux.

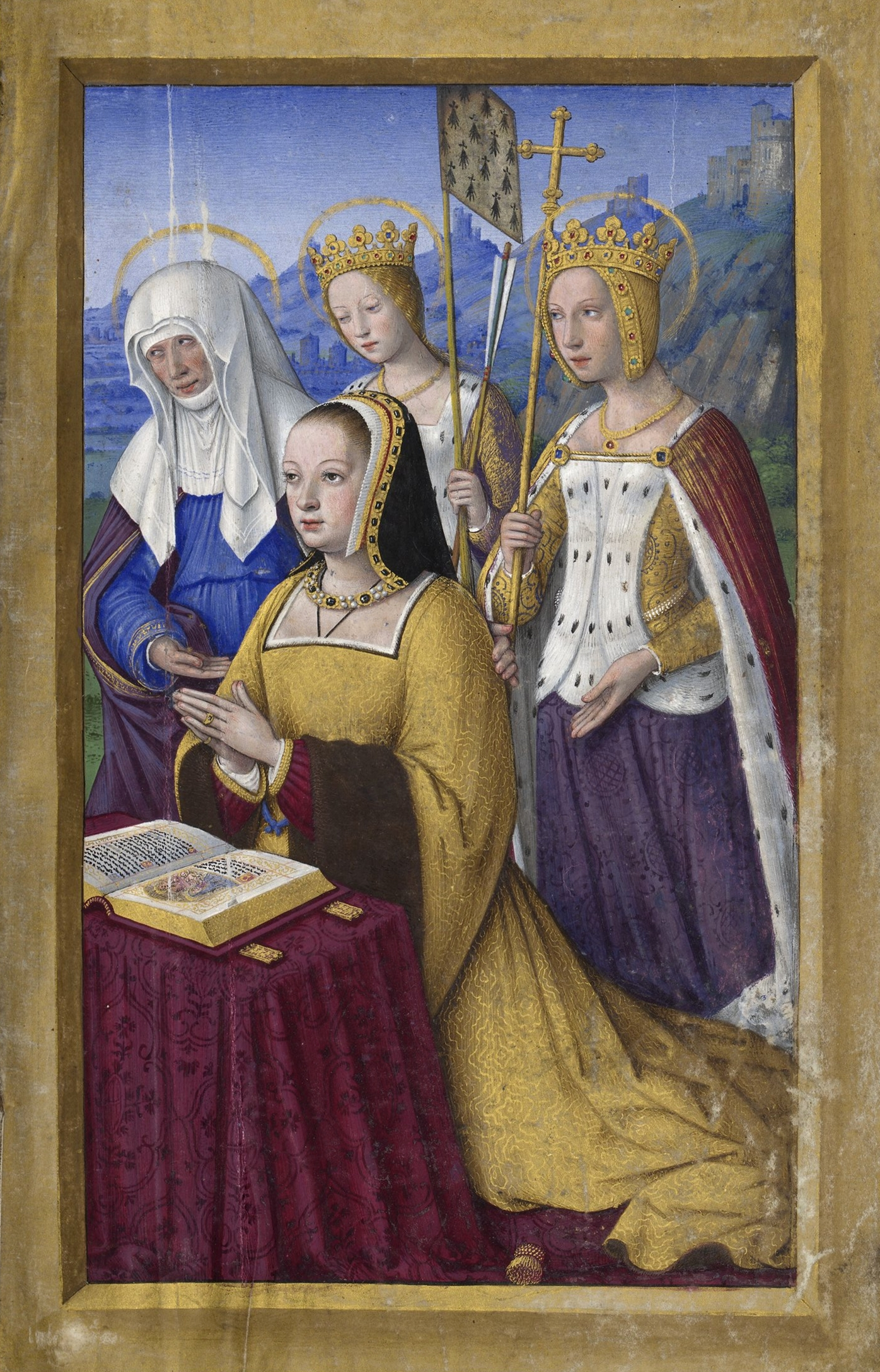
Queen Anne in prayer. Miniature from the Grandes Heures d'Anne de Bretagne (c. 1503–1508).

By the marriage of 1491, Anne of Brittany became Queen consort of France. Her marriage contract stated that it was concluded to ensure peace between the Duchy of Brittany and the Kingdom of France. She made Charles VIII her perpetual representative. On 8 February 1492, Anne was crowned Queen of France at St. Denis Basilica. She was the first Queen crowned there and consecrated, "anointed in the head and chest" by André d'Espinay, Archbishop of Bordeaux. Her husband forbade her to use the title of Duchess of Brittany, which became a bone of contention between the two. Gabriel Miron became the Chancellor of the Queen and her first doctor; he signed the marriage contract of the Queen with King Louis XII on 1 January 1499.

Anne's marriage began badly: she brought two beds with her when she came to marry Charles, and the King and Queen often lived apart; despite this, she was pregnant for most of her married life (with a child every fourteen months on average). When her husband fought in the wars in Italy, the regency powers were exercised by his sister Anne of Beaujeu, who had held this position between 1483 and 1491. Anne of Brittany had a limited role in France and Brittany and sometimes had to accept being separated from her children in infancy. She lived primarily in the royal castles of Amboise, Loches and Plessis or in the towns of Lyon, Grenoble or Moulins (when the king was in Italy). At Amboise, when Charles VIII had work, she mainly resided in the nearby Clos Lucé, the future home of Leonardo da Vinci. She built her chapel.

She became Queen Consort of Naples and Jerusalem during the conquest of Naples by Louis XII in 1501.

=== Duchess of Brittany and remarriage ===
When Charles VIII died as the result of an accident on 4 April 1498, Anne was 21 years old and without surviving children. She then personally took charge of the administration of the Duchy of Brittany. She restored the faithful Philippe de Montauban to the chancellery of Brittany, named Jean de Châlon, Prince of Orange, as Hereditary Lieutenant General of Brittany, appointed her squire Gilles of Texue as responsible of the Château de Brest, convened the Estates of Brittany, and ordered production of a gold coin bearing her name.

Around her, there was a famous circle of court poets, among them the Italian humanist Publio Fausto Andrelini from Forlì (who spread the New Learning in France), historian Jean Lemaire de Belges and poet Jean Marot. She also took into her service the most famous musicians of her time: Johannes Ockeghem, Antoine de Févin, Loyset Compère and Jean Mouton. Anne of Brittany was undoubtedly the first Queen of France to appear as a patron sought after by artists and writers of her time.

Three days after her husband's death, the terms of her marriage contract came into force; however, the new King, Louis XII, was already married to Joan, daughter of Louis XI and sister to Charles VIII. On 19 August 1498, at Étampes, Anne agreed to marry Louis XII if he obtained an annulment from Joan within a year. Days later, the process for the annulment of the marriage between Louis XII and Joan of France began. In the interim, Anne returned to Brittany in October 1498.

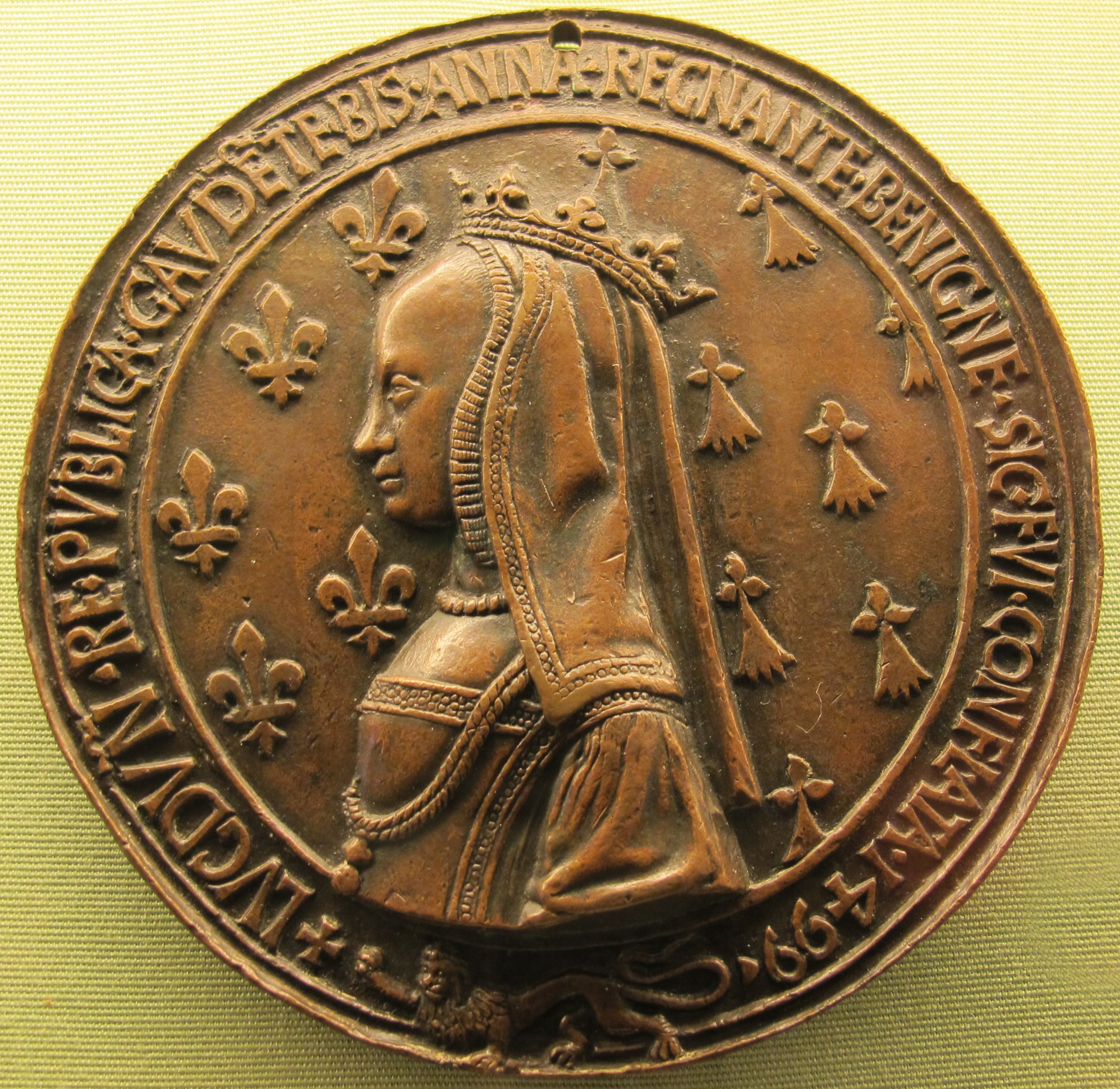
Medal of Queen Anne made in celebration of her stay at Lyon in 1499.

=== Queen of Louis XII ===
If Anne was gambling that the annulment would be denied, she lost: Louis's first marriage was dissolved by Pope Alexander VI before the end of the year. Anne's third marriage contract, signed the day of her marriage (Nantes, 7 January 1499), was concluded under conditions radically different from those of the second. She was no longer a child, but a Dowager Queen, and determined to ensure the recognition of her rights as sovereign Duchess from that point forward. Although her new husband exercised the ruler's powers in Brittany, he formally recognized her right to the title "Duchess of Brittany" and issued decisions in her name. The contract also stipulated that, since Anne personally retained rights to the duchy, the couple's second child, son or daughter, would be Anne's own heir, thus keeping the duchy separate from the throne of France. This clause would not be respected. Anne's second coronation ceremony as Louis XII's consort took place on 18 November 1504, again at St. Denis Basilica.

Anne lived mainly at the Château de Blois, where the presence of the Duchess of Brittany was visible everywhere. She built the tomb of her parents at Nantes Cathedral (where her heart would also return under the terms of her last will) with the symbols of the four virtues: Courage, Temperance, Justice and Prudence, that she always tried to wear. All Italian arts were appreciated by the Queen. During an illness of Louis XII she made a tour of Brittany (not the Tro Breizh, contrary to what is often said).

As Duchess, Anne fiercely defended the independence of her Duchy. She arranged the marriage of her daughter, Claude, heiress of the Duchy, to Charles of Austria. This match would reinforce the Franco-Spanish alliance and ensure French success in the Italian Wars. The marriage contract was signed on 10 August 1501 in Lyon by François de Busleyden, Archbishop of Besançon, William de Croÿ, Nicolas de Rutter and Pierre Lesseman, all ambassadors of Duke Philip of Burgundy, Charles' father. Louis XII assented to this plan publicly, but in private worked to match Claude with the heir to the French throne, Francis of Angoulême. Every time Louis' precarious health threatened his death, steps were taken to cement this match between Claude and Francis. Anne, determined to maintain Breton independence, refused to sanction the marriage until her death, pushing instead for Claude to marry Charles, or for her other daughter, Renée, to inherit the Duchy. When Louis XII definitively settled their daughters' dispositions counter to her wishes, Anne left his side to tour the Duchy, visiting many places she had never been able to see as a child. Officially, it was a pilgrimage to the Breton shrines in thanks for one of Louis' recent recoveries, but in reality it was a political journey: an act of independence that sought to assert her sovereignty within the marriage. Letters imply how much Louis took her absence to heart: according to a July letter from Louise of Savoy to Michelle de Saubonne, Louis "could not be more anxious" for Anne's return and "is as wretched as can be without her." By September, he is reported as asking about her return at least six times a day. From June to September 1505, she made triumphal entries into the cities of the Duchy, where her vassals received her sumptuously. In addition, she ensured the proper collection of taxes.

== Death ==
Exhausted by many pregnancies and miscarriages, Anne died of a kidney-stone attack in the Château de Blois at 6 a.m. on 9 January 1514, after having dictated in her will the customary partition of her body (dilaceratio corporis, "division of the body" in heart, entrails and bones) with multiple burials, a privilege of the Capetian dynasty, which allowed for multiple ceremonies (funerals of the body – the most important – and heart) and places (the burial of the body and heart). Anne's will also conferred the succession of Brittany upon her second daughter, Renée. Her husband ignored this, confirmed Claude as Duchess, put her under the guardianship of Anne's political rival, Louise of Savoy, and married her to Francis, Louise's son, in the year following Anne's death. When Francis became king in 1515, the Duchy of Brittany was once again the property of the queen consort of France.

She was buried in the necropolis of Saint Denis. Her funeral was exceptionally long, lasting 40 days. The Herald of arms of Brittany Pierre Choqué pronounced for the first time the traditional lament: La reine est morte!, la reine est morte!, la reine est morte! (The Queen is dead!, The Queen is dead!, The Queen is dead!). Choqué, in his record of Anne's funeral commissioned by Louis XII, Récit des Funérailles d'Anne de Bretagne, recorded that two Masses were read, the first by the Cordeliers (i.e., Franciscans) and the second by the Jacobins (i.e., Dominicans). Two requiems were also sung, possibly those that survive by Johannes Prioris and Antoine de Févin. Separate mourning motets by other members of the two royal choirs also survive: Quis dabit oculis by Costanzo Festa and Fiere attropos by Pierre Moulu.

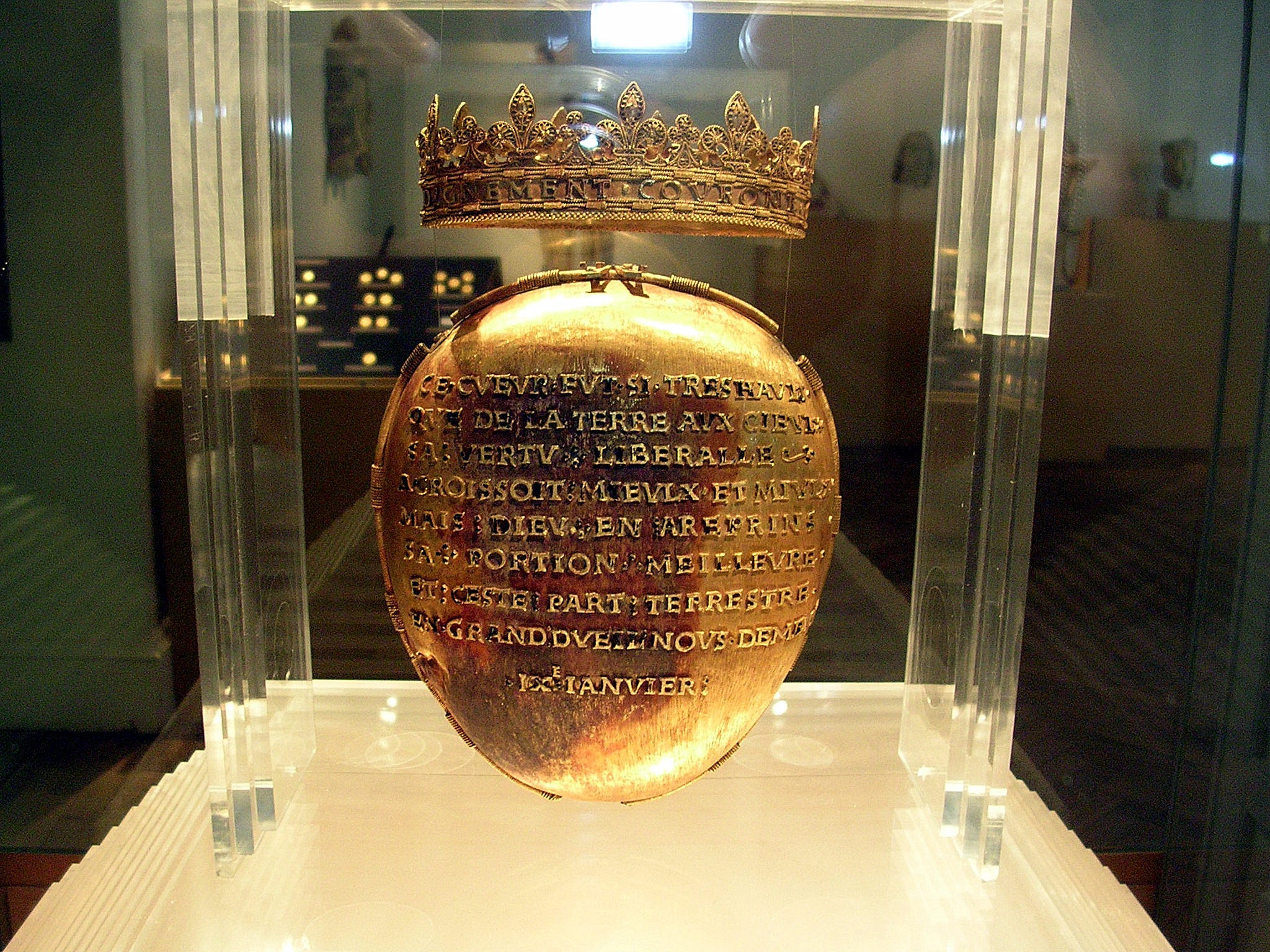
Reliquary of Anne of Brittany's heart

In accordance to her will, Anne's heart was placed in a raised enamel gold reliquary before it was transported to Nantes to be deposited in her parents' tomb in the chapel of the Carmelite friars. This was done on 19 March 1514, but it was later transferred to the Saint-Pierre Cathedral. Anne's reliquary is a bivalvular box oval articulated by a hinge, made of a sheet of gold pushed back and guillochéd, broadside of a gold cordelière and topped by a crown of lily and clover. It is inscribed on the obverse as follows:

En ce petit vaisseau
De fin or pur et munde
Repose ung plus grand cueur
Que oncque dame eut au munde

Anne fut le nom delle
En France deux fois royne
Duchesse des Bretons
Royale et Souveraine.

Translation:

In this little vessel
of fine gold,
pure and clean,
rests a heart greater
than any lady in the world ever had.

Anne was her name,
twice queen in France,
Duchess of the Bretons,
royal and sovereign.

It was made by anonymous goldsmiths of the court of Blois, and has been attributed to Geoffroy Jacquet and Pierre Mangot working to the designs of Jean Perréal. In 1792, by order of the National Convention, the reliquary was disinterred and emptied as part of the collection of precious metals belonging to churches. It was sent to Paris to be melted down, but was kept instead in the National Library. It was returned to Nantes in 1819 and kept in various museums; it has been in the Dobrée Museum since 1896. This relic was stolen 13 April 2018 from the Thomas-Dobree museum in Nantes, France. It was recovered undamaged later that month.

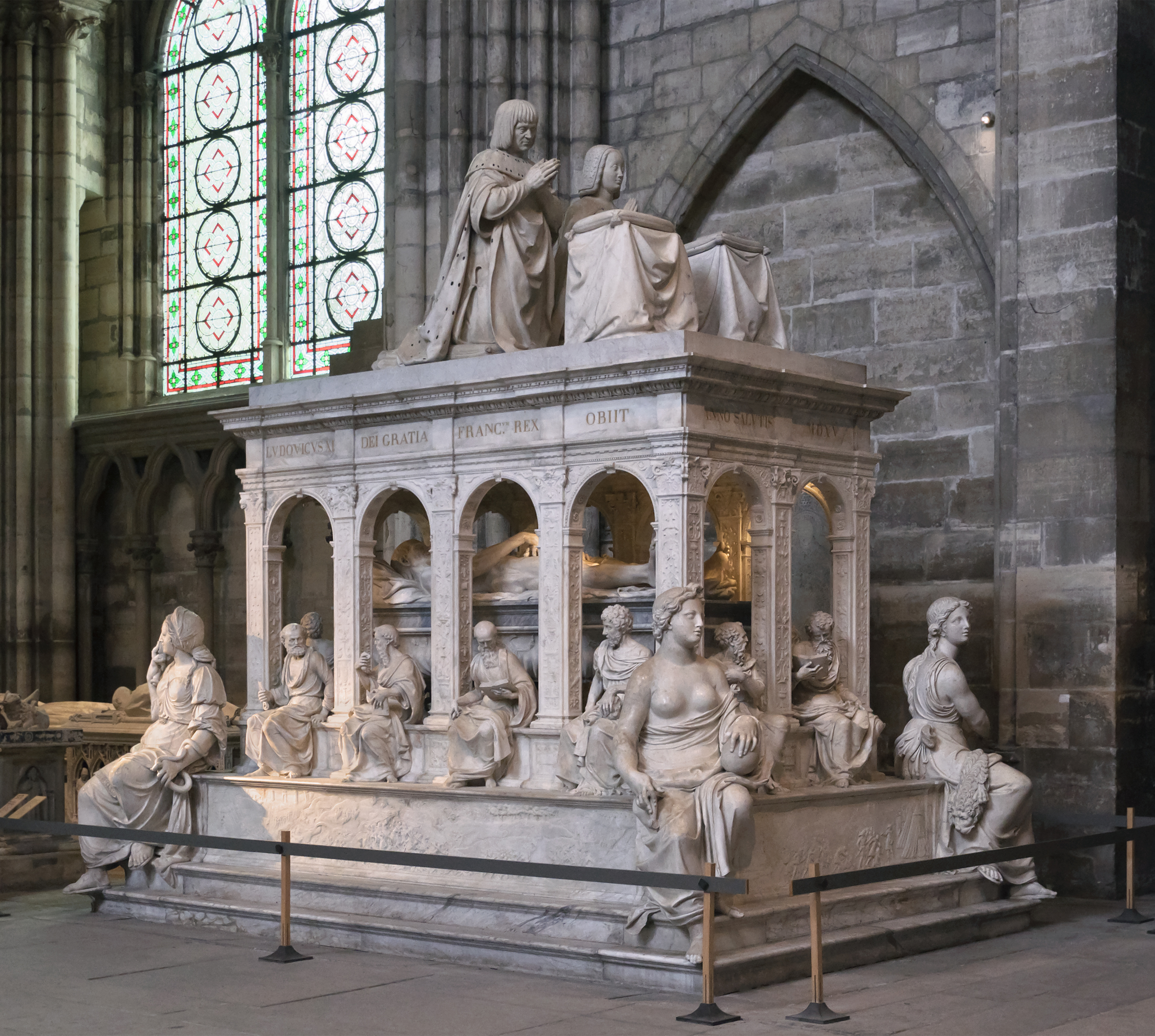
The Tomb of Louis XII and Anne of Brittany in the Saint-Denis Basilica

The double mausoleum Louis XII and Anne of Brittany, carved in Carrara marble, was unveiled at Saint Denis Basilica in 1531. The baldachin was in arcades, while the base of the sarcophagus depicted the victories of Louis XII (Battle of Agnadello, the triumphal entry into Milan), statues of the Twelve Apostles and the four Cardinal virtues, the work of the Juste brothers, Italian sculptors who received the order in 1515. The transi (whose realism was so shocking that it included an open abdomen stitched after the extraction of the entrails) and orans before a Prie-dieu crowning the platform are attributed to Guillaume Regnault. The tomb was desecrated during the Revolution on 18 October 1793 and the bodies were thrown into a mass grave. Alexandre Lenoir saved much of the monument, which was preserved in the Museum of French Monuments in 1795 before being returned to the Royal Basilica under the Second Bourbon Restoration.

== Personal characteristics ==
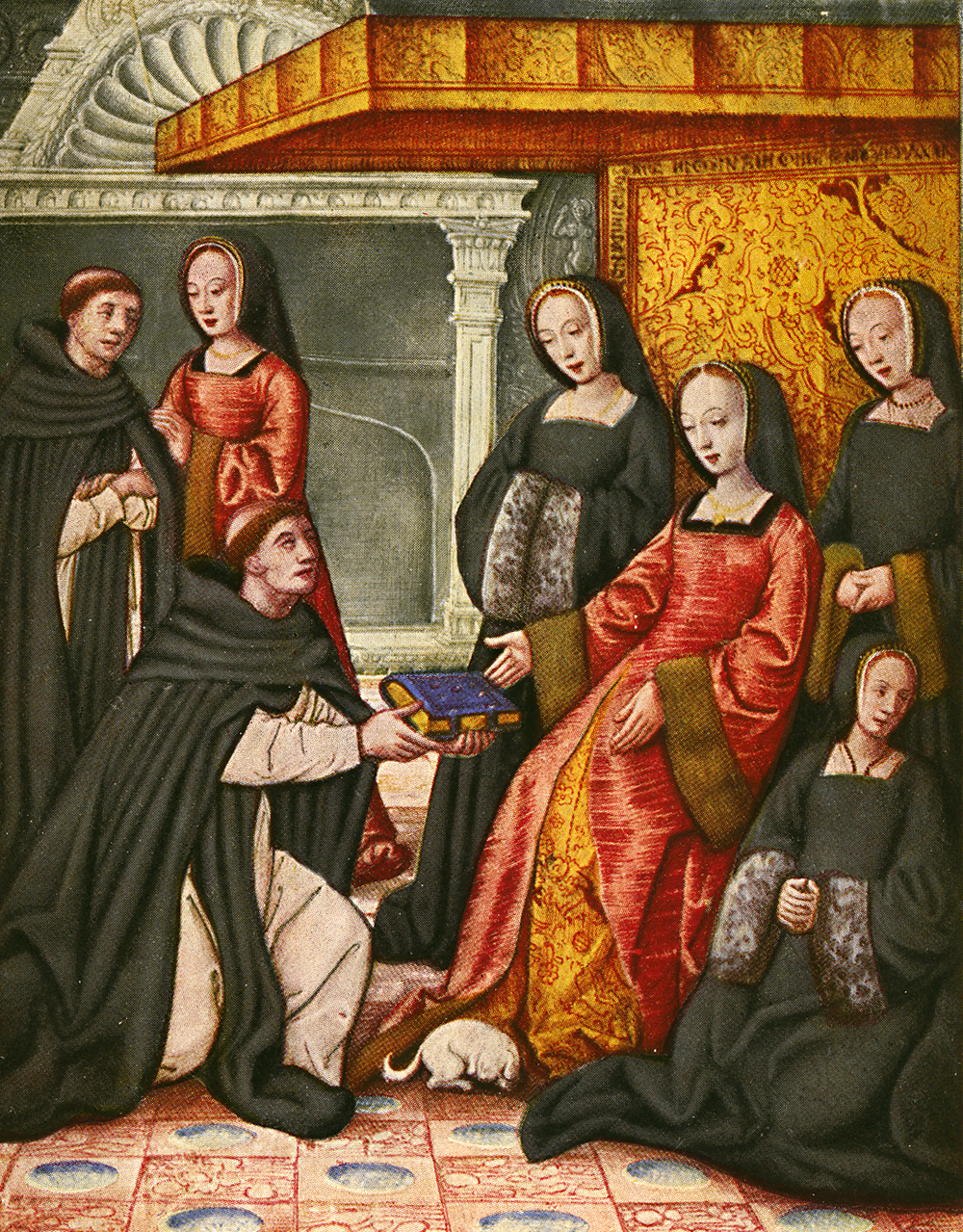
Anne as Queen, receives a book in praise of famous women, painted by Jean Perréal.

Anne was a highly intelligent woman who spent much of her time on the administration of Brittany. She was described as shrewd, proud and haughty in manner. She made the safeguarding of Breton autonomy, and the preservation of the Duchy outside the French crown, her life's work, although that goal would prove to have failed shortly after her death.

Anne was also a patron of the arts and enjoyed music. A prolific collector of tapestries, it is very likely that the unicorn tapestries now on view at The Cloisters museum in New York City were commissioned by her in celebration of her wedding to Louis XII. Of her four surviving illuminated manuscript books of hours the most famous is the Grandes Heures of Anne of Brittany. She also supported printed books and their authors, for example commissioning a more modern French version, for print, of Christine of Pizan's book The City of Ladies, of a century earlier.

She was a devoted mother, spending as much time as possible with her children. She commissioned a book of prayers for her son, Charles-Orland, to use in teaching him how to pray, and as guidance for his role as future King of France. Unfortunately, Charles-Orland died in 1495, and no other son lived more than a few weeks. She also commissioned a primer, yet extant, for her then 8-year-old daughter Claude. The prevalence of Anne's own coat of arms in the illumination, rather than Louis's, marks this book as a mechanism of transmission of values inter-generationally from mother to daughter, and from queen to queen. Claude, in turn, commissioned another such book for her younger sister, Renée, whom she raised after Anne's death. The contents of these books produced specifically for children – Latin, Biblical scenes, models of proper female behavior – give insight into the priorities of the Princesses' childhood education.

According to the memoirs of Brantôme, Anne greatly expanded her household and retinue at court, especially in respect to young girls, forming a kind of finishing school, and in having a company of 100 Breton gentlemen at court. These innovations influenced later French courts.

At her marriage to Charles VIII at age 14, Anne was described as a young and rosy-cheeked girl. By the time of her marriage to Louis, aged 22, after six pregnancies with no surviving children, she was described as pale-faced and wan. By the end of her life, at 36, she had been pregnant at least 11 times, from which only two children survived to adulthood.

Anne was trained from a young age to hide her limp, caused by a difference in the length of her legs, linked to a congenital displacement of her hips. She wore special heeled shoes to aid in smoothing her gait. She passed this limp on to her daughter, Claude.

== Issue ==
Her marriage with Charles VIII of France produced six documented pregnancies:

- Charles Orland, Dauphin of France (11 October 1492 – 16 December 1495). Her only healthy son, born when Anne was 15, he died of the measles when three years old. Buried at Tours Cathedral.
- Francis (August 1493). Anne had become pregnant in late 1492/early 1493, but travelled with her husband from castle to castle; she went into labour during a drive in the forest of Courcelles, and the child was premature and stillborn. Buried at Notre-Dame de Cléry. (Note: A letter dated at Orléans 14 August 1493 from Francesco della Casa to Pietro de' Medici records that the Queen "grossa di sette mesi" gave birth "in uno piccolo villaggio...Corsel" to "un figliuolo maschio". Balby de Vernon suggests that the child "a sûrement été enterré à Cléry" where a small child's coffin was found.)
- Stillborn daughter (March 1495). She had become pregnant again in late 1494, but lost the child soon after. (Note: Marino Sanuto the Younger records that Charles VIII received news in Naples in March 1495 that the queen had given birth to a daughter.)
- Charles, Dauphin of France (8 September 1496 – 2 October 1496). His death prompted Anne to withdraw temporarily to Moulins in despair. Buried at Tours Cathedral.
- Francis, Dauphin of France (July 1497). He died several hours after his birth. Buried at Tours Cathedral.
- Anne of France (20 March 1498). She died on the day of her birth at Château de Plessis-lez-Tours. Buried at Tours Cathedral.

Her marriage with Louis XII of France, produced at least another five recorded pregnancies:

- Claude of France (13 October 1499 – 20 July 1524), who succeeded her as Duchess of Brittany and later also became Queen consort of France as wife of Francis I.
- Son ([late 1500/early 1501] – died young). (Note: Père Anselme records that in 1501 King Louis XII sent "le cardinal d'Amboise" to Trentino to negotiate a marriage between his son and one of the daughters of Philip I of Castile; however, he did not cite any primary source on which he bases this statement. If it is correct, the son in question must have been different from the one who was born 21 January [1503/07] who is shown below.)
- Stillborn son (21 January [1503/07]). (Note: The Journal de Louise de Savoie records that "Anne reine de France" gave birth at Blois 21 January to "un fils...il avoit faute de vie". The entry does not specify the year but follows an entry for 1502 and precedes one for 1507. Kerrebrouck dates the event to 1503 "à l'issue d'un voyage à Lyon" but does not specify the primary source on which he bases this information.)
- Renée of France (25 October 1510 – 12 June 1574), married Ercole II d'Este, Duke of Ferrara, and became Duchess of Chartres and Lady of Montargis on the occasion of her wedding.
- Stillborn son (January [1513]). (Note: Père Anselme records a second son "mort en bas âge", without dates or primary source citations. Kerrebrouck records a son "mort-né au château de Blois janvier 1512", commenting that "[la] grossesse [de la reine] tourne mal" after Pope Julius II excommunicated Louis XII for refusing to negotiate the liberation of the papal legate whom the French had captured after the Battle of Ravenna. As the battle happened took place on 11 April 1512, Kerrebrouck's date is presumably Old Style. This birth is not mentioned in the Journal de Louise de Savoie.)

Each miscarriage or stillbirth is said to have delighted the ambitious Louise of Savoy, whose son Francis was the heir presumptive under the Salic law. There even existed contemporary rumours that Louise used witchcraft to kill Anne's sons.

Through her granddaughter Margaret, Duchess of Savoy (Claude's youngest daughter), Anne of Brittany was the ancestor of Emanuele Filiberto, Prince of Venice, head of the House of Savoy and the current pretender to the throne of Italy. Through her great-granddaughter Claude, Duchess of Lorraine (daughter of Henry II of France), Anne is also the ancestor of Karl von Habsburg, the current head of the House of Habsburg-Lorraine.

Through her granddaughter Anna d'Este (Renée's eldest daughter), Anne of Brittany is also the ancestor of the House of Guise and Savoy-Nemours.

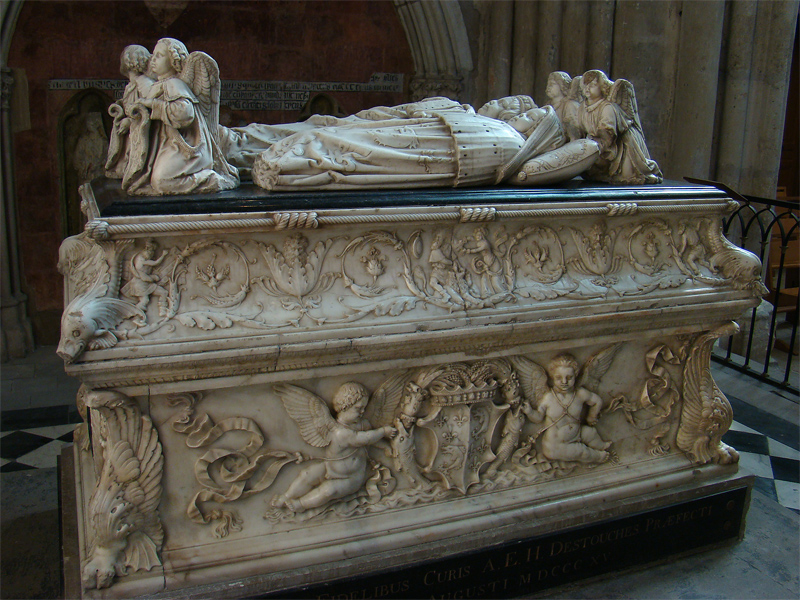
Tomb of Charles Orland and Charles, two sons of Anne and Charles VIII at Tours Cathedral.

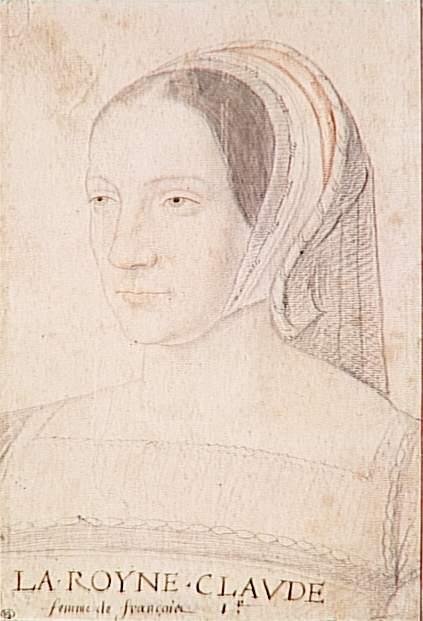
Queen Claude of France

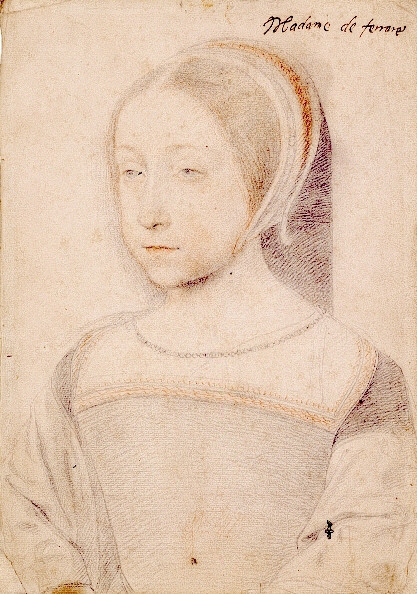
Duchess Renée of France

Coat of Arms of the House of Guise

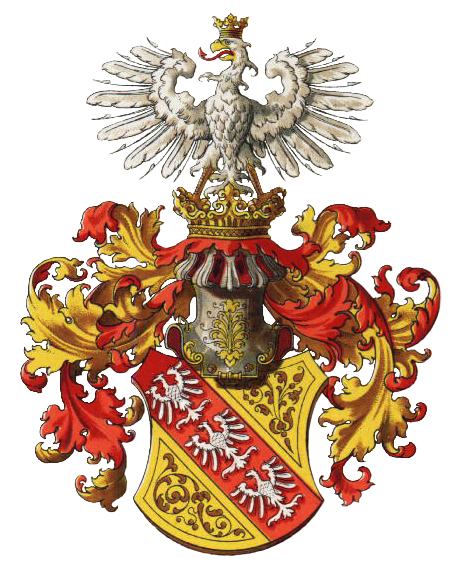
Coat of arms of the House of Habsburg-Lorraine

Coat of arms of the House of Savoy

== Emblems and mottos ==
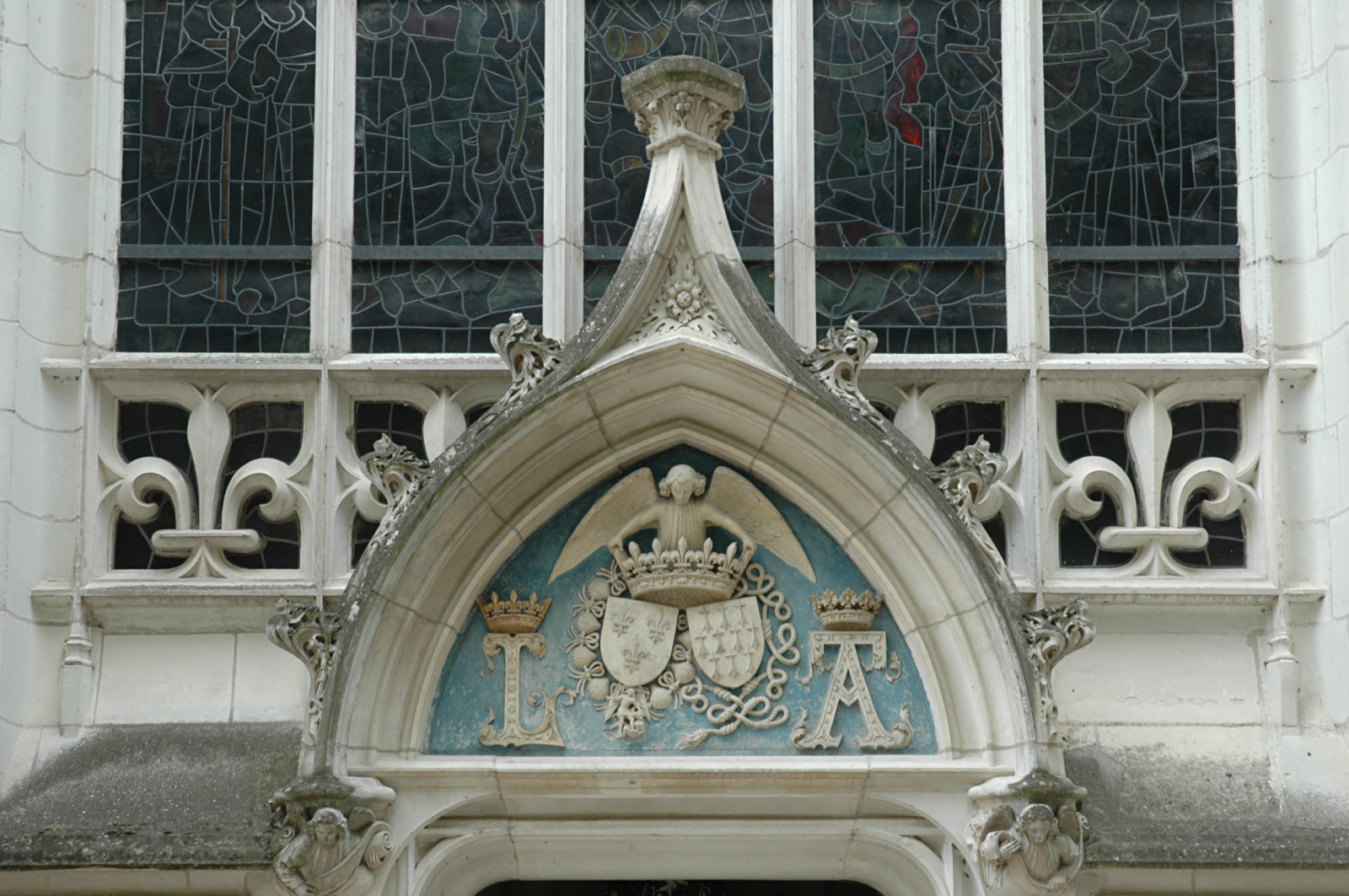
Château de Blois, gable of the chapel's entrance. There are shown crowned initials of Louis XII and Anne with their arms surrounded by the Orders of Saint Michael and the Cord.

Coat of Arms of Anne of Brittany: the arms of her husband (Fleur-de-lis) to the left, and the arms of her father (Ermine tails) to the right.

Anne had inherited from her predecessors the Breton dynastic emblems: a bandwidth Ermine (from John V), a simple Ermine (from John III) and a cord (from Francis II). As a widow of Charles VIII, and inspired by her father, she founded in 1498 the Order of the Ladies of the Cord.

As a personal emblem, she also used the letter "A" crowned, with the motto Non mudera ("I will not change") and a particular form of the father's cord, knotted at 8. Her emblems were joined in the decoration of her castles and manuscripts with those of her husbands: the flaming sword of Charles VIII and the porcupine of Louis XII. She also used the motto Potius Mori Quam Foedari ("Rather die than dishonor") (in Breton "Kentoc'h mervel eget bezañ saotret").

This could be found in many places related to her functions as Duchess or Queen:

- Wall covering of the burial in Solesmes Abbey, by Michel Colombe, 1496.
- Stained glass at Ervy-le-Châtel church, 1515.
- Stained glass at the town hall of Étampes, 1853.

== The Hunt of the Unicorn tapestries ==
There is unproven speculation that the tapestries The Hunt of the Unicorn relate to her marriage to King Louis.

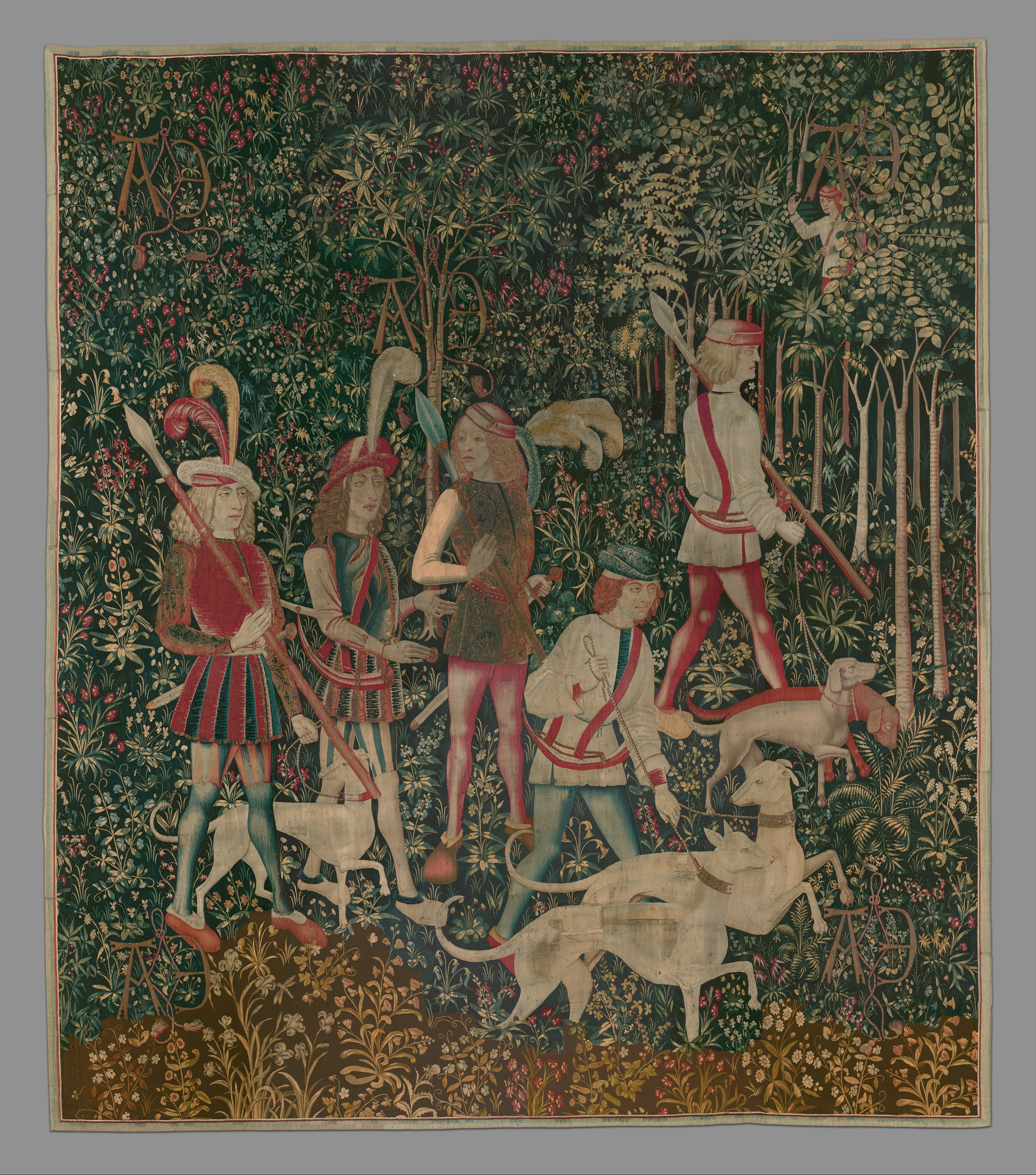
The Hunters Enter the Woods

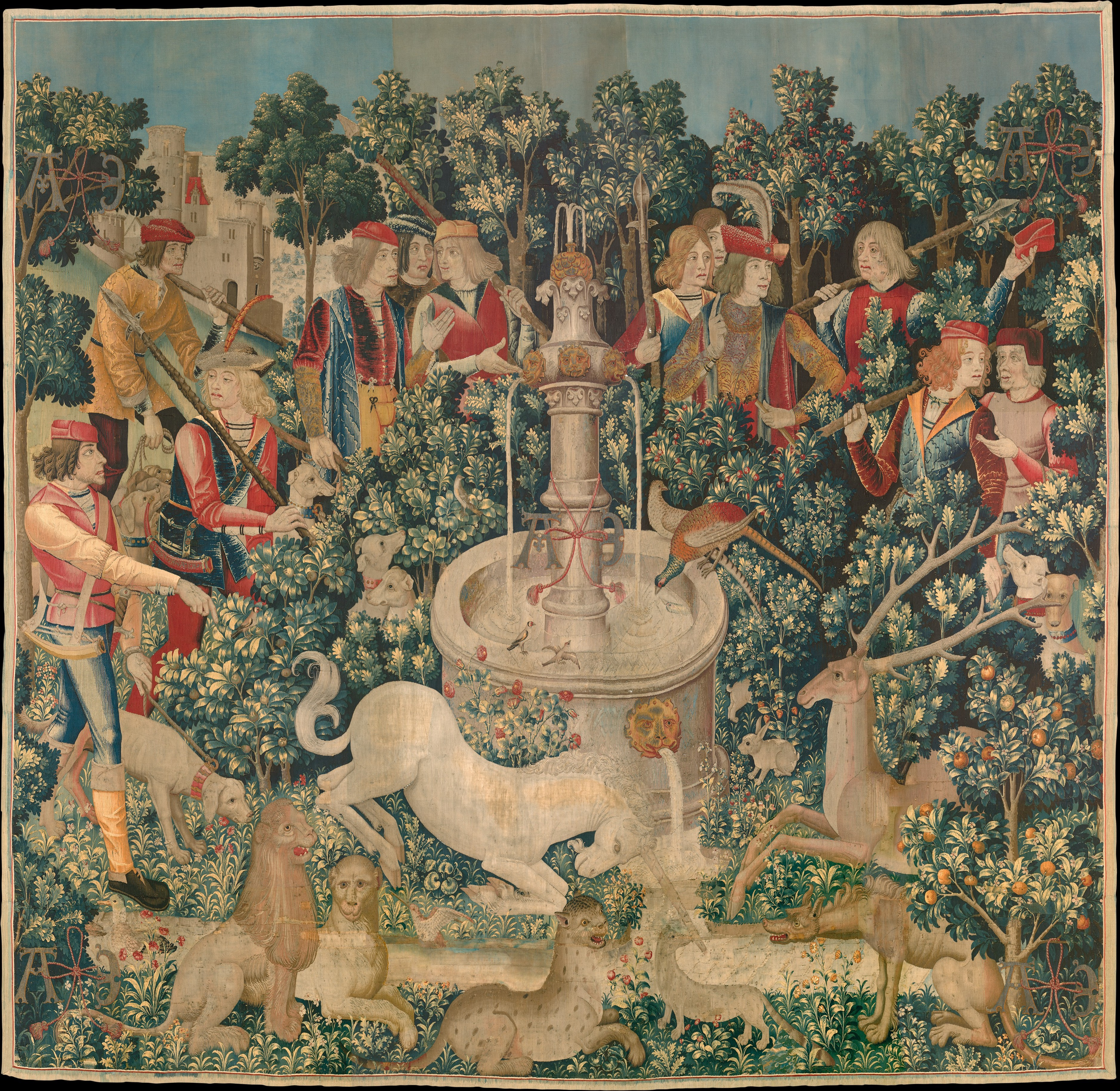
The Unicorn Is Found

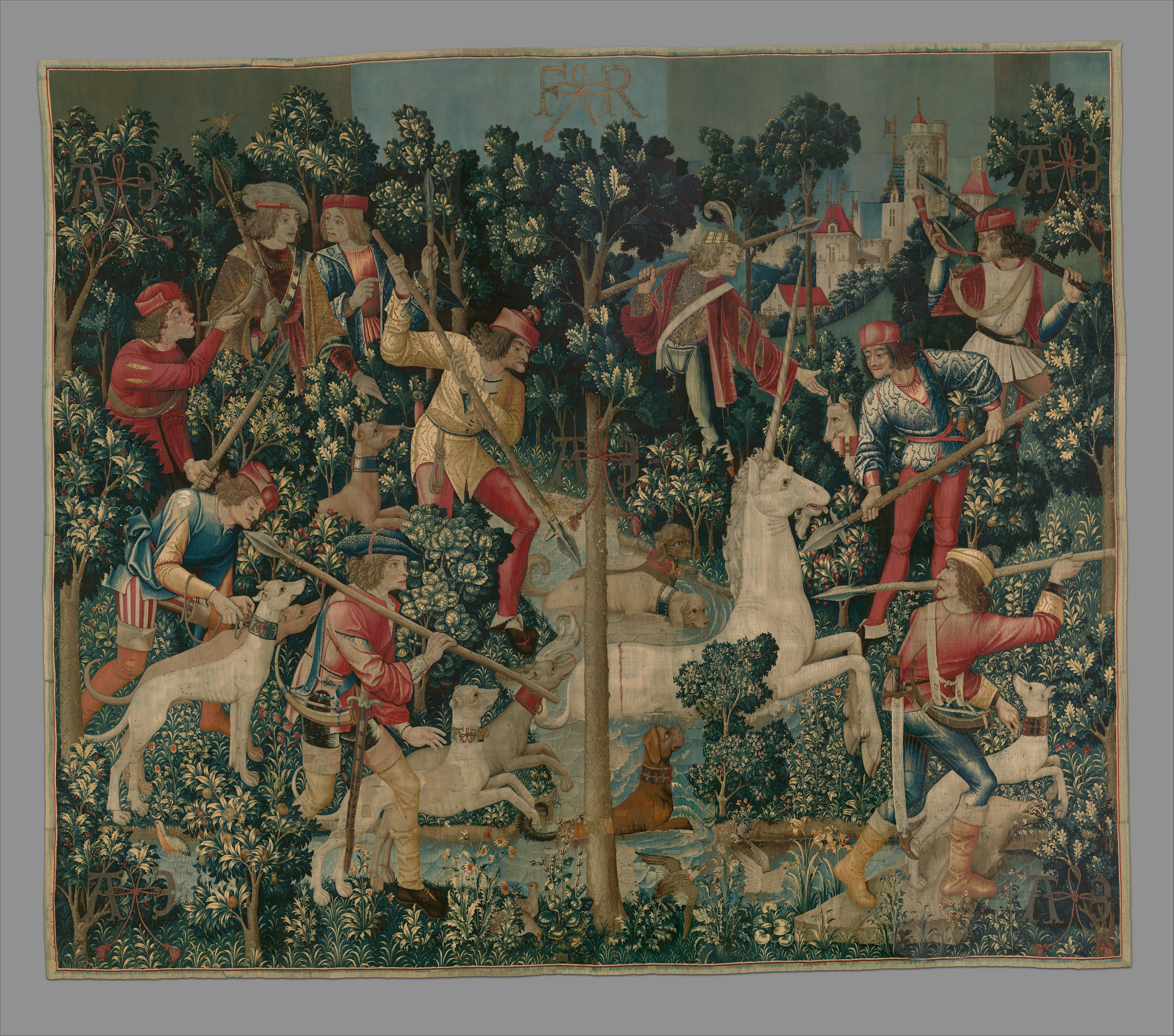
The Unicorn Is Attacked

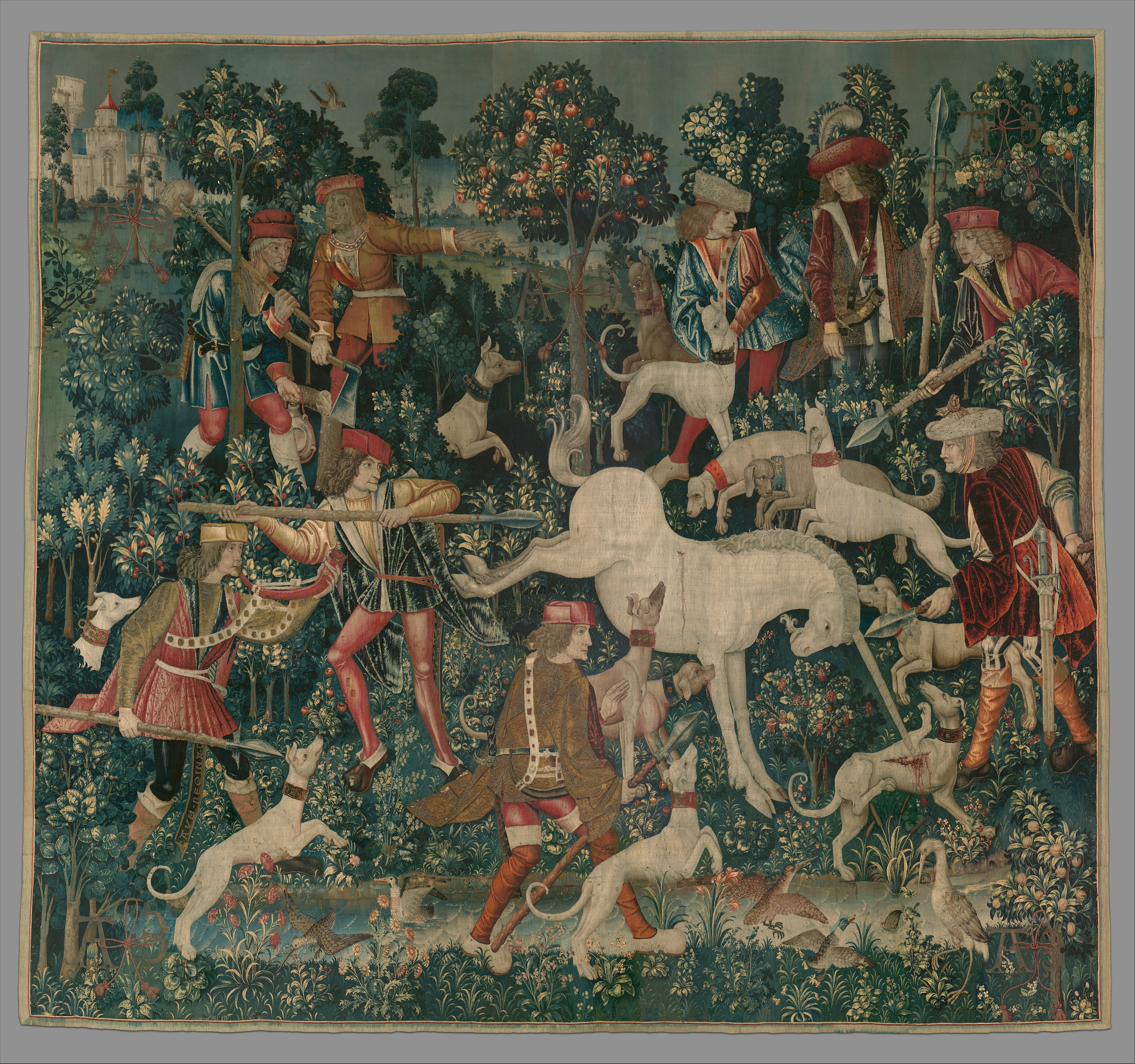
The Unicorn Defends Itself

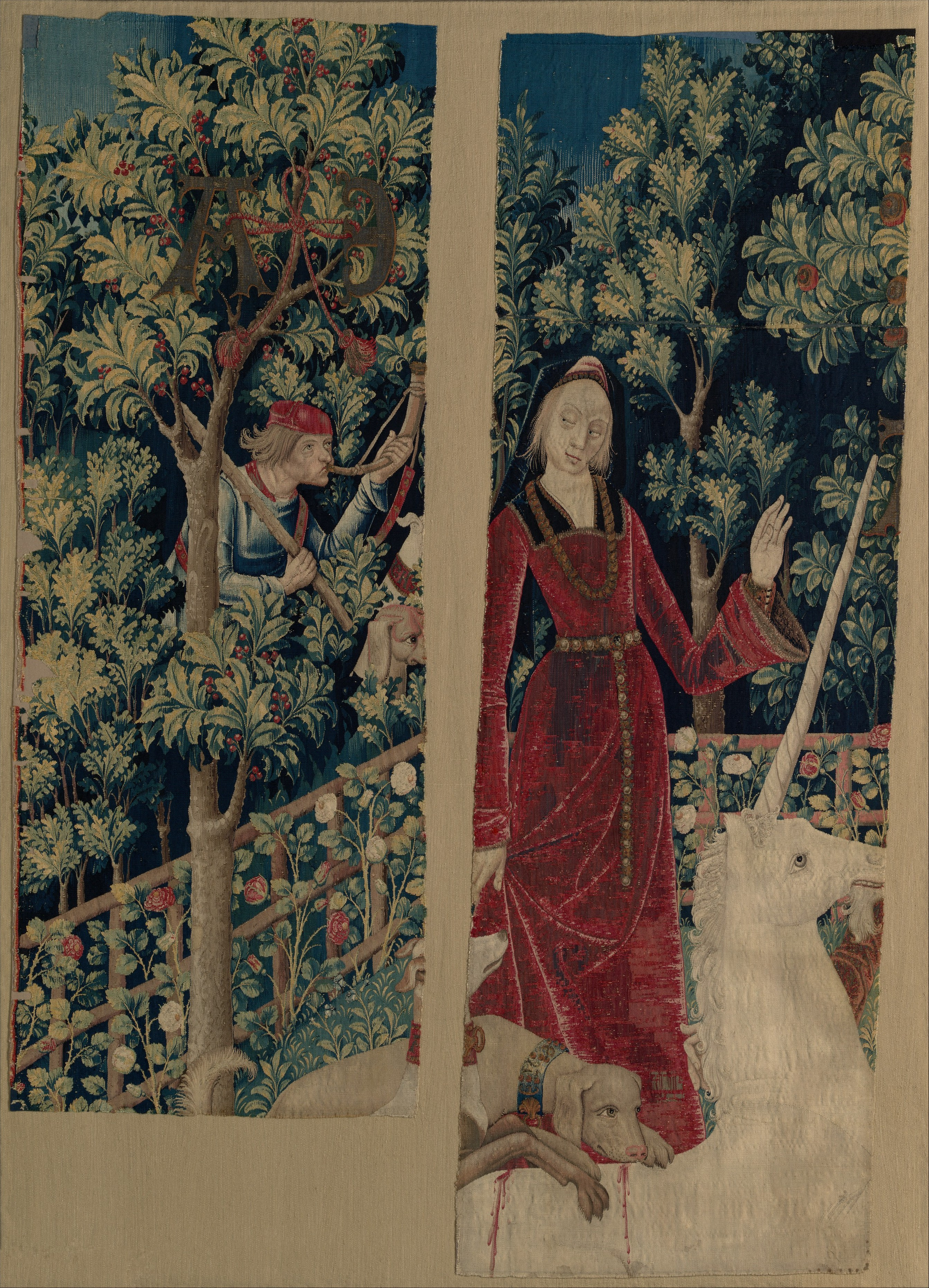
The two fragments of The Mystic Capture of the Unicorn

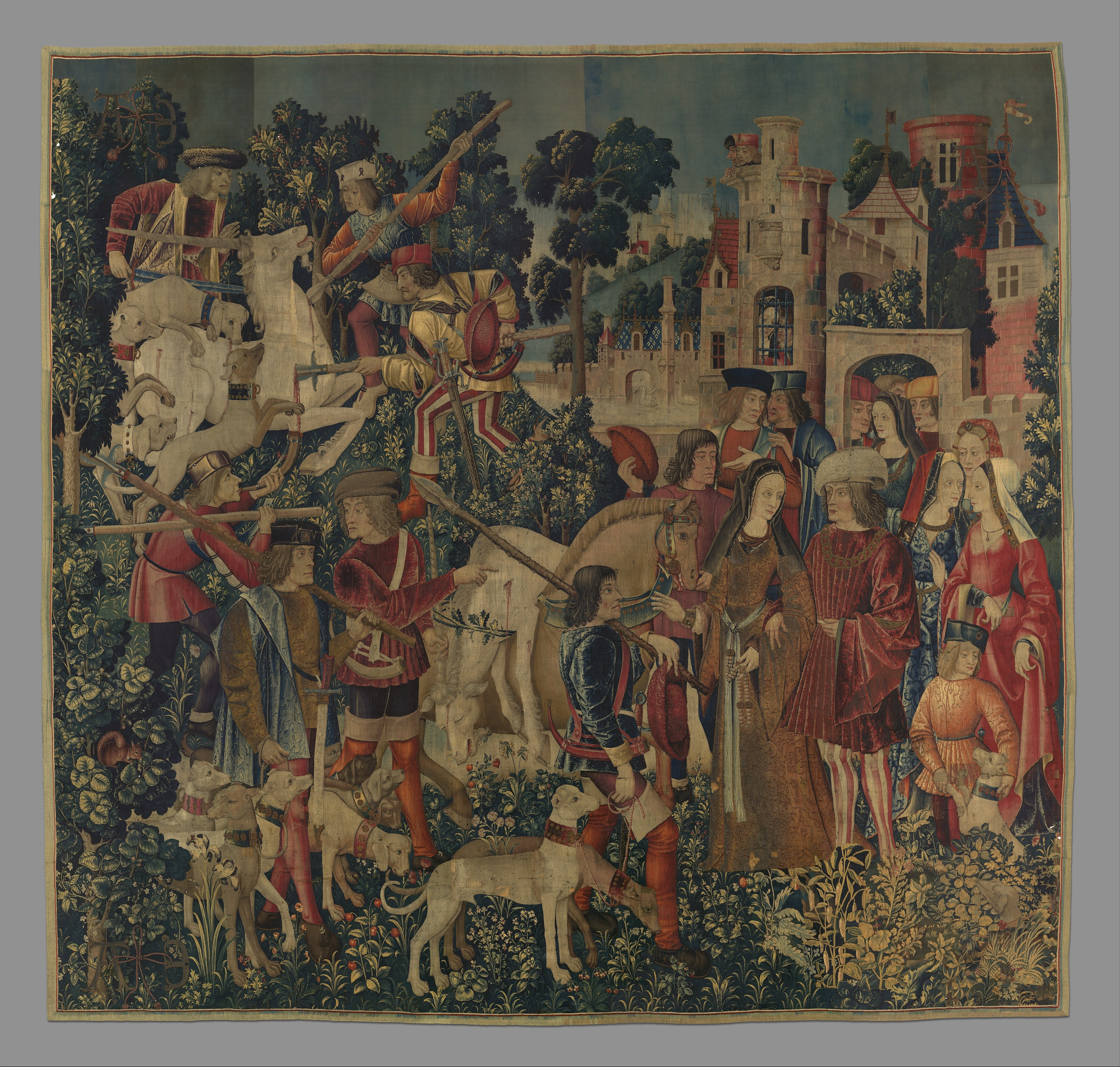
The Unicorn Is Killed and Brought to the Castle

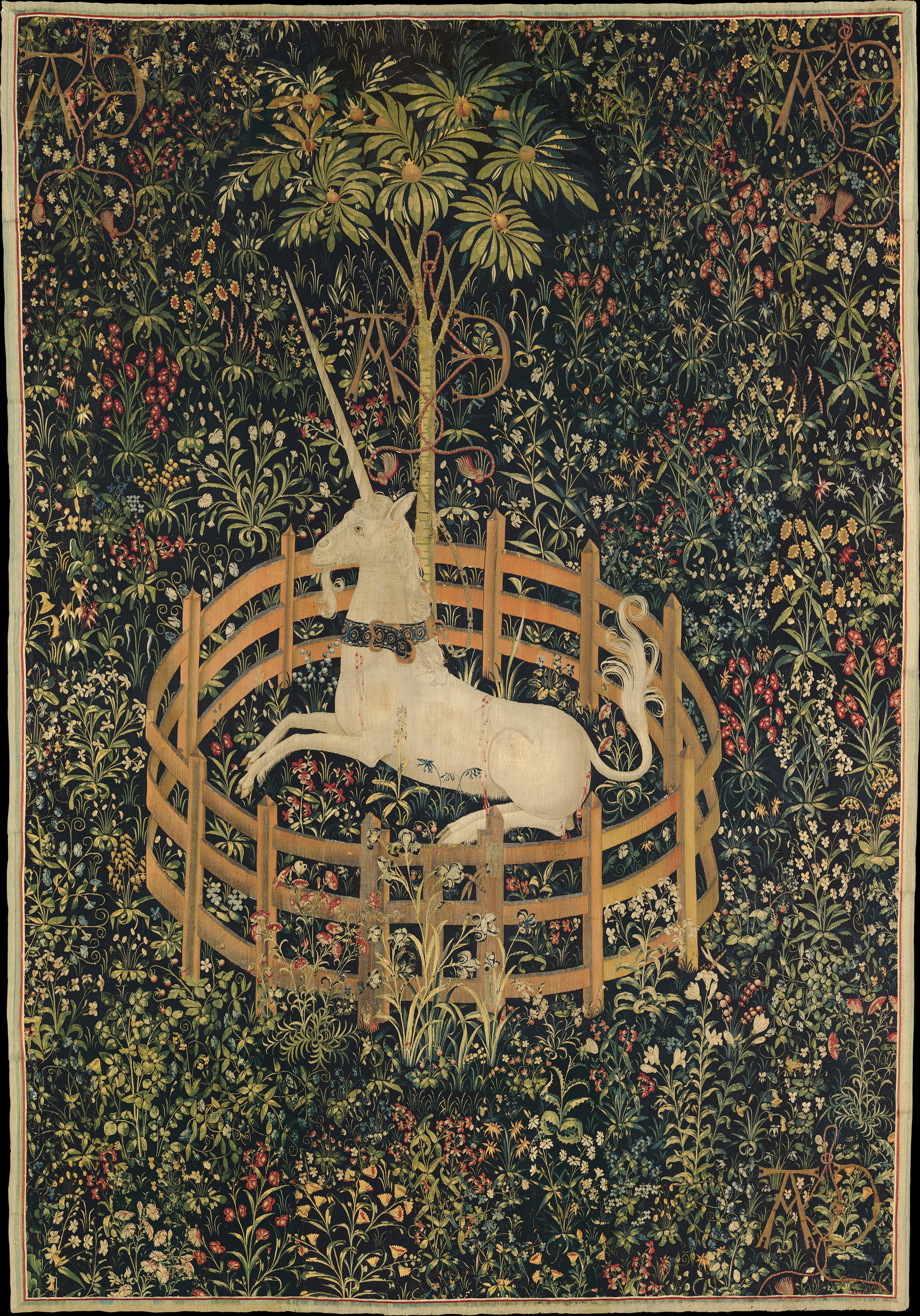
The Unicorn Is in Captivity and No Longer Dead

== Representations and social legacy ==
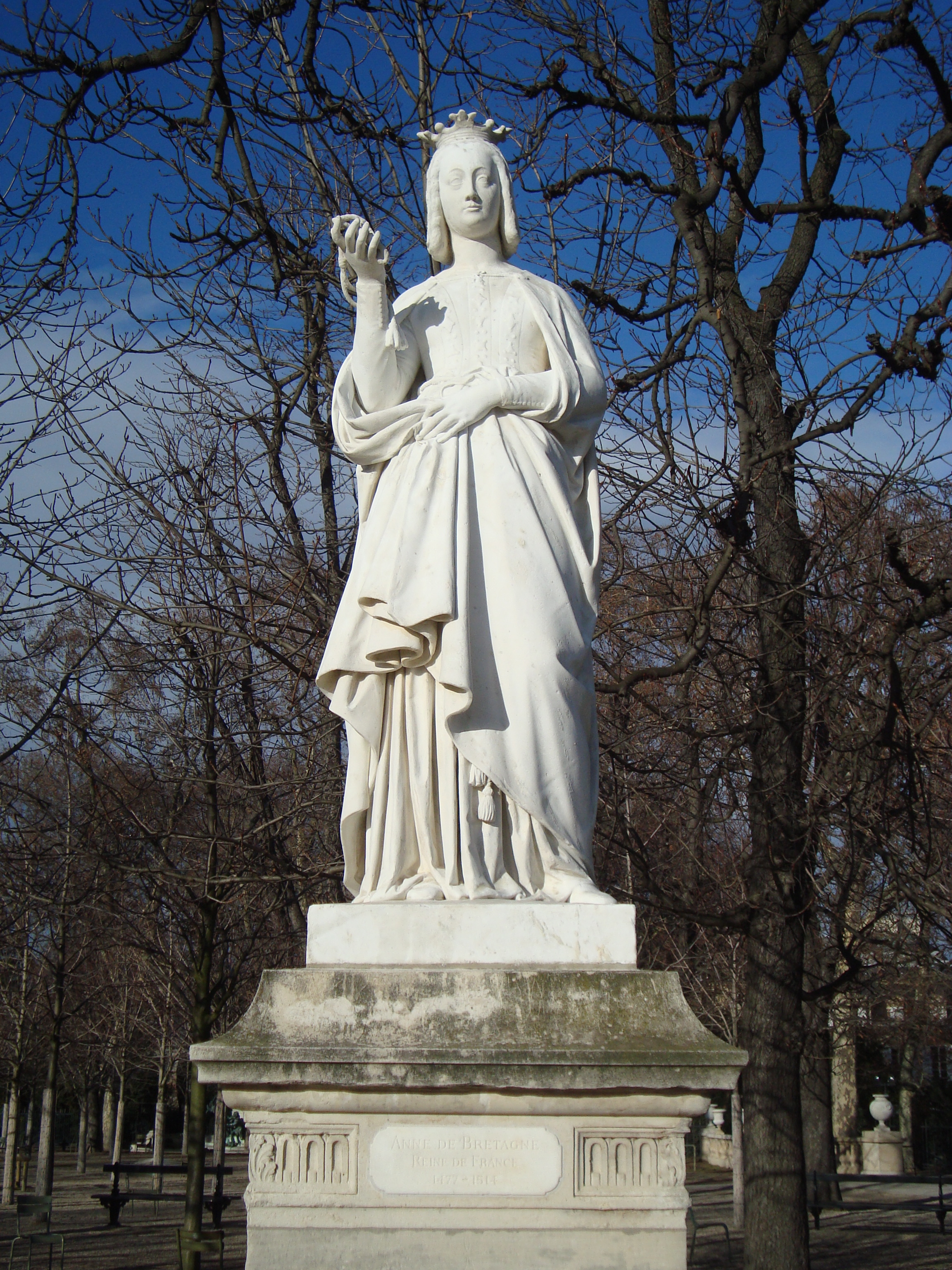
Statue of Anne of Brittany in the Reines de France et Femmes illustres series, Jardin du Luxembourg, Paris.

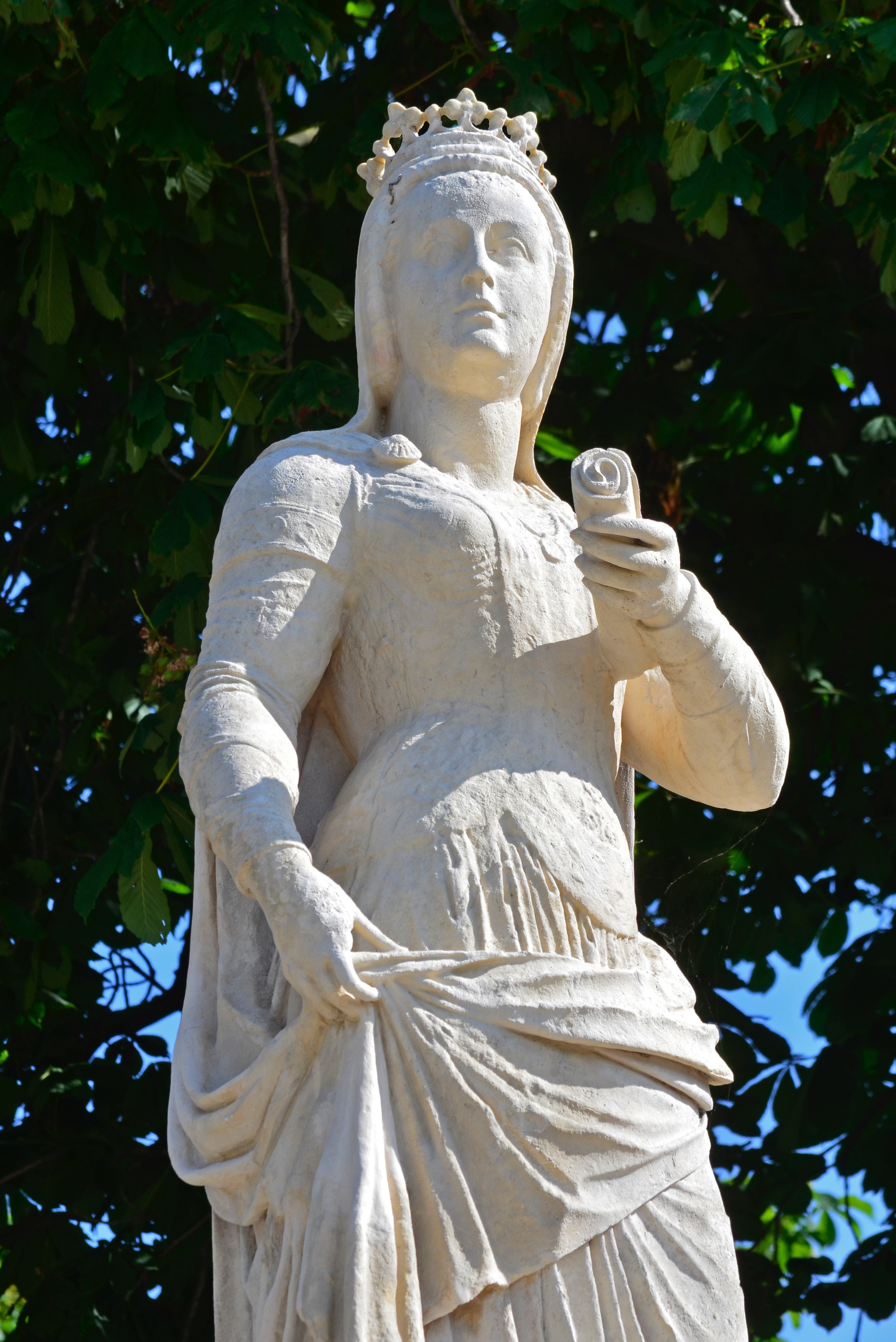
Statue of Duchess Anne of Brittany, by Johann Dominik Mahlknecht. Cours Saint-Pierre, Nantes, France.

Even while she was alive, the royal propaganda of Charles VIII and of Louis XII depicted Anne of Brittany as a perfect queen, a symbol of union and peace between the Kingdom of France and the Duchy of Brittany (the popular tradition of the "Good Duchess"). In the following centuries, historians and popular culture sometimes presented Anne of Brittany in differing fashions, ascribing to her physical and psychological characteristics that are not necessarily supported by historical evidence.

After her death, she was gradually forgotten until the mid-19th century. After the foundation of the Breton Association in 1843, Breton regionalists sought a figure which could embody their ideal of agrarian and regional renewal, while expressing their attachment to the French nation. Their choice was Anne of Brittany (hence the legend of the "Duchess in clogs").

Many myths now surround Anne of Brittany, as a woman forced into an arranged marriage with Charles VIII, the Duchess of Brittany committed to the independence and happiness of her country, or otherwise of a Queen symbol of union and peace between Brittany and France. It has become an issue between those Breton historians pursuing a mythologizing of their past, and those forging a national historiography with the myth of a French nation one and indivisible.

This symbolism explains the release of fifty books during the last 200 years giving contrasting visions of Anne: at one extreme there is Georges Minois, who presented her as a person "limited, petty and vindictive", and at the other Philippe Tourault, who gave her a "quite richly and favorable personality, ardently attached to her country and people".

== Ancestry ==
Ancestors of Anne of Brittany

8. John IV, Duke of Brittany
4. Richard, Count of Étampes
9. Joan of Navarre
2. Francis II, Duke of Brittany
10. Louis I, Duke of Orléans
5. Margaret, Countess of Vertus
11. Valentina Visconti
1. Anne of Brittany
12. John I, Count of Foix
6. Gaston IV, Count of Foix
13. Jeanne of Albret
3. Margaret of Foix
14. John II of Aragon
7. Eleanor of Navarre
15. Blanche I of Navarre

== See also ==
- Anne of Brittany's heart jewel case

== Sources ==
- Robin, Diana Maury; Larsen, Anne R.; Levin, Carole (2007). Encyclopedia of Women in the Renaissance: Italy, France, and England. ABC-CLIO. ISBN 978-1-85109-772-2.

Anne of Brittany House of Montfort Cadet branch of the House of Dreux Born: 25 January 1477 Died: 9 January 1514
Regnal titles
| Preceded by Francis II | Duchess of Brittany; 1488–1514 | Succeeded by Claude |
| Preceded by Gaston | Countess of Étampes; 1512–1514 | Succeeded by Claude |
Royal titles
| Vacant Title last held by Charlotte of Savoy | Queen consort of France; 1491–1498 | Succeeded by Joan of France |
| Vacant Title last held by Joan of France | Queen consort of France; 1499–1514 | Vacant Title next held by Mary of England |
| Preceded by Isabella del Balzo | Queen consort of Naples; 1501–1504 | Succeeded by Isabella I of Castile |
