= Margaret of Foix =

Duchess of Brittany

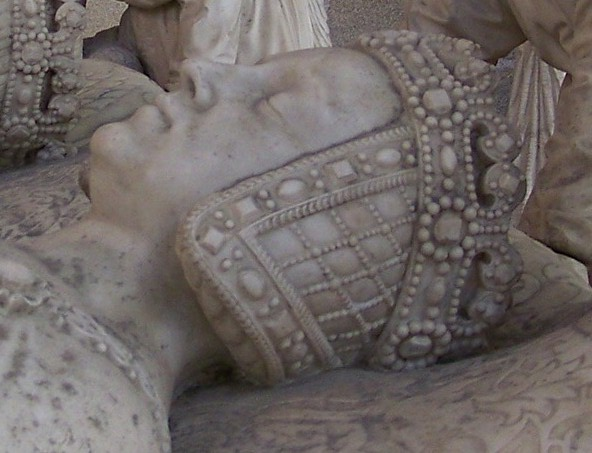
- Margaret's face on her tomb in Nantes

Duchess consort of Brittany
- Tenure: 27 June 1474 – 15 May 1487
- Born: c. 1449
- Died: 15 May 1487; Château de Nantes, Nantes
- Burial: Cathedral of St. Peter and St. Paul, Nantes
- Spouse: Francis II, Duke of Brittany (m. 1474)
- Issue: Anne, Duchess of Brittany; Isabeau of Brittany
- House: Foix-Grailly
- Father: Gaston IV, Count of Foix
- Mother: Eleanor of Navarre

Margaret of Foix (French: Marguerite de Foix; c. 1449– 15 May 1487) was Duchess of Brittany from 1474 to 1487 by marriage to Duke Francis II.

== Life ==
She was the daughter of Queen Eleanor of Navarre (1425–1479) and of Gaston IV, Count of Foix (1425–1472).

On 27 June 1471, at the Château de Clisson, she married Francis II, Duke of Brittany (1435–1488), son of Richard of Brittany, Count of Étampes (1395–1438), and Margaret of Orléans, Countess of Vertus (1406–1466). It was Francis's second marriage, his first wife, Margaret of Brittany, having died in 1469.

Margaret of Foix died at the Château de Nantes in Nantes and is interred in the Cathedral of St. Peter and St. Paul (French: Cathédrale Saint-Pierre-et-Saint-Paul) beside her husband and Margaret of Brittany, in a magnificent tomb constructed in the early French Renaissance style.

== Issue ==
- Anne of Brittany (1477–1514), Duchess of Brittany (1488–1514), and twice Queen of France: from 1491 to 1498 as the wife of King Charles VIII of France, and from 1499 to 1514 as the wife of King Louis XII of France.
- Isabeau of Brittany (1478–1490), betrothed to Jean d'Albret in 1481, died young, and was buried in the Rennes Cathedral.

== Sources ==
- Booton, Diane E. (2010). Manuscripts, Market and the Transition to Print in Late Medieval Brittany. Ashgate Publishing.
- Woodacre, Elena (2013). The Queens Regnant of Navarre: Succession, Politics, and Partnership, 1274-1512. Palgrave Macmillan.
- Anthony, R. (1931). Identification et Étude des Ossements des Rois de Navarre inhumés dans la Cathédrale de Lescar [Identification and Study of the Bones of the Kings of Navarre buried in the Cathedral of Lescar] (PDF). Archives du Muséum, 6e series (in French). Vol. VII. Masson et Cie.

Margaret of Foix House of Foix-Grailly Born: c. 1449 Died: 15 May 1487
Royal titles
Preceded by Margaret of Brittany	Duchess consort of Brittany; 1471–1487	Succeeded by Catherine de' Medici
