= Isabeau of Brittany =

French noble

- Born: c. 1478; Nantes, Brittany
- Died: 10 June 1490 (aged 11–12); Rennes, Brittany
- Burial: Rennes Cathedral
- House: Dreux-Montfort
- Father: Francis II, Duke of Brittany
- Mother: Margaret of Foix
- Religion: Roman Catholicism

Isabeau of Brittany (in French Isabeau de Bretagne) (1478-24 June 1490), was the younger daughter of Francis II, Duke of Brittany and Margaret of Foix. She was, during her life, her sister Anne of Brittany's heir to the Duchy of Brittany.

== Biography ==
She lived in the Château de Nantes. She was betrothed to Jean d'Albret in 1481, but he married Catherine of Navarre instead. She was eight years old when her mother died. She was 10 years old when her father died. She died in 1490 at the age of twelve years from pneumonia. She was buried in the Rennes Cathedral.

== Sources ==
- Matarasso, Pauline Maud (2001). Queen's Mate: Three Women of Power in France on the Eve of the Renaissance. Routledge. ISBN 9780754603214.
