= Francis I d'Avaugour =

French count (1462–1510)

- Crest of Francis I (of Brittany) d'Avaugour (1462-1510)
- Born: 1462
- Died: 1510 (aged 47–48)
- Spouse: Madeleine de Brosse (married 1492-1510)
- Children: Francis II d'Avaugour
- Parents: Francis II, Duke of Brittany (father); Antoinette de Maignelais (mother)

Francis I d'Avaugour (1462–1510) Count of Vertus, Count of Goëllo, Baron of Avaugour and Lord of Clisson, was the bastard son of the Duke of Brittany, Francis II, and the Viscountess of La Guerche, Antoinette de Maignelais.

== Biography ==
In 1481, Francis was given the title of Lord of Clisson. The Lordship of Avaugour, which was revived by his father, Francis II, was given to him in 1483. He was the founder of the second House of Avaugour of the Counts of Goëllo, and was given the county of Vertus in 1485 by his father. He renounced his personal rights before the Estates of Brittany in favor of Anne de Bretagne, his half-sister, during the succession crisis of 1488–1491, but these continued under Breton law in pursuit of his posterity.

Despite holding these titles, this cadet branch of the House of Avaugour was considered a bastard cadet branch and only held legitimacy through Francis' wife, Madeleine de Brosse, descendant of Charles de Bloirs.

Francis clashed with his father, notably over conflicts surrounding the personality of Pierre Landais. Near the end of the Mad War, Francis, seeing the eventual French victory, accepted a royal pension of 6000 livres tournois. He was governor of Saint-Malo in 1487, and was made a knight of the Order of Saint-Michel by the King of France.

=== Descendants ===
In 1492, he married Madeleine de Brosse, daughter of Jean III, Count of Penthièvre. They had the following descendants:

- A son, who died young
- A daughter, Anne (d. after 1523), who died young
- François II d'Avaugour (1493 – June 12, 1517), with posterity. He married Madelene d'Astarac (daughter of Jean IV, count of Astarac)

== See also ==
- History of Brittany

== Sources ==
- Jones, Michael (1988). The Creation of Brittany: A Late Medieval State. The Hambledon Press.
