= Marie of Brittany, Viscountess of Rohan =

French noble (1446–1511)

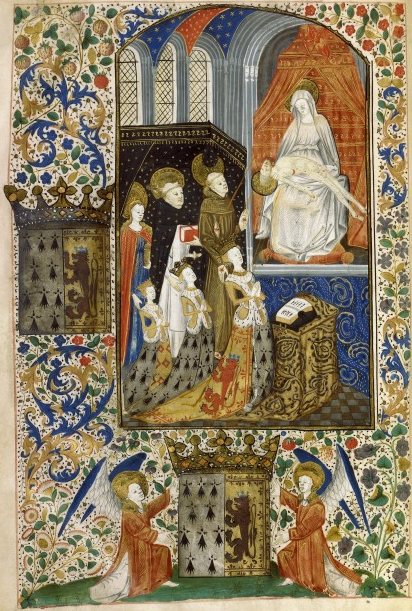
- Marie with her mother and sister
- Born: 1446
- Died: 1511 (aged 64–65)
- Spouse(s): John II of Rohan, Viscount of Rohan, Count of Leon and Porhoët (m. 1462)
- Children: Grandchild: René I, Viscount of Rohan son of her daughter Anne
- Parent(s): Francis I, Duke of Brittany, Isabella of Scotland, Duchess of Brittany

Marie of Brittany (1446–1511) was the younger daughter of Francis I, Duke of Brittany and Isabella of Scotland, Duchess of Brittany, the daughter of King James I of Scotland. She was married to John II, Viscount of Rohan and Count of Porhoët.

== Biography ==
Marie of Brittany married John II of Rohan, Viscount of Rohan, Count of Leon and Porhoët in 1462. John II was the son of Alain IX of Rohan († 1462) and Marie de Lorraine-Vaudémont († 1455).

Marie was the sister-in-law of Francis II, Duke of Brittany through the marriage of her older sister, Margaret, to Francis in 1455. Margaret and Francis had a son who died at a young age. Margaret died in 1469 and from that date, John II of Rohan becomes heir to the throne after the daughters of Francis II.

== Issue ==
Marie and John II of Rohan had seven children.

- François (10 Jul 1469-killed in action 1488)
- Jean (2 Oct 1476-2 Jun 1505)
- Jacques, Viscount of Rohan and Leon, Count de Porhoet, (1478-16 Oct 1527); married first Françoise de Rohan; married second Françoise, daughter of Jean de Daillon (and later wife of Joachim de Goyon de Matignon, Count de Thorigny)
- Georges (1479–1502)
- Claude, (1480-15 Jul 1540) Bishop of Leon and after the death of his brother Jacques, Viscount of Rohan from 1527 until 1540.
- Anne, Viscountess of Rohan (1485-5 April 1529) m. 27 Sep 1515 Pierre de Rohan, Lord of Frontenay (k.a. 1525) Her son René I, Viscount of Rohan later became the 18th Viscount of Rohan.
- Marie, d. 9 Jun 1542; m. 17 Nov 1511 Louis IV de Rohan, Lord of Guémené (d. 1527)
