= Isabella Stewart =

Isabella Stewart may refer to:

- Isabella, Countess of Lennox, married name Isabella Stewart
- Isabella Stewart Gardner, American art collector and philanthropist
- Isabella of Scotland, daughter of James I of Scotland
