= Siege of Saint-Lô =

Siege of Saint-Lô may refer to:

- Siege of Saint-Lô (889), the siege, capture, and subsequent massacre of the city by Vikings
- Siege of Saint-Lô (1141), the siege and capture of the town by Geoffrey Plantagenet, Count of Anjou
- Siege of Saint-Lô (1346), the siege and capture of the town by the English during the Hundred Years' War
- Siege of Saint-Lô (1378), the siege and capture of the town by the French during the Hundred Years' War
- Siege of Saint-Lô (1418), the siege and capture of the town by the English during the Hundred Years' War
- Siege of Saint-Lô (1467), the unsuccessful siege of the town by Francis II, Duke of Brittany
