= Hours of Isabella Stuart =

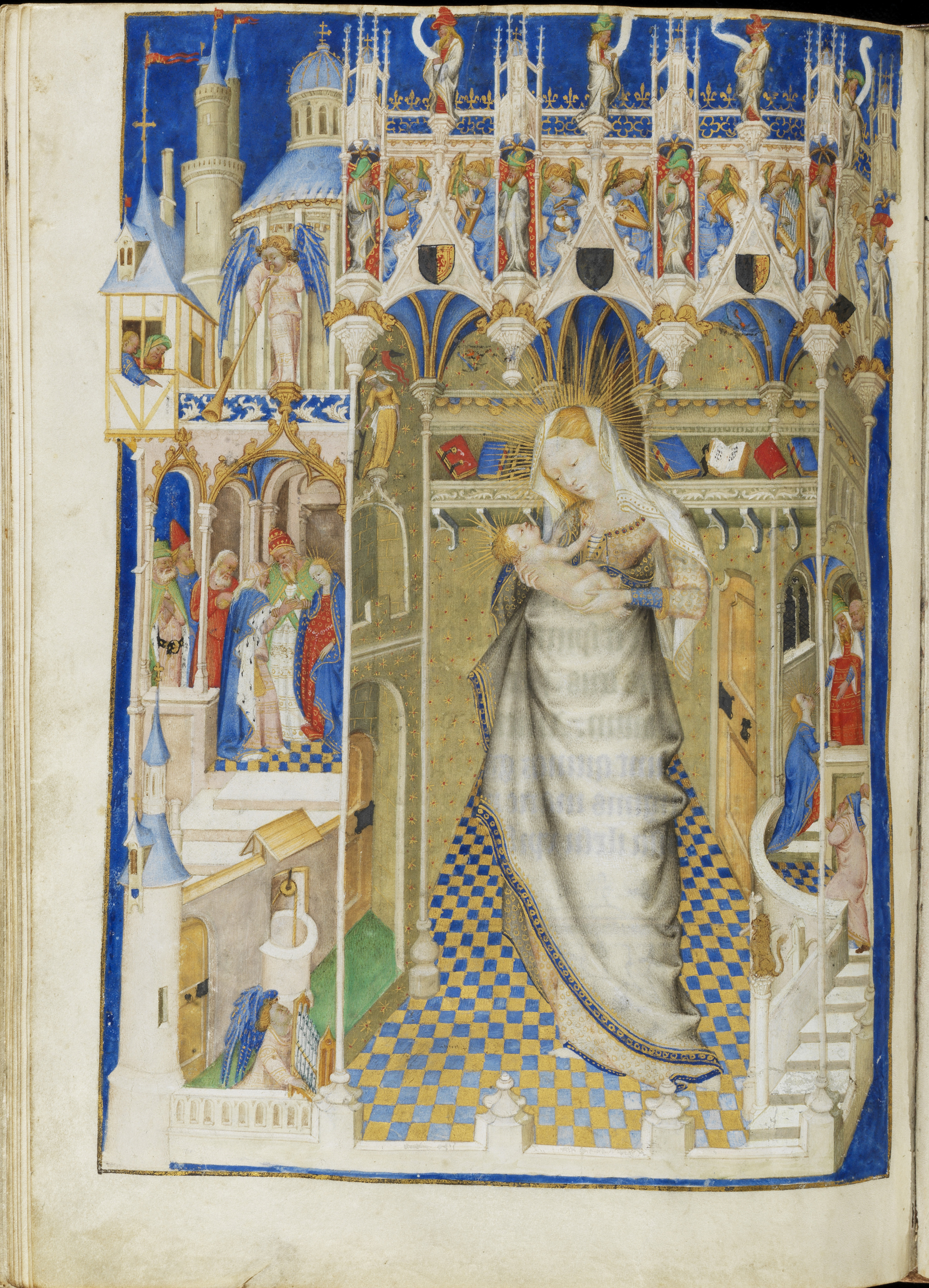
Virgin and Child in a church, Fitzwilliam Museum, Cambridge.

The Hours of Isabella Stuart, Duchess of Brittany (MS 62) is an illuminated Book of Hours produced at Angers either between 1417 and 1418 or before 1431 (there are two competing theories as to its commission), in the workshop of the Rohan Master. There were contributions from other masters, including the Master of Giac and the Master of the Virgin.

The manuscript follows the Paris liturgy of the Hours and is written in Latin. It measures 24.8 by 17.8 cm and has 234 folios. It is made from gold, ink and egg tempera and is one of the most extensively illustrated Books of Hours in existence. It was acquired by Richard Fitzwilliam in 1808, who bequeathed it to the Fitzwilliam Museum of Cambridge upon his death in 1816.

It was originally produced for Yolande of Aragon (1380–1442), Duchess of Anjou, but is named after Isabella Stuart, who was one of its earliest owners and had her family coat of arms added to the book.

Yolande of Aragorn was known for her intelligence and political acumen, and was a patron of the arts, commissioning c. 1400–1414 the building of the chapel of John the Baptist in the Château d'Angers. She at one time owned the "Belles Heures of Jean de France, Duc de Berry" book of hours, and made it available to the Rohan Master while he was working on this book, which was probably intended for her daughter, also named Yolande (1412–40), on the occasion of her marriage to Francis I, Duke of Brittany.

After the death of his first wife, Francis married Isabella Stuart, the second daughter of James I of Scotland and Joan Beaufort, and gifted her the book. It was reilluminated for Isabella to include images of the Scottish princess in heraldic dress (the ermine of Brittany and the lion of Scotland) and her own coat of arms. Isabella passed the book to her daughter by Francis, Margaret of Brittany (1443-1469).

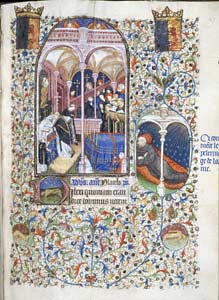
Office of the Dead

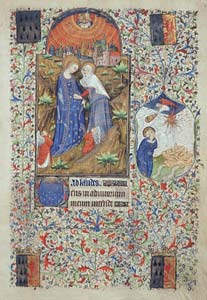
Visitation

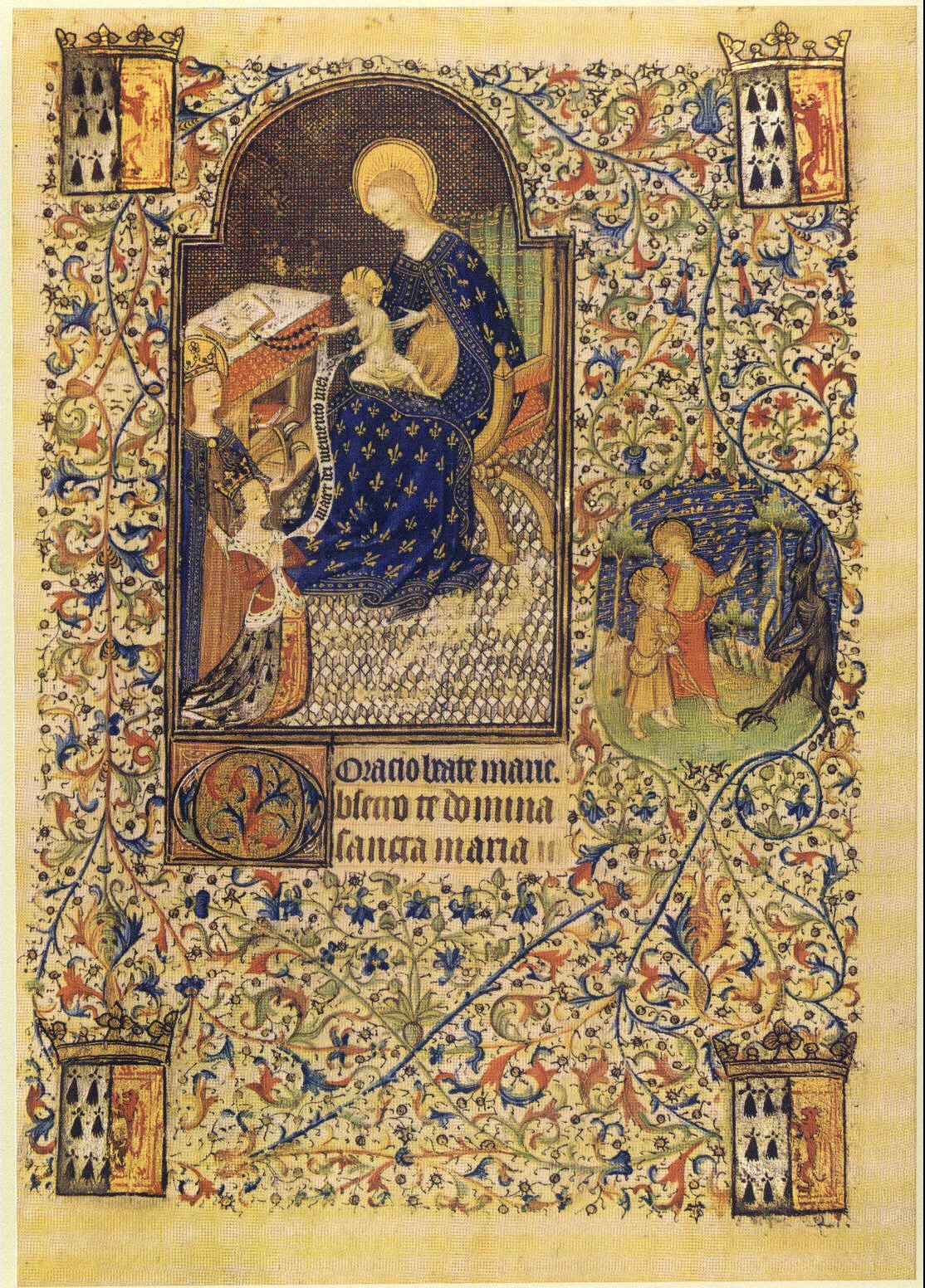
Virgin and Child

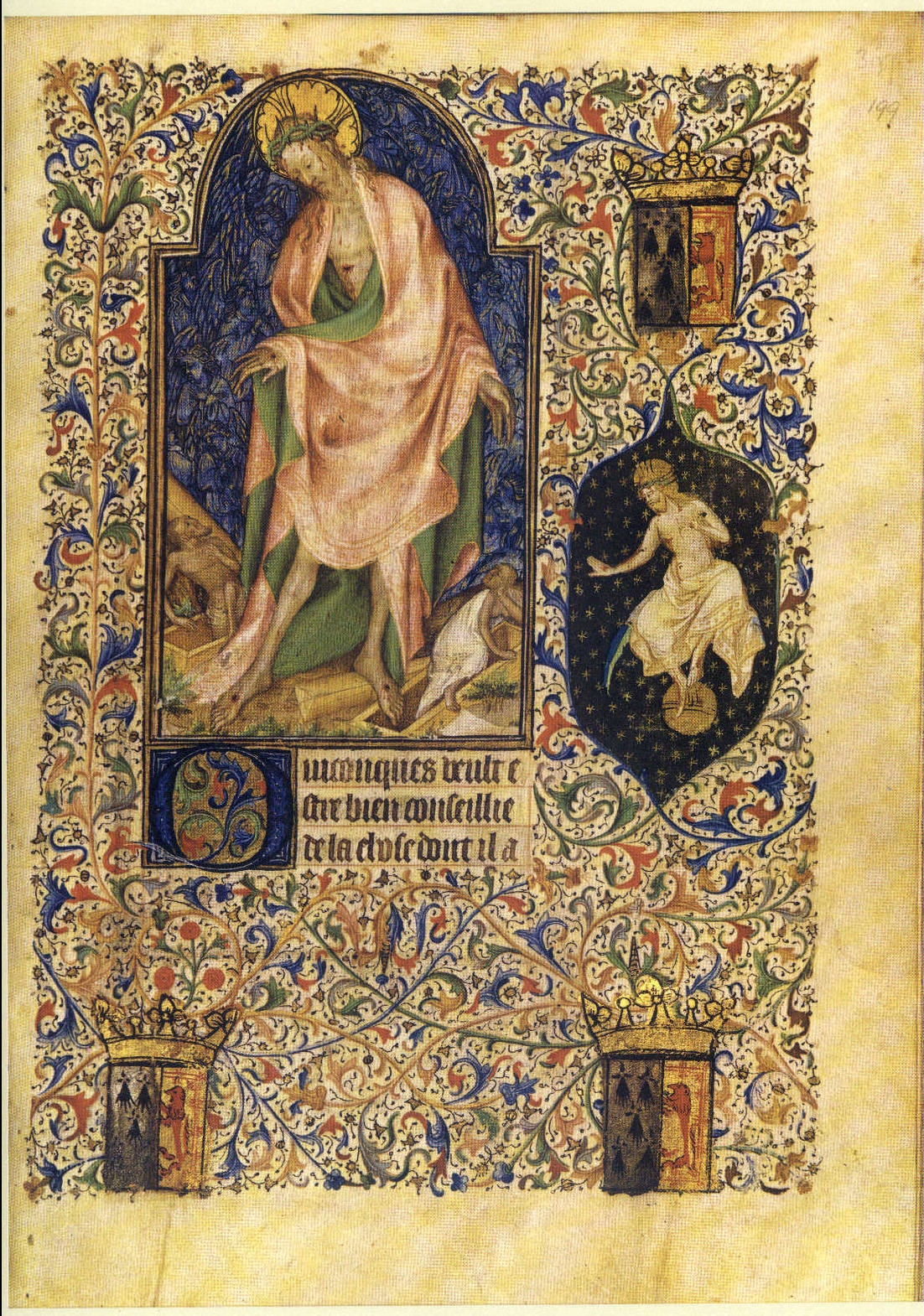
Christ as the Man of Sorrows

== Sources ==
- Harthan, John. Book Of Hours. London: Random House, 1988. ISBN 978-0-5173-6944-9
- Hourihane, Colum. The Grove Encyclopedia of Medieval Art and Architecture. Oxford: Oxford University Press, 2012. ISBN 978-0-1953-9536-5
