= Francis I of Brittany =

Duke of Brittany from 1442 to 1450

Francis I
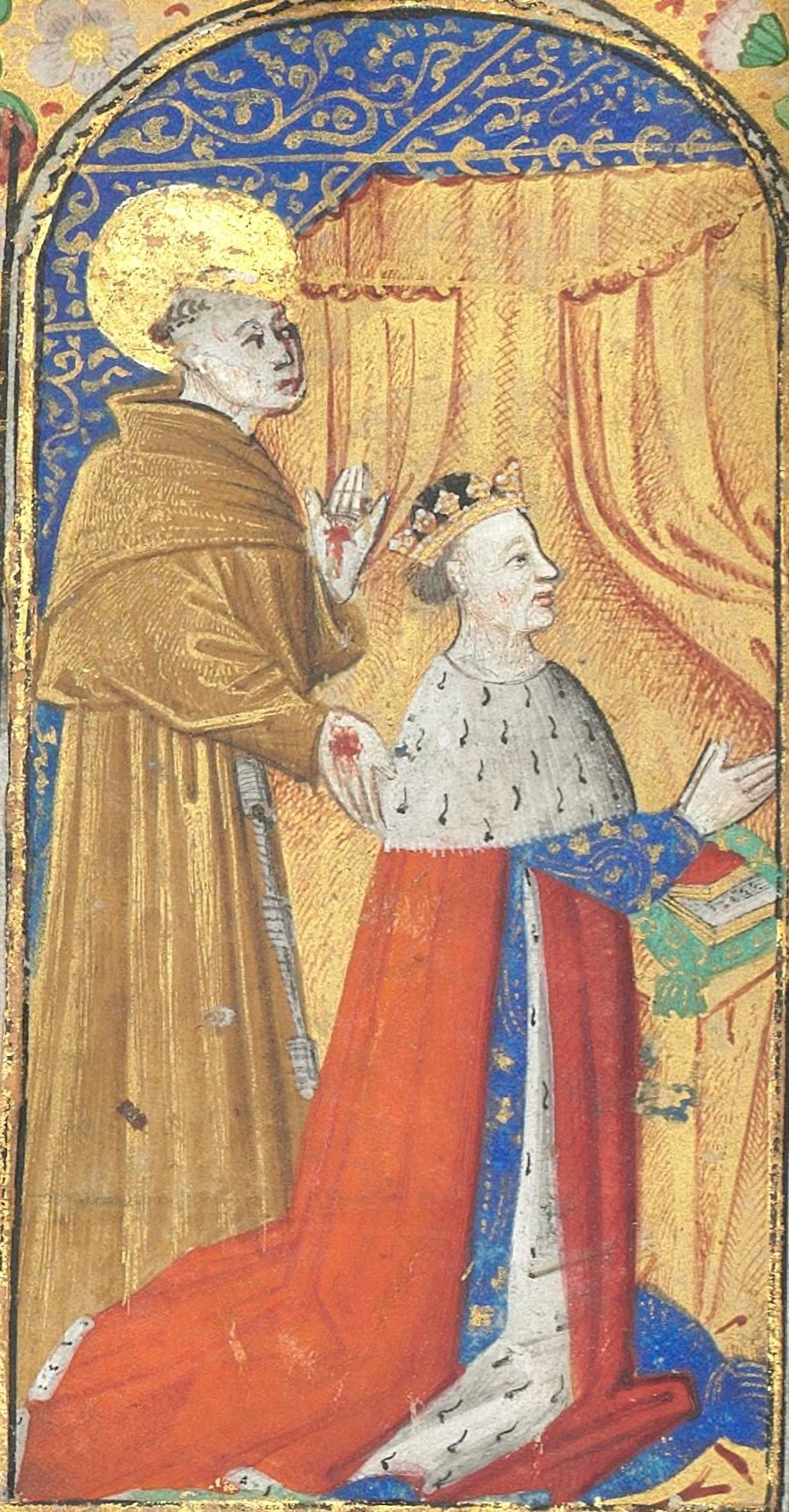
- Miniature of Francis from the Hours of Isabella Stewart, 15th century

Duke of Brittany Count of Montfort
- Reign: 29 August 1442 – 17 July 1450
- Predecessor: John V
- Successor: Peter II
- Born: 11 May 1414; Vannes
- Died: 17 July 1450 (aged 36); Château de l'Hermine, Vannes.
- Burial: Redon Abbey
- Spouses: Yolande of Anjou (m. 1431; died 1440) Isabella of Scotland (m. 1442)
- Issue: Renaud, Count of Montfort; Margaret, Duchess of Brittany; Marie, Viscountess of Rohan
- House: Montfort
- Father: John V, Duke of Brittany
- Mother: Joan of France

Francis I (in Breton Fransez I, in French François I) (11 May 1414 – 17 July 1450), was Duke of Brittany, Count of Montfort and titular Earl of Richmond, from 29 August 1442 to his death. He was born in Vannes, the son of John V, Duke of Brittany and Joan of France, the daughter of King Charles VI of France.

== Family ==
Francis I was originally engaged to Bonne of Savoy, the daughter of Amadeus VIII, Duke of Savoy, and his wife Mary of Burgundy. She died just before their marriage in 1430, at the age of 15.

Francis I's first marriage was to Yolande of Anjou, daughter of Louis II, Duke of Anjou and Yolande of Aragon; they were married in Nantes in August 1431. Francis and Yolande had a son, Renaud, Count of Montfort. His son Renaud died young and his wife Yolande died in 1440.

Francis' second marriage was to Isabel of Scotland, daughter of James I, King of Scots and Joan Beaufort. She had been intended to marry his father John V, Duke of Brittany, with the marriage contract signed on 19 July 1441 and ratified on 29 September 1441, but he died before the wedding took place. Once in Brittany, Isabella married instead with the widowed eldest son of her groom. Francis and Isabel married at the Château d'Auray on 30 October 1442. Francis gifted her the Hours of Isabella Stuart after their wedding.

Francis and Isabel had two daughters:

- Margaret of Brittany (1443–1469, Nantes), married Francis II, Duke of Brittany.
- Marie of Brittany (1444–1506), married John II, Viscount of Rohan and Count of Porhoët.

== Succession ==
Francis I died on 17 July 1450 at the Château de l'Hermine, being only 36 years of age. Because he had no surviving male heirs at the time of his death, he was succeeded as Duke of Brittany by his younger brother, Peter II of Brittany.

During his time, the residences of the Dukes of Brittany consisted of: the Château de l'Hermine; the Château de Nantes; the Château de Clisson; and the Château de Suscinio.

== See also ==
- Dukes of Brittany family tree

== Sources ==
- Booton, Diane E. (2010). Manuscripts, Market and the Transition to Print in Late Medieval Brittany. Ashgate Publishing.
- Chaubet, Daniel (1984). "Une enquête historique en Savoie au XVe siècle". Journal des Savants (in French). 1 (1): 112, n. 45. doi:10.3406/jds.1984.1477. Archived from the original on 4 November 2023.
- Dean, Lucinda H S (2024). Death and the Royal Succession in Scotland, C.1214-C.1543: Ritual, Ceremony and Power. Boydell Press. ISBN 978-1837651726.
- L'Estrange, Elizabeth (2008). Holy motherhood : gender, dynasty and visual culture in the later Middle Ages. Manchester University Press. Manchester; New York : Manchester University Press; New York : Distributed exclusively in the USA by Palgrave. ISBN 978-0-7190-7543-8.
- Rohr, Zita Eva (2016). Yolande of Aragon (1381-1442) Family and Power: The Reverse of the Tapestry. Palgrave Macmillan.

Francis I of Brittany House of Montfort
Regnal titles
Preceded by John V	Duke of Brittany; Count of Montfort; 1442–1450	Succeeded by Peter II
Peerage of England
Preceded by John V	— TITULAR — Earl of Richmond; 1442–1450	Succeeded by Peter II
