= Antoinette de Maignelais =

Mistress of Charles VII of France and Francis II, Duke of Brittany

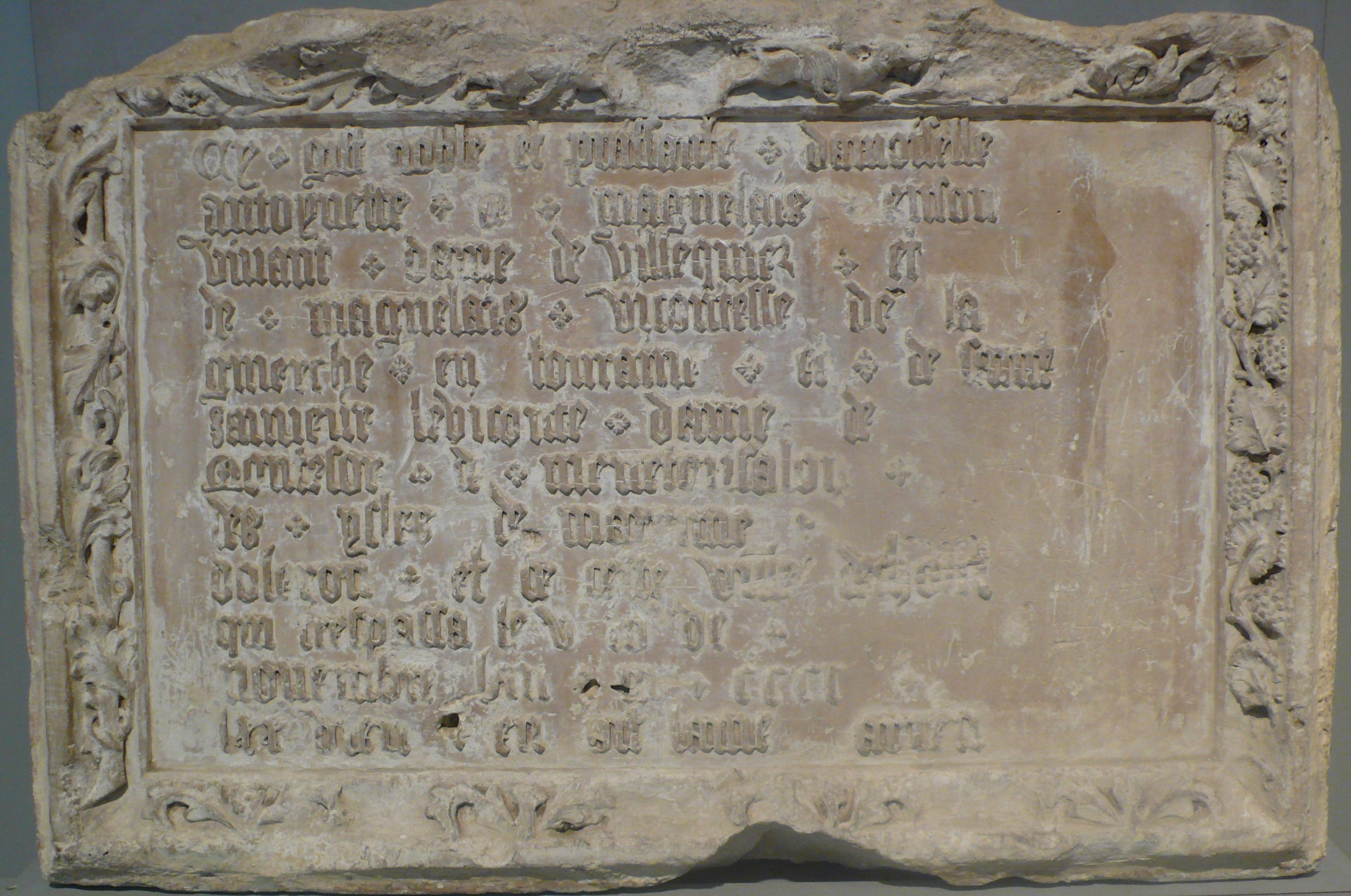
Tombstone

Antoinette de Maignelais (French pronunciation: [ɑ̃twanɛt də mɛɲlɛ]; 1434–1474) was the cousin of Agnès Sorel, favorite mistress of Charles VII of France until her sudden death in 1450. Married to André de Villequier, one of the king's mignons, she enjoyed a short but fruitful marriage, bearing two sons, until his death in 1454. Antoinette was reportedly her cousin's successor as royal mistress, according to contemporary chroniclers, although she had no children by the king. By 1459 she became the mistress of Francis II, Duke of Brittany. It was rumored that she spied on Charles VII on behalf of his son, Louis XI.

== Life ==
Antoinette was the daughter of Jean II de Maignelais and Marie de Jouy. Through her father she was a first cousin of Agnès Sorel, who was Charles VII's mistress from roughly 1444 until her sudden death from mercury poisoning in 1450.

Even before her cousin's death, Antoinette had caught the king's eye. In 1448, when she was fourteen years old, he gave her the lands of Maignelais, which had been the object of a long lawsuit between her ancestor Raoul de Maignelais and the Duke de Bourbon. In the end, the estate had remained in the duke's possession.

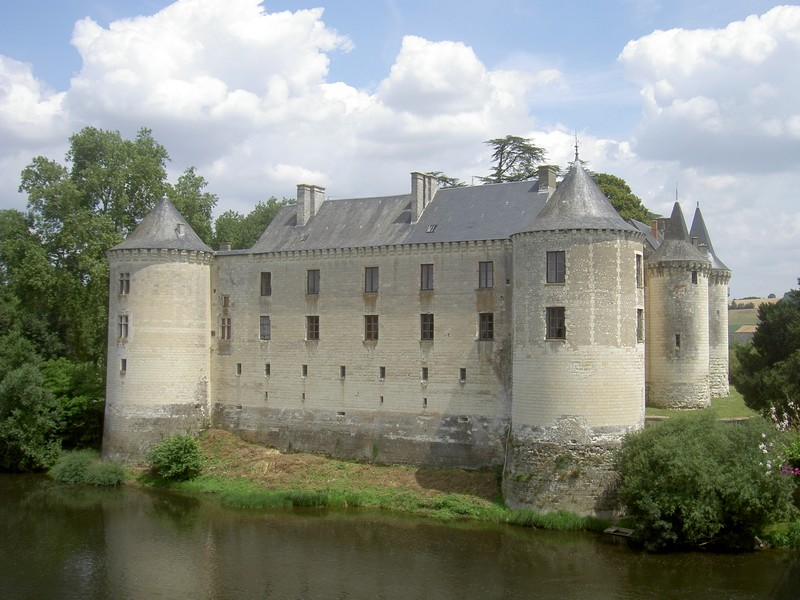
Château de la Guerche along the river Creuse

=== Royal Mistress ===
In her sixteenth year, shortly after Agnès died, Antoinette joined the tight band surrounding Charles VII; some chroniclers presumed that she was his new mistress. (Note: According to Vale, it was not until after the death of Antoinette's husband Andre (April 1454) that she became Charles's mistress) Charles VII married Antoinette to his first gentleman of the bedchamber, André, Baron de Villequier (d. 1454), of Guerche in Touraine. On this occasion the king presented Antoinette with the isles of Oléron, Marennes, and Arvert as a marriage portion, with a pension of 6,000 livres a year for life. The letters granting these advantages are dated October, 1450. For her and her husband, the king ordered the construction of the Château de la Guerche.

It was reported that Antoinette co-operated with the Dauphin (the future Louis XI of France) with whom the King was in a strained relationship, and sent information to the dauphin about his father, thus in effect acting as the spy of the dauphin upon the King.

=== Ducal mistress ===
She began a relationship with Francis II, Duke of Brittany, sometime before the king's death in 1461. She was given a great allowance from the Duke, and resided in the Castle of Cholet, where she hosted a cultural circle and made her court a center of culture in Brittany. She eventually had five children with Francis II, including Francis I d'Avaugour (1462–1510).

When she became mistress of the Duke of Brittany, Louis XI of France expected her to continue to act as his spy, this time upon the Duke of Brittany. Initially, she did fulfil this expectation, but eventually, she changed her loyalties. During the war between France and Brittany, Antoinette de Maignelais sold her jewels to finance the army of Brittany against France. Upon hearing of this, Louis XI of France confiscated her property in France.

She died at Francis II's court in 1474 and a tomb with a statue was erected in her memory.

== Sources ==
- Roy, Émile (1970). La vie et les oeuvres de Charles Sorel, Sieur de Souvigny:(1602-1674) (in French). Slatkine Reprints.
- Vale, Malcolm Graham Allan (1974). Charles the Seventh. University of California Press.
- Wellman, Kathleen (2013-05-21). Queens and Mistresses of Renaissance France. Yale University Press. doi:10.12987/yale/9780300178852.001.0001. ISBN 978-0-300-17885-2. S2CID 152507363.
