= Rohan Master =

French illuminator

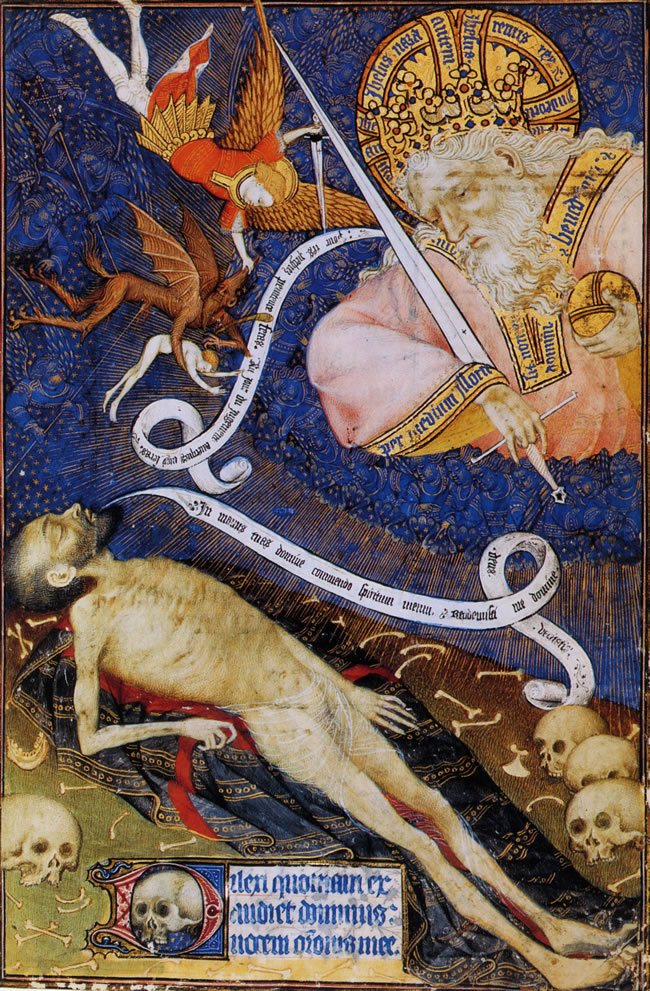
The dead man before his judge, Rohan Hours, Paris c.1430

The Rohan Master is the name given to an anonymous French book illuminator active in the first half of the 15th century, after his main work, the Rohan Hours. He also produced the Hours of Isabella Stuart.
