= Rohan Hours =

15th-century illuminated manuscript

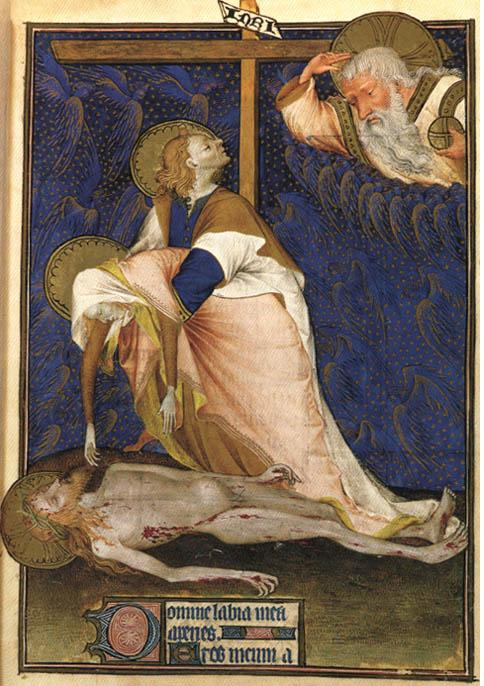
The epitome of the Rohan Master's art is the "Lamentation of the Virgin" (f. 135, Pl. 57) from the Hours of the Cross. The grieving Virgin cannot be consoled by the Apostle John, who looks up in consternation at a saddened God.

The Grandes Heures de Rohan (French: The Grand Hours of Rohan; Paris, Bibliothèque Nationale, MS. Latin 9471; commonly known as The Rohan Hours) is an illuminated manuscript book of hours, painted by the anonymous artist known as the Rohan Master, probably between 1418 and 1425 (though other datings have been suggested), in the Gothic style. It contains the usual offices, prayers and litanies in Latin, along with supplemental texts, decorated with 11 full page, 54 half page, and 227 small miniatures, decorated with tempera paints and gold leaf. The book margins are decorated with Old Testament miniatures with captions in Old French, in the style of a Bible moralisée. The full page illuminations are renowned for the highly emotional and dramatic portrayal of the agonies of Christ and the grief of the Virgin. According to Millard Meiss, "The Rohan Master cared less about what people do than what they feel. Whereas his great predecessors excelled in the description of the novel aspects of the natural world, he explored the realm of human feeling." Meiss concludes that the Rohan Master was the "greatest expressionist in 15th century France." The manuscript is currently housed in the Bibliothèque Nationale, Paris, France.

== History ==
=== Patron ===
The Hours was probably commissioned by Yolande of Aragon (also Iolanthe, Jolantha, and Violant), daughter of Juan I of Aragon, Duchess of Anjou (1380–1443) for her nephew, Charles, the Dauphin of France. Yolande was the widow of Louis II, Duke of Anjou (reigned 1384–1417). In 1422, Yolande married her oldest daughter to Charles, in which case this book could have been commissioned as a wedding gift. Yolande was the protector and mentor of Charles, who would be crowned Charles VII of France in 1429. Duchess Yolande was a strong supporter of Joan of Arc.

An alternate theory suggests that The Hours was commissioned by the House of Rohan, as indicated by their arms shown on some of the pages (blazon: gules, in chief seven mascles d’or). The commission would have been made in 1431 to celebrate the marriage of Charles of Anjou, Count of Maine, to a daughter of Alain IX of Rohan, however that marriage never took place.

Other scholars suggest that Yolande of Aragon commissioned this book of hours for her daughter, which is unlikely, because the Latin prayers have masculine endings.

=== Artists ===
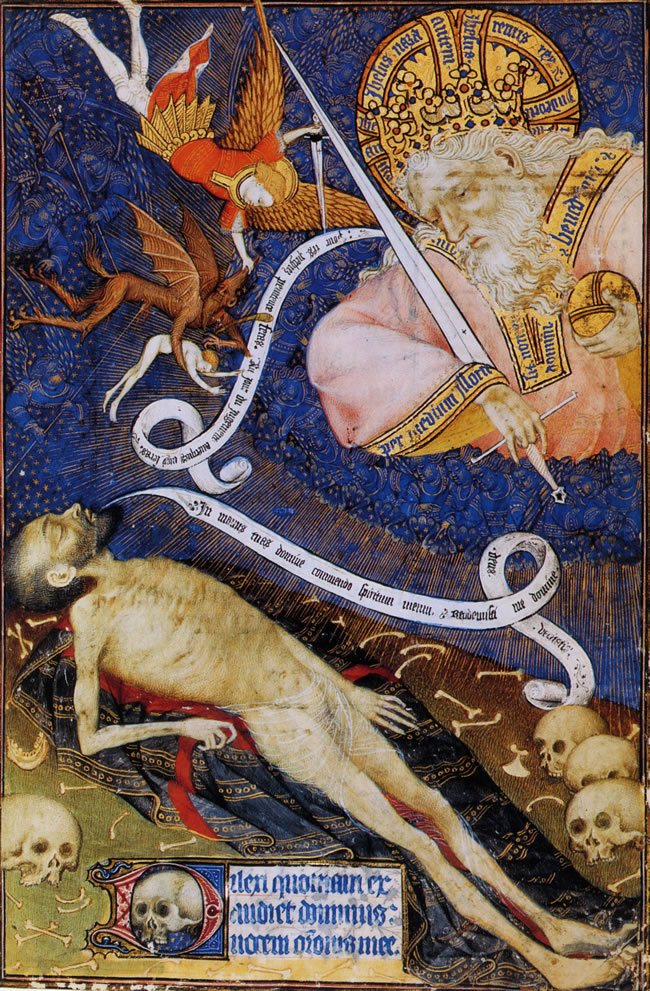
The dead man before God. A demon attempts to steal his soul, but is attacked by St Michael the Archangel.

As with many northern European artists of this period, the identity of the Rohan Master is shrouded in mystery. The Rohan Master was the anonymous illuminator who is named after this masterpiece of 15th-century illumination. Scholars assume that the Rohan Master headed a large, productive workshop that had the favor and patronage of the House of Anjou. The first studies of the miniatures indicated that the Rohan Master only painted 3 and a half of the full page miniatures. Since the Master illuminated so little of the book, it was not known whether he was a painter, or an entrepreneur. Meiss and Thomas ascribe ten of the eleven surviving full page miniatures to the Rohan Master, as well as three half page miniatures: folio 33v, Plate 36; f. 210, Pl. 79; and f. 217, Pl. 93. Meiss references altar panels that the Rohan Master had painted, proving he was more than an entrepreneur; he was a skilled painter of church art, as well as a dramatic miniaturist. There is another Book of Hours in the British Library attributed to the master, plus a further one there and others elsewhere attributed to artists close to him. The BnF also has a Boccaccio by him and his workshop.

The Rohan Master's miniatures are highly emotional. He used the angle of the face, hair, gestures, and draping of veils and clothing to convey his figures’ emotions. Such expressiveness was not usual in 15th-century France. Meiss suggests that the Rohan Master came from the Netherlands, Germany, Provence, or Catalonia, the homeland of his patroness, Yolande.

The majority of the book was illuminated by workshop assistants. The full page Crucifixion (f. 27, Pl. 33) and the majority of the half page miniatures were probably done by a second, lesser illuminator in the workshop. The style of the workshop was greatly influenced by the Bedford and Boucicaut Masters. And, the iconographic models for many of the assistants’ illuminations came from the Limbourg Brothers, and the Angevin Bible, Bible moralisée. The copied Bible moralisée illuminations in the margins were done rather quickly and imperfectly by two or three minor painters from the Rohan workshop.

=== Provenance ===
After Yolande's death, the manuscript passed to her son, René of Anjou. In the early half of the 15th century, it was in the possession of Isabella Stuart, Duchess of Brittany (c. 1426–1494), who added her arms in the corners of folio 135r, left. Her youngest daughter, Mary of Brittany, married John II, Viscount of Rohan. The Hours may have passed to the House of Rohan at that time. In the 17th century, it was owned by the Jesuits. In 1784, it was sold to the Royal Library by the Duke of La Vallière. Currently, The Rohan Hours is in the Bibliothèque Nationale, Paris.

== Description ==
Vellum, 239 folios, 11.4 x 8.3 in. (290 x 210 mm), with 11 full page, 54 half page, and 227 small miniatures, decorated with egg tempera colors and gold leaf. An Old Testament miniature is painted in the margin of each page, which does not have a full page miniature. Each Old Testament miniature has a caption in Old French. This marginal series forms a secondary book, a Bible moralisée. Several folios are missing; the manuscript originally had 15 full page miniatures. The four missing full color pages are: The Nativity; The Adoration of the Magi; the first page of the Penitential Psalms, usually depicting King David; and the first page of the Fifteen Joys of the Virgin, usually depicting the Virgin.

=== Contents ===
The Book of Hours was the most popular type of personal devotional book among the laity in the later Middle Ages. The core contents of the Book of Hours is a simplified version of the Divine Office, the daily liturgy performed by monks at the 8 canonical hours of the day. The Book of Hours allowed the lay reader to engage in an imitation of monastic devotion, without conforming to the more rigorous and severe aspects of cloistered life. The abbreviated office was supplemented by a liturgical calendar, litanies and suffrages, special prayers to intercessors and selected psalms. Particularly lavish copies might supplement the standard Hours of Cross with the Hours of the Virgin. The contents of the Book of Hours range could be personalized to a great extent, depending on the financial resources of the owner. Apart from their devotional use, in the 15th century, a finely illuminated Book of Hours also has a secondary use as an indicator of its owner's wealth and/or social standing. A lavishly illuminated, personalized copy could easily exceed the cost of a large house in this period. Each Book of Hours begins with a liturgical calendar. The feasts of important saints are inscribed in red ink, hence the term, red letter day. Each month is illustrated with a zodaical sign and a labor associated with that time of year. The particular saints included in the calendar can provide clues as to the area where the book was made, or the place where the book was intended to be used. By the beginning of the 15th century, the calendar was followed by a Gospel lesson from each of the evangelists. In The Rohan Hours, the Gospels are accompanied by evangelist portraits, showing the Four Evangelists writing as medieval scribes, and showing their symbols: John, an eagle; Luke, an ox; Matthew, an angel; and Mark, a lion.

Observing the canonical hours centered upon the recitation, or singing, of a number of psalms, which are accompanied by prayers, specified by the eight hours of the liturgical day. The core text of a Book of Hours is the Little Office of the Virgin. This series of hourly prayers was prayed to the Mother of God, who co-mediates and sanctifies the prayers to God. Two prayers, Obsecro te, "I beseech thee," and O intemerata, "O chaste one," were extremely popular. They are personal addresses to the Virgin. This was the logical place for the person, who commissioned the book, to include his or her portrait. The Latin masculine or feminine endings used in these personal prayers can provide a clue to the gender of the original owner. The Rohan Hours was intended for a male owner.

At the beginning of each hour, the artists portrayed a standard cycle of illuminations, based on the life of the Virgin. The Rohan Hours contains The Annunciation, The Visitation, The Annunciation to the Shepherds, The Presentation in the Temple, The Flight into Egypt, and The Coronation of the Virgin. The Nativity and The Adoration of the Magi from the cycle are presumed lost.

The Penitential Psalms were recited to help one resist the temptation of committing any of the Seven Deadly Sins. The prayers in the Office of the Dead were prayed to shorten the time a loved one spent in Purgatory. Supplementary texts were added to celebrate any personal patron, family saint, special circumstances, or a fortuitous event.

The Suffrages are short prayers to saints, asking them to intercede on behalf of the petitioner. The prayers were often accompanied by portraits of the saints, with the symbols or their martyrdom, or the attributes of their patronage. The Suffrages were arranged in a particular hierarchy: God, Christ, the Virgin Mary, the angels, Saint John the Baptist, apostles, martyrs, confessors, and women saints. This standard pattern of daily prayer provided the framework for the artists' efforts.

This book of hours contains:

A Calendar of feast days,
Fragments of the four Gospels,
Fragments of the Passion,
Various prayers to Christ and the Virgin,
The Five Sorrows of the Virgin,
The Little Office of the Blessed Virgin Mary,
The Seven Penitential Psalms,
Various litanies and prayers,
The Hours of the Cross,
The Hours of the Holy Spirit,
The Fifteen Joys of the Virgin,
The Seven Petitions to Our Lord,
Prayer to the True Cross,
Office of the Dead,
The Suffrages, a Memorial of the Saints, and
Stabat Mater.

On every page not occupied by a full page miniature, The Hours has a marginal scene from the Old Testament. As a whole, this series of marginal miniatures forms a secondary book, a Bible moralisée. Each marginal miniature depicts an Old Testament scene that is somehow related to the principal New Testament picture on the same page. The purpose of the marginal scene was to show how the Old Testament paved the way for that particular New Testament scene, according to the theological theory called typology. Some marginal scene captions are mere descriptions of the biblical vignette. Other captions contain a moralization or short explanation of the moral of the scene, for the spiritual education of the reader; hence the name, Bible moralisée.

The Hours ends abruptly at the Stabat Mater. Either the ending pages are missing, or more likely, this book of hours was never completed.

=== Text and script ===
The text is written according to the use of Paris. The principal Latin text was written in Gothic script by two scribes. The first scribe has a somewhat unskilled hand; the second has a clear, elegant Parisian hand. The calendar text was written in red, gold, and blue ink, depending on the particular feast. The Gospels were written in alternating lines in blue, gold, and red inks. The text specific to the liturgical hours was written in Latin with black, and rarely blue, ink. In the margins, the Bible moralisée is written in Old French with black ink.

The Latin prayers have masculine endings. Even though this book was commissioned by a woman, it was meant for use by a man.

=== Decoration ===
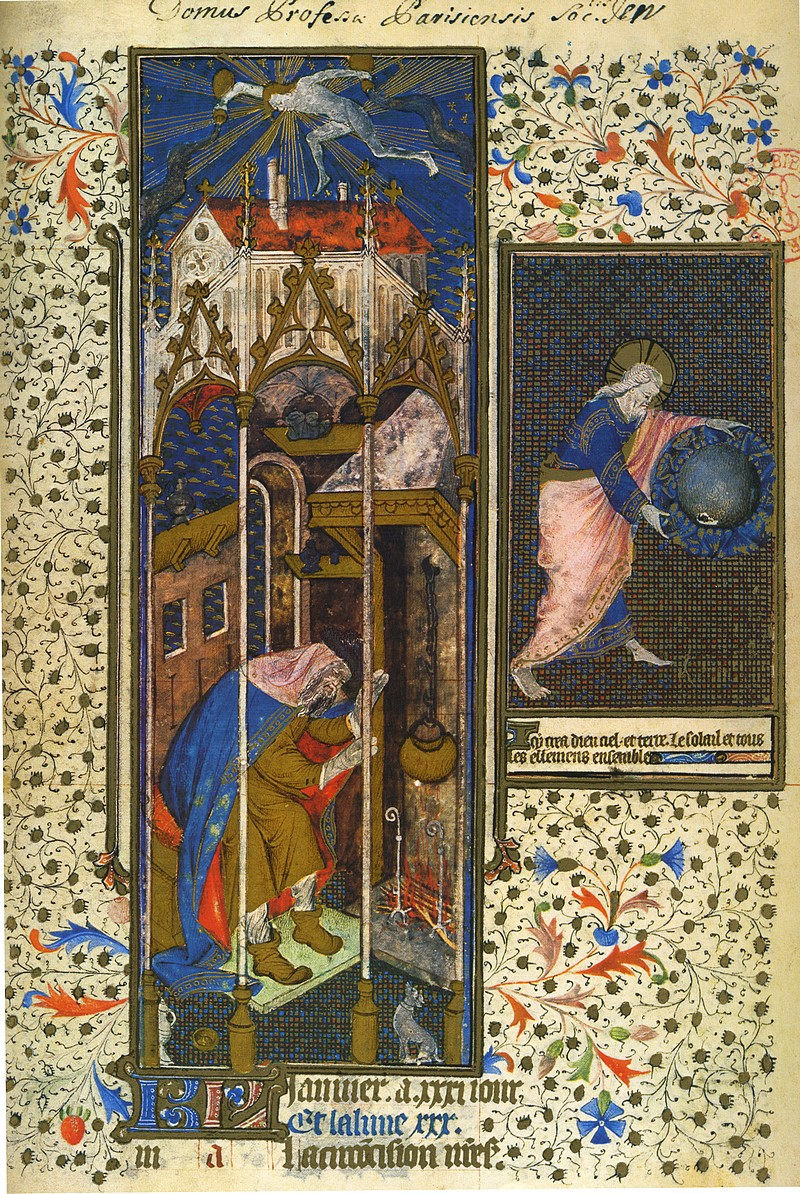
January from the calendar

These volumes come from a period when Books of Hours were produced for their artistic and decorative effect. The Master's border decorations are delicate, foliate motifs reminiscent of the Anjou family's Bible moralisée. The miniatures are stylistically similar to those of the Grandes Heures and the Belles Heures, which Yolande purchased from her brother-in-law, the Duke de Berry's estate, after his death in 1416. The dark and dramatic tone of The Hours may reflect the tragic defeat of the French at Battle of Agincourt, 25 October 1415.

The Rohan Master broke with convention by portraying the unexpected and the shocking. He illuminates the calendar in vertical boxes, which normally would contain the calendar text. In The Resurrection (f. 159, Pl. 61), the Master unexpectedly depicts Christ, identified by the wounds of his Passion, as an aged man on a rainbow. Perhaps, this was his attempt to show the Trinity in a new and different way. In The Coronation of the Virgin (f. 106v., Pl. 54), the coronation is not conducted by Christ, as was usually the case; rather, she is received by God the Father, while his angels honor her by reciting from the liturgy of the Feast of the Assumption. The Master shows the glorious Resurrection of the Dead in a shocking way. The faithful are resurrected in the same state in which they had died: feeble infant, maiden, and infirm elder. This contradicts the 15th-century expectation that every Christian would be resurrected in a young, strong, beautiful body—in the prime of life.

The Master's flat landscapes and background are unconventional. The Master and his assistants did not take much interest in the developing depiction of three-dimensional space and naturalistic lighting found in most of the best quality manuscripts of this date. The Master was not interested in depicting realistic scenes. The backgrounds provide a stage for his emotionally expressive figures. Many seemingly plain blue backgrounds upon closer examination show a flurry of activity as a multitude of angels are discovered delicately traced in gold. He portrays profound emotions by using intense colors, comparing motion with stasis, and contrasting lean and plump figures. By contrasting beauty and joy with ugliness and pain, the Rohan Master creates a unique and dramatic spiritual art. The epitome of the Master's art is the Lamentation of the Virgin (f. 135, Pl. 57) from the Hours of the Cross section, of The Rohan Hours. The grieving Virgin cannot be consoled by Apostle John, who looks up in consternation at a saddened God.

The marginal Bible moralisée subject matter and treatment were based on a book in the possession of Yolande of Aragon, Duchess of Anjou. Her husband, Louis II of Anjou, brought a Bible moralisée from Naples, but it was probably made in Bologna. It is known as the Angevin Bible (Bibliothèque Nationale, MS. fr. 9561). There is no doubt the Rohan atelier assistants charged with decorating the margins used the Duke's book as their model. Not only was the subject matter copied from the Angevin Bible, but the errors in the captions were copied, too.

=== Reproductions ===
In 1973, the publisher, George Braziller, produced a partial facsimile. All the miniatures are reproduced in full color with gold. Millard Meiss provided an artistic and historical Introduction to the manuscript. The facsimile pages were accompanied with notes and commentaries by Marcel Thomas. This book was issued as a 247-page crimson cloth hardback.

In 1994, the publisher, George Braziller, released a 248-page, hardback edition. ISBN 0-8076-1358-4

In 2006, a complete color facsimile bound in leather, issued with a separate 377-page commentary in Spanish (Grandes Horas de Rohan) was produced by A y N Ediciones, Madrid, Spain. ISBN 84-934054-5-0
