= Château de la Guerche =

Castle in Centre-Val de Loire, France

Coordinates: 46°53′2″N 0°43′48″E

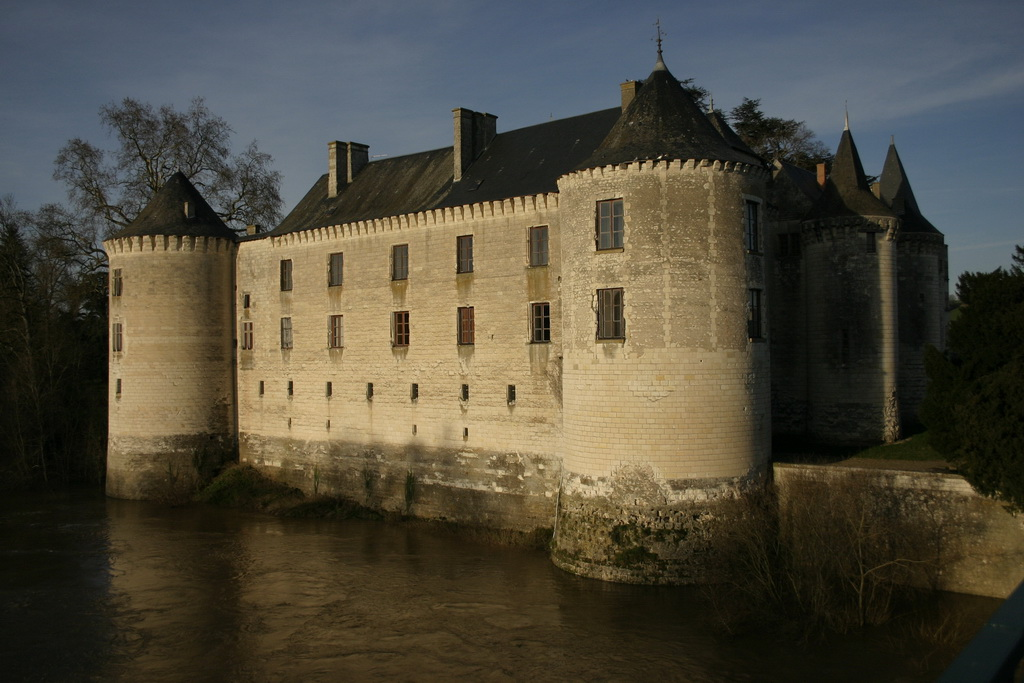
Château de la Guerche along the river Creuse

Château de la Guerche is a castle in La Guerche, in Indre-et-Loire, a département in France.

It was built during the reign of Charles VII of France, for Antoinette de Maignelais, young cousin of Charles's recently defunct mistress Agnès Sorrel, and her new husband André de Villequier.

The castle was besieged in 1592, during the French Wars of Religion. Restored in the seventeenth century and renovated subsequently, it is now open to visitors.

It has been listed since 1944 as a monument historique by the French Ministry of Culture.

== See also ==
- List of castles in France
