= Château de Suscinio =

Breton castle in Morbihan, France

Coordinates: 47°30′46″N 2°43′46″W

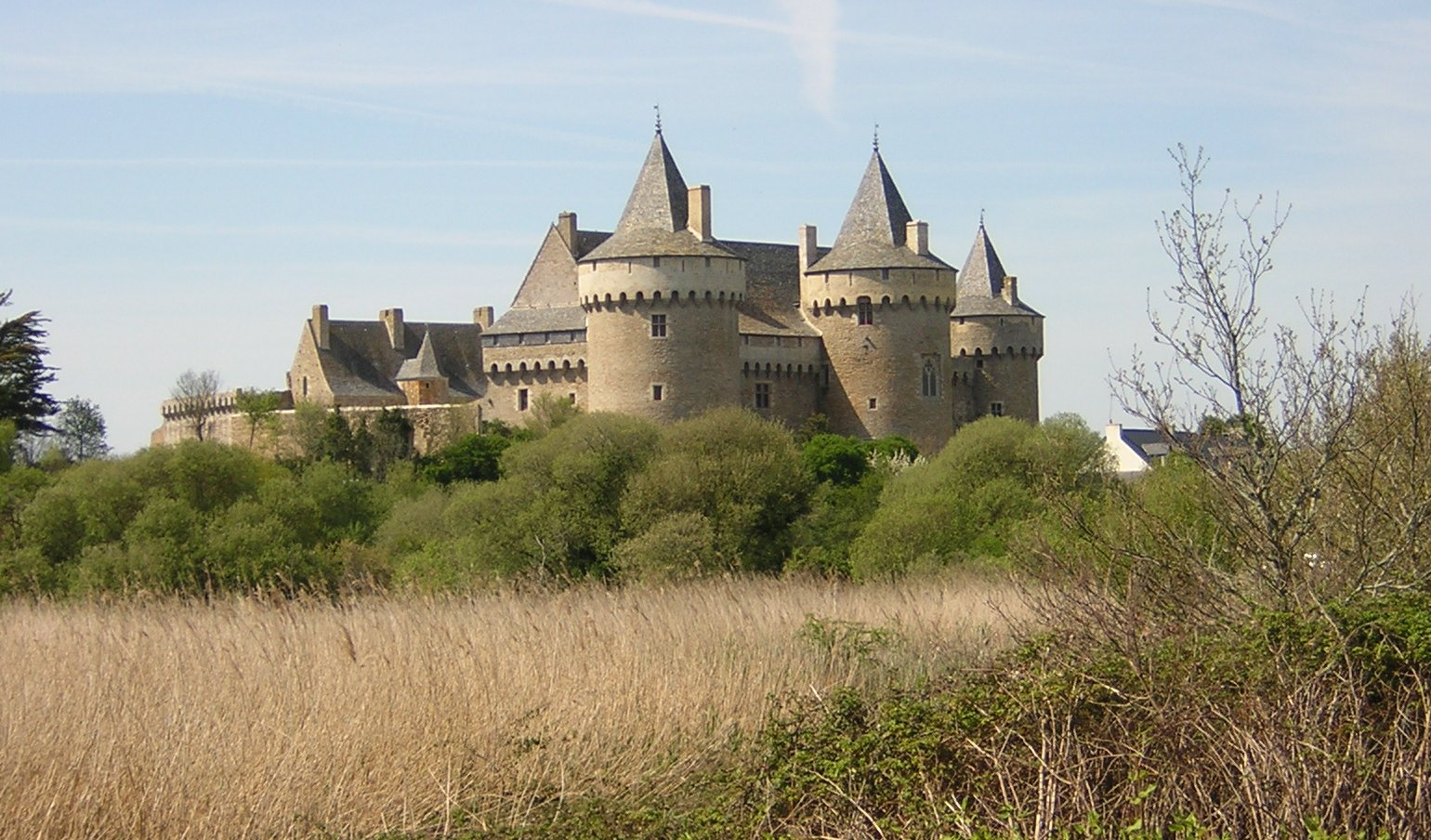
The Château de Suscinio: general view from the beach. Note the two large towers of the gatehouse

Aerial view from the east

The Château de Suscinio or de Susinio is a Breton castle, built in the late Middle Ages, to be the residence of the Dukes of Brittany. It is located in the commune of Sarzeau in the département of Morbihan, near the coast along the Bay of Biscay. The spectacular site comprises the moated castle, a ruined chapel, a dovecote, and a few ruined outbuildings.

== History ==
Designed to be a place of leisure, between the seaside and a forest full of game for hunting, the castle's first logis seigneurial (seigniorial house) dates from the beginning of the 13th century.

The castle was fortified and enlarged at the end of the 14th century, when the heirs of the duchy had to fight to keep their assets (Brittany was not yet fully united with France and did not become so until 1514). After the castle was taken by Bertrand du Guesclin, the infamous Constable of France, John V and John VI constructed a new seigniorial residence block with a large, new corner tower known as the Tour Neuve. A casemate was added at the end of the 15th century to protect artillery pieces.

== Suscinio and the Wars of the Roses ==
From 1471 to 1484, the castle housed Jasper Tudor, Henry Tudor (later King Henry VII of England), and the core of their group of exiled Lancastrians, numbering about 500 by 1483. Since the castle could only house some 100 persons, the rest must have been billeted close about, in Kermoizin and other villages nearby.

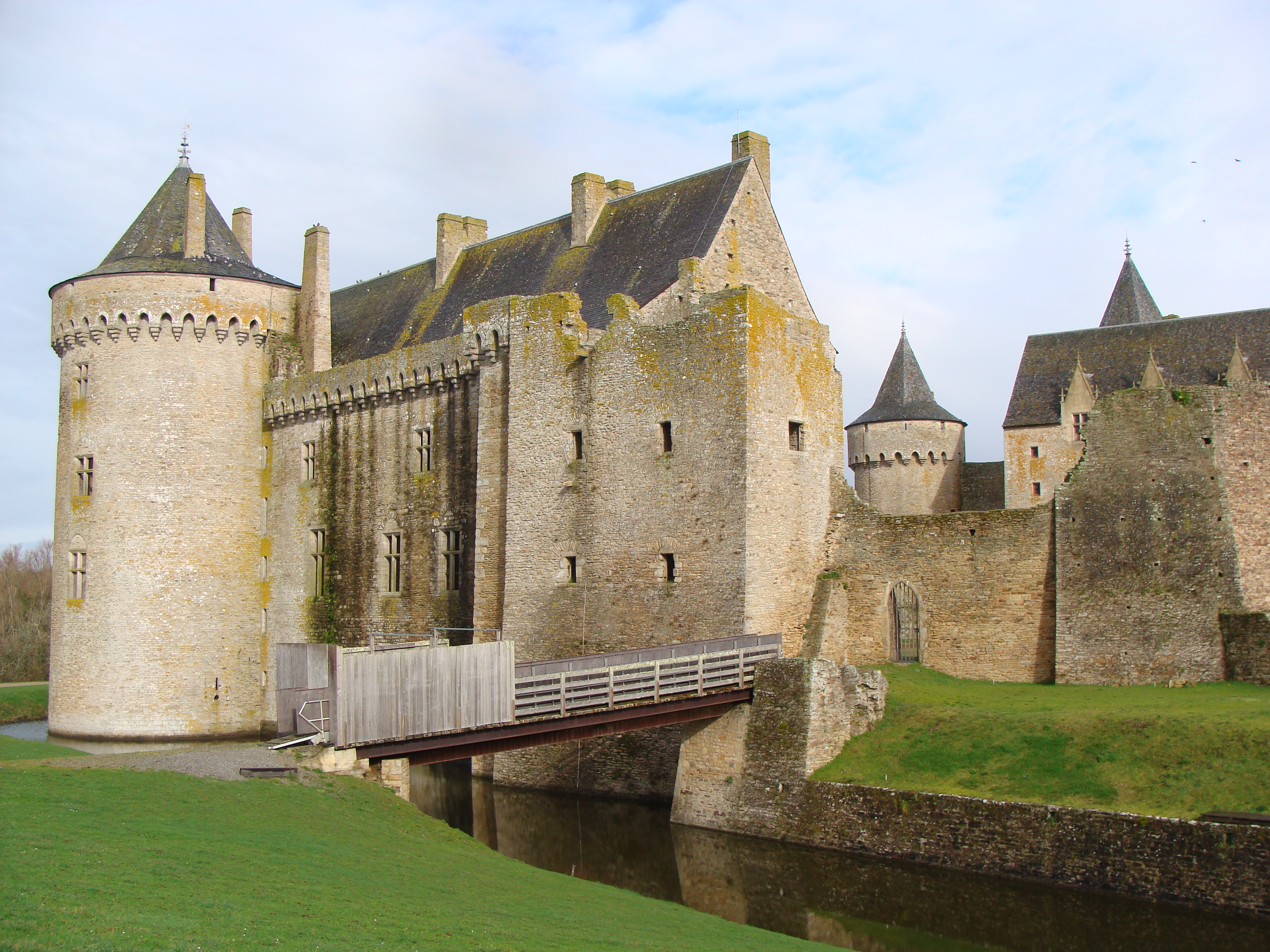
The castle from across the moat

Francis II, Duke of Brittany supported this group of exiled Englishmen, against all the Plantagenet demands that he should surrender them. For 11 years, Suscinio was an armed camp, alert against any attempt to kidnap Jasper and Henry and return them to England where they were under attainder and would have been promptly executed as threats to the Yorkist rule.

Duke Francis II supported the failed Lancastrian rebellion and invasion of England in 1483 with 40,000 gold crowns, 15,000 soldiers, and a fleet of transport ships. When the Duke suffered from one of his periods of incapacitating illness, his treasurer, Pierre Landais, agreed to surrender Henry Tudor to the representatives of the Yorkist King Richard III of England, in return for a pledge of 3,000 English archers to defend Brittany against a threatened French attack. News of this plot by Landais reached the exiled Lancastrians just in time for both the Tudors to separately escape, hours ahead of Landais' soldiers, across the nearby border into France, where they were received at the court of King Charles VIII of France.

Shortly thereafter, when Duke Francis II regained his faculties, he offered the 400 remaining Lancastrians, still at and around Suscinio, safe conduct into France and even paid for their expenses. This may have been the last official use of the castle by the Breton Dukes. Duke Francis II died in 1488, and was succeeded by his 11-year-old daughter, Anne of Brittany, last ruling Duchess of Brittany, and twice Queen of France. She died in 1514 and Brittany lost its autonomy, becoming part of France.

The castle was then slowly abandoned by the aristocracy. In the early 16th century, the former great hall of the 14th century, along the northern curtain-wall, was destroyed. The castle was then confiscated by the French crown under King Francis I of France who offered it to one of his mistresses. In 1795, Suscinio was temporarily occupied by the royalists coming from Quiberon and heading to the north of Morbihan. Written off in the 17th and 18th centuries, the castle was used off-and-on as a stone quarry until the French Revolution.

During the Revolution, it was sold to a merchant who continued to sell the stones, and it soon after fell into even greater ruin.

== The restoration ==
The Department of Morbihan bought it in 1965 from the family of Jules de Francheville, who had attempted to preserve and restore the castle, and began the restoration in earnest. The remains of a ducal chapel was found in the vicinity outside of the moats; its remarkable tiled floor has been carefully removed and restored and is now exhibited in a hall of the castle.

Nowadays, Suscinio Castle has again regained its allure of an intact medieval fortress, but major restoration work continues.

The castle may be unique in Western Europe because of its restoration to its presumed late-15th-century condition; because many other medieval fortresses made obsolete by the use of cannon in warfare were either dismantled or modernised to become "comfortable country houses". Today, few other medieval fortresses remain, structurally, as they were at the height of their late-medieval strength and power; and in this lies the particular interest of the Château de Suscinio.

Exhibitions and summer events attract many people. Since 1840, the castle has been listed as a monument historique by the French Ministry of Culture.

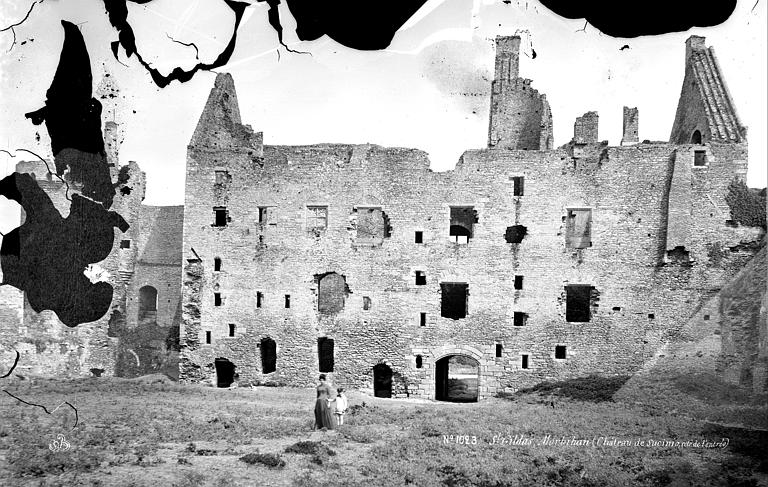
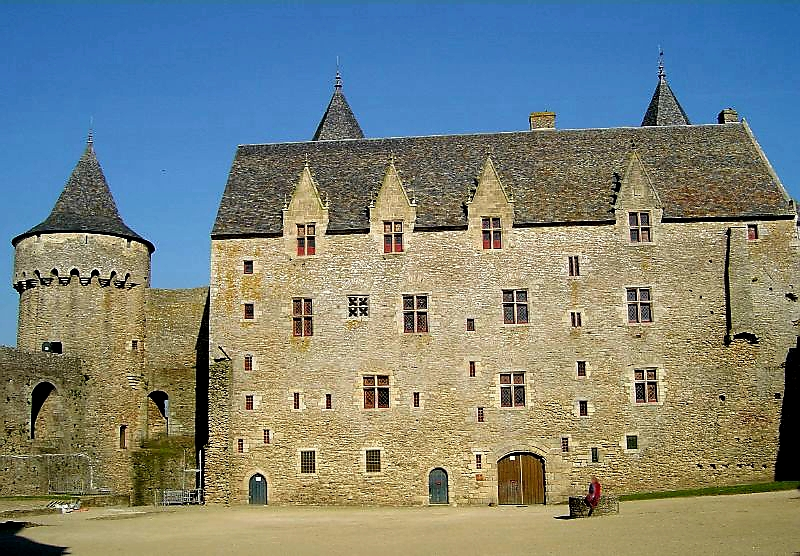
The courtyard and restored inner façade of the large 15th-century gatehouse (right) and how it appeared in the 19th century, prior to restoration (left)
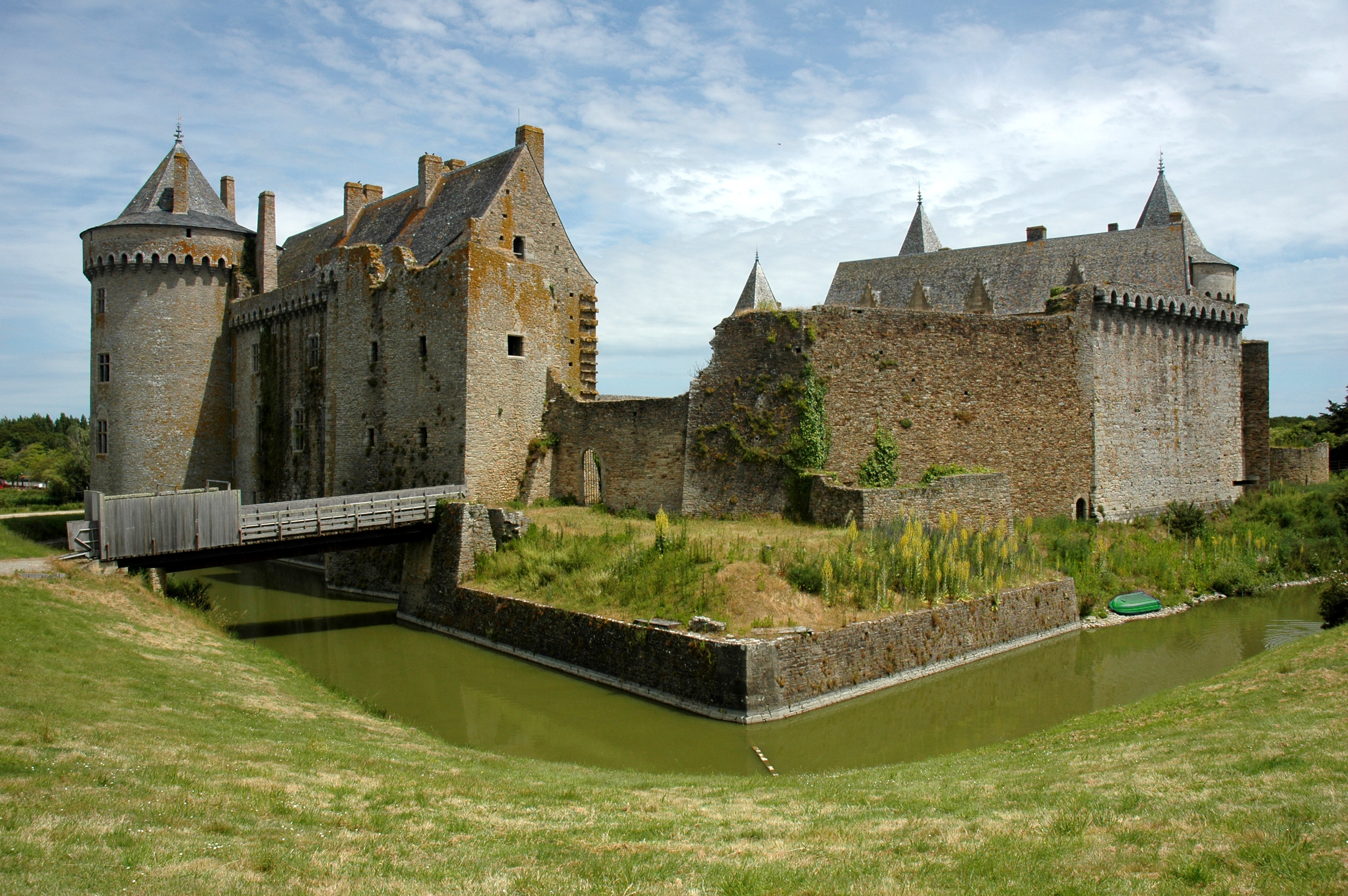

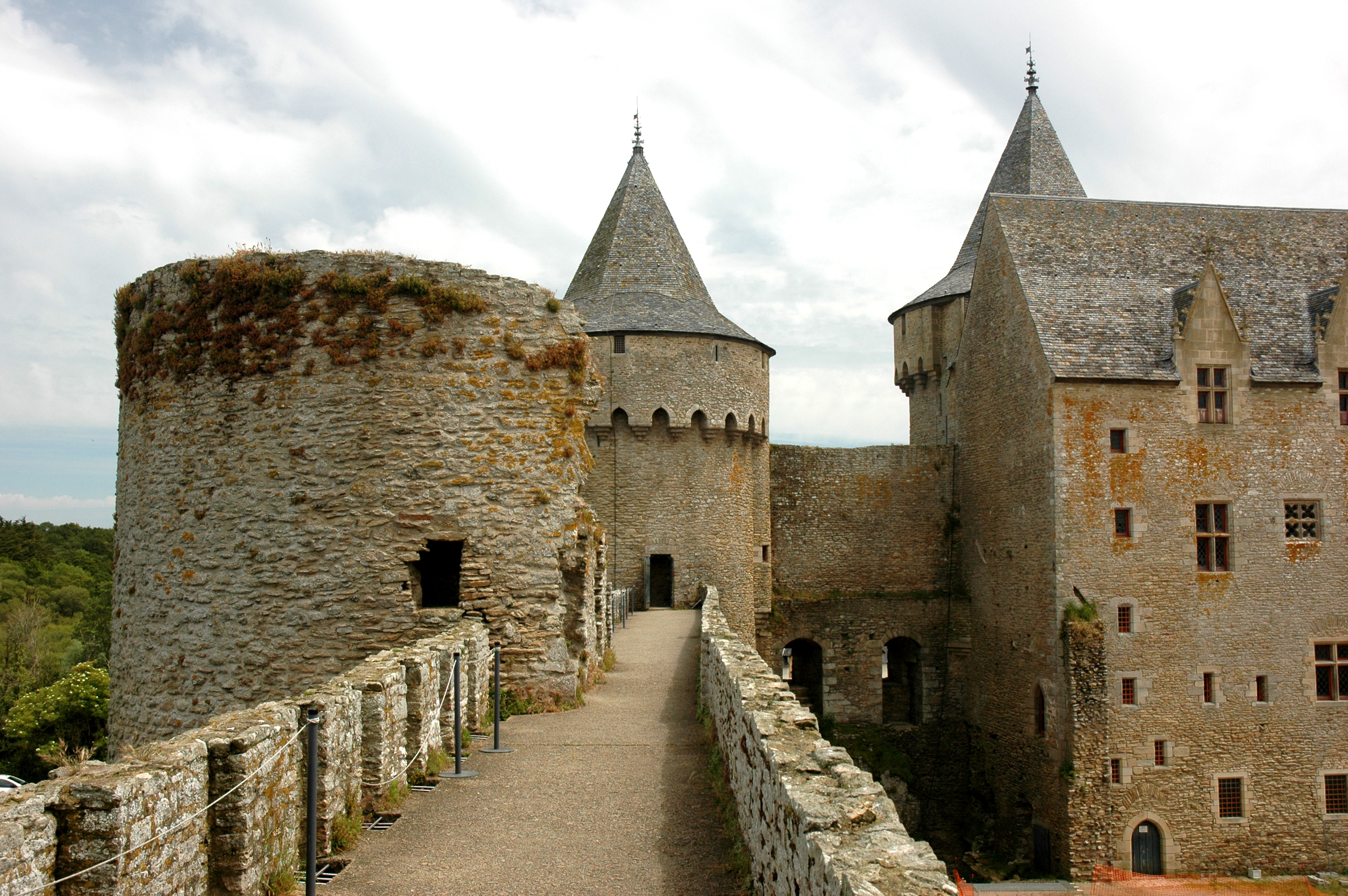

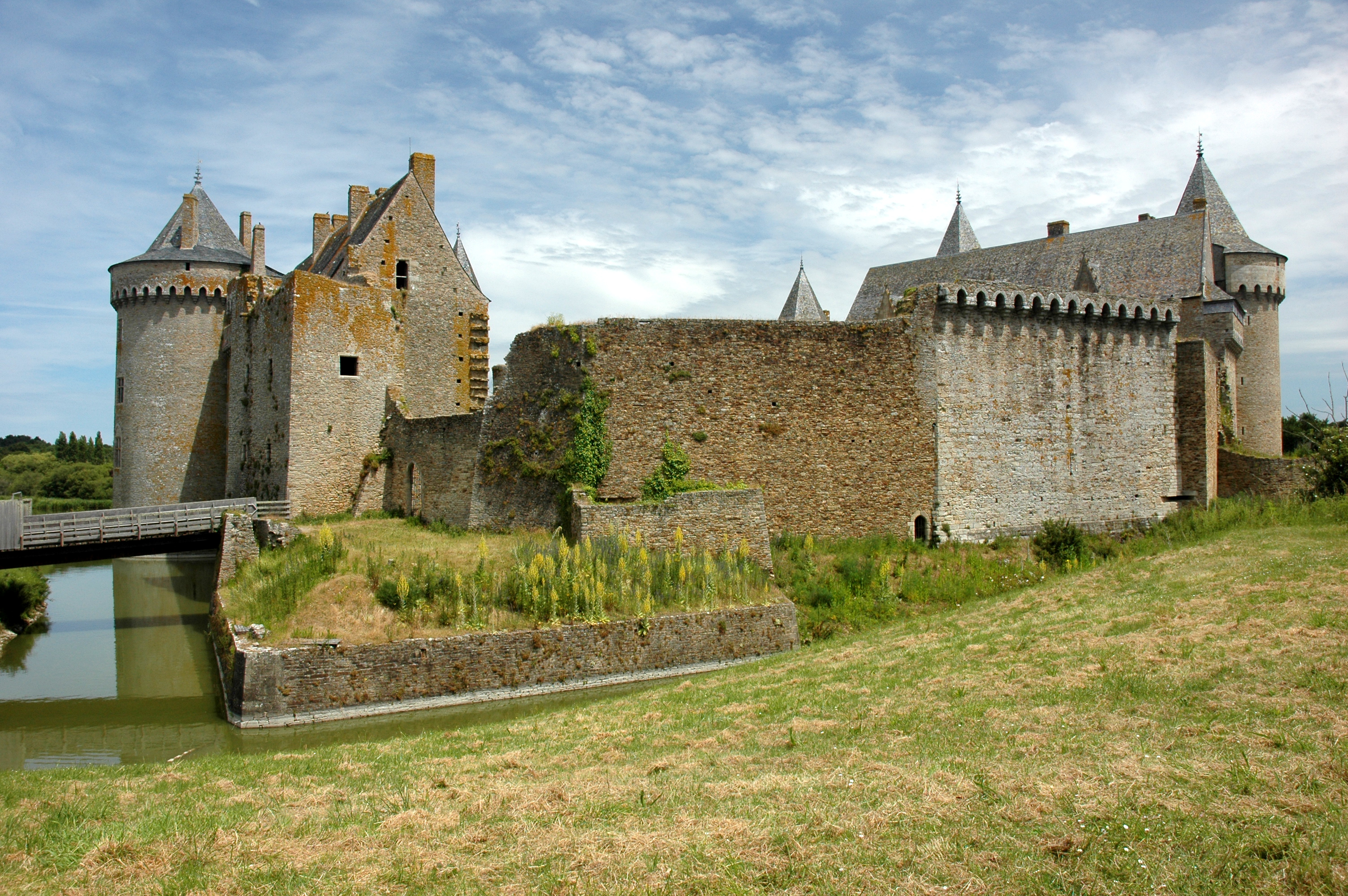

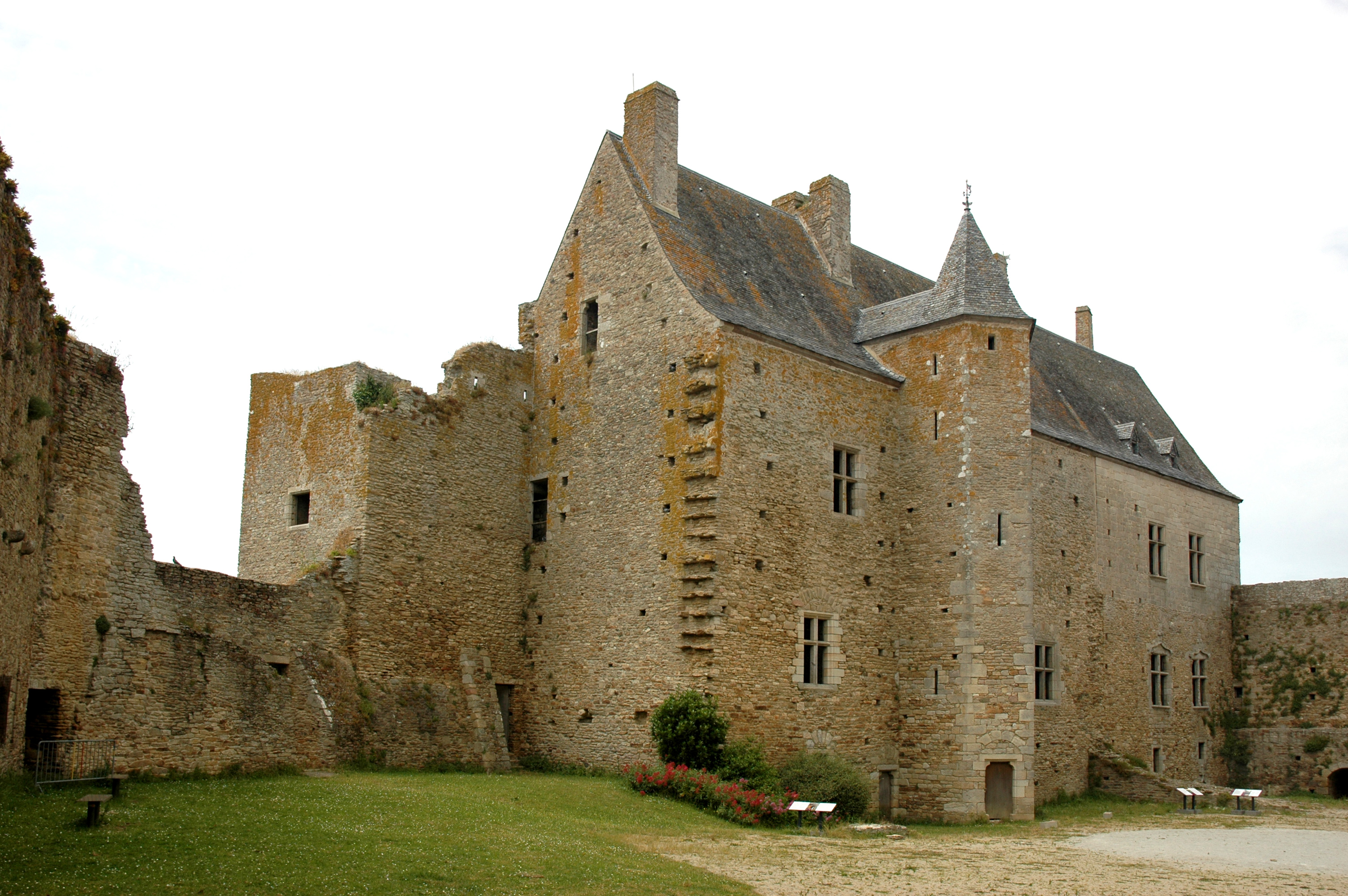

== See also ==
- List of castles in France
