= Pierre Landais =

Breton politician

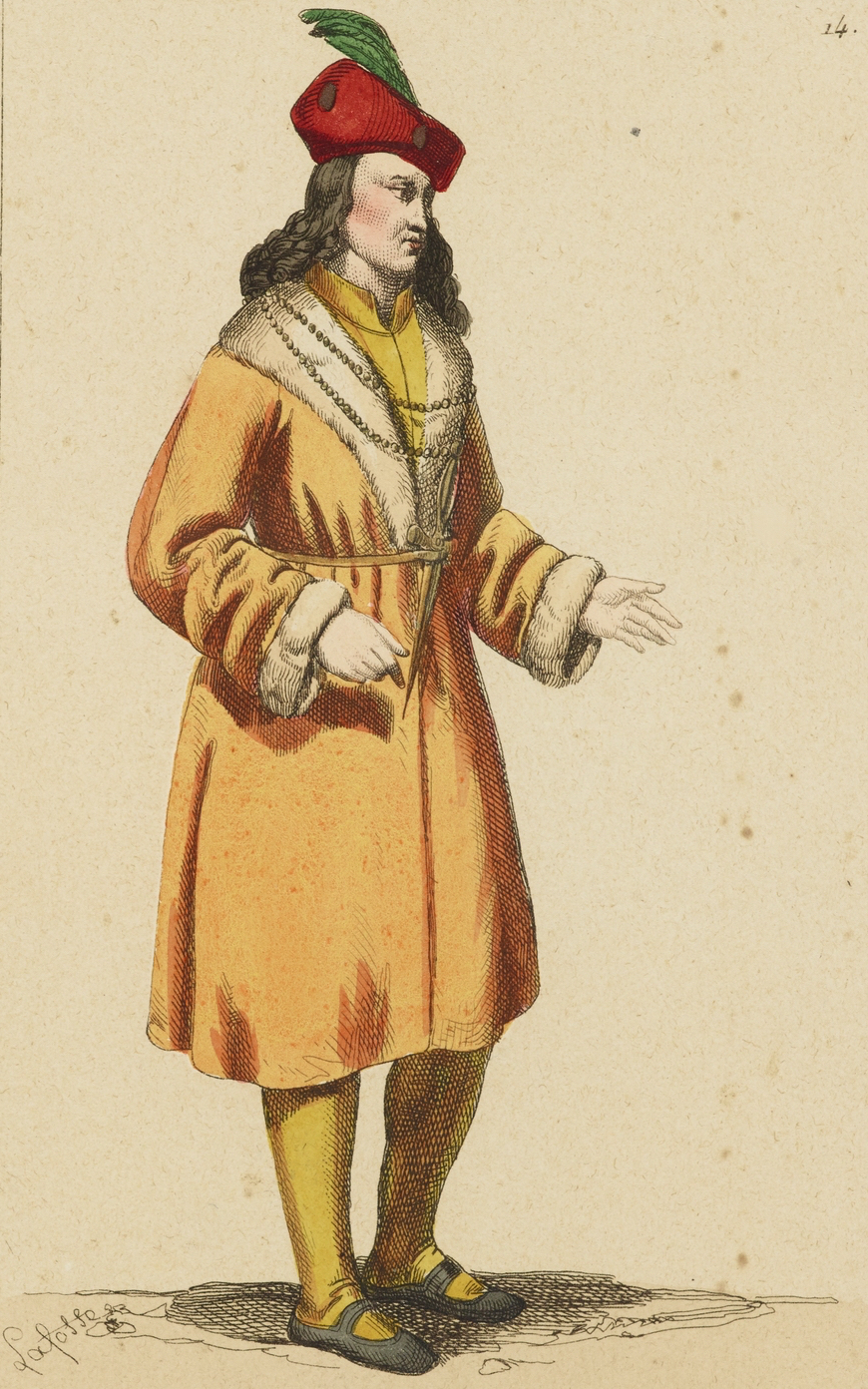
- Born: 1430
- Died: 1485 (aged 54–55)
- Occupation: Politician (Treasurer-General of the Duchy of Brittany)
- Years active: 1477-1485

Pierre Landais (French pronunciation: [pjɛʁ lɑ̃dɛ]; 1430–1485) was a Breton politician who became the principal adviser and chief minister to Francis II, Duke of Brittany. Francis left Landais in control of the affairs of the duchy, producing resentment among local barons, who finally secured the overthrow of Landais' régime. The rise and fall of Landais undermined Francis' position and prepared the way for the annexation of Brittany by France.

Landais is also important for the key role he played during attempts by the Yorkist kings of England to extradite the leading Lancastrian contender for the English throne, Henry Tudor, who was living in Brittany with his principal supporters. Initially a supporter of Henry, he later turned against him.

== Biography ==
=== Early career ===
Landais was the son of rich clothiers from Vitré. He entered the service of Duke as a valet de garde-robe. His ambition and acumen soon brought him favour with Francis, and he rose to become Treasurer and Receiver General of Brittany. He promoted the interests of the bourgeoisie, and encouraged trade and enterprise.

Landais soon came into conflict with Guillaume Chauvin, who was chancellor of Brittany, and who resented Landais' influence over the duke. In 1477, his rivalry with Chauvin reached a head. Landais managed to ensure Chauvin's arrest and dismissal on corruption charges, securing his own position as de facto prime minister under Francis. During this period he encouraged the expansion of the University of Nantes, founded by duke Francis in 1460.

=== Régime ===
All-powerful between 1481 and 1485, he strove to defend the independence of the duchy against the machinations of Louis XI, the King of France, engaging in secret negotiations with King Edward IV of England. Landais also negotiated trade agreements with Spain, Portugal, England and the Hanseatic cities. He further promoted silk and tapestry production. After the death of Louis, he attempted to marry Francis' heir Anne of Brittany to the Duke of Orleans.

Landais had Guillaume Chauvin moved from prison to prison, resisting pressure to release him. Chauvin died on 5 April 1484, allegedly from starvation and abuse. Chauvin's ill treatment caused outrage among the Breton aristocracy, who were already disturbed by Landais' power. Encouraged by Anne of Beaujeu, regent of France, his enemies organised a coup against him. Led by John IV of Chalon-Arlay, Prince of Orange, an armed gang attempted to capture Landais, but he escaped. The duke ordered that the property of the conspirators against Landais should be confiscated. The rebels were forced into exile.

=== Henry Tudor ===
Still enjoying the support of the duke, Landais engaged in negotiations with supporters of Henry Tudor, Earl of Richmond, Lancastrian claimant to the throne of England, who was living in exile in Brittany, occupying the Château de Suscinio, Sarzeau, as guests of Duke Francis. Naval conflicts has arisen with England following the accession of King Richard III in 1483. English privateers were attacking Breton ships. Landais initially attempted to appease Richard, but later switched his support to Henry in the hope that he would overthrow Richard, thus producing an alliance between England and Brittany. However, the plot failed, and Henry was forced to return to Brittany. Landais made overtures to Richard once more. The king offered to send 4,000 English and Welsh archers to help secure the Duke's power against the rebel Breton nobility, who were continuing to plot against Landais. In return, Landais was to arrange the capture and extradition of Henry, his uncle Jasper Tudor, and the other exiled Lancastrians.

Duke Francis had pledged to support Henry, but he was seriously ill at this time and Landais had complete control of the government. He assembled an armed force in Rennes, to march to Vannes and capture all of the Lancastrians, who by this time numbered around 300, including many experienced soldiers. Henry was informed of the plot. Facing arrest and extradition to England, Henry and Jasper fled across the nearest border into Anjou, crossing only hours ahead of Landais' troops. Henry took the road towards Angers, en route for the French Court at Langeais, and secured French support for his later successful campaign against Richard. When Duke Francis recovered, he was furious with Landais, and allowed Henry's followers to leave Brittany and to join him.

=== Overthrow and death ===
Landais' machinations only increased the number of his aristocratic enemies, who were supported by Anne of Beaujeu. By 1485 the pro-French faction had organised an army of supporters. Landais' enemies arrived at Nantes at the head of this army on 25 June 1485. The duke was forced to deliver Landais to be tried for various alleged crimes. He was accused of extortion and causing the death of Chauvin. Under torture, he confessed to numerous misdeeds. Tried and sentenced, Pierre Landais was hanged on 19 July 1485 in the meadow of Biesse in Nantes.

== Legacy and reputation ==
Landais' only child with his wife Jeanne was a daughter, Françoise. She inherited his estates. Her son became a bishop.

The coup exposed the weakness of Duke Francis, which was soon exploited by Anne of Beaujeu, resulting in a full-scale French invasion of Brittany in 1488.

The English chronicler Raphael Holinshed described Landais (who he calls "Peter Landois") as "a man both of pregnant wit and great authority, [who] ruled and adjudged all things at his pleasure and commandement, for which cause (as men set in authority be not best beloved) he excited and provoked against him the malice and evil will of the nobility of Britaine [Brittany]". Also as Peter Landois he appears as a character in the Elizabethan play The True Tragedy of Richard III, which influenced Shakespeare's Richard III. He is inaccurately included among Henry Tudor's loyal allies before the Battle of Bosworth.

According to Arthur Le Moyne de La Borderie French historians of the ancien regime were generally very negative in their estimation of him. He says "the old historians were very hostile to Landais. Alain Bouchart (who wrote around thirty years after the death of the treasurer-general) represents him as 'a person of a little wisdom and of base extraction'". De la Borderie quotes D'Agentré, who says Landais was a virtual dictator, "no-one could get anything except through him: estates, offices, benefices, hung on his whims...His position made him so arrogant and haughty that he misused princes, lords and gentry alike." Dom Lobineau claimed that he became the chief minister after facilitating the "secret pleasures" of the Duke. Such views became less common after the Revolution. De la Borderie argues that the hostility is partly aristocratic distaste for parvenus and partly because Landais sought an alliance with England against France.
