= Francis II of Brittany =

Duke of Brittany from 1458 to 1488

Francis II
- Sculpture of Francis II on his tomb in Nantes

Duke of Brittany
- Reign: 26 December 1458 – 9 September 1488
- Coronation: 3 February 1459
- Predecessor: Arthur III
- Successor: Anne
- Born: 23 June 1433; Château de Clisson, Nantes, Brittany
- Died: 9 September 1488 (aged 55); Couëron
- Burial: Nantes Cathedral
- Spouses: Margaret of Brittany (m. 1455; died 1469) Margaret of Foix (m. 1471)
- Issue: John, Count of Montfort; Anne, Duchess of Brittany; Isabeau of Brittany
- House: Dreux-Montfort
- Father: Richard, Count of Étampes
- Mother: Margaret, Countess of Étampes

Coat of Arms of Francis II, Duke of Brittany

Francis II (Breton: Frañsez II, French: François II) (23 June 1433 – 9 September 1488) was Duke of Brittany from 1458 to his death. He was the grandson of John IV, Duke of Brittany. A recurring theme in Francis' life would be his quest to maintain the quasi-independence of Brittany from France. As such, his reign was characterized by conflicts with King Louis XI and with his daughter, Anne of France, who served as regent during the minority of her brother, King Charles VIII. The armed and unarmed conflicts from 1465 to 1477 and 1484–1488 have been called the "War of the Public Weal" and the Mad War (la Guerre Folle), respectively.

== Early life ==
Francis was born on 23 June 1433 to Richard of Brittany, Count of Étampes (1395–1438) and his wife, Margaret of Orléans, Countess of Vertus (1406–1466). Richard of Brittany was the youngest son of Duke John IV of Brittany. Richard's older brothers, John V and Arthur III, both succeeded their father as duke, but upon Arthur's death in 1458 (John V's sons Francis I and Peter II died in 1450 and 1457 respectively, without sons), the only legitimate male heir was his nephew Francis.

== Relationship with English royalty ==
=== Protector of the House of Lancaster ===
Francis unexpectedly became the protector of England's House of Lancaster in exile from 1471 to 1484. During the latter half of the 15th century, civil war existed in England as the House of York and House of Lancaster fought each other for the English throne. In 1471, the Yorkists defeated their rivals in the battles of Barnet and Tewkesbury. The Lancastrian king, Henry VI, and his only son, Edward of Westminster, died in the aftermath of the Battle of Tewkesbury. Their deaths left the House of Lancaster with no direct claimants to the throne. Subsequently, the Yorkist king, Edward IV, was in complete control of England. He attainted those who refused to submit to his rule, such as Jasper Tudor and his nephew Henry Tudor (later King Henry VII), naming them as traitors and confiscating their lands.

Francis gained custody over the Tudors when they tried to flee to France but strong winds in the English Channel forced them to land at Le Conquet in Brittany. Henry Tudor, the only remaining Lancastrian noble with a trace of royal bloodline, had a weak claim to the throne, and King Edward IV regarded him as "a nobody". However, Francis viewed Henry as a valuable bargaining tool for England's aid, when in conflicts with France, and therefore kept the Tudors under his protection. He housed Jasper Tudor, Henry Tudor, and the core of their group of exiled Lancastrians at the Château de Suscinio in Sarzeau, where they remained for 11 years. There, Francis generously supported this group of exiled Englishmen against all the Plantagenet demands that he should surrender them.

In October 1483, Henry Tudor launched a failed invasion of England from Brittany. Francis supported this invasion by providing 40,000 gold crowns, 15,000 soldiers, and a fleet of transport ships. Henry's fleet of 15 chartered vessels was scattered by a storm, and his ship reached the coast of England in company with only one other vessel. Henry realised that the soldiers on shore were the men of the new Yorkist king, Richard III of England, and so he decided to abandon the invasion and return to Brittany. As for Henry's main conspirator in England, Henry Stafford, 2nd Duke of Buckingham, he was convicted of treason and beheaded on 2 November 1483, way before Henry's ships landed in England. For Henry's conspiracy against King Richard III had been unravelled, and without the Duke of Buckingham or Henry Tudor, the rebellion was easily crushed.

Survivors of the failed uprising then fled to Brittany, where they openly supported Henry Tudor's claim to the throne. On Christmas Day in 1483 at the Rennes Cathedral, Henry swore an oath to marry King Edward IV's daughter, Elizabeth of York, and thus unite the warring houses of York and Lancaster. Henry's rising prominence made him a great threat to King Richard III, and the Yorkist king made several overtures to Duke Francis II to surrender the young Lancastrian. Francis refused, holding out for the possibility of better terms from the King. In mid-1484, Francis was incapacitated by one of his periods of illness, and while recuperating, his treasurer, Pierre Landais, took over the reins of government. Landais reached an agreement with King Richard III to send Henry and his uncle Jasper back to England in exchange for a pledge of 3,000 English archers to defend Brittany against a threatened French attack. John Morton, a bishop of Flanders, learnt of the scheme and warned the Tudors in time. The Tudors then managed to escape separately, hours ahead of Landais' soldiers, across the nearby border into France. They were received at the court of King Charles VIII of France, who allowed them to stay and provided them with resources. Shortly afterwards, when Francis had recovered, he offered the 400 remaining Lancastrians, still at and around the Château de Suscinio, safe-conduct into France and even paid for their expenses. For the French, the Tudors were useful pawns to ensure that King Richard III did not interfere with French plans to acquire Brittany. Thus, the loss of the Lancastrians seriously played against the interests of Francis II. (Note: On 16 March 1485, Richard's queen, Anne Neville, died, and rumours spread across the country that she was murdered to pave the way for Richard to marry his niece, Elizabeth. The gossip alienated Richard from some of his northern supporters, and upset Henry across the English Channel. The loss of Elizabeth's hand in marriage could unravel the alliance between Henry's supporters who were Lancastrians and those who were loyalists to Edward IV. Anxious to secure his bride, Henry assembled approximately 2,000 men and set sail from France on 1 August. Henry's second successful invasion of England ended with his victory at the Battle of Bosworth Field.)

== Relationship with French royalty ==
=== King Louis XI ===
Louis XI was renowned as a cunning adversary and a master at diplomacy, if not the military arts. His contemporary nickname was "The Universal Spider," reflecting his constant political plotting.

Francis became a member of the League of the Public Weal. (Note: League of the Public Weal in French is La ligue du Bien public) This was an alliance of feudal nobles organized in 1465 in defiance of the centralized authority of King Louis XI of France, whose declared aim was to enlarge the French royal domain by annexing all of the duchies – Burgundy, Berry, Normandy, Orléans, Brittany, etc. It was masterminded by Charles the Bold, Count of Charolais, son of the Duke of Burgundy, with the king's brother Charles, Duke of Berry, as a figurehead.

In 1467 Charles the Bold inherited the Duchy of Burgundy, which held fiefs in France that included the counties of Artois and Flanders, and the Imperial lands of Holland, Brabant, and Luxembourg. As Duke of Burgundy, Charles aspired to forge a kingdom of his own between France and Germany, approximating the former domains of the Frankish Emperor Lothair I. But Charles was killed in 1477 at the Battle of Nancy against René II, Duke of Lorraine and a hired army of Swiss mercenaries, and Louis was saved from his greatest adversary. The great Duchy of Burgundy was then absorbed into the Kingdom of France, and the League of the Public Weal was essentially defeated, although several members would re-ally for the Mad War in 1485.

The fortunes of Francis and Brittany would continue to deteriorate after Louis XI's death in 1483, as his daughter Anne of France would serve as regent for putative successor Charles VIII.

=== Regency of Anne of France ===
Francis was anxious to maintain his duchy's autonomy during the minority of Charles VIII of France. He aligned himself with Louis, the Duke of Orléans (the future Louis XII) and Charles, Count of Angoulême, against the regency of Anne of France. She had been pursuing the same underhand politics towards Brittany as her father Louis XI.

In focusing on relations with his neighbour France, however, Francis II neglected his own realm. His corrupt and oppressive chancellor, Guillaume Chauvin, who was overthrown by treasurer general Pierre Landais in 1477, died in prison on 5 April 1484. A large part of the nobility had been bribed by Anne and Charles and supported them in their eagerness to subjugate Brittany. These nobles performed a coup d'état ousting Landais, who was eventually hanged in 1485.

In 1486, the Estates of Brittany confirmed Francis' daughter Anne and heir and successor to further assure the Duchy's autonomy from France. The Treaty of Chateaubriant was signed with France in 1487 and reaffirmed Brittany's autonomy. Despite the Treaty of Chateaubriant, however, the French continued to harass the Duchy. Under the leadership of Louis II de la Trémoille, the French royal army struck against Vannes and Fougères, controlling access to Brittany.

==== La Guerre Folle (The Mad War) ====
Francis then allied with Maximilian I, Holy Roman Emperor, against France. Alain d'Albret, a rebel lord, believing he would marry Francis' daughter Anne, reinforced the Breton army with 5000 troops supplied by the king of Spain. Maximilian I of Austria also sent 1500 men, and Edward Woodville, Lord Scales, brought over a force of archers from Britain. Francis, however, was defeated on 28 July 1488 in the Battle of Saint-Aubin-du-Cormier. This battle also destroyed the power-base of the warring noble leaders as Edward Woodville was killed, and Louis of Orléans and John IV of Chalon-Arlay were captured. Alain d'Albret and the Maréchal de Rieux succeeded in escaping, and played an important part in continuing the conflict.

A few days later, on 10 August, Francis was forced to sign the Treaty of Verger. Under the terms of the treaty, the duke was compelled to submit himself and his duchy as a vassal of the king of France, and to expel foreign princes and troops from Brittany. It also restricted his ability to marry his children to suitors of his choosing and required that he cede territory in Saint-Malo, Fougères, Dinan, and Saint-Aubin to the king as a guarantee that in the absence of a male successor the king would determine the succession. Francis died a month later as a result of a fall from his horse during a leisurely ride. He left only a daughter, Anne of Brittany, so the treaty was used to force her, as his successor, to marry Charles VIII, and later Louis XII. Despite the French victory and the signing of the treaty, la Guerre Folle dragged on beyond Francis' death for three more years until December 1491, when Anne married Charles VIII.

Francis is interred in an elaborate tomb in the Nantes Cathedral. His tomb was commissioned by his daughter Anne, and is an important early example of Renaissance sculpture in France. (Note: Francis II's tomb was designed by Jean Perréal and sculpted by Michel Colombe.)

== Family ==
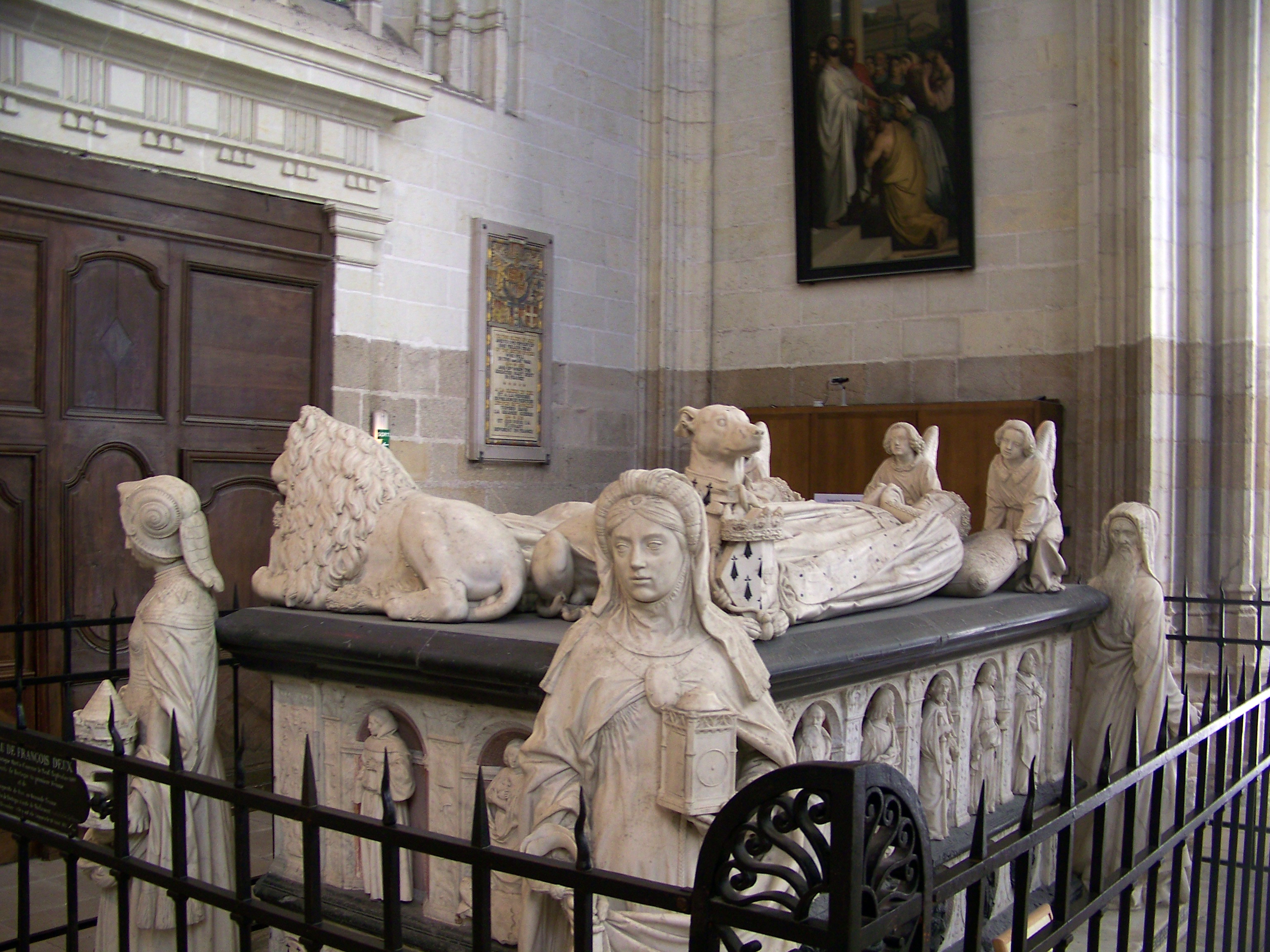
The Tomb of Francis II

Francis was married twice. His first wife was Margaret of Brittany, the eldest daughter of Francis I, Duke of Brittany (his first cousin) and Isabella of Scotland. They had one son who died shortly after his birth:

- John, Count of Montfort (29 June – 25 August 1463)

Francis' second wife was Margaret of Foix, Princess of Navarre, daughter of Gaston IV, Count of Foix and Queen Eleanor of Navarre. They had:

- Anne of Brittany (1477–1514), his only legitimate heir to reach adulthood.
- Isabeau of Brittany (1478–1490), betrothed to Jean d'Albret in 1481, died young, and was buried in the cathedral of Rennes.

Francis also had five illegitimate children with Antoinette de Maignelais, the former mistress of King Charles VII of France. These children included Francis I d'Avaugour (1462–1510).

== See also ==
- Dukes of Brittany family tree
- Henry VII of England
- War of the Roses
- Other politically important horse accidents

== Bibliography ==
- Adams, George (1896). The Growth of the French Nation. Chautauqua Century Press.
- Booton, Diane E. (2010). Manuscripts, Market and the Transition to Print in Late Medieval Brittany. Ashgate Publishing.
- Currin, John M. (2000). "The King's Army into the Partes of Bretaigne': Henry VII and the Breton Wars", War in History, Vol. 7, No. 4.
- Contamine, Philippe (2004). Bataille de Saint-Aubin-du-Cormier, in Jacques Garnier dir. Dictionnaire Perrin des guerres et batailles de l'histoire de France. Paris,France: Perrin.
- Chrimes, Stanley (1999) [1972]. Henry VII. Yale English Monarchs. New Haven, Connecticut; and London: Yale University Press. ISBN 0-300-07883-8.
- de La Borderie, Arthur Le Moyne (Membre de l'Institut) (1905–1914). Histoire de la Bretagne, 6 volumes in-quarto. Rennes, France: Imprimerie Vatar, Plihon Editeur.
- Devries, Kelly (1999). Joan of Arc: A Military Leader. The History Press.182
- Dupuy, Antoine (1880). Histoire de l'union de la Bretagne à la France, 2 vol. Paris, France: Librairie Hachette.
- Gaude-Ferragu, Murielle (2016). Queenship in Medieval France, 1300-1500. Translated by Krieger, Angela. Palgrave Macmillan.
- Hoyt, Robert (1966). Europe in the Middle Ages. Harcourt, Brace and World, Inc., 2nd ed.
- Jones, Michael (1988). Creation of Brittany. The Hambledon Press.
- Kendall, Paul Murray (1973). Richard the Third. Sphere Books. ISBN 0-351-17095-2.
- Kerhervé, Jean (1987). L'État Breton aux XIVe et XVe siècles, 2 vol. Maloine. ISBN 2-224-01703-0. Volume 2 ISBN 2-224-01704-9
- Lander, Jack (1981) [1980]. "Richard III". Government and Community: England, 1450–1509. Massachusetts, United States: Harvard University Press. ISBN 0-674-35794-9.
- Legay, Jean-Pierre; Martin, Hervé (1982). Fastes et malheurs de la Bretagne ducale 1213–1532. Rennes, France: Editions *Ouest-France Université.
- Minois, Georges (1999). Anne de Bretagne. Paris, France: Fayard.
- Ross, Charles (1997) [1974]. Edward IV. Yale English Monarchs (revised ed.). New Haven, Connecticut; and London: Yale University Press. ISBN 0-300-07372-0.
- Ross, Charles (1999) [1981]. Richard III. Yale English Monarchs. New Haven, Connecticut; and London: Yale University Press. ISBN 0-300-07979-6.
- Tourault, Philippe (1990). Anne de Bretagne. Paris, France: Perrin.
- L'État Breton, tome 2 de l' Histoire de la Bretagne et des pays celtiques. Morlaix: Éditions Skol Vreizh. 1996.
- Williams, Neville (1973). The Life and Times of Henry VII. London: Weidenfeld and Nicolson. ISBN 0-297-76517-5.

Francis II of Brittany House of Montfort Cadet branch of the House of Dreux Born: 23 June 1433 Died: 9 September 1488
Regnal titles
Preceded by Arthur III	Duke of Brittany; 1458–1488	Succeeded by Anne
Preceded by John II	Count of Étampes; 1465–1478	Succeeded by John III
