= La Guerche =

- Commune
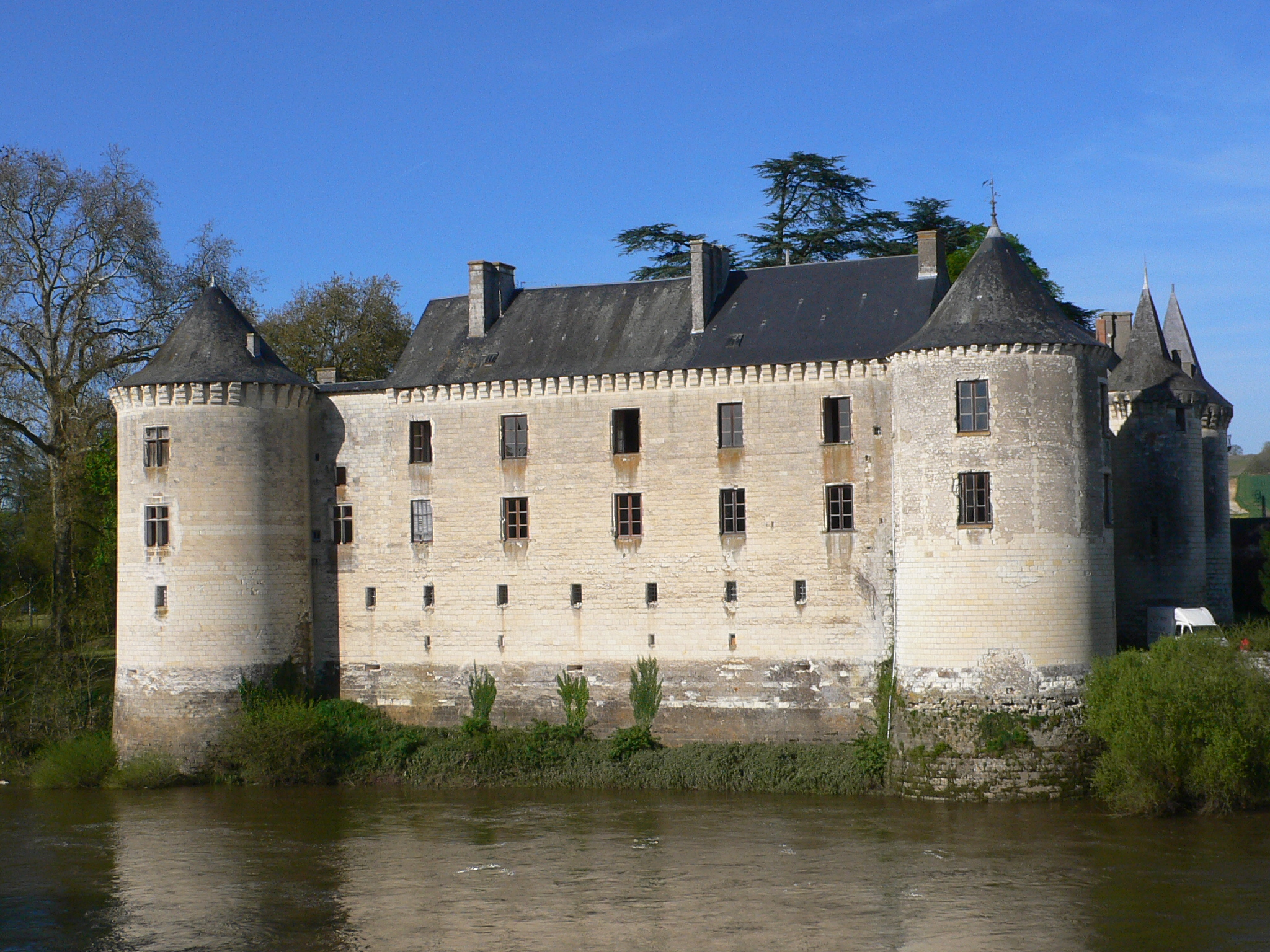
- Chateau

- Coat of arms
- Location of La Guerche
- Location within France Location within Centre-Val de Loire
- Coordinates: 46°53′09″N 0°43′54″E
- Country: France
- Region: Centre-Val de Loire
- Department: Indre-et-Loire
- Arrondissement: Loches
- Canton: Descartes
- Intercommunality: CC Loches Sud Touraine

Government
  - Mayor (2020–2026): Franck Hidalgo
- Area^{1}: 5.27 km^{2} (2.03 sq mi)
- Highest elevation: 67 m (220 ft)
- Lowest elevation: 43 m (141 ft)
- Population (2023): 174
  - Density: 33.0/km^{2} (85.5/sq mi)
- Time zone: UTC+01:00 (CET)
  - Summer (DST): UTC+02:00 (CEST)
- INSEE/Postal code: 37114 /37350
- ^{1} French Land Register data, which excludes lakes, ponds, glaciers > 1 km^{2} (0.386 sq mi or 247 acres) and river estuaries.

La Guerche (French pronunciation: [la ɡɛʁʃ]) is a commune in the Indre-et-Loire department in central France.

== Population ==
Historical population
| Year | Pop. | ±% p.a. |
|---|---|---|
| 1968 | 295 | — |
| 1975 | 258 | −1.90% |
| 1982 | 265 | +0.38% |
| 1990 | 237 | −1.39% |
| 1999 | 229 | −0.38% |
| 2007 | 213 | −0.90% |
| 2012 | 189 | −2.36% |
| 2017 | 180 | −0.97% |
| 2023 | 174 | −0.56% |
Source: INSEE

People from La Guerche are called Guerchois in French.

== Popular culture ==
Louis Amédée Achard, an author created a character called Monsieur of La Guerche, who was the titular protagonist of Les chevauchées de M. de la Guerche.

== See also ==
- Château de la Guerche
- House of Rougé
- Communes of the Indre-et-Loire department
