= Margaret of Brittany =

- Margaret depicted in prayer in des Heures d'Isabelle Stuart, c. 1455

Duchess consort of Brittany
- Tenure: 26 December 1458 – 25 September 1469
- Born: c. 1443
- Died: 25 September 1469 (aged 25–26); Château de Nantes, Nantes.
- Burial: Nantes Cathedral
- Spouse: Francis II, Duke of Brittany
- Issue: John, Count of Montfort
- House: Dreux-Montfort
- Father: Francis I, Duke of Brittany
- Mother: Isabella of Scotland

Margaret of Brittany (in Breton: Marc'harid Breizh, in French: Marguerite de Bretagne) (c. 1443 – 25 September 1469) was the elder of the two daughters of Francis I, Duke of Brittany and duchess consort of Brittany.

== Early life ==
Margaret was the elder of the two daughters of Francis I, Duke of Brittany (died 1450), by his second wife, Isabella of Scotland.

Since the Breton War of Succession, Brittany had been understood to operate according to the semi-Salic Law: women could only inherit if the male line had died out. As expected from the provision of the Treaty of Guérande, which ended the war, neither Margaret nor her younger sister Marie were recognized as heirs to the duchy. After her father's death, her uncle Peter II of Brittany succeeded as Duke of Brittany. He was also childless, and to avoid any subsequent dispute, he arranged the marriage of Margaret to his first cousin, Francis of Étampes, the second in the order of succession and the last male left of the Breton House of Montfort; also, he arranged the marriage of the younger sister Marie to John II, Viscount of Rohan, the most powerful noble in Brittany.

== Marriage ==
On 13 or 16 November 1455, Margaret was married to Francis of Étampes, at the Château de l'Hermine in Vannes. She became Duchess of Brittany upon his accession in 1458. Their only child John, Count of Montfort (29 June – 25 August 1463) died in infancy. (Note: Anne of Brittany (1476/7–1514), wife successively of Charles VIII of France and Louis XII of France, was her widower's daughter by a subsequent marriage.)

Margaret inherited The Hours of Isabella Stuart from her mother, and a depiction of Margaret kneeling before the Virgin and Child at a prayer desk, draped in fabric embroidered with the arms of Brittany, was added to the manuscript around the time of her marriage. It is now held in the collection at the FitzWilliam Museum.

== Death ==
Margaret died on 25 September 1469 at the Château de Nantes in Nantes. She was buried in the Nantes Cathedral, in the tomb constructed for her and her husband, and later his second wife, Margaret of Foix.

== Sources ==
- Booton, Diane E. (2010). Manuscripts, Market and the Transition to Print in Late Medieval Brittany. Ashgate Publishing. ISBN 9780754666233.

Margaret of Brittany House of Montfort Cadet branch of the House of Dreux Born: 1443 Died: 25 September 1469
Royal titles
Preceded by Catherine of Luxembourg-Saint-Pol	Duchess consort of Brittany; 1458–1469	Succeeded by Margaret of Foix
