= Isabella of Scotland, Duchess of Brittany =

Isabella of Scotland
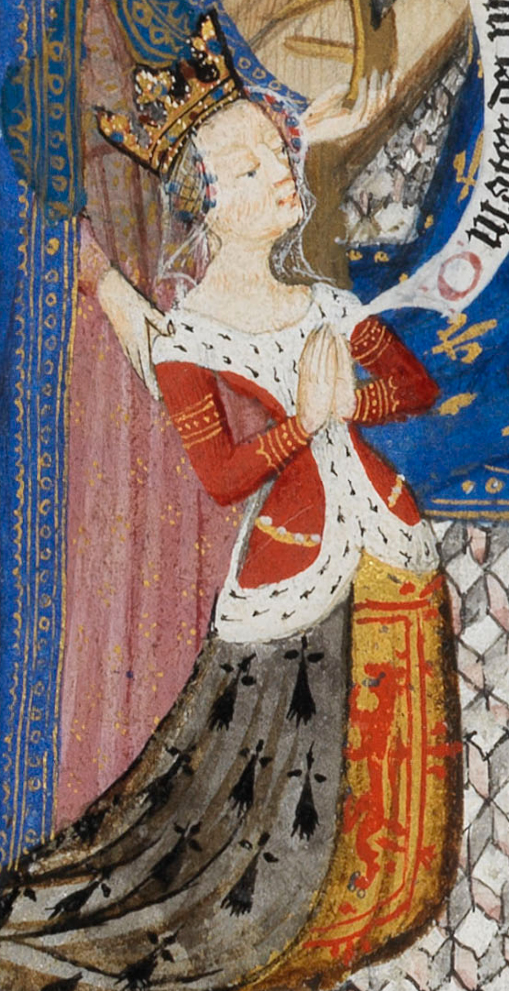

Duchess consort of Brittany
- Tenure: 30 October 1442–18 July 1450
- Born: Autumn, 1426
- Died: 13 October 1494/5 March 1499 (Aged 69-73)
- Burial: Vannes Cathedral, Brittany
- Spouse: Francis I, Duke of Brittany
- Issue: Margaret, Duchess of Brittany; Marie, Viscountess of Rohan
- House: Stewart
- Father: James I of Scotland
- Mother: Joan Beaufort

Isabella Stewart (autumn of 1426 – 13 October 1494/5 March 1499), was a Scottish princess who became Duchess of Brittany by marriage to Francis I of Brittany.

== Life ==
Born in autumn 1426, Isabella was the second daughter of James I of Scotland and Joan Beaufort. It was said she was more beautiful than her elder sister Margaret, who married the Dauphin of France, and for this John V, Duke of Brittany proposed to marry her; thus he sent ambassadors to Scotland to take a description of her. They reported "she was handsome, upright and graceful but she seemed simple too". The Duke's reply was "My friends, return to Scotland and bring her here, she is all I desire, and I will have no other; your clever women do more harm than good". The marriage contract was signed on 19 July 1441 and ratified on 29 September of that year, but the marriage did not take place as Duke John died on 29 August 1442.

Isabella's coat of arms.

Once in Brittany, Isabella married the eldest son of John V, now Francis I, Duke of Brittany at the Château d'Auray on 30 October 1442. The wedding took place in the same year as he succeeded his father as he would have needed to secure an heir for the Duchy.

After the wedding, the whole court went to Rennes for eight days of festivities. On her wedding day, her husband gave her an illuminated Book of Hours known as the Hours of Isabella Stuart.

Upon her husband's death in 1450, there were talks of Isabella's marrying Charles, Prince of Viana, heir to the disputed Kingdom of Navarre, but this proposal fell through due to the disapproval of Charles VII of France.

Her brother James II of Scotland also made vigorous efforts to persuade her to return to Scotland, where he hoped to arrange a second marriage for her. Isabella however refused and was able to resist all pressure, saying that she was happy and popular in Brittany and was in any case too frail to travel. Isabella died ca. 1494/99, which suggests that these claims of ill health were much exaggerated. Isabella also complained that her brother had never paid her dowry and demanded that this be paid to her. James was compelled to accept his sister's decision to remain in Brittany in her widowhood.

== Religion ==
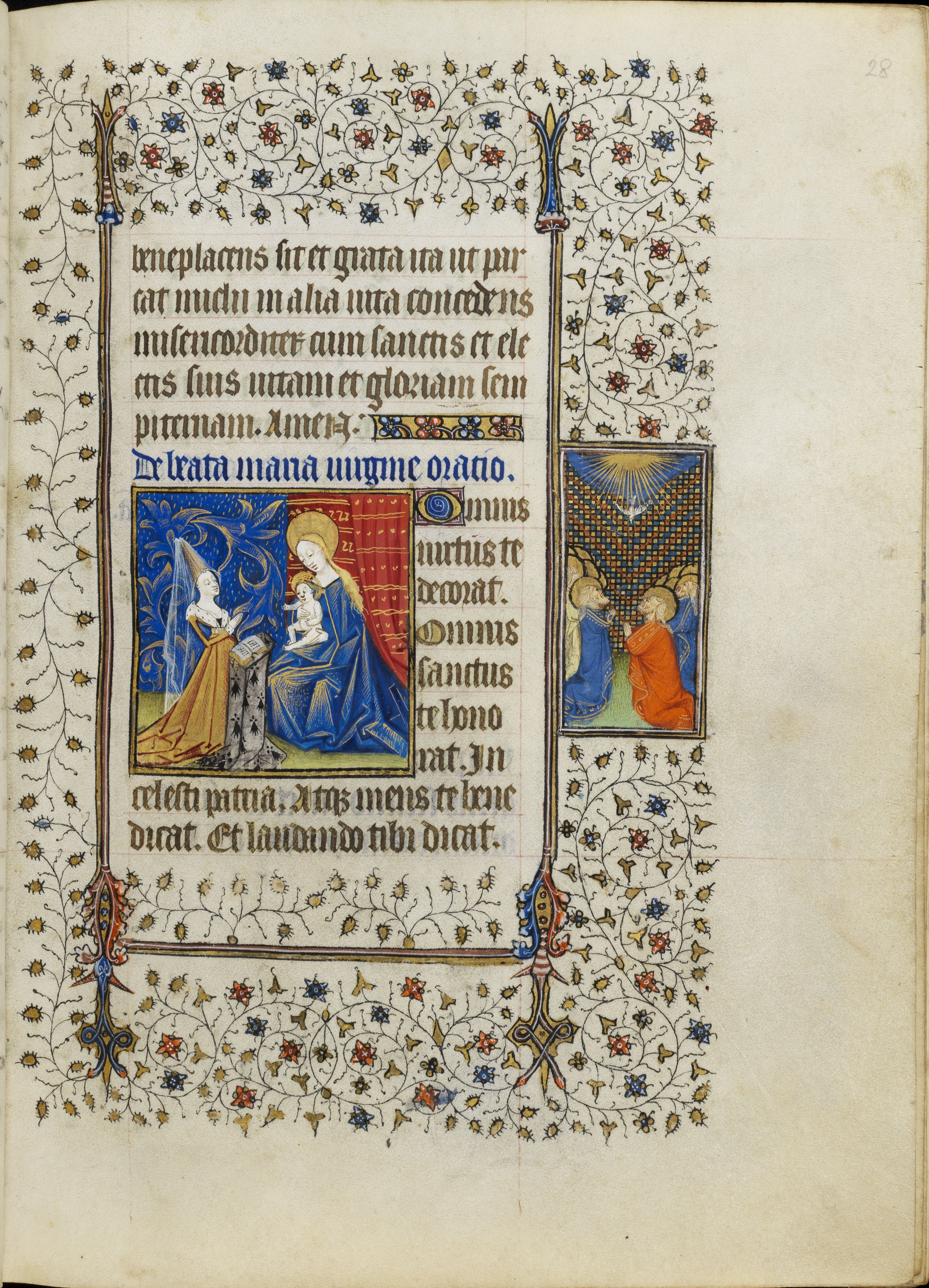
Hours of Isabella Stuart, held at the Fitzwilliam Museum, Cambridge.

Isabella was devout in her faith and there are four known books of hours associated with her.

The personal prayer book known as the Hours of Isabella Stuart is held at the Fitzwilliam Museum in Cambridge and was presented to her by her husband Francis I of Brittany after their marriage. It is one of the most extensively illustrated Books of Hours in existence. This book was previously owned by his first wife Yolande of Anjou (1412-1440) who had inherited it from her mother Yolande of Aragon (1381-1442). The book was reilluminated for Isabella in two stages to include images of the Scottish princess in heraldic dress (the ermine of Brittany and the lion of Scotland) and her own coat of arms. Isabella passed the book to her daughter Margaret of Brittany (1443-1469).

Another two books are held at the Bibliothèque Nationale de France, which she is likely to have commissioned.

== Issue ==
- Margaret of Brittany (1443–1469, Nantes), married Francis II, Duke of Brittany.
- Marie of Brittany (1444–1506), married John II, viscount of Rohan and count of Porhoët.

== Sources ==
- Dean, Lucinda H S (2024). Death and the Royal Succession in Scotland, C.1214-C.1543: Ritual, Ceremony and Power. Boydell Press. ISBN 978-1837651726.
- L'Estrange, Elizabeth (2008). Holy motherhood : gender, dynasty and visual culture in the later Middle Ages. Manchester University Press. ISBN 978-0-7190-7543-8.

French nobility
Vacant Title last held by Joan of France	Duchess consort of Brittany; 30 October 1442–18 July 1450	Succeeded by Françoise d'Amboise
