= Jacobins Convent, Nantes =

Convent in Nantes

Jacobins Convent
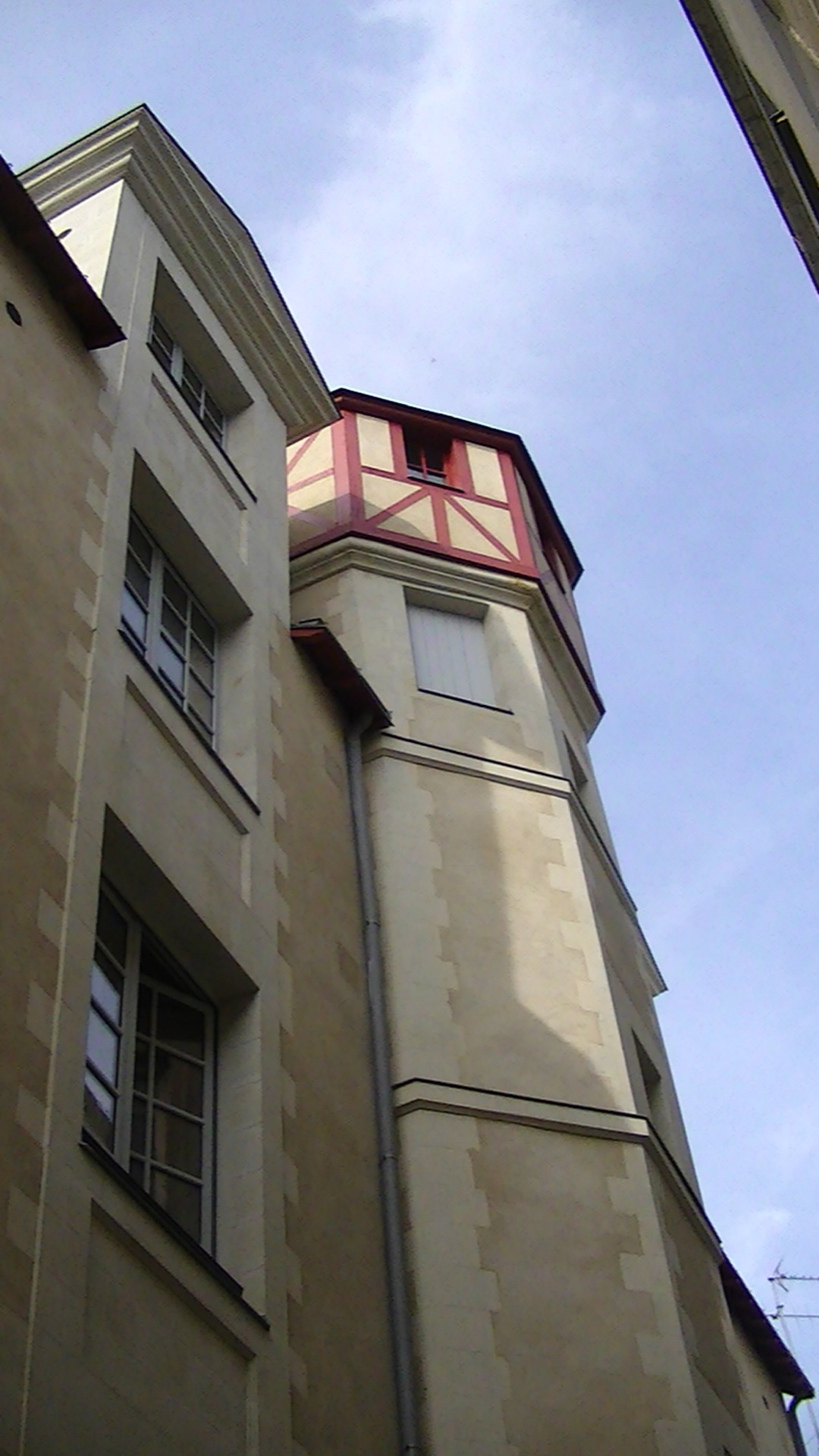
- L'hostellerie des Jacobins, last remaining building of the former convent
- Interactive map of Jacobins Convent
- Location: Nantes, France
- Coordinates: 47°12′55″N 1°33′05″W
- Type: Convent
- Beginning date: 13th century
- Completion date: 18th century

The former Jacobins Convent in Nantes, France, was constructed in the 13th century and underwent modifications until the 18th century. Only one building, known as "l'Hostellerie des Jacobins", remains from this period. It was situated in the city center, near the Château des ducs de Bretagne.

== Location ==
The convent was situated in an area bordered by the Rue des Bonnes-Sœurs (now Rue de l'Union) to the north, the castle's moats to the east (encompassing the current Rue des États and the existing moats), the 13th-century rampart to the south, and the present-day Place des Jacobins, Rue Paul-Dubois, Rue Lambert, and Impasse Joseph-Peignon (formerly "Impasse Dubois" or "Passage Dubois") to the west. To the south, the convent was bordered by the 17th-century rampart (along the current Allée du Port-Maillard). To the west, the convent was bordered by the present-day Place des Jacobins, Rue Paul-Dubois, Rue Lambert, and Impasse Joseph-Peignon (formerly known as Impasse Dubois or Passage Dubois).

The site selection for the convent was influenced by several criteria used for establishing mendicant orders' convents at the time. These included proximity to significant economic activity centers such as Bouffay and Port-Maillard, incorporation of defensive military elements like the medieval wall along the Port-Maillard quay, and the use of a section of Nantes' Gallo-Roman enclosure for construction, potentially including the dividing wall between the choir and the nave. While proximity to the Château des ducs de Bretagne was a consideration, the presence of the castle was regarded as a disadvantage due to its political and strategic implications.

== History ==
=== Foundation ===
The mendicant orders, including the Jacobins (or Dominicans), originated in the 13th century and rapidly gained prominence due to two fundamental tenets: the practice of engaging with the general public (in contrast to the traditional practice of cloistered seclusion) and the vow of poverty.

A convent for the Jacobins was established in Nantes after 1228, situated east of Place du Bouffay. The tradition attributes the foundation of the convent to André III of Vitré, who acted to fulfill a vow of Duchess Alix de Thouars (1201–1221), influenced by Saint Dominic, the founder of the Order of Preachers. Saint Dominic came to Nantes in 1217 to resolve a conflict between Pierre Mauclerc and the Bishop of Nantes. In approximately 1230, the first contingent of Dominicans was dispatched to the city, spearheaded by the Order's inaugural Master and Saint Dominic's successor, Jordan of Saxony. André de Vitré bestowed upon the religious community a private residence near the Sainte-Radegonde church (subsequently destroyed and located on the current Place Marc-Elder, in front of the castle) and land in the region of Blain. This donation was made in 1247, as attested by Dubuisson-Aubenay, who states that he has read the foundation manuscript of the establishment, which was dated 1247 and corresponds to the donation of Blain's lands. The revenue generated from this real estate, in conjunction with contributions from feudal lords, including the Duke of Brittany, enabled the Jacobins to construct new facilities for their convent. André de Vitré's donation encompassed a plot spanning the present-day Rue des États and a section of the existing moat in front of the Jacobins' tower within the castle grounds. The convent's cemetery was situated on this plot.

=== Late Middle Ages ===
In 1357, the congregation received the buildings of the "old mint" as a donation, an act confirmed in 1365 by John IV of Brittany. Additionally, he granted them the land between the Gallo-Roman and medieval enclosures, thereby enabling the monks to extend their gardens and construct new sections of the buildings.

The convent and its church were destroyed by a fire on April 10, 1410. A new church was completed in 1413, lacking the facade. The edifice was consecrated by Bishop Henri IV the Bearded in December of the same year, and subsequently by Jean de Malestroit on September 16, 1441.

In 1499, Duchess Anne of Brittany negotiated the exchange of the land on which the Notre-Dame de Pitié hospital stood, adjacent to Port Briand-Maillard, for a plot that permitted the widening of the castle's moats. This resulted in the moats reaching their current western boundary. Following this modification, the Jacobins continued to occupy the Rue des États area. During the early 16th century, they expanded their establishment to the south, extending to the wall along Port-Maillard. Additionally, they secured property rights over the alley north of the church, now known as Rue de l'Union.

=== Modern Era ===
The convent was equipped with a spacious assembly hall. Like that observed at the Cordeliers convent, the Jacobins served as a venue for gatherings of public authorities, including the city council in 1493, the presidial court, and the Estates of Brittany, particularly in 1572 and 1651.

In 1653, the establishment transferred ownership of a plot of land located northwest of the convent to the city, thereby facilitating the establishment of "Place du Port-Maillard", which was subsequently renamed Place des Jacobins. On this modest esplanade, situated to the west of the church, the facade, which was only completed in 1688, was inaugurated.

In the eighteenth century, the convent encountered financial challenges and was impacted by the floods of 1711 and 1783. From 1742 to 1748, the city leased a room in the convent to enable the presidial court to convene there, as Bouffay Castle had become too worn. Similarly, the convent served as a meeting place for guilds throughout the 18th century, including those of barbers, hatmakers, ropemakers, secondhand dealers, blacksmiths, carpenters, and toolmakers.

In 1759, the municipality enacted a policy of expropriation and destruction of buildings situated along the counterscarp adjacent to the moats. Instead of the expropriated buildings, the monks were compensated with a vacant lot along Port-Maillard, which they subsequently developed into a structure designed by architect Jean-Baptiste Ceineray in 1761. This architectural model was subsequently emulated in building buildings along the Port-Maillard quay. Additionally, the conventual buildings situated to the east were aligned with the church's apse between 1761 and 1762.

On October 1, 1764, the Estates of Brittany convened in the Jacobins' spacious assembly hall, marking the beginning of a series of festivities that continued until October 28. This event is regarded as the genesis of the Rue des États, a street that was only inaugurated in 1790 following the 1759 expropriation.

=== Dismantling ===
The convent was dismantled during the nineteenth century. During the Revolution, the monks were expelled, and the 1835 cadastral map shows the former convent crossed by a new road, "Rue Paul-Dubois", and divided into lots, which were sold to private individuals.

From June 1790 to January 1791, the recently established council of the Loire-Inférieure department convened in the Jacobins' expansive assembly hall. Pierre Coustard de Massi presided over the inaugural session on June 14, 1790. Thereafter, the council relocated to the chamber of accounts. The National Guard subsequently assumed control of the Jacobins' hall, which had been previously sought by the Port-Communeau club but ultimately yielded to the National Guard's occupation.

The church of the Jacobins, which had fallen into disuse or been repurposed since the French Revolution, was divided into two sections in 1868 during the opening of Rue de Strasbourg. The façade of the building situated on Place des Jacobins was razed in 1898, while the remaining vestiges, including the apse, were dismantled in 1904. It was during this latter demolition that the lead coffin containing the mortal remains of Françoise de Dinan was unearthed on March 1, 1904.

The Jacobins' hostelry was repurposed as a municipal warehouse, with obsolete furniture among its stored contents. The "Free Commune of Bouffay" discovered the building and, following renovations, took up residence there on October 8, 1979. The roof was found to be in a state of disrepair, resulting in water infiltration and significant damage. The building was subsequently evacuated and remained unoccupied from 2002 to 2010.

As part of an initiative designated the "Local Housing Program", Nantes Metropolis undertook a renovation of the hostelry with the objective of converting it into a residential structure designed to accommodate individuals with limited financial resources.

== Architecture ==
=== Church ===
The church, constructed in 1413, is roughly rectangular and measures approximately 57 meters in length and 14 meters in width. The side walls reach a height of 19 meters, with the highest point of the roof estimated at 25 meters, making it a relatively large building among convents in northern France. Its architectural plan is characterized by simplicity, with the building constructed using schist slabs and the roof covered with tiles.

The edifice exhibited a flat apse to the east, situated between two imposing buttresses that faced the current Rue des États, opposite the castle. This apse featured a prominent stone-ribbed bay, exhibiting Gothic architectural characteristics, which illuminated the choir. The stained glass windows, which displayed the coats of arms of the Vitré-Laval family, were destroyed during the French Revolution.

The west facade, which faces Place des Jacobins, was constructed in a style similar to that of the contemporary facades of the Chapelle de l'Oratoire (1665), which has remained unaltered since its initial construction, and Sainte-Croix Church (1685), before the erection of the bell tower.

The nave was a single-aisled space devoid of side aisles. A dividing wall separated the nave from the choir, and two columns suggest that a portico or vestibule existed at the west entrance.

The roof was supported by a wooden frame comprising trusses that followed the shape of the chevet's arch. This framework was visible from the ground, with the struts discernible. The church probably had a bell tower, although this is not evident in any 19th-century depictions or photographs. However, a scenographic plan of the city dating back to 1650 does show it.

The earliest chapels were constructed laterally, with the oldest located at the west end. The Charette Chapel, situated to the south, was erected before the 17th century, as was the Holy Sepulcher Chapel, located to the north. The latter served as a reference point for the subsequent alignment of chapels.

=== Cloister ===
The cloister was circumscribed to the north by the church and encompassed on the remaining sides by convent edifices, which included a capacious assembly hall measuring 24 meters in length and 5 meters in width. The monastery's entrance was oriented towards "Rue Brandouil" or "Ruelle des Jacobins", which is presently designated as Rue Lambert.

=== Convent buildings, gardens, cemetery ===
The concentration of buildings around the cloister is only certain after the 17th century. The Nantes convent appears to have adhered to the architectural simplicity, which is one of the order's rules. However, the decorative elements of the church, which were theoretically prohibited, suggest that there might have been deviations from the rule in other parts of the convent. The sources are scarce and late, and knowledge of the buildings is limited.

The cemetery was of considerable importance. It was situated to the east of the castle and underwent two phases of reduction: the first around 1499 and the second around 1760. This latter reduction occurred concurrently with the development of the castle's moats and counterscarp.

The gardens, a fundamental component of convents, encompassed a considerable expanse to the southeast of the cloister and retained their function at the time of the convent's acquisition.

=== Exclusion buildings ===
The first aid room and hostel were designated as "exclusion buildings." They were distinct from the cloister. However, the two structures experienced disparate fates. The infirmary was originally part of an adjacent wing until the early 18th century when it was integrated into the overall cloister square. It subsequently disappeared in the 19th century. In contrast, the "Hostellerie des Jacobins", located in today's Impasse Joseph-Peignon, was constructed as a separate structure to accommodate external guests while adhering to the convent rules. It was designed to be distinct from the other convent buildings and is the only surviving structure today.

== Notable figures buried in the establishment ==
The funeral niche of Isabelle of Brittany (1411–1443), daughter of John V of Brittany and first wife of Guy XIV of Laval, was located in the choir. The tomb of Françoise de Dinan (1406–1499) and her eldest son, Pierre de Laval (lord of Montafilant), who died in 1475, was found in one of the chapels. Additionally, the choir contained the tomb of the Sieur de Lussan, who served as governor of Nantes and its castle. He was interred on February 23, 1600. In 1627, Jean Bernard, lord of La Turmelière, commissioned the construction of a chapel with the architect Guillaume Béliard, who designed the screen of the Carmelite convent. This structure was intended to serve as a mausoleum for Bernard and his family.

== Toponyms ==
The religious establishment exerted a considerable influence on the naming of local streets and other public places. As a result of this influence, only the name of the Place des Jacobins has survived. Before the Revolution, the Rue des Jacobins (or Basse Rue des Jacobins, now Rue de l'Emery) and Haute Rue des Jacobins (north of Place des Jacobins) were designated by this name. The street was subsequently renamed Rue Jussieu and removed in 1868 during the construction of Rue de Strasbourg. The Ruelle des Jacobins was also renamed several times, first becoming Rue Lambert, then Rue Lambert, and finally Rue Paul-Dubois.

The convent also inspired the designation of one of the towers of the Château des ducs de Bretagne as the "Tour des Jacobins" (alternatively designated as the "Tour des Anglais").

== Remnants ==
At the site of this convent, only the hostelry remains, situated between Impasse Joseph-Peignon, Rue Paul-Dubois, and Rue Lambert. At the southeast corner of the junction between Rue Paul-Dubois and Place des Jacobins, a base of a pillar from the old façade still exists. In the cellars bordering the south of the former church parcel, an examination of the slate walls has revealed the possibility that they may be the walls of old chapels, particularly the one located behind the sacristy.

The Dobrée Museum has acquired two carved sandstone fragments from the old church. Measuring 5.40 m and 3 m in length, the fragments bear traces of paint and feature two coats of arms: one representing French Brittany and the other representing independent Brittany.

The mortal remains of Françoise de Dinan were conveyed to Nantes Cathedral, where a commemorative plaque was affixed.

== Iconography ==
No representations of the convent exist beyond those depicted on the aforementioned overall plans: the scenographic plan of 1650; the plan by Nicolas Portal (1739); the plan by François Cacault (1757); and the plan by François-Léonard Seheult and Julien-François Douillard (1790).

The church was first drawn during the meeting of the Estates of Brittany in 1764, then by Hawke around 1810, and photographed, particularly before its final destruction in the early 20th century.

== See also ==
- Dominican Order
- Former Carmelite Convent at Nantes

== Bibliography ==
- de Berranger, Henri (1975). Évocation du vieux Nantes (in French) (2nd ed.). Paris: Les Éditions de Minuit. ISBN 2-7073-0061-6. OCLC 312748431.
- Grégoire, Pierre (1925). Les Dominicains, dits Jacobins, de Guérande et de Nantes (in French).
- Jarnoux, Alphonse (1981). Les anciennes paroisses de Nantes : première partie; les paroisses de la cité (in French). Nantes: Alphonse Jarnoux.
- Lopez, Victor (2008). "L'hotellerie des Jacobins de Nantes n'a pas encore livré tous ses secrets". Place publique (in French) (10): 5–7.
- Collectif (1978). Iconographie de Nantes (in French). Nantes: Musée Dobrée. pp. 18–20.
- Péron, André (1988). Nantes et la Révolution : la mémoire des lieux (in French). Quimper: Éditions Ressac. pp. 42–44. ISBN 2-904966-18-8.
- Pied, Édouard (1906). Notices sur les rues de Nantes (in French). A. Dugas.
- Vincent, Vaiana (2008). "Les couvents des ordres mendiants de la ville de Nantes : l'exemple du couvent des Jacobins". Nantes religieuse, de l'Antiquité chrétienne à nos jours : actes du colloque organisé à l'université de Nantes (19–20 octobre 2006). Bulletin de la Société archéologique et historique de Nantes et de la Loire-Atlantique (in French). Département d'histoire et d'archéologie de l'université de Nantes. pp. 83–98. ISSN 1283-8454.
- Wester, Pascale (2007). "L'hostellerie des Jacobins, un couvent devenu mairie" (PDF). Nantes au quotidien, mairie de Nantes (in French) (177): 29–31. Archived from the original (PDF) on March 3, 2016.
