= Isabella of Brittany =

French noblewoman (1411 – c.1444)

Isabella of Brittany (French: Isabelle; 1411 – c. 1444) was a daughter of John V, Duke of Brittany, and his wife, Joan of Valois. Isabella was a member of the House of Dreux.

== Family ==
Isabella's maternal grandparents were Charles VI of France and Isabeau of Bavaria. Her paternal grandparents were John IV, Duke of Brittany and Joan of Navarre.

Isabella was related to three Queens of England. Two of her maternal aunts, Isabella of Valois and Catherine of Valois were queens of England and after the death of her paternal grandfather, John IV, her grandmother, Joan, became queen of England by her marriage to Henry IV of England. Isabella of Valois was married to Henry's predecessor, Richard II of England. Catherine of Valois was married to Henry IV's son, Henry V of England.

== Marriage ==
On 1 October 1430, at Redon, Isabella married Guy XIV de Laval. Guy fought in many different battles in the Hundred Years' War and fought alongside Joan of Arc. Guy had been betrothed to Isabella's younger sister, Margaret, who died before the marriage could take place, so Guy married Isabella instead.

Isabella and Guy had three sons and seven daughters:

- Yolande of Laval (born Nantes 1 October 1431), married firstly 1443 to Alain de Rohan, Count of Porhoet and secondly Guillaume d'Harcourt, Count of Tancarville.
- Françoise of Laval (born and died 1432).
- Jeanne de Laval (10 November 1433, Auray – 19 December 1498, Beaufort-en-Vallée), married to René of Anjou.
- Anne of Laval (born and died 1434).
- François of Laval (16 November 1435, Moncontour – 28 January 1501, Laval), successor of his father as Guy XV, married to Catherine of Alençon
- Jean of Laval (14 February 1437, Redon – 14 August 1476), twin with Arthuse; Lord of la Roche-Bernard.
- Arthuse of Laval (14 February 1437, Redon – 1461, Marseille), twin with Jean; she died unmarried.
- Hélène of Laval (17 June 1439, Ploërmel – 3 December 1500), married Jean de Malestroit, Baron of Derval.
- Louise of Laval (born 13 January 1441), married 15 May 1468 Jean III de Brosse, Count of Penthièvre.
- Pierre of Laval (17 July 1442, Montfort-sur-Meu – 1493), archbishop of Rheims.

Isabella died around 1444, and she is buried in Nantes. Her husband remarried after her death, to Françoise de Dinan, widow of Isabella's younger brother Gilles, Lord of Chantocé. Her husband was buried at the collegial church of Saint-Thugal at Laval.

=== House of Brittany ===
This family tree shows Isabella's paternal side of her family, her mother and brothers. It shows that after the death of her brothers, her uncle, Arthur became Duke of Brittany.

John IV, Duke of Brittany	Joanna of Navarre	Henry IV of England
Arthur III, Duke of Brittany	John V, Duke of Brittany	Joan of France
Isabelle de Bretagne	Guy XIV de Laval	Francis I, Duke of Brittany	Peter II, Duke of Brittany	Gilles of Brittany	Françoise de Dinan
3 sons 7 daughters

== Ancestry ==
Ancestors of Isabella of Brittany

16. Arthur II, Duke of Brittany
8. John of Montfort
17. Yolande of Dreux
4. John IV, Duke of Brittany
18. Louis I, Count of Nevers
9. Joanna of Flanders
19. Joan, Countess of Rethel
2. John V, Duke of Brittany
20. Philip III of Navarre
10. Charles II of Navarre
21. Joan II of Navarre
5. Joan of Navarre
22. John II of France (=#24)
11. Joan of France
23. Bonne of Bohemia (=#25)
1. Isabella of Brittany
24. John II of France (=#22)
12. Charles V of France
25. Bonne of Bohemia (=#23)
6. Charles VI of France
26. Peter I, Duke of Bourbon
13. Joanna of Bourbon
27. Isabella of Valois
3. Joan of France
28. Stephen II, Duke of Bavaria
14. Stephen III, Duke of Bavaria
29. Elisabeth of Sicily
7. Isabeau of Bavaria
30. Bernabò Visconti, Duke of Milan
15. Taddea Visconti
31. Beatrice Regina della Scala

== Sources ==
- Booton, Diane E. (2010). Manuscripts, Market and the Transition to Print in Late Medieval Brittany. Ashgate Publishing.
- Walsby, Malcolm (2007). The Counts of Laval: Culture, Patronage and Religion in Fifteenth- and Sixteenth-Century France. Ashgate Publishing.
