= Gilles of Brittany =

- Lord of Chantocé
- Born: 1420
- Died: 25 April 1450; Hardouinaye Castle
- Burial: Boquen
- Spouse: Françoise de Dinan
- House: Montfort-Brittany
- Father: John V, Duke of Brittany
- Mother: Joan of France

Gilles of Brittany (1420 – 25 April 1450) was a Breton prince and Lord of Chantocé. He was the son of John V of Brittany and Joan of France, and the younger brother of the dukes Francis I and Peter II.

== Biography ==
Gilles was born in 1420 to the incumbent duke, John V of Brittany and his wife, Joan of France, the daughter of the French king, Charles VI. He received a small appanage. Upon his accession in 1442, his brother Francis I sent him to the embassy to Henry VI of England, where he was granted a pension. In 1444, after returning to Brittany, Gilles kidnapped and married the eight-year-old Françoise de Dinan, a rich heiress. He thus obtained the barony of Châteaubriant, and many other places in Brittany including the Guildo Castle situated in Crehen in the department Côtes-d'Armor.

Gilles's growing power led him to demand a larger portion of his father's inheritance from his brother. Faced with his brother's refusal, he approached the King of England and offered his services. A letter from 5 July 1445 was intercepted by agents of the Duke, who refused to pardon his younger brother until the intervention of his uncle, the connétable de Richemont.

The arrival of English archers from Normandy at Guildo Castle caused the "French Party" led by Arthur de Montauban at the court of his brother the Duke, to arrange Gilles's arrest by Prigent de Coëtivy on 26 June 1446 by orders of the King of France. He was taken to Dinan, then Rennes where his brother refused to see him and then finally Châteaubriant. His property and that of his wife, Françoise de Dinan, which kept near the Duchess of Brittany, was confiscated.

Despite intervention by his uncle, the connétable de Richemont, the trial for treason and lèse-majesté, overseen by the Attorney General Olivier du Breil, began in Redon on 31 July 1446 in front of the Estates of Brittany. They refused to judge Gilles, who stayed in prison on the orders of his brother. In 1447, Olivier du Breil refused to hear another trial, while Henry VI of England threatened to intervene militarily to free him.

Gilles was transferred to Moncontour Castle in October 1448, under the guard of Olivier de Méel. Poorly treated, he wrote in December to Charles VII of France, who sent the Admiral Prigent de Coëtivy to the Duke of Brittany to demand his release. Coëtivy arrived in Vannes in May 1449 and obtained the release of Gilles, when the Duke received a faked letter from the King of England, written by Pierre La Rose, asking him to release Gilles. Gilles' release was subsequently suspended by the Duke, enraged by the fake letter.

Gilles was then transferred to Touffou, then to Hardouinaye Castle. His jailers Olivier de Méel, Jean Rageart, Roussel Malestouche, Jean de la Chèze and Oreille-Pelue attempted to starve him to death but he received help from a poor woman. On 25 April 1450, his jailers strangled him in his cell. Olivier de Méel and his accomplices were executed under the orders of Peter II of Brittany in Vannes on June 8, 1451.

Gilles's remains were transported to Boquen and buried in the abbey. A recumbent effigy made of oak, is preserved in the Museum of Art and History of Saint-Brieuc.

== Appendix ==
=== Bibliography ===
- Maryvonne Jouve-Quémarrec, L'ambassadeur de la paix : Gilles de Bretagne. Éditeur: Cheminements, 2003.
- Gabory Emile., Le meurtre de Gilles de Bretagne, 1450, Figures d’Histoire tragiques ou mystérieuses, Librairie académique Perrin et Compagnie, Paris, 1929, p. 110 à 118.
- Alain Bouchart, Grandes Croniques de Bretagne, chapitres 210, 211, 214, 281 et 219.
- Abbé Ch. Goudé, Histoire de Châteaubriant, Baronnie, ville et paroisse, Rennes, 1870.
