= Jean de Montauban =

Breton nobleman and Admiral of France

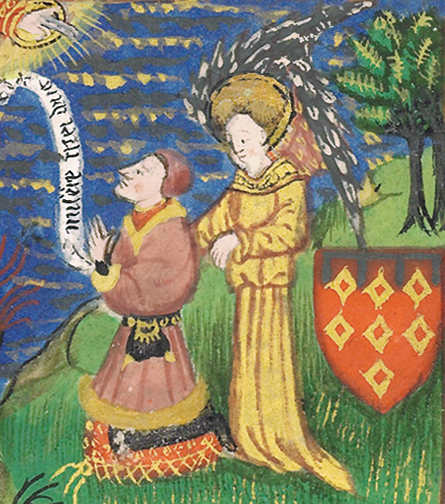
Jean de Montauban depicted in the Hours of Jean de Montauban

Jean de Montauban (1412 – May 1466, Tours) was a Breton knight from the House of Montauban, a noble family that ruled the lordship of Montauban-de-Bretagne. He served the French kings Charles VII and Louis XI. On October 8, 1461, Louis XI appointed him Admiral of France.

== Birth and family ==
Jean de Montauban was the eldest son of Guillaume de Montauban (died 1432) and his second wife, Bona Visconti, daughter of Carlo Galeazzo II Visconti, granddaughter of Bernabò Visconti, and Beatrice of Armagnac.

His younger brother, Arthur de Montauban, was Archbishop of Bordeaux and a high-ranking dignitary at the ducal court of Brittany during the reign of Duke Francis I. In 1450, following the murder of Gilles of Brittany, the duke's brother, Arthur was forced to take refuge in France.

Around 1440, Jean married Anne de Keranrais, Lady of Keranrais and Rigaudière (died 1503), with whom he had one daughter, Marie.

== Career under the reigns of Charles VII and Louis XI ==
Attached to the court of the King of France, he was appointed Marshal of Brittany in 1447 but resigned from this post in 1451 to become chamberlain to Charles VII (1422–1461), following suspicions that the Montauban family had been involved in the assassination of Gilles of Brittany.

As Marshal of Brittany, he took part in Charles VII's campaign in Normandy against Henry VI of England and fought in the decisive French victory at Formigny (1450). In 1453, he accompanied Francis of Étampes (the future Duke Francis II) during the campaign in Guyenne, taking part in the Battle of Castillon as well as the sieges of Cadillac and Bordeaux.

In 1454, he left the service of Charles VII to join the Dauphin Louis, who was then in conflict with his father. He followed Louis into exile in Brabant, where he remained in his service until the Dauphin's coronation as King Louis XI in 1461.

At the beginning of Louis XI's reign, with whom he was a close friend, Jean de Montauban was appointed Grand Master of Waters and Forests and Admiral of France in 1461, and later ambassador to the Kingdom of Castile in 1463. In 1464, he was sent to Milan to secure ratification of the peace and alliance treaty between Francesco I Sforza and Louis XI.

== Death and descendants ==
Jean de Montauban died in 1466 in Tours and was buried in the Carmelite convent founded by his father in Dol, according to his will dated April 18, 1466. His only daughter, Marie de Montauban, first married Louis de Rohan, Lord of Guémené, with whoM she had three children. In 1464 she married Georges II de La Trémoille and died in 1476 while imprisoned by her husband.

== Bibliophile ==
Jean de Montauban distinguished himself as an avid bibliophile whose patronage reflected a strong interest in spiritual edification. Among the extant manuscripts he commissioned are a Middle French compilation of seven moral and didactic treatises (by Boethius, Saint Augustine, Christine de Pizan; New York Public Library, Spencer MS 17), a translation of Synonyma by Isidore of Seville (BnF, Français 2424), and especially two richly illuminated books of hours: one belonging to Jean and his wife Anne de Kéranrais (BnF, Latin 18026), and the book of hours likely offered to his sister Isabeau, remarkable for its rare iconographic cycle depicting the apocryphal lives of Adam and Eve (Rennes Métropole, ms. 1834).
