= Joan of France, Duchess of Brittany =

Duchess consort of Brittany from 1399 to 1433

Joan of Valois
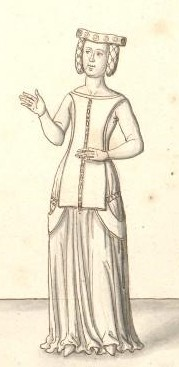

Duchess consort of Brittany
- Tenure: 1 November 1399 – 27 September 1433
- Born: 24 January 1391; Château de Melun, Seine-et-Marne, Kingdom of France
- Died: 27 September 1433 (aged 42); Vannes, Morbihan, Duchy of Brittany
- Burial: Vannes Cathedral
- Spouse: John V, Duke of Brittany (m. 1396)
- Issue: Anne; Isabelle, Countess of Laval Margaret Francis I, Duke of Brittany; Catherine; Peter II, Duke of Brittany; Gilles, Lord of Chantocé
- House: Valois
- Father: Charles VI of France
- Mother: Isabeau of Bavaria

Joan of France or Joan of Valois (French: Jeanne; 24 January 1391 – 27 September 1433) was Duchess of Brittany by marriage to John V. She was the daughter of Charles VI of France and Isabeau of Bavaria. She ruled Brittany during the imprisonment of her husband in 1420.

== Life ==
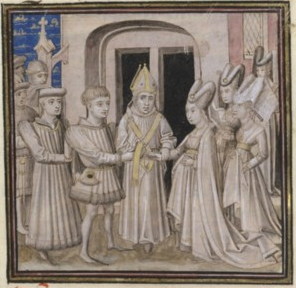
The marriage of John and Joan by Froissart.

Joan married John V, Duke of Brittany, in 1396. Three years after the wedding, her spouse became duke and she duchess of Brittany.

As duchess, Joan is perhaps most known for her role during the conflict between John V and the Counts of Penthièvre. The Penthièvre branch had lost the Breton War of Succession in the 1340s. As a result, they lost the ducal title of Brittany to the Montforts. The conclusion to the conflict took many years to confirm until 1365 when the Treaty of Guérande was signed. Despite the military loss and the diplomatic treaty, the Counts of Penthièvre had not renounced their ducal claims to Brittany and continued to pursue them. In 1420, they invited John V to a festival held at Châtonceaux. He accepted the invitation, but when he arrived, he was captured and kept prisoner.

The Counts of Penthiève then spread rumours of his death, and moved him to a new prison each day. Joan of France called upon all the barons of Brittany to respond. They besieged all the castles of the Penthièvre family one by one. Joan ended the conflict by seizing the dowager countess of Penthièvre, Margaret of Clisson, and forcing her to have the duke freed.

Joan died in 1433, during her husband's reign.

== Legacy ==
A Book of Hours by the Bedford Master, Heures Lamoignon, was dedicated to her.

== Issue ==
She had seven children:

- Anne (1409 – c. 1415)
- Isabella (1411 – c. 1442), who in 1435 married Guy XIV of Laval and had 3 children with him.
- Margaret (1412 – c. 1421)
- Francis I (1414 – c. 1450), duke of Brittany
- Catherine (1416 – c. 1421)
- Peter II (1418 – c. 1457), duke of Brittany
- Gilles (1420 – c. 1450), seigneur of Chantocé.

Joan of France, Duchess of Brittany House of Valois Cadet branch of the Capetian dynasty Born: 24 January 1391 Died: 27 September 1433
Royal titles
Preceded by Joanna of Navarre	Duchess consort of Brittany; 1399–1433	Succeeded by Isabella of Scotland
