= Françoise de Dinan =

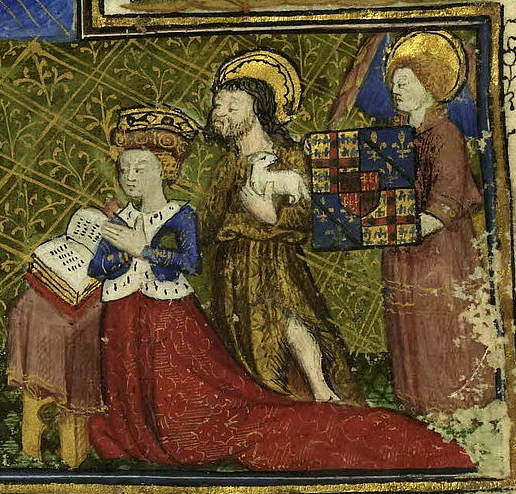
Françoise de Dinan.jpg

Françoise de Dinan (1436–1499), was a French heiress, courtier and educator. She was the governess of Anne of Brittany.

She was the daughter and heir of Jacques de Dinan (d. 1444), lord of Beaumanoir and chamberlain at the court of Brittany, and Catherine de Rohan. She was also the heir of her paternal uncle Bertrand de Dinan (d. 1444), Marshall of Bretagne, Lord of Montafilant, Chateaubriant and Huguetières.

She was abducted by and forced to marry Gilles of Brittany, brother of Francis I, Duke of Brittany and Peter II, Duke of Brittany, in 1444. She was widowed in 1450, when her spouse was imprisoned and died at the instigation of Arthur de Montauban, who wished to marry her. By the help of Françoise d'Amboise, she married Guy XIV de Laval in 1451.

In 1488, she was appointed governess to Anne of Brittany and her sister Isabelle. She played an active role in the political marriage arrangements surrounding Anne.

In 1494, she remarried the noble Jean de Proisy.
