= Hours of Jean de Montauban =

Illuminated manuscript in the library Les Champs Libres, Rennes Métropole

The Hours of Jean de Montauban
- Les Champs Libres, Rennes Métropole, MS 1834
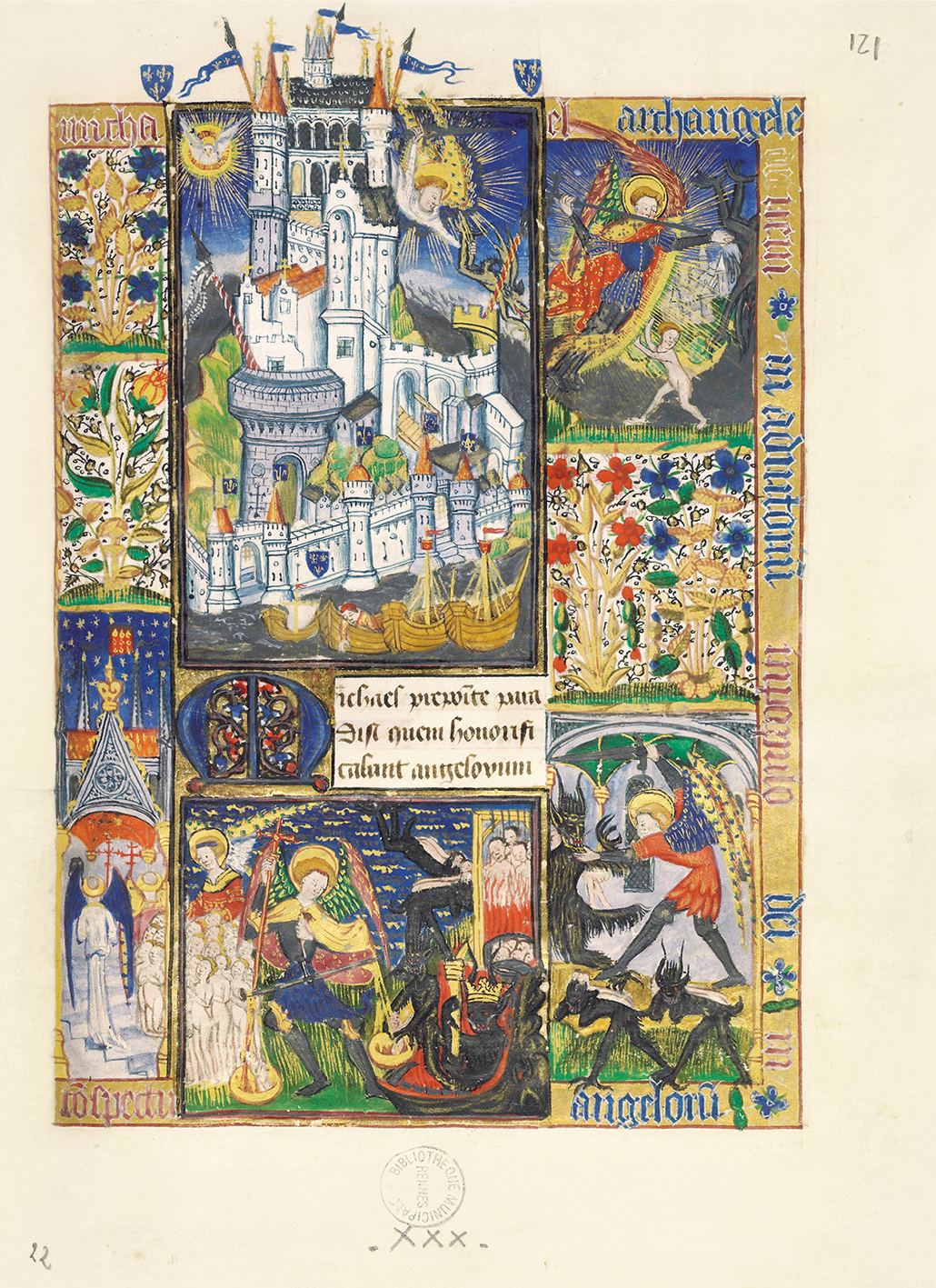
- Mont-Saint-Michel, f. 121r
- Type: Book of Hours
- Date: c. 1430–1440
- Place of origin: Brittany or France
- Illuminated by: Master of the Jean de Montauban Hours and at least one other artist
- Patron: Jean de Montauban
- Material: parchment
- Size: 223 × 160 mm; 129 folios (258 pages)
- Illumination(s): 254 illuminated pages: 37 full-page miniatures, 20 hunting scenes, 12 scenes illustrating the apocryphal lives of Adam and Eve

The Hours of Jean de Montauban is an illuminated book of hours, commissioned by Jean de Montauban, a Breton nobleman who served as Marshal of Brittany and later Admiral of France. It was likely painted in the 1430s or 1440s by at least two anonymous artists, the principal of whom is known as the Master of the Hours of Jean de Montauban. The manuscript may have been offered by Jean de Montauban as a wedding gift to his sister, Isabeau, and her husband, Tristan du Périer. It is currently kept at the library Les Champs Libres, Rennes Métropole, ms. 1834.

== Contents ==
The manuscript opens in the traditional fashion, with an illuminated calendar that includes the feasts of Breton saints. This is followed by Gospel extracts, richly illustrated Hours of the Virgin, the Hours of the Cross and of the Holy Spirit, the Penitential Psalms, litanies, the Office of the Dead, the Suffrages of the Saints (interspersed with the Offices of the Resurrection and the Ascension), and other customary prayers found in books of hours, written in both Latin and Middle French.

It is related to another book of hours commissioned by Jean de Montauban and his wife Anne de Kéranrais (now in Bibliothèque nationale de France).

Several members of the families associated with the manuscript's early ownership are directly represented within it: through portraiture (Jean de Montauban on several occasions, likely his sister Isabeau, and their father Guillaume), through heraldry (numerous folios bearing the Montauban family crest, and two with that of Tristan du Périer), and through textual references (mentions of Isabeau and Tristan in the calendar section).

== Decoration ==
Extremely richly illustrated, the manuscript features an illuminated calendar, elaborate iconography of the conventional scenes depicting the principal cycles of prayer – often divided into multiple compartments – and abundant floral decoration throughout. A long sequence of hunting scenes further enriches its imagery. Most remarkable, however, is the rare inclusion of episodes drawn from the Lives of Adam and Eve (Vita Adae et Evae), an apocryphal narrative that expands upon the biblical account of Adam and Eve, focusing on their life after the Fall: their penance, renewed trials by the Devil, and gradual redemption through angelic instruction.

A total of twelve illustrations are devoted exclusively to the story of Adam and Eve and its conclusion in Noah's Ark discovering land. These images are not connected to any textual source within the book of hours itself; they are instead inserted into the sequence of the Hours of the Virgin (specifically within Matins), which reinforces the manuscript's overarching themes of sin, repentance, and divine mercy. This inclusion is highly unusual, as no other example of an illustrated cycle of the apocryphal Lives of Adam and Eve is known to appear within a book of hours.

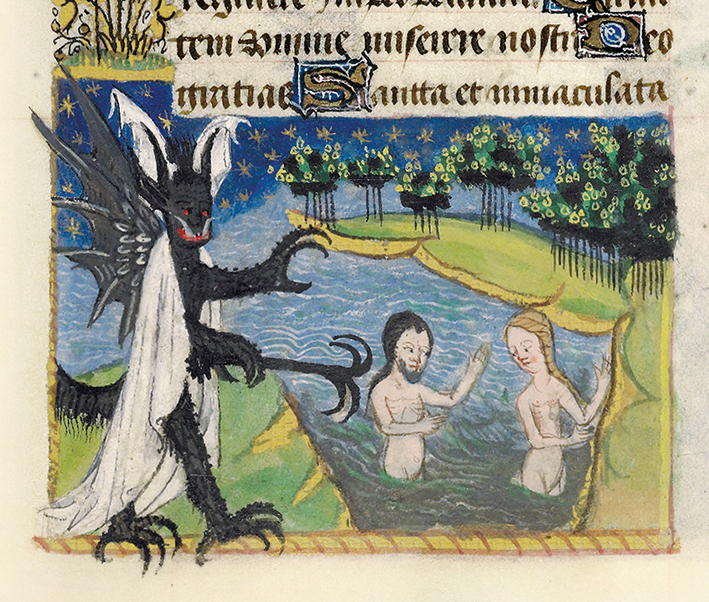
Lives of Adam and Eve: the Second Temptation

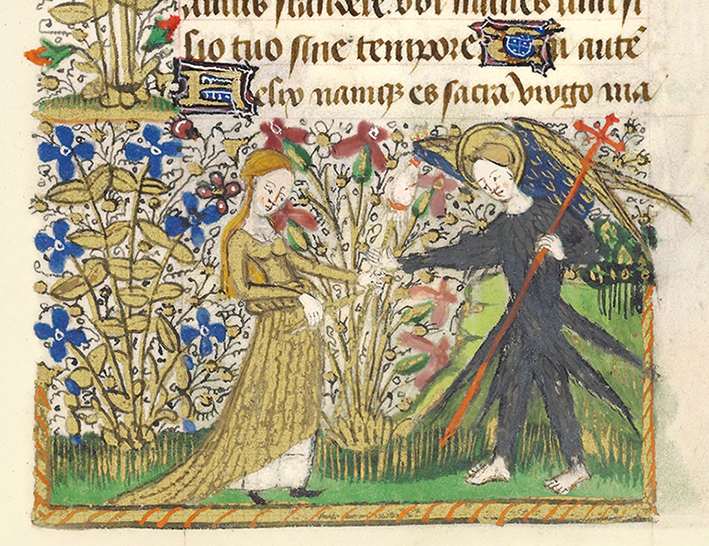
Lives of Adam and Eve: Archangel Michael instructs Eve on spinning

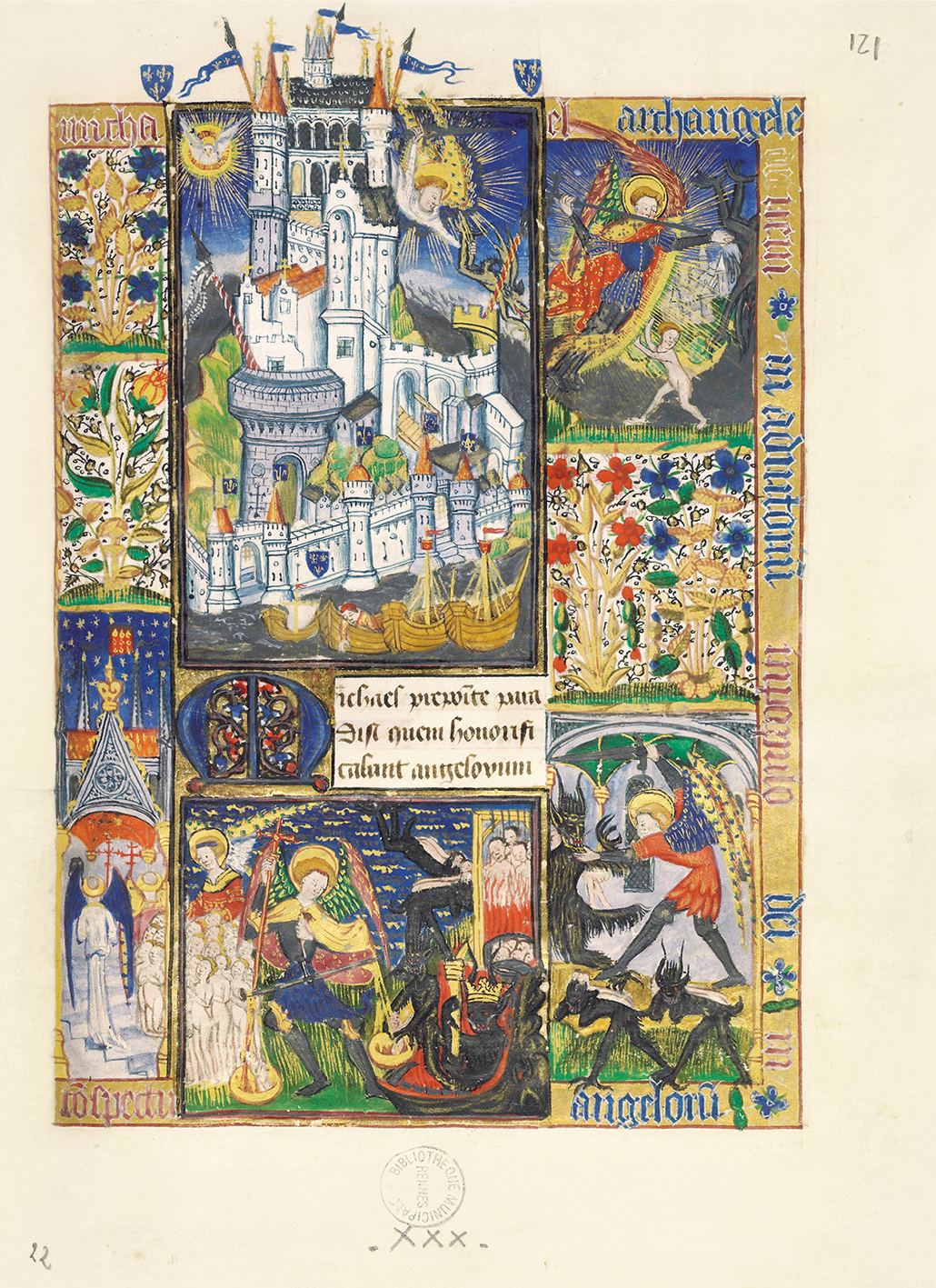
Archangel Michael and Mont-Saint-Michel

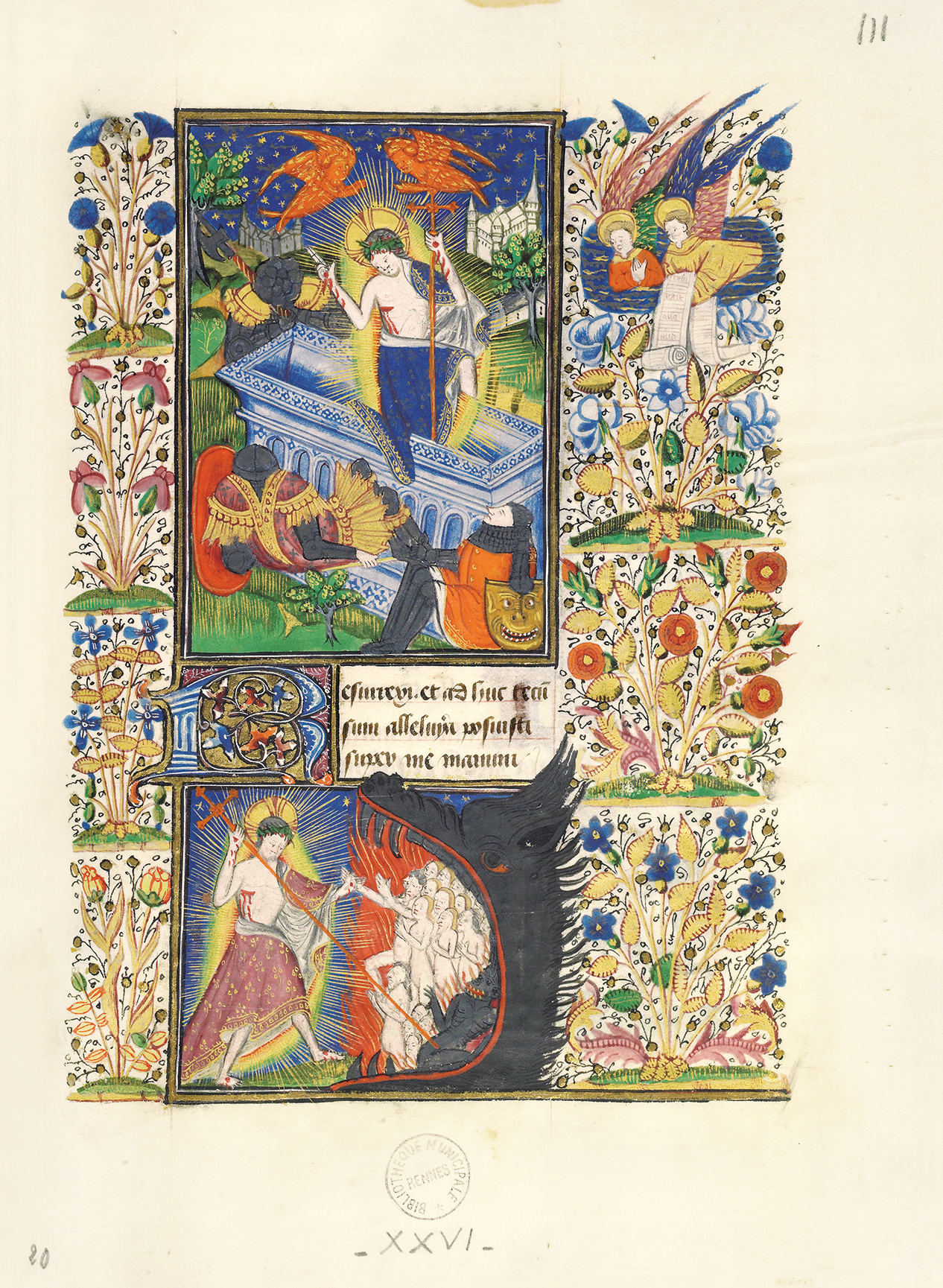
Office of the Resurrection: Resurrection of Christ and Descent to Hell

== See also ==
- Book of Hours
- Lives of Adam and Eve
