= Françoise d'Amboise =

French Carmelite nun (1427–1485)

Blessed Françoise d’Amboise OCarm
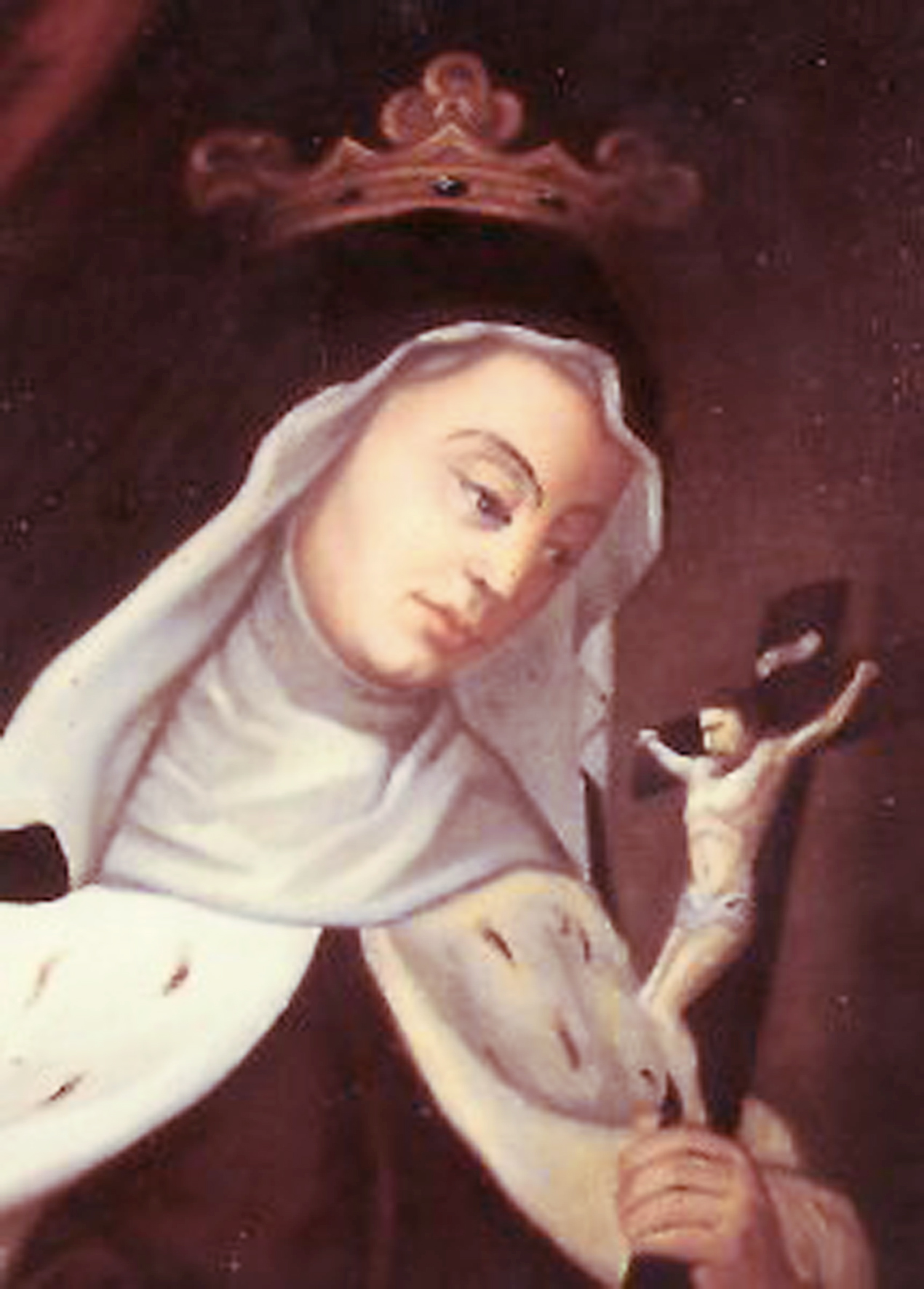
- Born: 29 May 1427; Château de Thouars, Kingdom of France
- Died: 4 November 1485 (aged 58); Nantes, Kingdom of France
- Venerated in: Roman Catholic Church
- Beatified: 16 July 1863, Saint Peter's Basilica, Papal States by Pope Pius IX
- Feast: 4 November
- Attributes: Carmelite habit, crucifix, crown

Françoise d'Amboise, O.Carm (9 May 1427 – 4 November 1485) was a French Carmelite nun.

== Biography ==
D'Amboise was born in the castle of Thouars. She was the daughter of the rich noble Louis d'Amboise, prince of Talmont and Viscount of Thouars, and Louise-Marie de Rieux. To escape from the violence of the times, she fled with her mother to the court of Brittany, which resided in Vannes and, later on, in Nantes. At the age of three she had been engaged to Peter, the second son of John V, Duke of Brittany, for political reasons. She married him at the age of fifteen, in 1442.

In 1450, after the unexpected death of Pierre's elder brother, her husband came to rule Brittany as Pierre II. Françoise d'Amboise became the Duchess of Brittany and had a discrete but active share in governing Brittany. She came to help the poor and the sick. She had also a strong feeling about justice. Her husband died of a disease in 1457. She then entered into a conflict with King Louis XI who wanted to marry her. A widow without children, she founded in 1463, together with Jean Soreth, the first convent of the Carmelites in France, of which she later became prioress.

She took the veil of a nun in 1468, when entering the convent of Vannes, called "The three Maries". She died in Nantes, at the monastery of the Carmelites.

== Veneration ==
A sainthood cause for d'Amboise was opened after her death. In 1863, she was beatified by Pope Pius IX.

== Notes ==
Françoise d'Amboise House of Amboise Born: 29 May 1427 Died: 4 November 1485
Royal titles
Preceded by Isabella of Scotland	Duchess consort of Brittany; 1450–1457	Succeeded by Catherine of Luxembourg-Saint-Pol
