= Hours of Peter II =

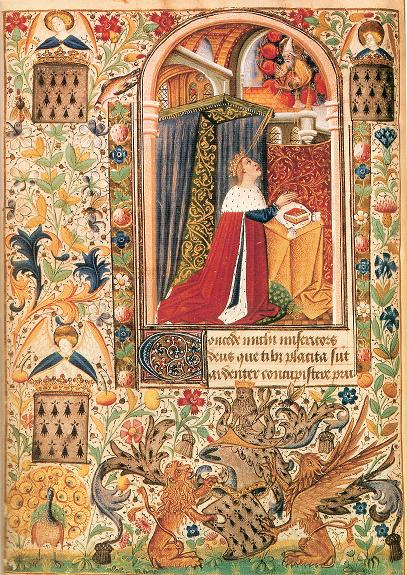
Peter II in the book

The Hours of Peter II is an illuminated book of hours completed in Paris in 1455-57 for Peter II, Duke of Brittany, following the Nantes liturgy. It contains 50 miniatures as well as vignettes in its margins. It is now in the Bibliothèque nationale, Paris.
