= Peter II of Brittany =

Duke of Brittany from 1450 to 1457

Peter II
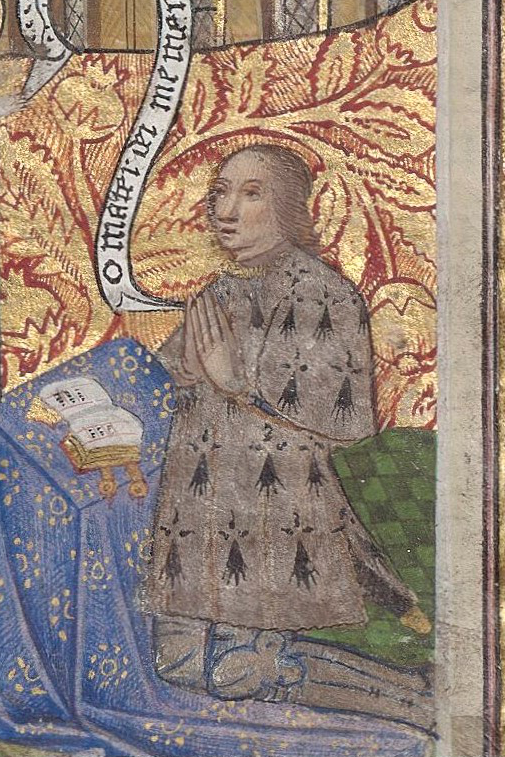
- Peter praying before the Virgin and Child, miniature from the Hours of Peter II (1455–1457)

Duke of Brittany
- Reign: 18 July 1450 – 22 September 1457
- Predecessor: Francis I
- Successor: Arthur III
- Born: 7 July 1418; Nantes, France
- Died: 22 September 1457 (aged 39); Nantes, France
- Burial: Notre-Dame de Nantes
- Spouse: Françoise d'Amboise (m. 1442)
- House: Montfort
- Father: John V, Duke of Brittany
- Mother: Joan of France

Peter II (in Breton Pêr II, in French Pierre II) (1418–1457), was Duke of Brittany, Count of Montfort and titular earl of Richmond, from 1450 to his death. He was son of Duke John VI and Joan of France, and a younger brother of Francis I.

== Biography ==
Coat of Arms of Peter II

While he was Count of Guingamp, he fought against the English in Normandy in 1449 and in 1450 with his brother, Francis I, Duke of Brittany, and his uncle the Constable de Richemont. They took several cities, including Coutances, Saint-Lô and Ferns. Upon the death of his brother in 1450, Peter became Duke. Since Francis did not have a son, according to the provisions of the first Treaty of Guerande (1365) that did not allow the succession of girls, he appointed Peter in preference to his own daughters, Margaret and Marie, to succeed him. Peter II then pursued the murderers of his other brother, Gilles.

By 1455, Peter II and his wife, Frances d'Amboise, had failed to produce offspring. Given the health problems of Peter II, this raised the question of succession. To prevent the throne of Brittany from falling into foreign hands, the Duke decided to marry his niece, Margaret, the eldest daughter of his deceased brother Francis, to his cousin, Francis, Count of Étampes. To seal the marriage, the Duke summoned the Estates of Brittany, a sovereign court, at Vannes to meet on November 13, 1455, in the upper room of la Cohue. The court, composed of the main Breton lords bishops, abbots and representatives of cities approved the marriage.

The wedding started on November 16 with a grand mass in Saint Peter's cathedral in Vannes, presided over by the Bishop of Nantes, Guillaume de Malestroit. Further celebrations subsequently took place including banquets, dances and jousts.

During dinner, the Duke led the newly espoused lady to a room in the Hermine, where she sat in the middle of the canopy ... The Duke dined in the room with the main Lords ... The Duke had the groom near him, under his canopy ... After dinner, at about four hours, the dance began with the high minstrels. The Duke led the Lady Malestroit, Monsieur de Laval led the duchess, other Lords led other Ladies, and continued to dance to the night ... The next day the games began, which lasted four days; and after the Lords had passed the time in great joy and feasts they left Vennes.

— Pierre Le Baud

The relatively short reign of the Duke did not make a mark on history. His contemporaries described Peter II as simple, well advised by his wife, but little suited to the ducal function, heavy mind as body, prone to mood swings. He participated in the Battle of Castillon in 1453.

While he was still only Count of Guingamp, he had a tomb carved from himself in the Notre-Dame de Nantes which was lost during the French Revolution. It is said that, in 1803, when the church was being destroyed, the engineer Pierre Fournier opened the tomb but found only a mannequin. It is unknown whether the Duke was actually buried in the tomb.

== Family ==
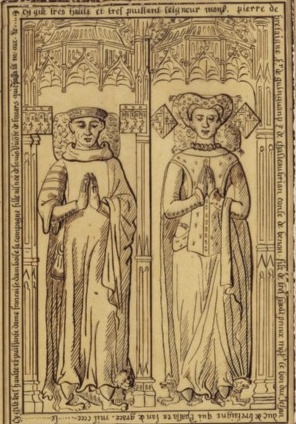
Tomb of Pierre II and Françoise d'Amboise

In June 1442 he married Françoise d'Amboise (1427–1485), daughter of Louis d'Amboise, Viscount of Thouars and Prince of Talmond, Françoise was later beatified by the Catholic Church. The marriage never produced any children.

== Succession ==
Peter II died in 1457 with no known issue. He was succeeded by his uncle Arthur.

== See also ==
- Dukes of Brittany family tree

Peter II of Brittany House of Montfort
Regnal titles
Preceded by Francis I	Duke of Brittany; Count of Montfort; 1450–1457	Succeeded by Arthur III
Peerage of England
Preceded by Francis I	— TITULAR — Earl of Richmond; 1450–1457	Succeeded by Arthur III
