= Arthur III of Brittany =

Duke of Brittany from 1457 to 1458

Arthur III
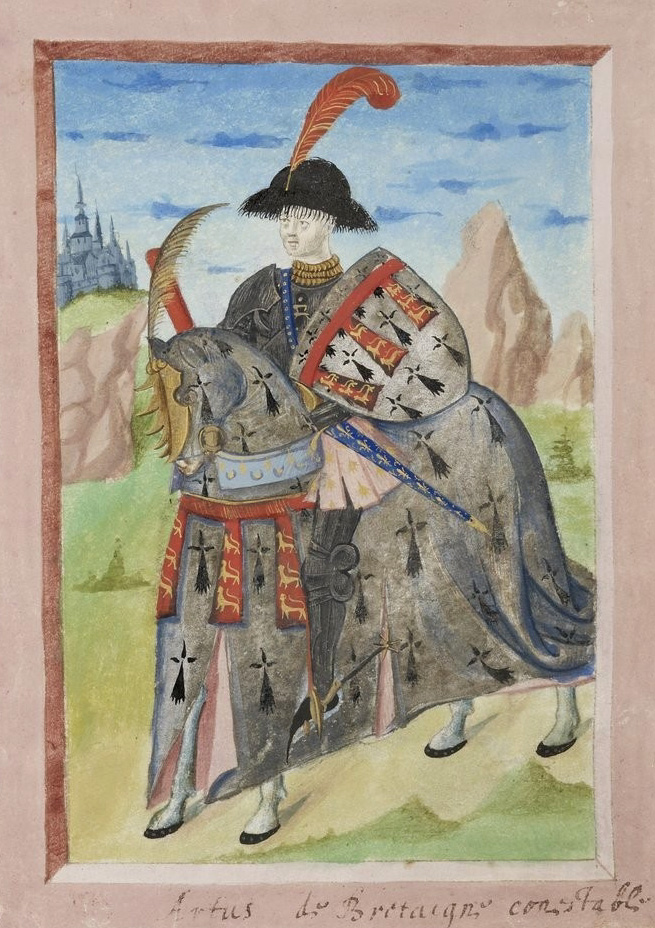

Duke of Brittany
- Reign: 22 September 1457 – 26 December 1458
- Predecessor: Peter II
- Successor: Francis II
- Born: 24 August 1393; Château de Sucinio, Brittany
- Died: 26 December 1458 (aged 65); Nantes, Brittany
- Burial: Nantes Cathedral
- Spouses: Margaret of Burgundy (m. 1423; died 1442) Joan of Albret (m. 1442; died 1444) Catherine of Luxembourg (m. 1445)
- Issue: Jacquetta (illegitimate)
- Dynasty: Montfort
- Father: John IV, Duke of Brittany
- Mother: Joan of Navarre

Arthur III (Breton: Arzhur), more commonly known as Arthur de Richemont (24 August 1393 – 26 December 1458), was briefly Duke of Brittany from 1457 until his death. He is noted primarily, however, for his role as a leading military commander during the Hundred Years' War. Although Richemont briefly sided with the English once, he otherwise remained firmly committed to the House of Valois. He fought alongside Joan of Arc, and was appointed Constable of France. His military and administrative reforms in the French state were an important factor in assuring the final defeat of the English in the Hundred Years' War.

The name Richemont reflects the fact that he inherited the English title of Earl of Richmond, which was held by previous dukes of Brittany, but his tenure was never recognized by the English crown. At the very end of his life he became Duke of Brittany and Count of Montfort after inheriting those titles upon the death of his nephew Peter II. Richemont had no legitimate issue and was succeeded in the duchy by his other nephew, Francis II.

== Life ==
Arthur was a younger son of Duke John IV and his third wife Joanna of Navarre, and so a member of the Ducal House of Montfort. Arthur was born at the Château de Suscinio. After the death of his father, his mother remarried Henry IV of England and became Queen (Dowager) of England.

Just a year before his own death, Arthur succeeded his nephew Peter II as Duke. Arthur was also titular Earl of Richmond; the earldom had often been granted to the Dukes of Brittany, but after the death of Arthur's father, the English refused to recognize his heirs as earls. Nevertheless, they continued to style themselves "Count of Richmond", while the English title was given to John Plantagenet, Duke of Bedford (1389–1435) in 1414.

Arthur was an important figure at the French court during the Hundred Years' War, even before becoming Duke of Brittany.

Arthur sided with the Armagnac faction against the Burgundians during their civil conflict in France which lasted from 1410 to 1414. He then entered the service of the Dauphin Louis, Duke of Guyenne, whose intimate friend he became and whose widow he later married. He profited by his position at court to obtain the lieutenancy of the Bastille, the governorship of the duchy of Nemours, and the confiscated territories of Jean Larchevêque, seigneur of Parthenay. He fought at the Battle of Agincourt on 25 October 1415, where he was wounded and captured. His mother Queen Dowager Joan unsuccessfully tried to have him released, only to worsen her relationship with her stepson Henry V of England. He was released by the English in 1420 and helped persuade his brother, Duke John, to sign the Treaty of Troyes. In 1422, the English created him Duke of Touraine. However, as the English refused to give him a high command he subsequently returned to the allegiance of the Dauphin in 1424, and was made Constable of France with support from Yolande of Aragon in 1425.

Coat of arms used by Arthur until 1457

Arthur now persuaded his brother, John V, Duke of Brittany, to conclude the treaty of Saumur with Charles VII of France (7 October 1425). But though he saw clearly enough the measures necessary for success, he lacked the temperament and means to carry them out. The peace concluded between John and the English in September 1427, alongside his tenacity and bad temper, led to his expulsion from the court, where Georges de la Trémoille, whom he himself had recommended to the king, remained supreme for six years, during which Arthur tried in vain to overthrow him.

As Constable of France, Arthur fought alongside Joan of Arc during her victory at the Battle of Patay on 18 June 1429. He joined his brother John in the siege of Pouancé in 1432, where he notably but reluctantly fought alongside English captains, as the Duke of Brittany was allied with the English at the time. Around this time he received an offer from the Duke of Bedford (who hoped to exploit the conflict between Richemont and la Trémoille), which included Trémoille's lands in Poitou in return for him switching sides. Poitou was not in English hands; still he found more prudent to seize those lands through less strenuous means. On 5 March 1432 Charles VII concluded with him and with Brittany the treaty of Rennes; but it was not until June of the following year that Trémoille was overthrown. Arthur now resumed the war against the English, and at the same time took vigorous measures against the plundering bands of soldiers and peasants known as routiers or écorcheurs.

By 1435 he had regained his influence at the French court and then helped arrange the Treaty of Arras between Charles VII and Philip III, Duke of Burgundy. This treaty cemented the peace between France and Burgundy, leading to the eventual defeat of the English. He was commander of the French army at the Battle of Formigny on 15 April 1450, the next-to-the-last battle of the Hundred Years' War which sealed the reconquest of Normandy. In the wake of the battle he successfully laid siege to Caen.

It was not till May 1444 that the Treaty of Tours gave him leisure to carry out the reorganization of the army which he had long projected. He now created the compagnies d'ordonnance, and endeavoured to organize the militia of the francs archers. This reform had its effect in the struggles that followed. In alliance with his nephew, the duke of Brittany, he reconquered, during September and October 1449, nearly all the Cotentin; and after the battle of Formigny he recovered for France the whole of Normandy, which for the next six or seven years it was his task to defend from English attacks. On the death of his nephew Peter II, on 22 September 1457, he became duke of Brittany, and though retaining his office of constable of France, he refused, like his predecessors, to do homage to the French king for his duchy. He reigned little more than a year, dying on 26 December 1458.

== Family ==
Arthur was married three times.

His wives were as follows:

1. married in Dijon on 10 October 1423 Margaret of Burgundy (d. 1441), daughter of John the Fearless, Duke of Burgundy and widow of Dauphin Louis, Duke of Guyenne.
2. married in Nérac c. 29 August 1442 Jeanne II d'Albret (d. 1444), daughter of Charles II, Count of Dreux and Anne of Armagnac (1402 – before March 1473). Jeanne II d'Albret was Countess of Dreux. Their marriage had no descendants.
3. married on 2 July 1445 Catherine of Luxembourg-Saint-Pol (d. 1492), daughter of Peter of Luxembourg, Count of Saint-Pol

Arthur also had a natural daughter named Jacqueline who was legitimatized in 1443.

== Succession ==
Arthur died with no known legitimate issue. He was succeeded as Duke of Brittany by his nephew Francis II, Count of Étampes.

== See also ==
- Dukes of Brittany family tree

Arthur III of Brittany House of Montfort Cadet branch of the House of Dreux Born: 24 August 1393 Died: 26 December 1458
Regnal titles
Preceded by Peter II	Duke of Brittany; 1457–1458	Succeeded by Francis II
Political offices
Preceded by The Duke of Lorraine; The Earl of Buchan	Constable of France; 1425–1450	Succeeded by The Earl of Shrewsbury
