= John V of Brittany =

Duke of Brittany from 1399 to 1442

John V
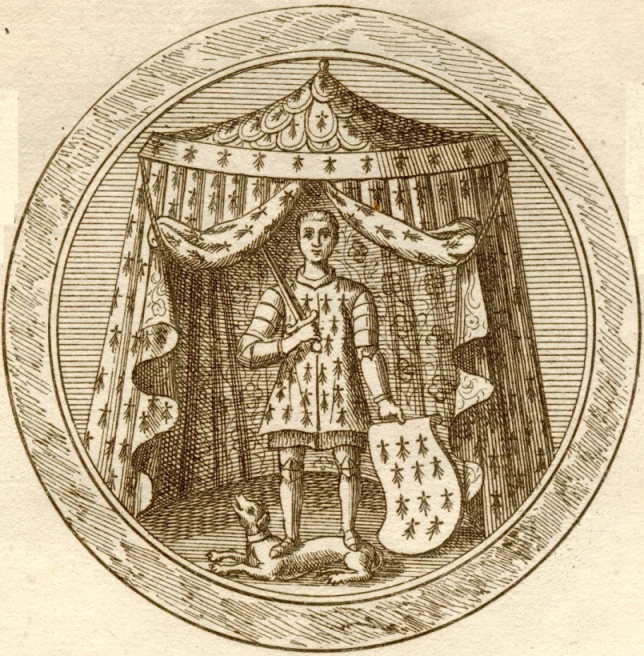
- Seal of Jean V

Duke of Brittany Count of Montfort
- Reign: 1 November 1399 – 29 August 1442
- Coronation: 28 March 1402
- Predecessor: John IV
- Successor: Francis I
- Regents: Joan of Navarre; Philip the Bold
- Born: Peter of Montfort; 24 December 1389; Château de l'Hermine, Vannes
- Died: 29 August 1442 (aged 52); Manoir de La Touche, Nantes
- Burial: Notre
- Spouse: Joan of France (m. 1396; died 1433)
- Issue more...: Isabelle, Countess of Laval; Francis I, Duke of Brittany; Peter II, Duke of Brittany; Gilles, Lord of Chantocé
- Family: Montfort
- Father: John IV, Duke of Brittany
- Mother: Joan of Navarre

John V, sometimes numbered as VI, (24 December 1389 – 29 August 1442) bynamed John the Wise (Breton: Yann ar Fur ; French: Jean le Sage), was Duke of Brittany and Count of Montfort from 1399 to his death. His rule coincided with the height of the Hundred Years' War between England and France. John's reversals in that conflict, as well as in other internal struggles in France, served to strengthen his duchy and to maintain its independence.

His alternative regnal name, John VI, as he is known traditionally in old English sources, comes from English partisan accounting as to who was the rightful duke of Brittany during the War of the Breton Succession (1341–1365), which had preceded the rule of his father. Although he faced problems which had lingered from it, his rule as duke was mostly unchallenged. Without significant internal and foreign threats, John V reinforced ducal authority, reformed the military, constructed a coherent method of taxation, and established diplomatic and trade contacts with most of Western Europe.

John V was also a patron of the arts and the Church, and funded the construction of several cathedrals. He is known for creating the "Lycée Lesage" in Vannes.

== Life ==
John V was born on 24 December 1389 at the Château de l'Hermine as the eldest son of John IV, Duke of Brittany, and Princess Joan of Navarre. He became Duke of Brittany in 1399 when he was still a minor upon the death of his father. His mother served as regent in the initial portion of his reign. (Note: Joan eventually married Henry IV of England to become Queen Consort of England.)

Unlike his father, John V inherited the duchy in peace, as the end of the Breton War of Succession and John IV's military conquests in Brittany promised. However, his father's rivals for the duchy, the Pentheiveres, continued to plot against him. Furthermore, John had to secure the peace of the duchy during an unstable period culminating in King Henry V of England's invasion of France.

=== Early career ===
He became duke at the age of ten, and began his reign under the tutelage of Duke of Burgundy, Philip the Bold, who was ravaging nearby Jersey and Guernsey. He made peace with the king of France, Charles VI, whose daughter, Joan of France, he married. He also reconciled with the powerful magnate Olivier de Clisson, formerly an enemy of his father. In 1404, he defeated a French force near Brest. A potential conflict with Clisson was averted by the latter's death.

When Henry V invaded France, John was initially allied to the French. However, he missed the Battle of Agincourt. His brother Arthur de Richemont participated, though, and was captured and imprisoned by the English. The confusion in the aftermath of the battle allowed John to seize Saint-Malo which had been annexed by the French. He then adopted a policy of switching between the two parties, English and French. He signed the Treaty of Troyes, which made Henry V heir to France, but he allowed his brother Arthur de Richemont to fight for the French.

=== Abduction by the Counts of Penthièvre ===
The counts of Penthièvre had lost the Breton War of Succession (1341–1364) in which they had claimed the ducal title of Brittany from John's grandfather, John of Montfort. The war ended in 1364 in a military victory for John's father, in which the Penthièvre claimant, Charles of Blois, died. His widow, Joan of Penthièvre, was forced to sign the Treaty of Guérande which concluded the conflict. The treaty stated that Penthièvres accepted the Montforts's right to the duchy, but if they failed to produce a male heir, the duchy would revert to the Penthièvres.

Despite the military loss and the diplomatic treaty, the counts of Penthièvre had not renounced their direct ducal claims to Brittany and continued to pursue them. In 1420, they invited John V to a festival held at Châtonceaux. John came and was arrested. Olivier of Penthièvre and his mother, Margaret of Clisson, then spread rumours of his death and moved him to a new prison each day. John's wife, Joan of France, called upon all the barons of Brittany to respond. They besieged all the castles of the Penthièvre family one by one.

Joan ended the crisis by seizing the dowager countess of Penthièvre and forcing her to free the duke. After the release, the Châtonceaux citadel was completely destroyed and the name changed to Champtoceaux. As a result of this failed imprisonment, Olivier had his county confiscated by the duke and he was forced into exile. In addition, the Montforts declared that the Treaty of Guérande had been broken and that the Penthièvre family no longer had a claim to the throne, even upon the extinction of the Montfort line. This ensured that Anne of Brittany succeeded to the duchy at the end of the century.

=== Policy in the Hundred Years' War ===
1415–1429 Controlled by Henry VI of England Controlled by Philip III of Burgundy Controlled by Charles VII of France ★ Main battles --- Battle of Agincourt, 1415 --- Journey to Chinon, 1429 --- March to Reims, 1429

After the English defeat at the Battle of Baugé, John V ditched his allies by signing a treaty with the Dauphin Charles at Sablé on May 1421. Some of its provisions were that John would abandon his commitments to the English, while Charles would dismiss his councillors who had advised him to support the Penthièvre revolt. Initial Breton military support to Charles proved significant: in the Dauphin's Loire valley campaign in the summer of 1421, the duchy provided more than a third of his army, about the same as the Scots. However, the agreement was soon undermined, as both parties failed to completely fulfill their promises. Furthermore, the release of John's brother Arthur from English captivity, along with subsequent English military successes (particularly at the Siege of Meaux), convinced John to once again reverse his allegiance, by signing the Treaty of Amiens (1423) with England and Burgundy.

The Amiens agreement also proved ephemeral. Brittany and Burgundy had secretly agreed to maintain good relations with each other if any of them abandoned the English. Arthur de Richemont soon defected to the Dauphin, and was made Constable of France. The duke of Brittany was convinced to do the same; by signing the Treaty of Saumur on 7 October 1425, John V once again allied with Charles, to which England responded with a formal declaration of war on 15 January 1426. An English incursion into Breton territory led by Sir Thomas Rempston was subsequently made. After failing to defeat the much smaller English force at the Battle of St. James, and now under threat of a full-scale assault by the English, John V once again reconciled with them by adhering to yet another agreement on 8 September 1427, on which he reaffirmed his support for the Treaty of Troyes and recognised Henry VI of England as king of France. As a gesture of allegiance to the Anglo-French dual monarchy, he sent his younger and favourite son Gilles to England to grow up in Henry's household. Gilles and Henry would become close friends over time. Richemont would remain committed to the Dauphin's cause for the rest of the war, however, though John V's defection in 1427 contributed to the former's expulsion from the French court.

John's allegiance with England had remained fickle and became ambiguous in the early 1430s, especially due to clashes between English and Breton sailors, though relations were kept afloat due to lengthy negotiations and a growing friendship between King Henry VI and the duke's younger son Gilles. Even after the Anglo-Burgundian alliance ended in 1435, he remained formally aligned to the English cause, though in effect adopting a policy of careful neutrality, attempting to become friendly with the French and willing to broker a peace between both parties. However, John took part in the Praguerie revolt in 1440 against Charles VII, and signed a neutrality agreement on 11 July 1440 with the English, by which he promised not to give shelter to England's enemies.

Relations between England and Brittany eventually collapsed due to bad diplomacy and English raids into Breton territory in 1443 and 1449. Consequent political maneuvers resulted in the murder of John V's Anglophile younger son Gilles on 24 April 1450. When a truce between the French and English was arranged at the Treaty of Tours in 1444, Brittany was not listed by the English as an ally. By then, John V had already died, and his son and successor Francis I would subsequently pay homage to Charles VII on 16 March 1446, thereby formally ending any Breton support for the English.

=== Later life ===
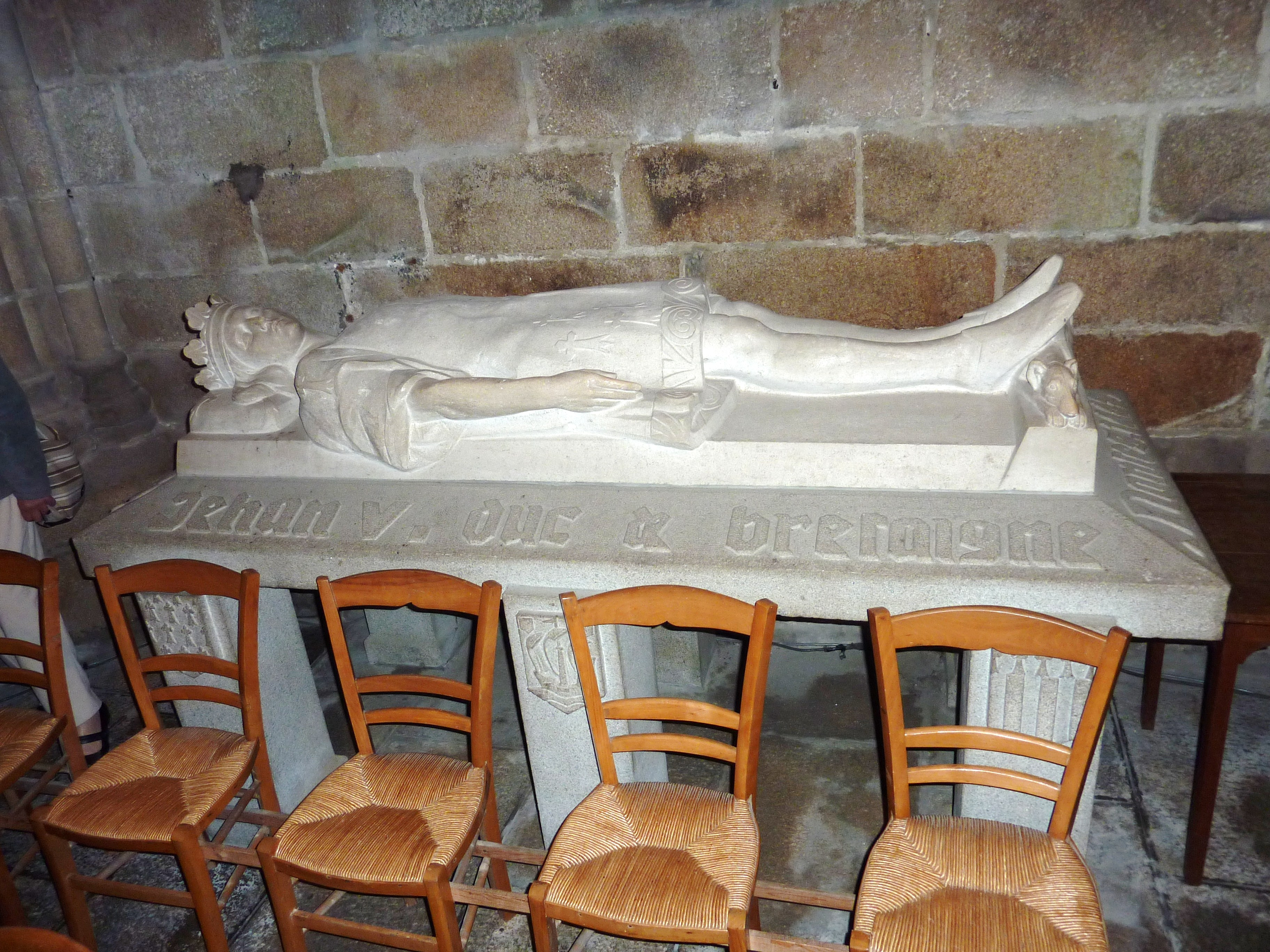
Effigy of John V in Tréguier Cathedral

While captured by the English, John II, Duke of Alençon had sold his fiefdom of Fougères to John V in order to raise the ransom for his release. After Alençon's release, his attempts to recover his territories led to conflict. John surrounded Alençon's fortress during the Siege of Pouancé (1432). Arthur de Richemont, his brother, who accompanied him, induced him to make peace.

Working with Bishop Jean de Malestroit, he began the construction of a new cathedral in Nantes, placing the first stone in April 1434.

John V also worked with the Charles I, the Duke of Bourbon to rebel against King Charles VII during the Praguerie revolt in 1440.

He died on 29 August 1442, at the Manoir de la Touche, owned by the Bishop of Nantes.

A statue of the Duke of polychrome wood is in the chapel of Saint-Fiacre in Faouët. His tomb in Tréguier cathedral was destroyed. It was replaced by a new one in the 20th century.

== Family ==
John V married Joan of France, daughter of King Charles VI "the Mad" and his wife Isabeau of Bavaria. By her he had seven children:

- Anne (1409 – aft. 1415)
- Isabelle (1411–1442, Auray), married at Redon in 1430 Guy XIV, Count of Laval (d. 1486)
- Margaret (1412–1421)
- Francis I, Duke of Brittany (11 May 1414 – 17 July 1450)
- Catherine (1416 – aft. 1421)
- Peter II, Duke of Brittany (7 July 1418 – 22 September 1457)
- Gilles of Brittany (1420 – 24 April 1450), Lord of Chantocé

== Succession ==
John V died in 1442 and was succeeded by his eldest son, Francis, as Duke of Brittany.

== See also ==
- Duchy of Brittany
- Kings and dukes of Brittany family tree

== Sources ==
- Barker, Juliet (2012). Conquest: The English Kingdom of France 1417–1450 (PDF). Harvard University Press. ISBN 978-0-674-06560-4. Archived (PDF) from the original on 12 June 2018.
- Booton, Diane E. (2010). Manuscripts, Market and the Transition to Print in Late Medieval Brittany. Ashgate Publishing.
- Grummitt, David (18 May 2015). Henry VI. Routledge. ISBN 978-0-415-63993-4.
- Knecht, Robert (2004). The Valois: Kings of France 1328–1589. Hambledon Continuum.
- Russon, Jean-Baptiste; Duret, D. (1933). La cathédrale de Nantes (in French). Savenay: Roumegoux.
- Sumption, Jonathan (2017). The Hundred Years War 4: Cursed Kings. University of Pennsylvania Press. ISBN 978-0-8122-2388-0.
- Wagner, John A. (2006). Encyclopedia of the Hundred Years War (PDF). Westport: Greenwood Press. ISBN 978-0-313-32736-0. Archived from the original (PDF) on 16 July 2018.

John V of Brittany House of Montfort
Regnal titles
| Preceded by John IV | Duke of Brittany; Count of Montfort; 1399–1442 | Succeeded by Francis I |
Peerage of England
| Preceded by John IV as recognised earl | — TITULAR — Earl of Richmond; 1399–1442 | Succeeded by Francis I |
