= Arthur de Montauban =

French magistrate and prelate (died 1479)

Arthur de Montauban (died March 9, 1479), French magistrate and prelate, belonged to one of the great families of Brittany.

To satisfy a private grudge against Gilles, brother of Francis I, Duke of Brittany, he intrigued to such good purpose that Gilles was arrested for treason, and finally executed in prison in 1450. When Montauban's duplicity was discovered he was deprived of his office of bailli of Cotentin and banished.

He then became a monk, and through the support of his brother, Jean de Montauban (1412–1466), Louis XI's favourite, obtained the archbishopric of Bordeaux in 1468. He died in Paris on 9 March 1479.
