= Treaty of Guérande (1365) =

1365 treaty ending the Breton War of Succession

The first Treaty of Guérande, signed on 12 April 1365, ended the Breton War of Succession.

In this war, two heirs of John III, Duke of Brittany, disputed each other's claim to be Duke of Brittany. Joanna de Penthievre and her husband Charles de Blois were supported by the King Charles V of France in the contest against John of Montfort, his son John IV and their English allies. Montfort died during the war after a period of imprisonment. Charles de Blois died in the Battle of Auray in 1364, which decided the war.

While John IV and his English allies won a military victory, this treaty was viewed as a diplomatic victory for the French.

John V won the undisputed right to rule as Duke of Brittany. Joanna de Penthievre transferred her claim to the Duchy of Brittany to Duke John IV, and in return kept most of her remaining lands along with a pension.

== Subsequent events ==
In 1381, after the death of King Charles V, there was a second Treaty of Guérande. It was signed between John V and King Charles VI of France. This treaty confirmed Brittany's neutrality in continuing military conflicts between France and England, it granted Joanna de Penthièvre a pension, and it established that if the House of Montfort failed to produce a male heir to the Dukedom, the senior-most male heir of Joanna de Penthièvre would become Duke of Brittany. It had been the insistence by the House of Montfort on male inheritance to the Ducal crown that was at the center of their dispute with Joanna of Penthièvre. This provision settled the rights of inheritance to the Ducal crown of Brittany. However, before any member of the House of Penthièvre could benefit from it, the ducal crown was merged into the crown of France. The provision was likely moot because of the events of 1420.

In 1420, descendants of Joanna of Penthièvre attempted to regain the Duchy by imprisoning John V. The imprisonment failed and upon his release, the Duke forced the surrender of Penthièvre to the Ducal crown, thereby ending one aspect of the Treaty of 1365 meant to favor Joanna and her descendants.

== See also ==
- List of treaties

== Sources ==
- Graham-Goering, Erika (2020). Princely Power in Late Medieval France: Jeanne de Penthièvre and the War for Brittany. Cambridge University Press. ISBN 9781108805544.
