= Estates of Brittany =

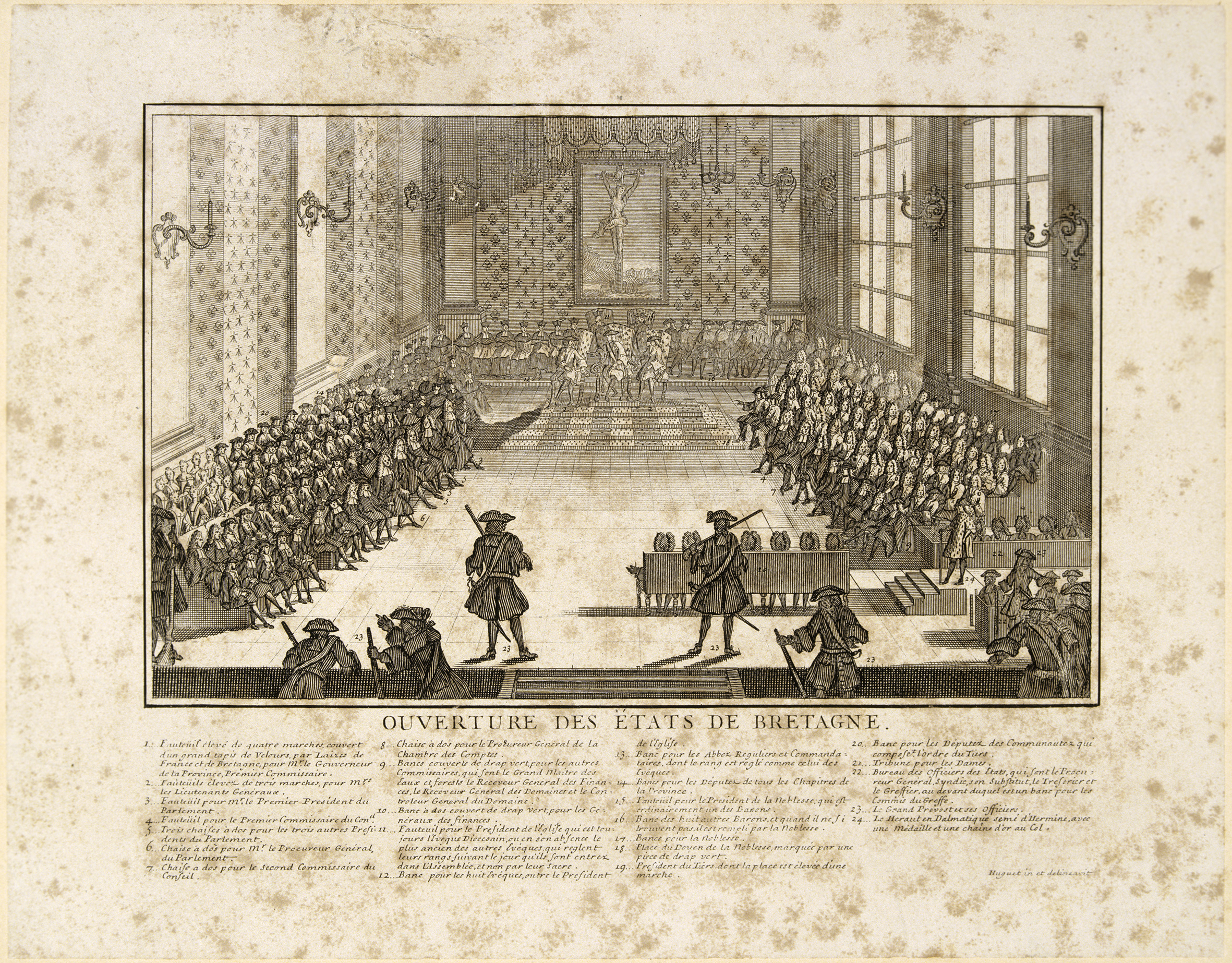
The opening of the Estates of Brittany in 1756 by Christopher Paul de Robien.

The Estates of Brittany was the States Provincial for the province of Brittany. It gathered members of the high clergy, a large number of nobles and delegates from the 42 towns and cities of Brittany. In 1788, it included nearly 1,000 nobles as opposed to fewer than 100 representatives of the other two orders.

== History ==
The Estates were founded in the Middle Ages by Arthur II, Duke of Brittany. It continued as the States Provincial of France during the time of the Ancien Régime.

In addition to founding the Estates, Duke Arthur II introduced the innovation of permitting the third estate to be represented.

The marquise de Sévigné participated in its meetings at Rennes and Vitré between 1670 and 1690, writing:

I did not want to see the opening, it was too early. The Estates do not have to be long. It only needed to ask what the King wanted. He need not say a word; and, voilà, it is done. For the Governor, he found there, I don't know how, over 40,000 écus which returned to him. An infinity of other presents, pensions, road and town repairs, 15 or 20 grandes tables, continual gaming, eternal balls, comedies three times a week, a grand 'braverie' : that's the Estates. I forget 400 pipes of wine that were drunk, but if I forget that little thing, the others did not forget it, and this was the first.

Meetings were the opportunity for an intense nightlife, with banquets (paid for on the provincial budget) offering the chance to continue disputes begun at the daily sittings by competition in consumption, drinking and card games.

In more serious matters, the Estates' interests were essentially the same as the parliament of Brittany. They sometimes met concurrently and addressed similar issues. The two bodies naturally cooperated in restricting royal power in the province and limiting the action of royal representatives there, mainly the intendant and commander in chief. The Estates particularly came into conflict with the royal state over taxes, since Brittany had been exempted from the national salt tax and also enjoyed other privileges. Conflicts arose in the late 17th century, leading to the uprising known as the Revolt of the papier timbré and later in the early 18th century when the Estates resisted the centralising measures of the king, leading to the Pontcallec Conspiracy, which was severely repressed by the monarchy.

== See also ==
- History of Brittany
